= The Best: Make the Music Go Bang! =

Greatest hits album by X
- Released: July 27, 2004
- Recorded: 1978–1992
- Genre: Punk rock
- Length: 157:48
- Language: English
- Label: Elektra/Rhino
- Producers: Tony Berg, Alvan Clark, John Doe, Ray Manzarek, Patrick McDonald, Jimmy Nanos, Tim Summerhayes, Michael Wagener, X, Billy Zoom

X chronology
Beyond and Back: The X Anthology (1997)	The Best: Make the Music Go Bang! (2004)	X – Live in Los Angeles (2005)

Professional ratings
Review scores
Source	Rating
AllMusic	link
Blender	link

The Best: Make the Music Go Bang! is a compilation album by American rock band X, released July 27, 2004, by Elektra Records/Rhino Entertainment. The album included liner notes by Tony Alva, K. K. Barrett, Tito Larriva, Ray Manzarek, Paul Reubens and Henry Rollins, among others.

== Track listing ==
All songs were written by Exene Cervenka and John Doe, except where noted.

Disc 1

No.	Title	Writer(s)	Original album	Length
1.	"Adult Books" (Single Version)		"Adult Books" single, 1978	3:14
2.	"We're Desperate" (Single Version)		B-side to "Adult Books"	2:03
3.	"Los Angeles"		Los Angeles	2:24
4.	"Your Phone's off the Hook, but You're Not"		Los Angeles	2:25
5.	"Johny Hit and Run Paulene"		Los Angeles	2:50
6.	"Soul Kitchen"	the Doors	Los Angeles	2:26
7.	"The World's a Mess; It's in My Kiss"		Los Angeles	4:28
8.	"The Unheard Music"		Los Angeles	4:45
9.	"White Girl" (Single Mix)		"White Girl" single, 1980	3:29
10.	"The Once Over Twice"		Wild Gift	2:31
11.	"Universal Corner"		Wild Gift	4:33
12.	"Some Other Time"		Wild Gift	2:17
13.	"In This House That I Call Home"		Wild Gift	3:33
14.	"In This House That I Call Home" (Live in August, 1980 at the Santa Monica Civic Auditorium)		Urgh! A Music War	2:41
15.	"Riding with Mary" (Single Version)		"Riding with Mary" single, 1983	3:12
16.	"The Hungry Wolf"		Under the Big Black Sun	3:47
17.	"Motel Room in My Bed"		Under the Big Black Sun	2:41
18.	"Blue Spark"		Under the Big Black Sun	2:08
19.	"The Have Nots"		Under the Big Black Sun	4:46
20.	"Under the Big Black Sun"		Under the Big Black Sun	3:24
21.	"The New World"		More Fun in the New World	3:25
22.	"Breathless"	Otis Blackwell	More Fun in the New World	2:19
23.	"We're Having Much More Fun"		More Fun in the New World	3:08
24.	"True Love"		More Fun in the New World	2:15
25.	"I Must Not Think Bad Thoughts"		More Fun in the New World	4:15
Total length:				78:59

Disc 2

No.	Title	Writer(s)	Original album	Length
26.	"Wild Thing" (7" Single Edit)	Chip Taylor	Wild Thing single	3:33
27.	"Poor Girl"		More Fun in the New World	2:53
28.	"The Call of the Wreckin' Ball" (performed by the Knitters)	Dave Alvin and John Doe	Poor Little Critter on the Road	2:57
29.	"Someone Like You"		Poor Little Critter on the Road	2:42
30.	"What's Wrong with Me..."		Ain't Love Grand!	3:45
31.	"Burning House of Love"		Ain't Love Grand	3:55
32.	"My Goodness"		Ain't Love Grand	4:37
33.	"4th of July"	Dave Alvin	See How We Are	4:06
34.	"You"		See How We Are	3:30
35.	"When It Rains..."		See How We Are	4:33
36.	"Surprise Surprise"		See How We Are	2:52
37.	"I'm Lost"		See How We Are	2:57
38.	"See How We Are"		See How We Are	3:49
39.	"Skin Deep Town" (Live in December, 1987 at the Whisky a Go Go)		Live at the Whisky a Go-Go	3:19
40.	"Around My Heart"			4:26
41.	"Just Another Perfect Day"		Live at the Whisky a Go-Go	4:34
42.	"Devil Doll"		Live at the Whisky a Go-Go	4:39
43.	"Big Blue House"		Hey Zeus!	4:05
44.	"Clean Like Tomorrow"	Exene Cervenka	Hey Zeus!	3:58
45.	"Country at War"	John Doe	Hey Zeus!	4:15
46.	"New Life"	John Doe	Hey Zeus!	3:24
Total length:				78:49 157:48
