= X: The Unheard Music =

1986 film

- Theatrical release poster
- Directed by: W.T. Morgan
- Produced by: Christopher Blakely
- Cinematography: John Mansour
- Music by: John Doe, Exene Cervenka, Billy Zoom, and D.J. Bonebrake
- Production company: Angel City Productions
- Release date: 1986
- Running time: 84 minutes
- Country: United States
- Language: English

X: The Unheard Music is a 1986 rockumentary film directed by W.T. Morgan about the Los Angeles punk band X. The film stars John Doe, Exene Cervenka, Billy Zoom, and D.J. Bonebrake. It was filmed by Angel City Productions between 1980 and 1985 in around Los Angeles. Post-production was completed almost five years to the month after shooting began.

== Background ==
Producer Christopher Blakely was inspired by the underground music scene of the late 1970's, and wanted to document the energy and creativity of bands that were yet unheard on the radio. At the suggestion of Co-Producer Everett Greaton, Chris contacted the band X. He obtained exclusive rights to make a movie about the band, to use their music in the film, and to call it "The Unheard Music". Chris, along with two classmates from Stanford University--Everett Greaton and W.T. Morgan-- founded Angel City Productions, and began production of the film. The film was screened as a work in progress at the Los Angeles Filmex festival in 1984. It had its debut at the Cinerama Dome in Holywood. Original theatrical distribution was by Skouras Pictures. The film was released on DVD and Blu-ray through MVD on December 7, 2011. Special features include footage of John Doe and Exene Cervenka in discussion as well as an interview with Angel City Productions. A live outtake and a trailer for the feature are also included on the disc.

== Songs in order of performance ==
- Los Angeles
- Year One
- We're Desperate
- Because I Do
- Beyond & Back
- Come Back to Me
- Soul Kitchen
- White Girl
- The Once Over Twice
- Motel Room in My Bed
- The Unheard Music
- Real Child of Hell
- Johny Hit and Run Pauline
- I Must Not Think Bad Thoughts
- The World's a Mess; It's in My Kiss
- The Have Nots
