= Alphabetland =

Studio album by X
- Released: April 22, 2020
- Recorded: 2018, 2020
- Studios: Sunset Sound Recorders, Hollywood and Mant Sounds, Glassel Park in Los Angeles
- Genre: Punk rock
- Length: 27:00
- Label: Fat Possum
- Producer: Rob Schnapf

X chronology
Merry Xmas from X (2009)	Alphabetland (2020)	Smoke & Fiction (2024)

Alphabetland is the eighth studio album by American punk rock band X. Released digitally in April 2020, it is their first studio release in 27 years and the first with their original line-up in the past 35 years. X released the album with no prior announcement to coincide with the 40th anniversary of their debut album Los Angeles and credited songwriting to all four members for the first time in their career. The release has received positive reviews from critics.

== Recording and release ==
We gave each other space... Maybe I was a little less judgmental, and the first recording session proved that we could sound like us.

— John Doe on recording Alphabetland

The songs on Alphabetland were written in the 18 months leading up to release, except for "Delta 88 Nightmare" which dates back to the late 1970s (a demo track of it was previously released on the 1997 anthology Beyond and Back: The X Anthology and the 2001 reissue of Los Angeles), and "Cyrano De Berger's Back", which bassist John Doe wrote in the late seventies, and which was originally released by The Flesh Eaters on their 1981 album A Minute to Pray, a Second to Die. Additionally, "I Gotta Fever" is a re-write of the 1981 song "Heater". "Cyrano" was also recorded by X on the first post-Billy Zoom album, See How We Are but the band members were always unhappy with the recording and preferred this version with Zoom's saxophone. The original line-up of X had been a touring act for several years but only decided to re-enter the studio with new music after the crowdfunded album Live in South America proved economically viable and they got back the rights to their original albums from Warner Bros. Records.

Commenting on the long break between new material, Doe explained that with a sufficient body of work, X had enough fun touring and there was little motivation for new music. The Alphabetland was recorded across several sessions in 2019 and 2020 with producer Rob Schnapf, who has previously worked with Elliott Smith, Beck, and Joyce Manor. He was someone whom Zoom knew and liked as a collaborator and former neighbor. The initial recording sessions were in January 2019 with no plans to release any material and the band followed this with a single and tour that encouraged them to return in early 2020. Even though the beginning of the songwriting date from April 2019, when the only songwriters were vocalist Exene Cervenka and Doe, all tracks are credited to all four members of X and the recording sessions coincided with the individual musicians improving their relationships with one another as the other members added to the arrangements. Doe estimates that he and Cervenka are responsible for 70% of the composition but wanted to recognize the contributions of the other musicians and for unity, they agreed to split songwriting. The band had previously released a single recorded during these sessions—"Delta 88 Nightmare"/"Cyrano DeBerger's Back"—and a music video for the A-side but did not announce any intentions on further releases. In January 2019, the band revealed that they had entered the studio to record for the first time since 1985, but at the time did not say whether or not the recordings would be released as an album. The band finished recording by February, got together for photos and final mixing on March 12, and shipped off the album for mastering, which wrapped on April 10.

Alphabetland sounds like we should sound but we never did. It's similar to the first four albums but it's a much better recording, better produced... The new album is really good. I like it. You should listen to it.

— Billy Zoom on recording the production on Alphabetland

X approached artist Wayne White about working on the album's art due to vocalist Exene Cervenka and bassist John Doe both being fans of his. He created the original artwork Curdled American Dream for the cover to represent the decay of the United States, with X representing a voice of America. The album was revealed with no prior announcement on April 22, 2020, with the approval of Fat Possum Records. X had planned on an August or September release, but the shutdown of record and CD manufacturing plants during the COVID-19 pandemic moved the band to an April release to coincide with the 40th anniversary of the release of Los Angeles. Singer Exene Cervenka was insistent on releasing the album early, particularly if the musicians could not tour for the rest of 2020.

The album was initially released on vinyl via Fat Possum and via the digital platform Bandcamp, with a more comprehensive rollout to other formats to follow later in the year. The band initially had plans to tour in August and September in support of the release; these were postponed due to the pandemic but during the lockdown, the band still intended to tour to support this album. On April 29, a music video for "Water & Wine" was released, followed by one for the title track on July 8. Doe performed some live shows streamed on the Internet in May 2020.

== Reception ==
=== Critical reception ===
Professional ratings
Aggregate scores
Source	Rating
Metacritic	82/100
Review scores
Source	Rating
AllMusic	4/5 stars
American Songwriter	4.5/5 stars
And It Don't Stop	A−
The Arts Desk	4/5 stars
Exclaim!	7/10
The Philadelphia Inquirer	3/4 stars
Pitchfork	7.6/10
Rolling Stone	4/5 stars
The Spill Magazine	5/5 stars
Tom Hull – on the Web	B+

According to the review aggregator Metacritic, Alphabetland received "universal acclaim" based on a weighted average score of 82 out of 100 from 10 critic scores. Album of the Year sums up critical consensus as an 81 out of 100 with 10 reviews. The album was well-received with reviewers noting the fact that all band members received writing credit for the songs. All past releases were credited to lead singer Exene Cervenka and bassist/singer John Doe, leaving drummer D.J. Bonebrake and guitarist Billy Zoom out of song royalties.

Writing for Variety, Chris Morris called the title track a quintessential X song with "metaphorical perfection" that meets the expectations of X fans who had hoped the band would release new material since they re-formed. He summed up, "One carries away the hope that when the current crisis is over, we will all gather to sing it together in some club on the Strip, maybe the Whisky, as X returns to the stage". American Songwriter's Hal Horowitz gave the album 4.5 out of five stars, calling the release strategy a "refreshingly punk move", with each band member having superlative contributions to the recording, and sums up that it is "not just an impressive, even unprecedented comeback, but one that resonates with the vitality and dizzying power of X's finest music". The "Noteworthy" column in the Santa Monica Daily Press had two critics recommend the album, as well as the band's live performances. Michael Mitchell of The Spill Magazine gave the release five out of five stars, summing up, "I cannot think of a brighter spot on 2020's crap sandwich of a year than the surprise release of this album. I cannot find a flaw. Literally". The editorial staff of AllMusic gave the release four out of five stars, with reviewer Mark Deming finding all of the songs high quality and summing up Alphabetland as "a nearly miraculous example of a band returning to the studio after a long layoff and delivering at full strength".

Reviewing in his "Consumer Guide" column, Robert Christgau called it a "mature classic" featuring "one rueful to agonized lookback at their own mortality after another". He highlighted the opening verse of "Water & Wine" as among the album's "many excellent lyrics" and concluding that "the verbiage wouldn't mean as much if John and Exene weren't caterwauling as wild and gifted as ever—and if Zoom and Bonebrake weren't so committed and undiminished". Chris O'Connell of Pitchfork gave the release a 7.6, calling this a "formidable comeback", with attention given to the lyrics, production, and sense of fun. Guy Oddy of The Arts Desk gave the release four out of five stars, calling it "no lame, end of career cash-in" and hoping for more music. In Exclaim!, Erin MacLeod assessed Alphabetland at seven out of 10, writing that "the pleasant melodies, harmonizing between Cervenka and Doe, bouncy beat and loud guitar are a welcome combination" and describing it as a record "that fills up a room and begs to be turned up loud", but finds the closing track to be disappointing. Dan DeLuca of The Philadelphia Inquirer specifically noted Bonebrake and Zoom's contributions to the music, calling their work "a rip-roaring spirit" that makes for a "vital" album. Ken Tucker of Fresh Air calls the album "the sound of X snatching back its past in order to fuel the music of its future" that "doesn't have a trace of nostalgia or a slackening of intensity". Korey Grow of Rolling Stone claimed that the album has lived up to the hype of X's reputation, calling it "a rare animal among comeback records—it both feels like a continuance of the band's classic Eighties sound and it's actually good". In Newsweek, David Chu called the release a spectacular return to form and Collin Estes of the Colorado Springs Indy emphasized the band's punk rock roots and clever songwriting coming through on this album. In Inlander, Dan Nailen praised the album as "a scintillating reminder of everything that made them standard-bearers of West Coast punk rock", criticizing only the closing track; he reiterated this praise when the CD and vinyl editions were released. Writing for Shepherd Express, Paul McComas wrote an extensive positive review that also serves as an overview of the entire band's career and the strengths of each individual member.

=== Sales ===
Doe reported that the album sold 5,000 copies on vinyl LP on the first day. Fat Possum allowed the band to keep all profits from sales in the first 10 days. Upon the physical release, the album debuted at seventh place on the UK Record Store Chart, which was X's first showing on any Official Charts Company listing.

Sales chart performance for Alphabetland
Chart	Peak	Date	Duration
Current Album Sales	45	May 2, 2020	3 weeks
UK Record Store Chart	7	August 28, 2020	1 week

=== Accolades ===
Accolades for Alphabetland
Issuer	Listing	Rank
Rough Trade	Albums of the Year 2020	77

== Track listing ==
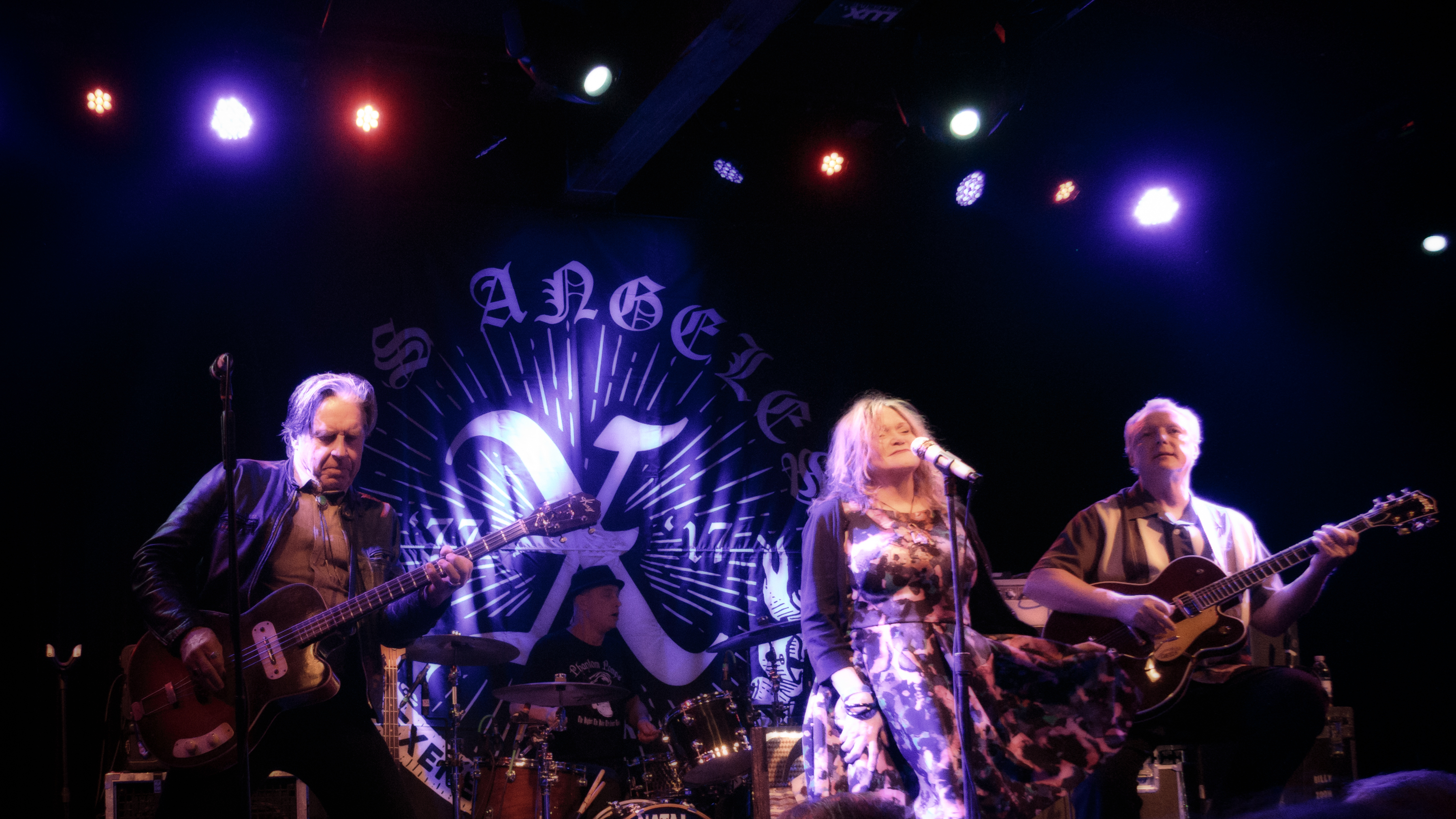
X had been a live touring act for several years prior to Alphabetland but had not released an album since 1993, and the original line-up had not released one since 1985. They are pictured here in 2016.

All songs written by DJ Bonebrake, Exene Cervenka, John Doe, and Billy Zoom, except as indicated

No.	Title	Writer(s)	Length
1.	"Alphabetland"		2:58
2.	"Free"		2:14
3.	"Water & Wine"		2:39
4.	"Strange Life"		2:34
5.	"I Gotta Fever"	Doe	2:27
6.	"Delta 88 Nightmare"	Cervenka and Doe	1:37
7.	"Star Chambered"		2:17
8.	"Angel on the Road"		2:49
9.	"Cyrano DeBerger's Back"	Doe	3:04
10.	"Goodbye Year, Goodbye"		2:16
11.	"All the Time in the World"		2:05
Total length:			27:00

== Personnel ==
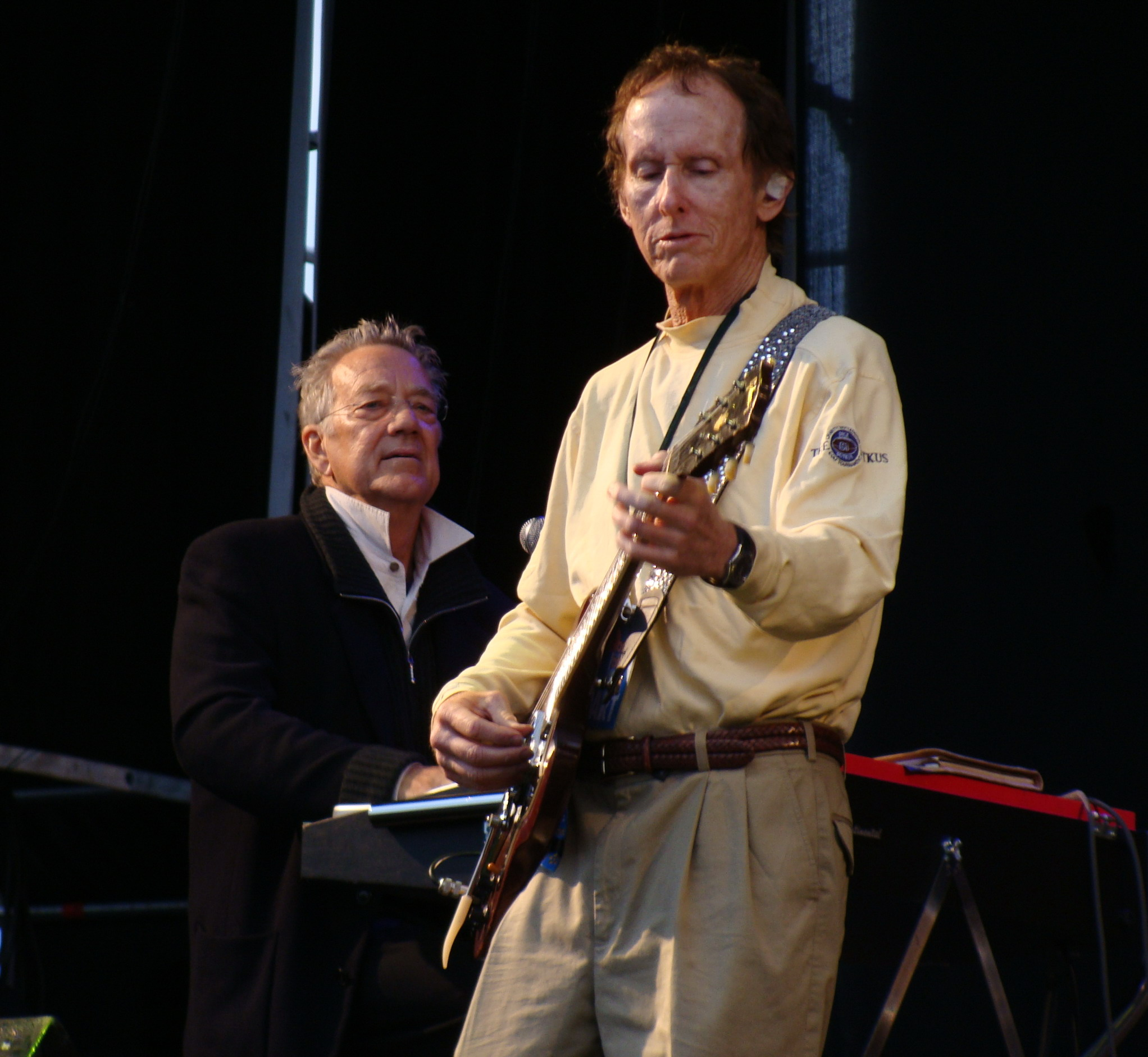
Guitarist Robby Krieger (foreground) appears on this album; he previously played in The Doors with Ray Manzarek (background), who produced X's first four albums

X

- DJ Bonebrake – drums, percussion
- Exene Cervenka – vocals
- John Doe – bass guitar, vocals
- Billy Zoom – guitar, saxophone on "Cyrano De Berger's Back", piano

Additional personnel

- Robby Krieger – guitar on "All the Time in the World"
- Scotty Roller – layout
- Rob Schnapf – guitar, production, engineering
- Matt Schuessler – engineering
- Wayne White – cover

== Release history ==
Release formats for Alphabetland
Format	Date	Label	Notes
Digital	April 22, 2020	Fat Possum Records	Bandcamp exclusive
Compact Disc	April 22, 2020	Fat Possum Records	—
Vinyl LP	April 22, 2020	Fat Possum Records	—
Blue Vinyl LP	August 29, 2020	Fat Possum Records	Exclusive to independent record shops
White Vinyl LP	August 29, 2020	Fat Possum Records	Exclusive to Rough Trade, limited to 400 copies

== See also ==
- List of 2020 albums
