= Ain't Love Grand! =

Ain't Love Grand

Studio album by X
- Released: July 1985
- Recorded: 1985
- Studio: Amigo Studios, North Hollywood, California
- Genre: Rock
- Length: 42:11
- Label: Elektra
- Producer: Michael Wagener

X chronology
More Fun in the New World (1983)	Ain't Love Grand (1985)	See How We Are (1987)

Singles from Ain't Love Grand!
- 1. "Burning House of Love" Released: 1985

Professional ratings
Review scores
Source	Rating
AllMusic	3.5/5 stars
Robert Christgau	B
Rolling Stone	favorable

Ain't Love Grand is the fifth studio album by American rock band X, released in July 1985 by Elektra Records. The album was their first not produced by Ray Manzarek. It was reissued with four bonus tracks by Rhino Records in 2002. The album included the minor radio hit "Burning House of Love", which the band performed on American Bandstand in September 1985, their largest television exposure to date. The album also includes a cover of the Small Faces song "All or Nothing". Lead guitarist Billy Zoom left the band after this album but he later returned to the group in 1998 during a tour and the original line-up released their next full-length studio album in 2020 with Alphabetland.

== Details ==
At the time of release, Zoom said, "I think it's the best songs we've ever done, and the best-produced record, and the best-engineered, and the best-sounding record we've made. It's the first one I'm really happy with. The others were always kind of hit-and-miss." Doe said, "Sonically, it's designed to fit into radio airplay. We're waving a typical... somewhat typical sounding carrot under radio listeners' noses. Then they've got the opportunity to see that there’s more going on."

== Reception ==
Bart Bull at Spin said the band's record company, "found a new producer for them, Michael Wagener, who's given them a bigger sound, a crunchier sound, a real 'rock' sound. He's given them a laughably homogenized sound that succeeds — X now sounds like everything else on AOR radio. Christgau said, "they appease their major mentors and keep Billy in the band by taking X to the same producer as Christian heavy metal boys Stryper. Michael Wagener can't make John and Exene sound commercial enough to convert anyone."

== Track listing ==
All tracks are written by John Doe and Exene Cervenka, except where noted.

Side one
No.	Title	Length
1.	"Burning House of Love"	3:54
2.	"Love Shack"	3:06
3.	"My Soul Cries Your Name"	3:37
4.	"My Goodness"	4:40
5.	"Around My Heart"	4:43

Side two
No.	Title	Writer(s)	Length
1.	"What's Wrong with Me..."		3:43
2.	"All or Nothing"	Steve Marriott; Ronnie Lane	3:08
3.	"Watch the Sun Go Down"		3:50
4.	"I'll Stand Up for You"		4:00
5.	"Little Honey"	Dave Alvin; John Doe	3:43
6.	"Supercharged"		3:47
Total length:			42:11

2002 reissue bonus tracks
No.	Title	Writer(s)	Length
11.	"Wild Thing" (Long Version)	Chip Taylor	6:19
12.	"I Will Dare" (Demo)	Paul Westerberg	3:18
13.	"My Goodness" (Demo)		5:08
14.	"All or Nothing"	Marriott; Lane	4:52
Total length:			58:40

- "All or Nothing" is listed as a bonus track on the 2002 reissue

== Personnel ==
X

- Exene Cervenka – vocals
- Billy Zoom – guitar, saxophone
- D.J. Bonebrake – drums, percussion
- John Doe – vocals, bass guitar

== Charts ==
Sales chart performance for Ain't Love Grand!
Chart	Position	Date	Duration
The Billboard 200	89	September 13, 1985	14 weeks

Sales chart performance for singles from Ain't Love Grand!
Song	Chart	Peak	Date
"Burning House of Love"	Billboard Mainstream Rock Tracks	27	September 13, 1985
