= Beyond and Back: The X Anthology =

Album

Compilation album by X
- Released: October 28, 1997
- Recorded: 1977–1995
- Genre: Punk rock
- Length: 130:10
- Label: Elektra

X chronology
Unclogged (1995)	Beyond and Back: The X Anthology (1997)	The Best: Make the Music Go Bang! (2004)

Professional ratings
Review scores
Source	Rating
AllMusic	4/5 stars
Robert Christgau	2/5 stars

Beyond and Back: The X Anthology is a two-disc compilation album by American rock band X, released October 28, 1997 by Elektra Records.

== Background ==
The anthology's tracks are split between already-released songs and demos, single versions, outtakes and live recordings of the band and their alter-ego, The Knitters.

== Track listing ==
All tracks are written by John Doe and Exene Cervenka, unless otherwise indicated

Disc 1
No.	Title	Writer(s)	Length
1.	"Los Angeles"		2:23
2.	"The World's a Mess; It's in My Kiss"		3:53
3.	"Yr Ignition"	Doe	2:55
4.	"Year One (Demo)"		1:17
5.	"The Hungry Wolf"		3:47
6.	"We're Desperate"		2:00
7.	"Beyond & Back (Live)"		2:45
8.	"Back 2 the Base (Live)"		0:30
9.	"Blue Spark (Alternate Mix)"		2:10
10.	"Some Other Time"		2:20
11.	"Sex and Dying in High Society (Demo)"		2:15
12.	"Motel Room in My Bed"		2:39
13.	"Heater (Rehearsal)"	Doe	2:31
14.	"The Once Over Twice (Live)"		2:51
15.	"Because I Do"		2:22
16.	"In This House That I Call Home"		3:33
17.	"Soul Kitchen (Demo)"	John Densmore, Robbie Krieger, Ray Manzarek, Jim Morrison	2:33
18.	"Universal Corner (Live)"		4:08
19.	"Delta 88 (Demo)"		1:25
20.	"Real Child of Hell (Alternate Mix)"		3:01
21.	"I'm Coming Over (Live)"		1:20
22.	"White Girl (Single Mix)"		3:29
23.	"Nausea (Live)"		3:07
24.	"Johny Hit and Run Paulene (Demo)"		2:54
25.	"Your Phone's off the Hook, But You're Not"		2:23
26.	"Riding with Mary (Single Mix)"		3:11
27.	"Nausea Spoken Word/End of Show Recording (Live)" (Hidden track)		2:00

Disc 2
No.	Title	Writer(s)	Length
1.	"The New World (Demo)"		3:35
2.	"Breathless (Single Mix)"	Otis Blackwell	2:16
3.	"Poor Girl"		2:51
4.	"What's Wrong with Me (Rough Mix)"		3:43
5.	"How I (Learned My Lesson) (Live)"		2:20
6.	"The Have Nots"		4:44
7.	"Someone Like You (Knitters Demo)"		3:05
8.	"The Stage (Demo)"		3:53
9.	"See How We Are (Demo)"		3:31
10.	"Surprise Surprise"		2:52
11.	"4th of July (Demo)"	Dave Alvin, Doe, Cervenka, D.J. Bonebrake, Tony Gilkyson	3:16
12.	"Arms for Hostages/Country at War (Demo)"		1:54
13.	"Wild Thing (Single Edit)"	Chip Taylor	3:29
14.	"Burning House of Love"		3:43
15.	"Devil Doll (Demo)"		3:11
16.	"True Love"		2:14
17.	"Call of the Wreckin' Ball" (from The Knitters' album "Poor Little Critter on the Road")	Alvin, Doe	2:56
18.	"In the Time It Takes (Demo)"		3:05
19.	"I Must Not Think Bad Thoughts (Alternate 1997 Mix)"		4:50
20.	"The Hungry Wolf (Instrumental Version)" (Hidden track)		3:47

== Personnel ==
X

- John Doe – bass, acoustic guitar, vocals
- Exene Cervenka – vocals
- Billy Zoom – guitar
- D.J. Bonebrake – drums

Additional personnel

- Ray Manzarek – organ
- Tony Gilkyson – guitar
