= Smoke & Fiction =

2024 studio album by X

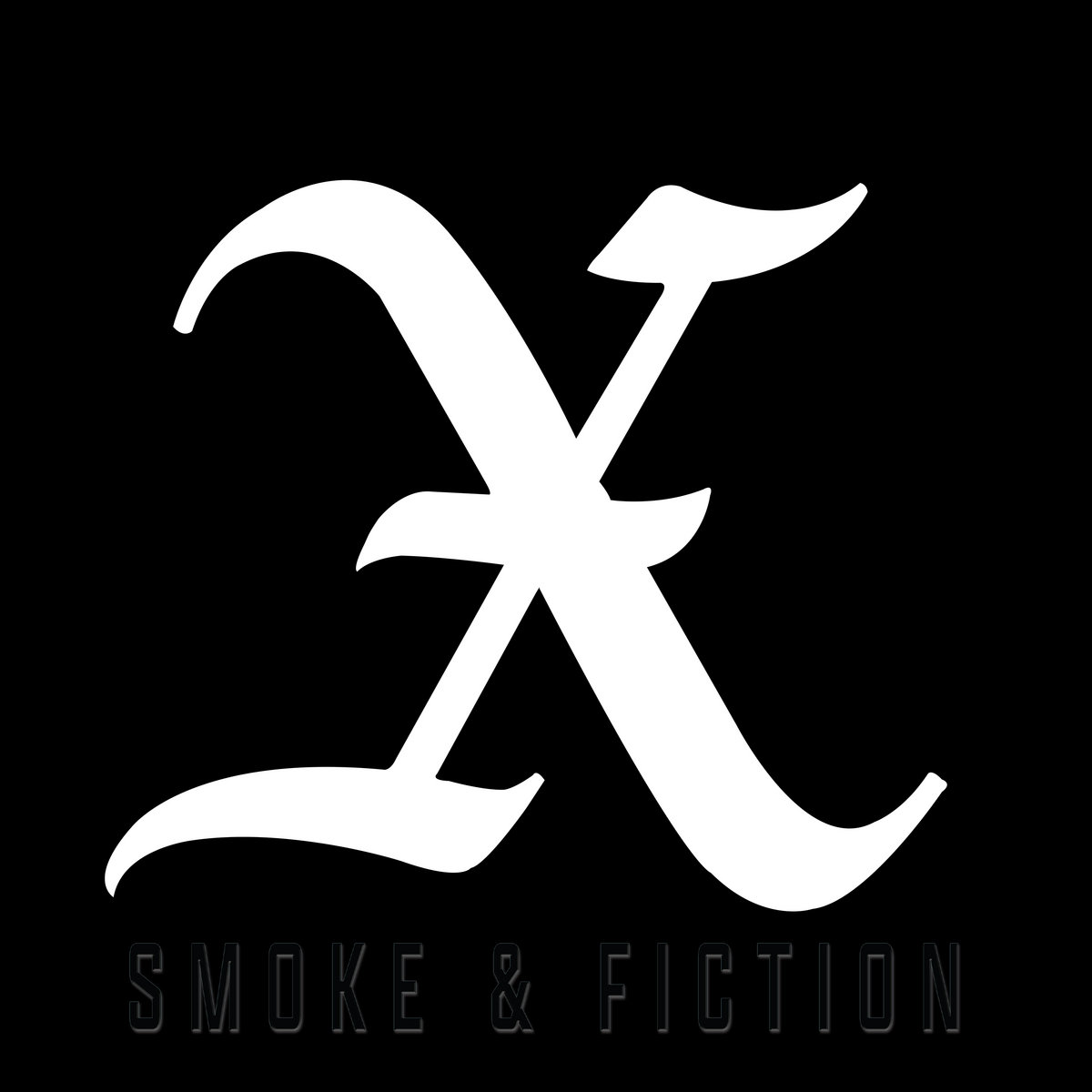

Studio album by X
- Released: August 2, 2024
- Studios: MANT, Eagle Rock, Los Angeles; Sunset Sound, Los Angeles
- Genre: Punk rock
- Length: 28:31
- Label: Fat Possum
- Producer: Rob Schnapf

X chronology
Alphabetland (2020)	Smoke & Fiction (2024)

Professional ratings
Review scores
Source	Rating
Paste	8.5/10 stars
Kerrang!	5/5 stars
AllMusic	4/5 stars
Under the Radar	8/10
Pitchfork	7.7/10 stars
Slant	mixed

"[Recording Smoke & Fiction] was taxing. I'm not sure we have the will or energy to do another. As for touring, I never want us to be a shadow of what we were, I want us to go out on top."

— X bassist and vocalist John Doe on the decision to end recording and touring

Smoke & Fiction is the ninth and final studio album by American punk rock band X. It was released on August 2, 2024. The band also promoted this release with the farewell tour The End Is Near, slated to last into 2025. The album was preceded by the singles "Big Black X" and "Ruby Church".

== Reception ==
Peter Larsen of Los Angeles Daily News called this release "a terrific record... with the band sounding as strong and inspired as ever, its 10 songs harking back lyrically to the band's early history, its sound closely following suit". Discussing lead single "Big Black X" at Stereogum, Tom Breihan stated that it "flashes back to the freewheeling, rockabilly-infused punk rock of their early records" and that "Exene Cervenka's voice sounds as intense and titanic as ever".

== Track listing ==
No.	Title	Length
1.	"Ruby Church"	2:07
2.	"Sweet Til the Bitter End"	2:31
3.	"The Way It Is"	3:29
4.	"Flipside"	3:00
5.	"Big Black X"	3:34
6.	"Smoke & Fiction"	3:04
7.	"Surreal"	2:19
8.	"Winding Up the Time"	2:52
9.	"Face in the Moon"	3:04
10.	"Baby & All"	2:31
Total length:		28:31

== Personnel ==
X

- DJ Bonebrake – drums, percussion
- Exene Cervenka – vocals
- John Doe – bass guitar, vocals
- Billy Zoom – guitar, bass guitar

Additional personnel

- Mark Chalecki – audio mastering at Little Red Book Mastering, Los Angeles, California, United States
- Rob Schnapf – production
- Matt Schuessler – audio engineering

== Charts ==
Chart performance for Smoke & Fiction
Chart (2024)	Peak position
UK Independent Albums (Official Charts)	49

== See also ==
- 2024 in American music
- 2024 in rock music
