= See How We Are =

Studio album by X
- Released: 1987
- Recorded: 1987
- Studio: Rumbo (Los Angeles)
- Genre: Roots rock
- Length: 37:00 (Original LP); 58:07 (2002 CD reissue)
- Label: Elektra
- Producer: Alvin Clark

X chronology
Ain't Love Grand! (1985)	See How We Are (1987)	Live at the Whisky a Go-Go (1988)

Singles from See How We Are
- 1. "4th of July" Released: 1987; 2. "See How We Are" Released: 1987

See How We Are is the sixth studio album by American rock band X, released in 1987 by Elektra Records. It was their first album without founding guitarist Billy Zoom, who was replaced by ex-Blasters guitarist Dave Alvin for the album's recording sessions and some live shows. Alvin left X on good terms and was replaced by Tony Gilkyson.

It was reissued with five bonus tracks by Rhino in 2002.

"4th of July" appeared on the TV show The Sopranos, where it was played in the end credits to the 2006 episode "Live Free or Die".

== Critical reception ==
Professional ratings
Review scores
Source	Rating
AllMusic	3.5/5 stars
The Encyclopedia of Popular Music	2/5 stars
Spin Alternative Record Guide	4/10
The Village Voice	B

Robert Christgau reviewed the album in his 1987 "Consumer Guide" column for The Village Voice:

"Even during the first four songs, when the sustained detail of the writing--with a boost from Dave Alvin's tormented yet unembittered '4th of July'—makes it seems [sic] they'll fight for every inch, you miss Billy Zoom's syncretic junk: fine though he is, Tony Gilkyson is too neoclassy for these convinced vulgarians. Then the material devolves into complaints, throwaways, wasted stanzas, and utter clinkers."

Rolling Stone wrote that X "adjusts to the challenge of guitarist Billy Zoom's departure by tightening up, discarding the gratuitous poetics of some of its lyrics and stating its case as succinctly as it has since its 1982 signpost, Wild Gift." Trouser Press considers the album superior to Poor Little Critter on the Road, released in 1985 by X side project The Knitters, writing that Alvin contributes "two of his most heart-rending compositions" and generally "[brings] the band back to earth, restoring its confidence". They describe the album as a "polished platter [that] cooks on desperate rockers like the lead-off "I'm Lost" then tugs at the heartstrings with "You," an old-fashioned love lament even non-fans should appreciate." Rob Sheffield, writing in the Spin Alternative Record Guide (1995), bemoans the "massive loss of sonic energy" resulting from Gilkyson joining the band, and believes "4th of July" is the only good new song, noting that "while the rest of it is competent roots-rock, it's self-pitying gloom without the noisy catharsis of Wild Gift."

== Track listing ==
All tracks written by Exene Cervenka and John Doe except as indicated.

Side 1

1. "I'm Lost" – 2:55
2. "You" – 3:28
3. "4th of July" (Dave Alvin) – 3:32
4. "In the Time It Takes" – 3:09
5. "Anyone Can Fill Your Shoes" – 2:45
6. "See How We Are" – 3:46

Side 2

1. "Left & Right" – 2:57
2. "When It Rains..." – 4:29
3. "Holiday Story" – 3:36
4. "Surprise, Surprise" – 2:50
5. "Cyrano de Berger's Back" (John Doe) – 3:33

Bonus tracks (2002 reissue)

1. "Holiday Story" (Demo/Remix) – 4:00
2. "I'm Lost" (Demo/Remix) – 2:48
3. "Highway 61 Revisited" (Bob Dylan) (Outtake/Rough Mix) – 5:08
4. "In the Time It Takes" (Demo/Remix) – 3:08
5. "See How We Are" (Demo/Remix) – 3:57
6. (untitled hidden track) – 2:06

== Personnel ==
X

- D.J. Bonebrake – drums, percussion
- Exene Cervenka – vocals
- Tony Gilkyson – guitars
- John Doe – vocals, bass

Additional personnel

- Dave Alvin – guitar, six-string bass
- Benmont Tench – Hammond organ, Casiotone

== Charts ==
Sales chart performance for See How We Are
Chart	Peak	Date	Duration
Billboard 200	107	July 31, 1987	11 weeks
