= X – Live in Los Angeles =

Live album by X
- Released: May 10, 2005
- Recorded: November 24, 2004
- Venues: House of Blues-Sunset Strip, West Hollywood, California, United States
- Genre: Punk rock
- Length: 64:04
- Label: Shout! Factory
- Producer: Billy Zoom

X chronology
The Best: Make the Music Go Bang! (2004)	X – Live in Los Angeles (2005)	Merry Xmas from X (2009)

X – Live in Los Angeles is a live album by American rock band X released May 10, 2005, by Shout! Factory on compact disc and DVD. The concert was recorded on Thanksgiving 2004 as a tribute to the 25th anniversary of their debut album, Los Angeles. DVD bonus features included acoustic duets by Exene Cervenka and John Doe on "See How We Are" and "True Love" and a photo gallery from Billy Zoom.

== Critical reception ==
Professional ratings
Review scores
Source	Rating
AllMusic	4/5 stars
Stylus	A−

The editorial staff of AllMusic Guide gave the release four out of five stars, with reviewer Mark Deming, writing that the band is "still in full command of their very impressive faculties", with each member of the band giving a praiseworthy performance and calling it "big, loud, dangerous fun". Will Layman of PopMatters also reviews the musicianship of the band, calling them "a revival act, playing the great old songs" and writing that the concert itself is fun, with an opportunity for X to "deliver the goods". Jason Schneider of Exclaim! called the release "a great treat for long-time fans and a nice introduction for curious newcomers". Rock critic Robert Christgau's brief review calls it the "live album... their songbook have long deserved". Christopher Alexander of cokemachineglow admits to caution about possibly viewing an embarrassing nostalgia act but calls it a "far cry from embarrassing. It’s not the best statement of their career, but it is the best statement of their career right now. That means it’s a passionate, honest, and above-all legitimate reading of their catalogue, even if the songs are over twenty years old." Writing for Stylus, Matt Cibula gave the release an A−, writing that some of the songs have increased relevance over the years and concluding his review by writing, "the four of them are having more fun than any other band in the world".

IGN's Peter Schorn agrees that it's a good introduction for new fans, writing that the performances are good but the direction of the concert film is "pedestrian and tends to make the similar-sounding material look unexciting": he gave the performance and audio seven out of 10, the video a six, and the packaging and extras a three. DVD Talk also reviewed the components of the home video release, with four out of five stars for the content, audio, and video; 2.5 for the extras; and 3.5 for its replay value, with reviewer Randy Miller III summing it up as "a nice package that pays tribute to a truly underrated band".

== Track listing ==
All songs written by Exene Cervenka and John Doe, except where noted.

No.	Title	Writer(s)	Length
1.	"Your Phone's Off the Hook, But You're Not"		2:47
2.	"In This House That I Call Home"		3:41
3.	"We're Desperate"		2:24
4.	"Beyond & Back"		3:00
5.	"White Girl"		4:07
6.	"The Unheard Music"		4:13
7.	"Los Angeles"		3:18
8.	"True Love"		2:15
9.	"I'm Coming Over"		1:24
10.	"Blue Spark"		2:47
11.	"The New World"		3:05
12.	"Nausea"		4:17
13.	"Johny Hit and Run Paulene"		3:09
14.	"Motel Room in My Bed"		2:39
15.	"It's Who You Know"		2:58
16.	"Because I Do"		2:25
17.	"Devil Doll"		3:50
18.	"The Hungry Wolf"		2:57
19.	"Year 1"		1:26
20.	"The World's a Mess, It's in My Kiss"		4:19
21.	"Soul Kitchen"	John Densmore, Robby Krieger, Ray Manzarek, and Jim Morrison	3:03
Total length:			64:04

== Personnel ==
X

- D. J. Bonebrake – drums
- Exene Cervenka – vocals
- John Doe – bass guitar, vocals
- Billy Zoom – guitar, mixing

Production

- Shawn Amos – executive production
- Clint Bennett – project assistance
- Amber Cordero – project assistance
- Ron DeBlasio – executive production
- Flea – liner notes
- Beth Herzhaft – photography
- Dan Kollar – engineering
- Matt Levine – project assistance
- Kristene Lew – project assistance
- Shane Moody – editorial supervision
- Whitney Padgett – project assistance
- Jeff Palo – project assistance
- John Roberts – artwork, packaging
- Mike Rouse – project assistance
- Courtney Schoor – project assistance
- Matt Wignall – engineering
