= Exene Cervenka =

American singer (born 1956)

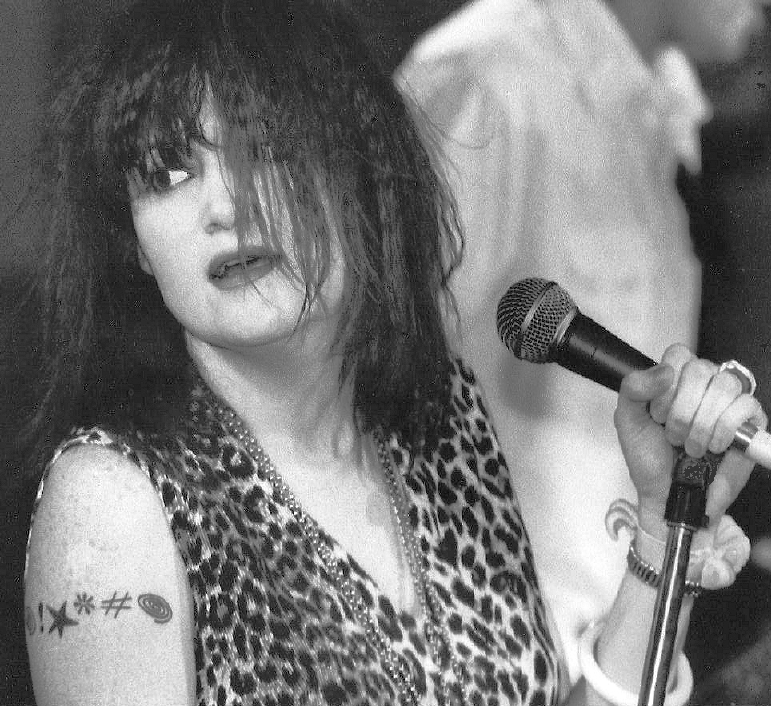
- Cervenka at The Chestnut Cabaret in 1986

Background information
- Also known as: Exene; Exene Cervenková; Christine Notmyrealname
- Born: Christene Lee Cervenka; February 1, 1956 (age 70); Chicago, Illinois, U.S.
- Origin: Los Angeles, California, U.S.
- Genres: Punk; folk; rock
- Occupations: Singer, poet, visual artist
- Years active: 1978–present
- Labels: Bloodshot; Rhino; Kill Rock Stars; Nitro; 2.13.61; Rykodisc; Freeway
- Website: exenecervenka.net

Exene Cervenka (born Christene Lee Cervenka; February 1, 1956) is an American singer, artist, and poet. She is best known for her work as a singer in the California punk rock band X.

== Music career ==
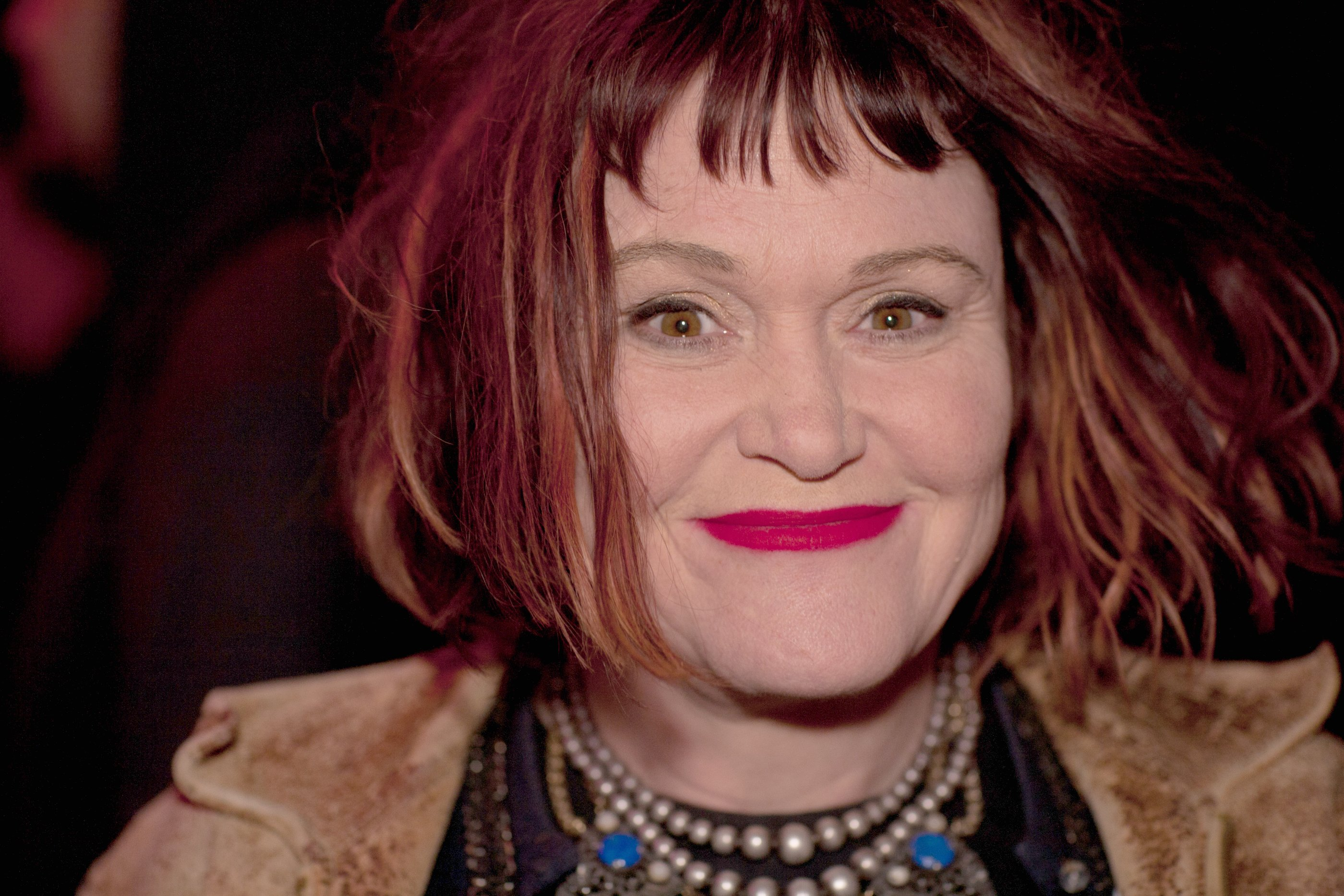
Cervenka at SXSW 2010

The 21-year-old Cervenka met 23-year-old musician John Doe at a poetry workshop at the Beyond Baroque Foundation in Venice, Los Angeles. Cervenka started working there.

Billy Zoom (guitar) and John Doe (bass and vocals) founded X in 1977, with D.J. Bonebrake coming aboard as drummer. Doe asked Cervenka to join soon after as a co-lead vocalist, and the duo were also the band's primary songwriters. They released their debut album, Los Angeles, in 1980 and, over the next six years, five more albums.

She learned to play guitar from Dave Alvin of the Blasters.

=== Collaborations ===
In 1982, Cervenka published Adulterers Anonymous, her first in a series of four books in collaboration with artist Lydia Lunch. She and Lunch also released a spoken word album, Rude Hieroglyphics, in 1996 and toured in support of the project.

From 1996 to 1999, John Roecker and Cervenka co-owned the Los Angeles store You've Got Bad Taste. The store specialized in kitsch and various "off-color" novelties.

In 1999, as Exene Červenková, she appeared in the cult video Decoupage 2000: Return of the Goddess, along with guests Karen Black and the band L7. She gave a reading of her poem "They Must Be Angels" and appeared in an interview skit with Decoupage 2000 hostess Summer Caprice.

== Art career ==
In 2005, Cervenka's journals and mixed media collages were exhibited in a one-person exhibition titled America the Beautiful at the Santa Monica Museum of Art. The exhibit was curated by Kristine McKenna and Michael Duncan. An expanded version of the exhibition traveled to DCKT Contemporary in New York in January 2006.

== Personal life ==
=== Relationships ===
Cervenka was married to John Doe from 1980 to 1985. She met her second husband Viggo Mortensen in 1986 on the set of the comedy Salvation!, a parody of televangelism. Mortensen played her husband Jerome. They married on July 8, 1987. On January 28, 1988, Cervenka gave birth to a son, Henry Blake Mortensen. Mortensen and Cervenka lived in Idaho for three years. They separated in 1992, and were divorced in 1997.

Cervenka married musician Jason Edge, who went on to play in her band Original Sinners. Edge and Cervenka are now divorced.

=== Residence ===
Arriving in 1969 from Illinois, Cervenka lived in St. Petersburg and other locations in Central Florida during her teenage years, experiencing the tail end of segregation. She worked a variety of odd jobs to support her family, most notably in the toy department of the locally infamous department store Webb's City.

Cervenka moved from Los Angeles to Jefferson City, Missouri, for four years, and then returned to Southern California. She now lives in Orange County.

=== Health ===
On June 2, 2009, Cervenka disclosed that she had been diagnosed with multiple sclerosis. Well before this diagnosis, she and X had actively supported Sweet Relief, a charity that aids uninsured artists. Sweet Relief was begun by musician Victoria Williams when she herself was diagnosed with MS. In 2011, Cervenka said she may have been misdiagnosed. However, Cervenka had to cancel a Spring 2011 tour due to problems associated with her MS. In 2015, John Doe said that the MS diagnosis was incorrect, and that Cervenka had consulted with other doctors who were not able to diagnose her.

== Discography ==
=== X ===
==== Singles, soundtracks, compilations, etc. ====
- 1978: "Adult Books"/"We're Desperate" 7" (Dangerhouse Records)
- 1979: Yes L.A. compilation (Dangerhouse Records)
- 1980: The Decline of Western Civilization soundtrack (Spheeris Films/Slash Records): "Beyond and Back", "Johnny Hit and Run Paulene", "Nausea", "Unheard Music", "We're Desperate"
- 1980: No Questions Asked by Flesh Eaters (Slash Records)
- 1982: Urgh! A Music War soundtrack (A&M Records)

==== Albums ====
- 1980: Los Angeles (Slash Records)
- 1981: Wild Gift (Slash Records)
- 1982: Under the Big Black Sun (Elektra Records)
- 1983: More Fun in the New World (Elektra Records)
- 1985: Ain't Love Grand! (Elektra Records)
- 1987: See How We Are (Elektra Records/Asylum Records)
- 1988: Live at the Whisky a Go-Go (Elektra/Asylum Records)
- 1993: Hey Zeus! (Big Life Records)
- 1995: Unclogged (Infidelity Recordings/Sunset Boulevard)
- 1997: Beyond and Back: The X Anthology (Elektra Records)
- 2004: The Best: Make the Music Go Bang! (Elektra Records/Rhino Records)
- 2005: X – Live in Los Angeles (Shout! Factory)
- 2020: Alphabetland (Fat Possum Records)
- 2024: Smoke & Fiction (Fat Possum Records)

=== The Knitters ===
- 1985: Poor Little Critter on the Road (Slash Records/Rhino Records)
- 2005: The Modern Sounds of the Knitters (Zoë Records)

=== Solo ===
- 1989: Old Wives' Tales (Rhino Records)
- 1990: Running Sacred (RNA (Rhino New Artists))
- 1994: Exene Cervenka (Wordcore Volume 7) 7" (Kill Rock Stars)
- 1995: Surface To Air Serpents (213CD/Thirsty Ear Recordings)
- 2009: Somewhere Gone (Bloodshot Records)
- 2011: The Excitement of Maybe (Bloodshot Records)

==== Bands ====
- 1997: Life Could Be a Dream as Auntie Christ (Lookout Records)
- 2002: Original Sinners as Original Sinners (Nitro Records)
- 2006: Sev7en as Exene Cervenka and the Original Sinners (Nitro Records)

==== Other ====
- 1985: Wanda Coleman, Exene Cervenka: Twin Sisters LP (Freeway). Poetry performance recorded at McCabe's Guitar Shop, Santa Monica, CA on February 1, 1985.
- 1995: Lydia Lunch & Exene Cervenka: Rude Hieroglyphics (Rykodisc). Recorded live at the Sapphire Supper Club, Orlando, FL on March 20, 1995.
- 1999: Decoupage 2000: Return of the Goddess. Read poem "They Must Be Angels" and appeared in an interview skit.
- 2012: John Doe & Exene Cervenka: Singing and Playing (Moonlight Graham Records). Recorded at Way Station April 2–3, 2010.

=== Additional musical contributions ===
- 1994: Applegate, Christina, and Elizabeth Pena. Across the Moon. Los Angeles, CA: Hemdale Home Video, 1994. ISBN 978-1-569-20068-1 Music composed by Christopher Tyng & Exene Cervenka
- 1996: Honor: A Benefit for the Honor the Earth Campaign (Daemon Records). "The Future is a War" by Exene Cervenka
- 1997: G.I. Jane original soundtrack (Hollywood Records). "The Future is a War" by Auntie Christ
- 1999: One Man's Meat by Viggo Mortensen (Lightning Creek). Features Exene Cervenka on vocals, guitar
- 2000: Stoned Immaculate: The Music of The Doors (Elektra Records). "Children of Night" by Perry Farrell and Exene
- 2001: Punk-o-rama 2001, Vol. 6 (Epitaph Records). "We're Desperate" by Pennywise with Exene
- 2002: Rise Above: 24 Black Flag Songs to Benefit the West Memphis Three (Sanctuary). "Wasted" by Exene Cervenka
- 2009: The People Speak original soundtrack (Verve Records). "See How We Are" by Exene Cervenka & John Doe
- 2011: Kings and Queens by Blackie and the Rodeo Kings (Dramatico). "Made of Love" featuring Exene Cervenka
- 2018: "Queen for a Day" by Skating Polly featuring and also written by Exene Cervenka
- 2018: "Destroying Angels" by Garbage with John Doe and Exene Cervenka

=== Video ===
- The Decline of Western Civilization (1981)
- Urgh! A Music War (1982)
- X: The Unheard Music (1985/1987, video; 1986/1987/2004, DVD; re-released 2011 Silver Anniversary Edition)
- X - Live in Los Angeles (2005) – Shout! Factory: Concert by X in Los Angeles recorded live on November 26 and 27, 2004 ISBN 978-0-738-93185-2

== Works or publications ==
- Lunch, Lydia, and Exene Cervenka. Adulterers Anonymous. New York: Grove Press, 1982. ISBN 978-0-394-62412-9
- The 1984 Calendar of Olympic Games, Music & Orwellian Dates. 1984, n.d. Produced by M. Hyatt, Exene Cervenka and 53 mail artists from around the world.
- Bad Day: A Short Film by Modi Frank and Exene Cervenka. (1986)
- Mohr, Bill, and Sheree Levin. Poetry Loves Poetry: An Anthology of Los Angeles Poets. Santa Monica, CA: Momentum Press, 1985. ISBN 978-0-936-05450-6
- Jarecke, Kenneth, and Exene Cervenka. Just Another War. Joliet, Mont: Bedrock Press, 1992. ISBN 978-0-963-47840-5
- Cervenka, Exene. Virtual Unreality. Los Angeles: 2.13.61 Publications, 1993. ISBN 978-1-880-98515-1
- Cervenka, Exene. "Consumption." Details Magazine, July 1993. (poem)
- Cervenka, Exene. "Acres of Defeat." Raygun Magazine, Dec./Jan 1993. (article)
- Cervenka, Exene. "Midnight Black." L.A. Weekly Magazine, Best of L.A. Issue, 1993. (poem)
- Lake, Bambi, and Alvin Orloff. The Unsinkable Bambi Lake: A Fairy Tale Containing the Dish on Cockettes, Punks, and Angels. San Francisco: Manic D Press, 1996. ISBN 978-0-916-39742-5 Introduction by Exene Cervenka
- Snowden, Don, and Gary Leonard. Make the Music Go Bang!: The Early L.A. Punk Scene. New York: St. Martin's Griffin, 1997. ISBN 978-0-312-16912-1 "Halos Above Our Horns" by Exene Cervenkova. (essay)
- Rollins, Henry. The Best of 2.13.61 Publications. Los Angeles: 2.13.61 Publications, 1998. ISBN 978-1-880-98562-5 (excerpts from "Virtual Unreality")
- Maybe, Ellyn, and Exene Cervenka. The Cowardice of Amnesia. Los Angeles: 2.13.61 Publications, 1998. ISBN 978-1-880-98558-8
- Hyatt, Michael, and Exene Cervenka. Lucky 13 Postcards. Los Angeles, Calif: s.n., 2000.
- Cervenka, Exene. A Beer on Every Page. 2002.
- Jocoy, Jim, Thurston Moore, and Exene Cervenka. We're Desperate: The Punk Photography of Jim Jocoy : SF/LA 78–80. New York, NY: PowerHouse Books, 2002. ISBN 978-1-576-87156-0 "Slivery Moon" (essay)
- Kihn, Greg. Carved in Rock: Short Stories by Musicians. New York: Thunder's Mouth Press, 2003. ISBN 978-1-560-25453-9 features short story "Perfect World from Virtual Unreality" by Exene Cervenka
- Cervenka, Exene, and Viggo Mortensen. Magical Meteorite Songwriting Device: Collages. Santa Monica, CA: Perceval Press, 2006. ISBN 978-0-976-30092-2

=== Exhibitions ===
==== One-person exhibitions ====
- America the Beautiful. Santa Monica Museum of Art (September 17 – November 26, 2005)
- America the Beautiful. DCKT Contemporary (January 7 – February 11, 2006)
- A Fifth of Tomorrow. Collages and journals. Western Project (June 9 – July 14, 2007)
- Sleep in Spite of Thunder. DCKT Contemporary (May 23 – July 18, 2008)

==== Two-person exhibitions ====
- Exene Cervenka and Wayne White: We're Not The Jet Set. Paintings, collages and sculptures. Western Project (July 25 – September 5, 2009)

==== Group exhibitions ====
- Hollywood Satan. Mark Moore Gallery, Santa Monica, CA (December 5–25, 1998)
- Forming: The Early Days of L.A. Punk. Track 16 Gallery, Santa Monica, CA (April 10 – June 15, 1999)
- Capital Art: On the Culture of Punishment. Track 16 Gallery, Santa Monica, CA (February 3 – March 31, 2001)
- Cruel And Unusual: A Benefit For The West Memphis Three. sixspace, Los Angeles, CA (2003)
- Vexing: Female Voices from East L.A. Punk. Claremont Museum of Art, Claremont, CA (May 18 – August 31, 2008); Museo de las Artes, Universidad de Guadalajara, Guadalajara, Mexico (2008–2009)
- Yard Dog, Austin, TX (2009)
- Celestial Ash: Assemblages from Los Angeles. Craft and Folk Art Museum, Los Angeles, CA (April 11 – September 13, 2009)
- Western Project: The First Six Years. Western Project, Culver City, CA (November 7 – December 30, 2009)
- Tanya Batura / Exene Cervenka / Amir H. Fallah / Will Yackulic. Western Project, Culver City, CA (August 14 – September 11, 2010)
- Never Can Say Goodbye, No Longer Empty. at former Tower Records Store, West 4th Street & Broadway, New York, NY (2010)
- Girls Just Want to Have Funds. P.P.O.W Gallery, New York, NY (2010)
- DCKT @ Miami Project. Midtown Art District (December 3–8, 2013)

==== Exhibition catalogs ====
- Bessy, Claude, and Edward Colver. Forming: The Early Days of L.A. Punk. Santa Monica, CA: Smart Art Press, 2000. ISBN 978-1-889-19544-5 Track 16 Gallery (April 10 – June 5, 1999). Cervenka was co-editor, essay: "Forming: the Early Days of L.A. Punk"
- Botey, Mariana, and Pilar Perez. Capitalart: On the Culture of Punishment. Santa Monica, CA: Smart Art Press, 2001. ISBN 978-1-889-19546-9 Track 16 Gallery (February 3 – March 31, 2001)
- Cervenka, Exene. Exene Cervenka: America the Beautiful. Santa Monica, CA: Smart Art Press, 2005.

== See also ==
- List of female rock singers
- X (American band)
