= More Fun =

More Fun may refer to:

- More Fun Comics, one of the earliest American comic-book series
- More Fun, a defunct webcomic by Shaenon K. Garrity

== See also ==
- More Fund Comics, a benefit publication by the Comic Book Legal Defense Fund
- More Fun Than an Open Casket Funeral, an album by the band The Accüsed
- More Fun in the New World, an album by the band X
