= Old Wives' Tales (album) =

Studio album by Exene Cervenka
- Released: 1989
- Genre: Folk, folk rock
- Label: Rhino
- Producer: Tony Gilkyson

Exene Cervenka chronology
Old Wives' Tales (1989)	Running Sacred (1990)

Old Wives' Tales is an album by the American musician Exene Cervenka, released in 1989. Cervenka told the Los Angeles Times that she considered the album to be "for and about women."

"He's Got a She" peaked at No. 17 on Billboard's Modern Rock Tracks chart. Cervenka promoted the album by touring with the Oyster Band.

== Production ==
The album was produced by the former X guitarist Tony Gilkyson. Unlike in X, Cervenka contributed to both the album's music and lyrics; Cervenka had to reacquaint herself with playing the guitar. The songs were written in northern Idaho.

"Gravel" and "Famous Barmaid" include poetry recitations. Gilkyson's sister, Eliza, provided backing vocals on the album.

== Critical reception ==
Professional ratings
Review scores
Source	Rating
AllMusic	4.5/5 stars
Chicago Tribune	3/4 stars
Robert Christgau	B
The Encyclopedia of Popular Music	4/5 stars
MusicHound Rock: The Essential Album Guide	2.5/5 stars
Orlando Sentinel	4/5 stars
Ottawa Citizen	4/5 stars
The Rolling Stone Album Guide	1/5 stars

The Chicago Reader called the album "a surpassingly melodic manifesto on what can only be called post-postpunk feminism and romanticism." The New York Times thought that, "as in X, Ms. Cervenka's lyrics conjure an American panorama of prosaic hopes and romantic friction." The Globe and Mail wrote that it is the "casual musical eclecticism, along with Exene's ability to toss off lines like 'She believes in a God who's all thumbs,' that make Old Wives' Tales interesting."

Robert Christgau stated: "Always a notebook-toter, she goes for the roots and poetry you'd expect—in other words, folk-rock." Trouser Press determined that "the tasteful and varied mixture of folk, country, recitation and sturdy rock isn’t that great a stylistic leap from the essence of X." The Orlando Sentinel concluded that if Cervenka "didn't have a punk-rock past, her solo debut might win her a place among country-Western New Traditionalists such as Lyle Lovett and K.D. Lang." The Toronto Star opined that, while Cervenka "doggedly wrestles with the empty romance of poverty-stricken America," the album "comes replete with suspect vocals and arrangements."

AllMusic called Old Wives' Tales "a charming, timeless album of mostly quiet, quirky folk music." The Rolling Stone Album Guide deemed the songs "wordy and pretentious."

== Track listing ==
No.	Title	Length
1.	"She Wanted"
2.	"Biggest Memory"
3.	"Here Come the Crucifiers"
4.	"Cocktail Trees"
5.	"Famous Barmaid"
6.	"Leave Heaven Alone"
7.	"Good Luck"
8.	"White Trash Wife"
9.	"He's Got a She"
10.	"Gravel"
11.	"Coyote on the Town"
