= Live in Los Angeles =

Live in Los Angeles may refer to:

- Live in Los Angeles (Paul McCartney album), 2010
- Live in Los Angeles (X album), 2005
- Live in Los Angeles (Zameer album), 2010
- Live from Los Angeles, a 1967 album by Oliver Nelson
