= More Fun in the New World =

Studio album by X
- Released: 1983
- Recorded: 1983
- Studio: Cherokee (Hollywood)
- Genres: Punk rock, rock
- Length: 41:11 (Original LP); 58:02 (2002 CD reissue)
- Label: Elektra
- Producer: Ray Manzarek

X chronology
| Under the Big Black Sun (1982) | More Fun in the New World (1983) | Ain't Love Grand! (1985) |

Singles from More Fun in the New World
- 1. "The New World" Released: 1983; 2. "True Love Pt. #2" Released: 1983

More Fun in the New World is the fourth studio album by American rock band X, released in 1983 by Elektra Records. It was reissued with four bonus tracks by Rhino Records in 2002 and was the final X album produced by Ray Manzarek. The band supported the album with a North American tour.

The single "The New World" appeared on the soundtrack to the 1986 movie Something Wild. Pearl Jam's Eddie Vedder and Supersuckers covered "Devil Doll" and "Poor Girl" for the Free the West Memphis 3 project in 2000, but only "Poor Girl" made it on the release; Pearl Jam also covered "The New World" and "I Must Not Think Bad Thoughts" with Tim Robbins live during the 2004 Vote for Change tour. In 2023, "Poor Girl" was featured on the soundtrack for Guardians of the Galaxy Vol. 3.

== Production ==
X somewhat moved away from songs drawn from personal experience to lyrics that explored social themes and current events. "Breathless" is a cover of the song made famous by Jerry Lee Lewis; it played during the end credits of Breathless.

== Critical reception ==
Professional ratings
Review scores
| Source | Rating |
|---|---|
| AllMusic | 4.5/5 stars |
| Robert Christgau | A− |
| Rolling Stone | 4/5 stars |
| Spin Alternative Record Guide | 9/10 |

The Philadelphia Daily News noted that, "with help from a vocal coach, Exene is starting to sound like a genuine singer instead of a mere squawker, and the whole group seems to be benefitting musically from its association with producer Ray Manzarek."

== Track listing ==
All tracks written by John Doe and Exene Cervenka except as indicated.

Side A

1. "The New World" – 3:25
2. "We're Having Much More Fun" – 3:05
3. "True Love" – 2:15
4. "Poor Girl" – 2:50
5. "Make the Music Go Bang" – 3:00
6. "Breathless" (Otis Blackwell) – 2:15
7. "I Must Not Think Bad Thoughts" – 4:10

Side B

1. "Devil Doll" – 3:05
2. "Painting the Town Blue" – 3:20
3. "Hot House" – 2:55
4. "Drunk in My Past" – 2:51
5. "I See Red" – 3:00
6. "True Love Pt. #2" – 5:00

Bonus tracks (2002 reissue)

1. "Poor Girl" (Demo/Remix) – 2:58
2. "True Love Pt. #2" (Demo/Remix) – 4:56
3. "Devil Doll" (Demo/Remix) – 3:12
4. "I Must Not Think Bad Thoughts" (Demo/Remix) – 5:45

== Personnel ==
X

- Billy Zoom – guitar
- D.J. Bonebrake – drums, percussion
- Exene Cervenka – vocals
- John X. Doe – vocals, bass

== Charts ==
Sales chart performance for More Fun in the New World
| Chart | Peak | Date | Duration |
|---|---|---|---|
| The Billboard 200 | 86 | October 28, 1983 | 23 weeks |
