= Under the Big Black Sun =

Studio album by X
- Released: July 1982
- Recorded: 1982
- Studio: Cherokee (Hollywood)
- Genre: Punk rock
- Length: 33:45 (Original LP); 48:41 (2001 CD reissue)
- Label: Elektra
- Producer: Ray Manzarek

X chronology
Wild Gift (1981)	Under the Big Black Sun (1982)	More Fun in the New World (1983)

Singles from Album
- 1. "Blue Spark" Released: 1982; 2. "Motel Room in My Bed" Released: 1982

Under the Big Black Sun is the third studio album, and major label debut, by American rock band X. It was released on Elektra Records in July 1982 and reissued on Rhino Records in 2001 with bonus tracks. It was re-released in its original format by Fat Possum Records in 2018.

Under the Big Black Sun marked a departure from their trademark sound. While still fast and loud, with raw punk guitars, the album displayed evolving country leanings. The album was influenced by the death of Cervenka's elder sister Mirielle in a 1980 car accident. Three songs on the album ("Riding with Mary", "Come Back to Me" and the title track) all directly relate to the tragedy. A fourth, a high-speed version of Al Dubin and Joe Burke's 1930 "Dancing with Tears in My Eyes", was, years later, indirectly attributed to Cervenka's mournful state of mind. The stark black-and-white cover art and title were also a reflection of the somber mood of the band during this time. Cervenka has said it is her favorite X album.

The cover art illustration was drawn by Alfred Harris.

== Reception ==
Professional ratings
Review scores
Source	Rating
AllMusic	5/5 stars
Entertainment Weekly	B+
Rolling Stone	4/5 stars
The Rolling Stone Album Guide	4/5 stars
Sounds	5/5 stars
The Village Voice	A−

In The Boston Phoenix, Sally Cragin reviewed the album in terms of the relationship between the band’s married leaders, singer Exene Cervenka and bassist/singer John Doe, "who set themselves apart by making their marriage into a public paradigm for love in the LA ruins." Cragin felt that "Under the Big Black Sun's producer, Ray Manzarek, wisely keeps out of view, letting X's meaty dance reverberations speak for themselves. But the honeymoon is over for John and Exene's songwriting. Whereas Wild Gift balanced their voices, Big Black Sun certifies their nimble moves without advancing them. The discovery of married tension songs has turned into a self-conscious trademark... Now, the main cliffhanger is: will John and Exene survive as a major-label marriage?"

== Track listing ==
All tracks written by John Doe and Exene Cervenka except where noted.

=== Side A ===
No.	Title	Length
1.	"The Hungry Wolf"	3:45
2.	"Motel Room in My Bed"	2:32
3.	"Riding with Mary"	3:40
4.	"Come Back to Me"	3:43
5.	"Under the Big Black Sun"	3:23
Total length:		17:03

=== Side B ===
No.	Title	Writer(s)	Length
1.	"Because I Do"		2:21
2.	"Blue Spark"		2:06
3.	"Dancing with Tears in My Eyes"	Al Dubin, Joe Burke	2:20
4.	"Real Child of Hell"		2:59
5.	"How I (Learned My Lesson)"		2:12
6.	"The Have Nots"		4:44
Total length:			16:42 33:45

=== Bonus tracks (2001 CD reissue) ===
No.	Title	Writer(s)	Length
1.	"Riding with Mary" (Single Version)		3:12
2.	"X Rewrites 'El Paso'" (Rehearsal)/"Because I Do" (TV Mix/Instrumental)"	Marty Robbins, Cervenka, Doe	2:56
3.	"Universal Corner" (Live)		4:08
4.	"Breathless" (Single Mix)	Otis Blackwell	2:20
5.	"How I (Learned My Lesson)" (Live)		2:20
Total length:			48:41

== Personnel ==
X

- John Doe – bass, vocals
- Exene Cervenka – vocals
- Billy Zoom – guitar, saxophone, clarinet
- D.J. Bonebrake – drums, marimba vibes, percussion

Additional personnel

- Ray Manzarek – keyboards on "Riding with Mary" (Single version)

== Charts ==
Sales chart performance for Under the Big Black Sun
Chart	Peak	Date	Duration
Billboard Pop Albums	76	August 20, 1982	15 weeks
