= Merry Xmas from X =

Merry Xmas From X

EP by X
- Released: October 9, 2009
- Recorded: 2009
- Genres: Rock, Christmas
- Length: 5:33
- Label: Anko

X chronology
Live in Los Angeles (2005)	Merry Xmas From X (2009)	Alphabetland (2020)

Merry Xmas From X is a two-track EP by the American rock band X, released on October 9, 2009, by Anko Records. It consists of two classic Christmas songs, "Santa Claus Is Coming to Town" and "Jingle Bells", and was distributed only as a digital download.

== Critical reception ==
Professional ratings
Review scores
Source	Rating
The List	3/5

The British magazine The List reviewed the EP, noting the "wicked jingly-jangly guitar solo" in "Santa Claus Is Coming to Town", but noting that it had little chart potential and was "a missed opportunity for fresh material".

== Track listing ==
No.	Title	Writer(s)	Length
1.	"Santa Claus Is Coming to Town"	J. Fred Coots, Haven Gillespie	2:09
2.	"Jingle Bells"	James Lord Pierpont	3:24
Total length:			5:33
