= Live at the Whisky a Go-Go (X album) =

Live album by X
- Released: April 29, 1988
- Recorded: December 13, December 15–16, 1987
- Venues: Record Plant Mobile, Whisky A Go-Go (West Hollywood), Rumbo Recorders (Canoga Park)
- Genre: Punk rock
- Length: 81:16 (LP version); 71:12 (CD version)
- Label: Elektra
- Producer: Alvin Clark

X chronology
See How We Are (1987)	Live at the Whisky a Go-Go (1988)	Hey Zeus! (1993)

Professional ratings
Review scores
Source	Rating
AllMusic	3/5 stars
Robert Christgau	B+
Rolling Stone	3/5 stars

Live at the Whisky a Go-Go on the Fabulous Sunset Strip is the seventh album and first live album by American rock band X, released on April 29, 1988, by Elektra Records. The album was recorded on December 13, 15, and 16, 1987, at the Whisky a Go Go in West Hollywood, California, United States.

Three of the tracks ("In the Time It Takes," "Just Another Perfect Day," and "True Love") were only included on the vinyl version but omitted from the compact disc edition.

== Track listing ==
All songs written by John Doe and Exene Cervenka except as indicated.

=== Side one ===
1. "Los Angeles" – 2:54
2. "In This House That I Call Home" – 2:33
3. "The New World" – 3:00
4. "Around My Heart" – 4:19
5. "Surprise, Surprise" – 2:44
6. "Because I Do" – 2:22

=== Side two ===
1. "Burning House of Love" – 4:22
2. "My Goodness" – 4:05
3. "Blue Spark" – 2:13
4. "In the Time It Takes" – 2:55 (not included on CD release)
5. "The Once Over Twice" – 2:35
6. "Devil Doll" (includes excerpt of "Just Like Tom Thumb's Blues" (Bob Dylan)) – 4:27

=== Side three ===
1. "The Hungry Wolf" – 3:51
2. "Just Another Perfect Day" – 4:33 (not included on CD release)
3. "Unheard Music" – 4:10
4. "Riding with Mary" – 3:45
5. "World's a Mess" – 3:33

=== Side four ===
1. "True Love" – 2:36 (not included on CD release)
2. "White Girl" – 3:40
3. "Skin Deep Town" – 3:16
4. "So Long" (Woody Guthrie) – 4:00
5. "The Call of the Wreckin' Ball" (Dave Alvin, Doe) – 4:35
6. "Year 1" – 1:16
7. "Johny Hit and Run Paulene" – 3:32

== Personnel ==
X

- John Doe – acoustic guitar, bass guitar, vocals
- Exene Cervenka – vocals
- D.J. Bonebrake – drums
- Tony Gilkyson – guitar, vocals

Technical personnel

- Kevin Patrick - executive producer
- Alvin Clark - producer, engineer
- Stanley Johnston - engineer
- Gina Immel - assistant engineer
- Jeff Poe - assistant engineer
- Jay Willis - mastering
- John Kosh - design consultant

== Charts ==
Sales chart performance for Live at the Whiskey a Go-Go
Chart	Position	Date	Duration
Billboard 200	175	May 27, 1988	5 weeks

== See also ==
- Sunset Strip
