= Poor Little Critter on the Road =

Studio album by The Knitters
- Released: 1985
- Recorded: 1984
- Length: 38:14
- Label: Slash
- Producer: Patrick McDonald; John Doe; Billy Zoom

The Knitters chronology
Poor Little Critter on the Road (1985)	The Modern Sounds of the Knitters (2005)

Poor Little Critter on the Road is the debut album from X side project The Knitters, Poor Little Critter on the Road contains original compositions and covers of songs by X as well as established country music performers.

== Music ==
Robert Ham of Paste Magazine said the album's tracks "sound ragged and blissed out, as if they were made by a band at the end of a four-hour, beer-fueled set at a roadside honky tonk."

== Reception ==
Bart Bull of Spin wrote, "Exene and Doe mostly succeed, and Doe mostly triumphs. He's listened long and hard to the masters. Alvin, rattling loose every Sister Rosetta Tharpe lick known to man, woman, or God, is this record's secret hero."

== Track listing ==
All tracks composed by Exene Cervenka and John Doe; except where indicated

1. "Poor Little Critter on the Road" – 1:43
2. "Someone Like You" – 2:40
3. "Walkin' Cane" (Traditional; arranged by The Knitters) – 5:34
4. "Silver Wings" (Merle Haggard) – 2:12
5. "Poor Old Heartsick Me" (Helen Carter) – 2:41
6. "The New World" – 2:53
7. "Cryin' But My Tears Are Far Away" – 3:35
8. "Love Shack" – 3:55
9. "The Call of the Wreckin' Ball" (John Doe, Dave Alvin) – 2:56
10. "Trail of Time" (Alton Delmore) – 3:10
11. "Baby Out of Jail" (Harty Taylor, Karl Davis) – 2:39
12. "Rock Island Line" (Hudie Ledbetter) – 4:16

== Personnel ==
The Knitters

- John Doe – vocals, acoustic guitar
- Dave Alvin – acoustic guitar, electric guitar
- Exene Cervenka – vocals
- D.J. Bonebrake – snare drum
- Jonny Ray Bartel – upright bass
- Martin Lund – accordion
- Billy Zoom – Macaroni box on "Walkin' Cane"

== Tribute album ==
In 1999, Bloodshot Records released "Poor Little Knitter in the Road: A Tribute to the Knitters".
