= Hey Zeus! =

Studio album by X
- Released: June 8, 1993
- Recorded: September–December 1992
- Studios: Zeitgeist Studios, Los Angeles; Groove Masters, Santa Monica; Sunset Sound, Hollywood
- Genre: Alternative rock
- Length: 45:57
- Label: Big Life
- Producer: Tony Berg

X chronology
| Live at the Whisky a Go-Go (1988) | Hey Zeus! (1993) | Unclogged (1995) |

Singles from Hey Zeus!
- 1. "Country at War" Released: 1993; 2. "New Life" Released: 1993

Professional ratings
Review scores
| Source | Rating |
|---|---|
| AllMusic | 2.5/5 stars |
| The Encyclopedia of Popular Music | 2/5 stars |
| Entertainment Weekly | B+ |
| Rolling Stone | 3/5 stars |
| Spin | 0.5/1 star |
| The Village Voice | B− |

Hey Zeus! (stylized as hey Zeus!) is the seventh studio album by American rock band X. The tracks "Country at War" and "New Life" peaked at No. 15 and No. 26, respectively, on the Billboard Modern Rock Tracks chart.

== Track listing ==
All tracks composed by Exene Cervenka and John Doe; except where noted.

| No. | Title | Writer(s) | Length |
|---|---|---|---|
| 1. | "Someone's Watching" | John Doe, Tony Gilkyson | 4:49 |
| 2. | "Big Blue House" | | 4:05 |
| 3. | "Clean Like Tomorrow" | | 3:58 |
| 4. | "New Life" | | 3:24 |
| 5. | "Country at War" | | 4:16 |
| 6. | "Arms for Hostages" | | 3:36 |
| 7. | "Into the Light" | John Doe, Tony Gilkyson | 3:57 |
| 8. | "Lettuce and Vodka" | Duke McVinnie | 5:07 |
| 9. | "Everybody" | | 3:32 |
| 10. | "Baby You Lied" | | 3:18 |
| 11. | "Drawn in the Dark" | | 5:55 |
| Total length: | | | 45:57 |

== Personnel ==
X

- Exene Cervenka – vocals
- John Doe – vocals, bass
- Tony Gilkyson – guitar, vocals
- D.J. Bonebrake – percussion, drums, marimba

with:

- Patrick Warren, Tony Berg - keyboards

Technical personnel

- Tony Berg – producer
- Tchad Blake – engineer, mixing
- Dale Lavi – photographer
- Casey McMackin – engineer
- Brian Schuebie – engineer
