= Breathless (1983 film) =

1983 American drama film directed by Jim McBride

- Theatrical release poster
- Directed by: Jim McBride
- Screenplay by: L. M. Kit Carson; Jim McBride
- Based on: Breathless by Jean-Luc Godard and François Truffaut
- Produced by: Martin Erlichman
- Starring: Richard Gere; Valérie Kaprisky
- Cinematography: Richard H. Kline
- Edited by: Robert Estrin; Rachel Igel
- Music by: Jack Nitzsche
- Distributed by: Orion Pictures
- Release date: May 13, 1983
- Running time: 97 minutes
- Country: United States
- Language: English
- Budget: $7.5 million
- Box office: $19.9 million

Breathless is a 1983 American neo-noir romantic thriller film directed by Jim McBride, written by McBride and L. M. Kit Carson, and starring Richard Gere and Valérie Kaprisky. It is a remake of the 1960 French film of the same name directed by Jean-Luc Godard and written by Godard and François Truffaut. The original film is about an American woman and a French criminal in Paris, while the remake is vice versa in Los Angeles.

== Plot ==
Jesse Lujack is a cocky, hedonistic drifter and small-time car thief in Las Vegas. He’s obsessed with Silver Surfer comic books, the music of Jerry Lee Lewis, and Monica Poiccard, a UCLA architecture student whom he knows only from a weekend fling while she visited Vegas.

Leaving Vegas, Lujack steals a Porsche, intending to drive to Los Angeles. As he speeds down the highway and looks through the owner's possessions, he discovers a handgun in the vehicle's glovebox, which he briefly toys with. He comes upon a highway construction roadblock and evades it. Seeing his reckless driving, a patrolman gives chase and the fleeing Lujack runs off the road and becomes stuck. When the patrolman spotlights Lujack and orders him to step away from the car, he impulsively grabs the gun and blindly shoots through the back window of the car, inadvertently fatally wounding the patrolman. A remorseful Lujack pads the dying patrolman's head with his coat and flees on foot. Arriving in L.A., Lujack finds his picture splashed all over the newspaper and TV news as the "cop killer."

On the run, but unable to immediately leave the city while arranging to get paid for a previous car theft, Lujack breaks into Monica's apartment and waits for her to return home. Monica discovers him naked in her bed and initially declines his advances, but later has sex with him in the shower. Lujack attempts to convince Monica to abscond to Mexico with him, but she is reluctant. Lujack shows up at her campus and intrudes on her presentation of a project to her professors, initially exasperating her. He continues to pursue her, showing up in various stolen cars to offer her rides. Lujack eventually wears down Monica and she succumbs to his charms once again, although still ambivalent to his insistence on leaving for Mexico.

After Lujack's photograph appears in the newspaper, he is recognized on the street after dropping Monica off at a groundbreaking ceremony downtown. The police question Monica but she refuses to turn Lujack in. When the police start following her before Lujack comes back to pick her up, she finally accepts his offer to flee to Mexico together. On the way out of L.A., Lujack and Monica stop in order for Lujack to repair his latest stolen car. She walks to a nearby store and finds her picture in a newspaper alongside Lujack's. Realizing the impossibility of her romantic fantasy, she phones the police, but then returns to tell Lujack she did so. Lujack asks her if she loves him, and she says no. He laughs and says “liar”.

Lujack then runs up the road to meet an accomplice he has arranged to bring his payment for the previous car theft, who throws a gun to him as well, which he refuses and allows to drop to the street. The police corner him in the road where Lujack sings "Breathless" to Monica while dancing around the gun at his feet. The film ends in a freeze-frame of Lujack scooping up the gun and turning to face the police.

== Cast ==
- Richard Gere as Jesse Lujack
- Valérie Kaprisky as Monica Poiccard
- Art Metrano as Birnbaum
- John P. Ryan as Lieutenant Parmental
- Robert Dunn as Sergeant Enright
- Lisa Persky as Salesgirl
- James Hong as Grocer
- Georg Olden as Skateboarding Kid
- Miguel Pinero as Carlito
- Isabel Cooley as Photographer
- Sunny Ade as Sunny

== Soundtrack ==
There is no official soundtrack released. Along with the incidental music for the movie, provided by Jack Nitzsche, these are the songs that are featured in the film:

1. "Bad Boy" – Mink DeVille
2. "High School Confidential" – Jerry Lee Lewis
3. "Breathless" – Jerry Lee Lewis
4. "Final Sunset" – Brian Eno
5. "Wonderful World" – Sam Cooke
6. "Opening" – Philip Glass
7. "No Me Hagas Sufrir" – Ismael Quintana / Eddie Palmieri
8. "Suspicious Minds" – Elvis Presley
9. "Wind on Wind" – Brian Eno
10. "Wind on Water" – Brian Eno and Robert Fripp
11. "Jack the Ripper" – Link Wray
12. "365 Is My Number / The Message" – King Sunny Adé
13. "Celtic Soul Brothers" – Dexy's Midnight Runners
14. "Message of Love" – The Pretenders
15. "Caca de Vaca" – Joe "King" Carrasco
16. "Breathless" – X

== Release ==
It was released in the United States on May 13, 1983, by Orion Pictures. Breathless was screened at the Dallas International Film Festival on April 18, 2015.

=== Home media ===
Breathless was released on VHS in the United States and United Kingdom by Orion Pictures and Rank with a LaserDisc available in 1983. It debuted on DVD in the U.S. in April 2000 by Metro-Goldwyn-Mayer with the theatrical trailer and booklet. In the U.S. and Canada, Shout Factory released the film in April 2015 on Blu-ray with one extra feature, a theatrical trailer.

== Reception ==
=== Box office ===
The film grossed $19,910,002 in the United States.

=== Critical response ===
Upon release, it received mixed reviews. On Rotten Tomatoes it has an approval rating of 61% based on reviews from 18 critics. On Metacritic it has a score of 52% based on reviews from 13 critics, indicating "mixed or average" reviews. Audiences polled by CinemaScore gave the film an average grade of "C" on an A+ to F scale.

Roger Ebert's contemporary review was a mixed 2.5 stars out of 4. He felt the film's mix of art-house and noir styles would not appeal to "average audiences" and believed Kaprisky was miscast and often seemed "lost", but praised Gere's performance: "I thought Gere was deliberately repugnant, but in an interesting way".

American director Quentin Tarantino cited it as one of the "coolest" movies, commenting: "Here's a movie that indulges completely all my obsessions—comic books, rockabilly music and movies."

British critic Mark Kermode is a fan of the film, and prefers it to the French original.

== See also ==
- Breathless (1960 film)
- List of American films of 1983
