= Wild Gift =

Studio album by X
- Released: May 6, 1981
- Recorded: March 1981
- Studios: Clover Recorders, Los Angeles, Golden Sound Studios, Hollywood
- Genre: Punk rock
- Length: 32:49 (Original LP); 49:58 (2001 CD reissue)
- Label: Slash
- Producer: Ray Manzarek

X chronology
| Los Angeles (1980) | Wild Gift (1981) | Under the Big Black Sun (1982) |

Singles from Wild Gift
- 1. "White Girl" Released: 1980

Wild Gift is the second studio album by American rock band X, released on May 6, 1981, by Slash Records. It was very well received critically, and was voted the year's second best album in The Village Voice's Pazz & Jop poll. Wild Gift was later ranked at number 334 on Rolling Stone magazine's list of the 500 greatest albums of all time.

Wild Gift showcases the band's unique punk rock style, which infuses roots rock, country, blues, R&B, and rockabilly.

In 1988, Slash issued Los Angeles and Wild Gift jointly on a single compact disc. Wild Gift was remastered and reissued in 2001 by Rhino Records, with seven bonus tracks.

The track "White Girl" was sampled by the Red Hot Chili Peppers on their 1989 album Mother's Milk, in the song "Good Time Boys". The Chili Peppers song's lyrics mentioned X's John Doe specifically, "whose voice is made of gold".

== Critical reception ==
Professional ratings
Review scores
| Source | Rating |
|---|---|
| AllMusic | 5/5 stars |
| Christgau's Record Guide | A+ |
| Entertainment Weekly | A |
| Record Mirror | 5/5 stars |
| Rolling Stone | 4.5/5 stars |
| The Rolling Stone Album Guide | 5/5 stars |
| Spin Alternative Record Guide | 10/10 |

Trouser Press wrote that "Zoom's ingeniously simple guitar transcends its influences, and the Doe/Exene harmonies attain a knifelike sharpness." In The Village Voice's Pazz & Jop critics' poll for 1981, Wild Gift was ranked at number two, behind Sandinista! by the Clash.

In Christgau's Record Guide: The '80s (1990), critic Robert Christgau lauded Wild Gift, writing:

Hippies couldn't understand jealousy because they believed in universal love; punks can't understand it because they believe sex is a doomed reflex of existentially discrete monads. As X-Catholics obsessed with a guilt they can't accept and committed to a subculture that gives them no peace, Exene and John Doe are prey to both misconceptions, and their struggle with them is thrilling and edifying ... Who knows whether the insightful ministrations of their guitarist will prove as therapeutic for them as for you and me, but I say trust a bohemian bearing gifts. How often do we get a great love album and a great punk album in the same package?

Christgau later ranked Wild Gift third on his "Personal Best" list for the 1980s, the highest placing of any rock album. Wild Gift was ranked at number 334 on the 2003 edition of Rolling Stone's list of "The 500 Greatest Albums of All Time", subsequently rising to rank 333 in the 2012 edition.

== Track listing ==
All tracks written by John Doe and Exene Cervenka.

=== Side one ===
| No. | Title | Length |
|---|---|---|
| 1. | "The Once Over Twice" | 2:31 |
| 2. | "We're Desperate" | 2:00 |
| 3. | "Adult Books" | 3:19 |
| 4. | "Universal Corner" | 4:33 |
| 5. | "I'm Coming Over" | 1:14 |
| 6. | "It's Who You Know" | 2:17 |
| Total length: | | 15:54 |

=== Side two ===
| No. | Title | Length |
|---|---|---|
| 1. | "In This House That I Call Home" | 3:34 |
| 2. | "Some Other Time" | 2:17 |
| 3. | "White Girl" | 3:27 |
| 4. | "Beyond and Back" | 2:49 |
| 5. | "Back 2 the Base" | 1:33 |
| 6. | "When Our Love Passed Out on the Couch" | 1:57 |
| 7. | "Year 1" | 1:18 |
| Total length: | | 16:55 32:49 |

=== Bonus tracks (2001 CD reissue) ===
| No. | Title | Writer(s) | Length |
|---|---|---|---|
| 1. | "Beyond and Back" (Live) | | 2:48 |
| 2. | "Blue Spark" (Demo) | | 2:04 |
| 3. | "We're Desperate" (Single version) | | 2:01 |
| 4. | "Back 2 the Base" (Live) | | 1:40 |
| 5. | "Heater" (Rehearsal) | John Doe | 2:32 |
| 6. | "White Girl" (Single Mix) | | 3:29 |
| 7. | "The Once Over Twice" (Unissued Single Mix) | | 2:35 |
| Total length: | | | 17:09 49:58 |

== Personnel ==
X

- John Doe – bass, vocals
- Exene – vocals
- Billy Zoom – guitar
- D.J. Bonebrake – drums

== Charts ==
Sales chart performance for Wild Gift
| Chart | Position | Date | Duration |
|---|---|---|---|
| Billboard 200 | 165 | June 28, 1981 | 5 weeks |
