= X (American band) =

American punk rock band

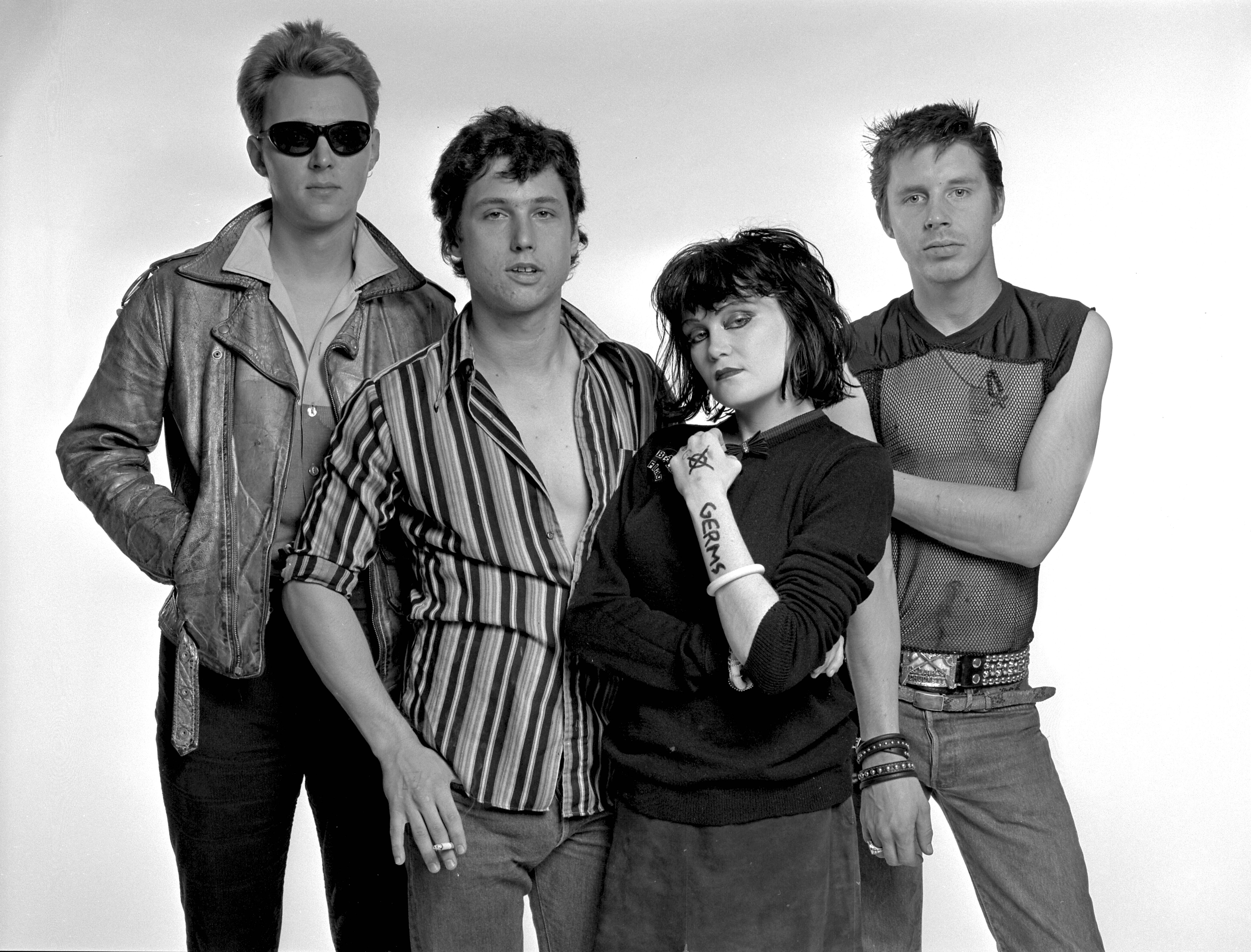
- Billy Zoom, D.J. Bonebrake, Exene Cervenka, John Doe, 1979

Background information
- Origin: Los Angeles, California, U.S.
- Genres: Punk rock; alternative rock
- Years active: 1977–2025
- Labels: Dangerhouse; Slash; Elektra; Big Life; Infidelity; Fat Possum
- Spinoffs: The Knitters
- Past members: Dave Alvin; Tony Gilkyson; D. J. Bonebrake; Exene Cervenka; John Doe; Billy Zoom
- Website: xtheband.com

X is an American punk rock band formed in Los Angeles. The original members were vocalist Exene Cervenka, vocalist-bassist John Doe, guitarist Billy Zoom and drummer D. J. Bonebrake. The band released seven studio albums from 1980 to 1993. After a period of inactivity during the mid-to-late 1990s, X reunited in the early 2000s and continued to tour. In June 2024, X announced a final album and farewell tour, but went on to clarify that they would still perform live together as a group, albeit not in a "touring" capacity.

X achieved limited mainstream success but influenced various genres of music, including punk rock, Americana, and folk rock. In 1991, Music critic Robert Hilburn identified them as one of the most influential bands of their era. In 2003, X's first two studio albums, Los Angeles and Wild Gift, were ranked by Rolling Stone as being among the 500 greatest albums of all time. Los Angeles was ranked 91st on Pitchfork's Top 100 Albums of the 1980s.

== History ==
=== 1977–1979: Formation and Dangerhouse era ===
X was founded by bassist-singer Doe and guitarist Zoom after responding to each others advertisements that they had placed in The Recycler, a local magazine. Doe brought his poetry-writing girlfriend Cervenka to band practices, and she eventually joined the band as a vocalist. Drummer Bonebrake was the last of the original members to join after leaving local group the Eyes; he also filled in on drums for Germs.

X's first record deal was with independent label Dangerhouse, for which the band produced one single, "Adult Books"/"We're Desperate" (1978). A Dangerhouse session version of "Los Angeles" was also featured on a 1979 Dangerhouse 12-inch EP compilation called Yes L.A. (a play on the no-wave compilation No New York), a six-song picture disc that also featured five other early L.A. punk bands: the Eyes, the Germs, the Bags, the Alley Cats, and Black Randy and the Metrosquad.

=== 1980–1981: Los Angeles and Wild Gift ===
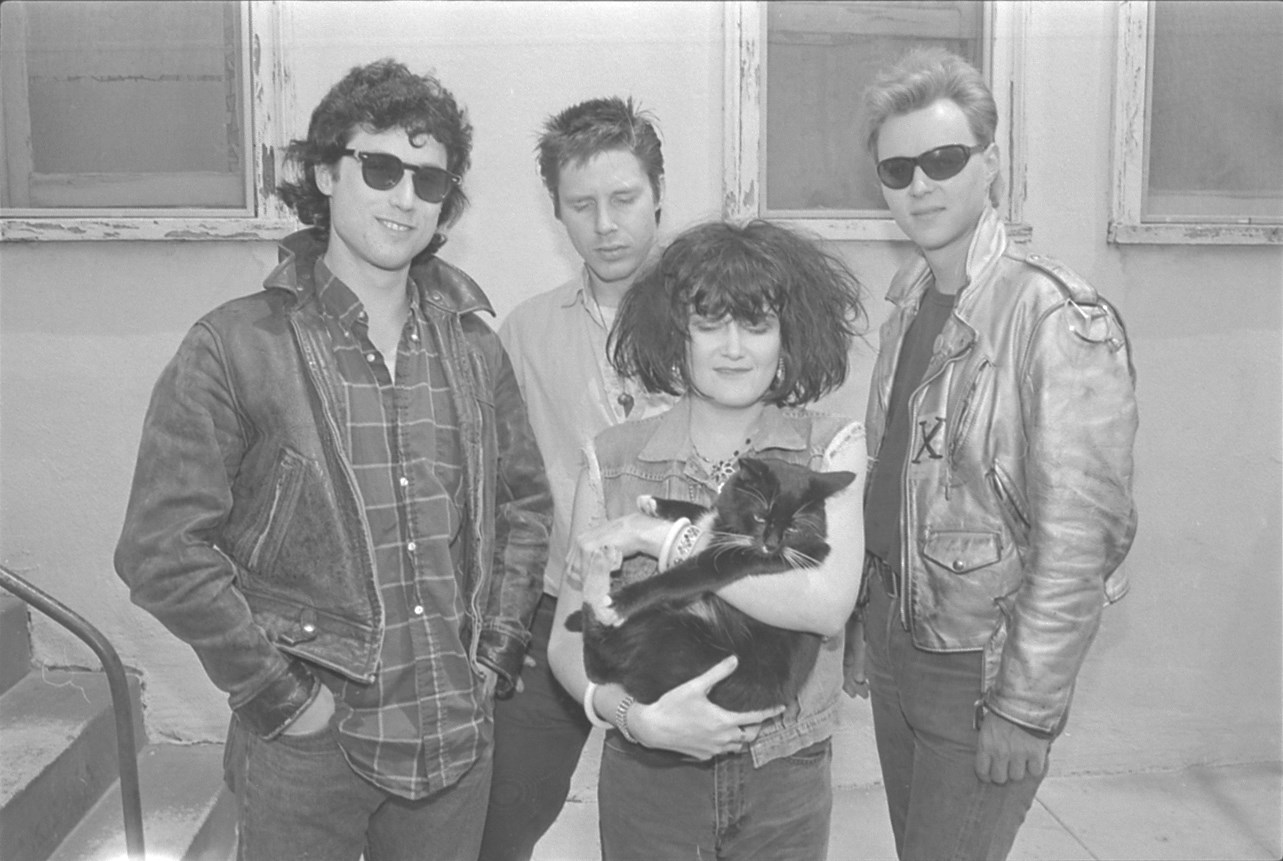
X in 1980

As the band became the flag bearer for the local scene, a larger independent label, Slash Records, signed them. The result was their debut album, Los Angeles (1980), which was produced by the Doors' former keyboard player Ray Manzarek. It sold well by the standards of independent labels. Much of X's early material had a rockabilly edge. Doe and Cervenka co-wrote most of the group's songs and their slightly off-kilter harmony vocals served as the group's most distinctive element. Their lyrics tended to be straight-out poetry; comparisons to Charles Bukowski and Raymond Chandler were made from the start.

Their follow-up effort, Wild Gift (1981), was similar in musical style. It featured shorter, faster songs and is arguably their most stereotypically punk-sounding record.

During 1981, both Doe and Bonebrake (along with Dave Alvin, guitarist of the Blasters) served as members of the Flesh Eaters, performing on that band's second album, A Minute to Pray, a Second to Die.

=== 1982–1984: Elektra era and the Knitters ===
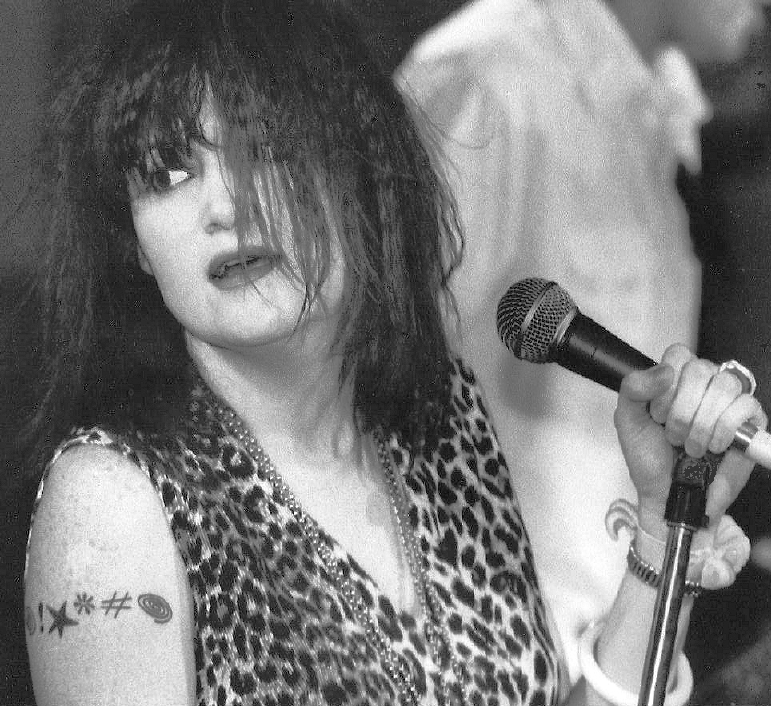
Exene Cervenka at Chestnut Cabaret, Philadelphia, summer 1986

X signed with major label Elektra in 1982 and released their third studio album, Under the Big Black Sun, which marked a departure from their trademark sound. While still fast and loud, with raw punk guitars, it displayed evolving country leanings. The album was influenced by the death of Cervenka's elder sister Mirielle in a 1980 car accident. Three of its songs ("Riding with Mary", "Come Back to Me" and the title track) directly relate to the tragedy. A fourth, a high-speed version of Al Dubin and Joe Burke's "Dancing with Tears in My Eyes", was, years later, indirectly attributed to Cervenka's mournful state of mind. The stark black-and-white cover art and title were also a reflection of the somber mood of the band during this time. Cervenka has said it is her favorite X album.

In 1983, the band slightly redefined their sound with the release of the album More Fun in the New World, making X somewhat more polished, eclectic and radio-ready than on previous albums. With the sound moving away from punk rock, the band's rockabilly influence became even more noticeable, along with some new elements: funk on the track "True Love Pt. II", and Woody Guthrie-influenced folk protest songs like "The New World" and "I Must Not Think Bad Thoughts". The record received critical praise from Rolling Stone and Playboy, which had long been stalwart supporters of X and their sound.

The Knitters, a side project, were composed of X minus Zoom, plus Alvin on guitar and Johnny Ray Bartel (of the Red Devils) on double bass, and released the Poor Little Critter on the Road album in 1985. The Knitters were devoted to folk and country music; music critic Denise Sullivan said their take on Merle Haggard's "Silver Wings" "may be the definitive version".

The band's music was featured in three movie soundtracks during this period. "Los Angeles" and "Beyond and Back" were used in Wim Wenders' The State of Things (1982). "Breathless" was used in the Richard Gere remake of Jean-Luc Godard's Breathless (1983).

=== 1985–1987: Commercial era and departure of Zoom ===
Despite the overwhelmingly positive critical reception for their first four albums, the band was frustrated by its lack of wider mainstream success. Zoom had also said that he would leave the band unless its next album was more successful. The band decided to change producers in search of a more accessible sound. Their fifth record, Ain't Love Grand!, was produced by pop metal producer Michael Wagener. It featured a drastic change in sound, especially in the polished and layered production, while the band's punk roots were little in evidence, replaced by a countrified version of hard rock. The change in production was intended to bring the band more chart success, but although it received more mainstream radio play than their earlier releases, it did not represent a commercial breakthrough. "Burning House of Love", the album's first single, was a minor hit on the Billboard Top Rock Tracks chart, where it peaked at number 27 in September 1985. Zoom left the group shortly thereafter in 1986, the same year in which the feature-length documentary film, X: The Unheard Music, was released.

Zoom was initially replaced by Alvin, who had left the Blasters. The band then added a fifth member, guitarist Tony Gilkyson, formerly of the band Lone Justice. By the time the band released its sixth album, See How We Are, Alvin had already left the band, although he played on the record along with Gilkyson and wrote "4th of July" for the band. Like Ain't Love Grand, the album's sound was far removed from the band's punk origins, yet featured a punchy, energetic, hard-rocking roots rock sound that in many ways represented a more natural progression from their earlier sound than the previous album had. After touring for the album, X released a live album of the tour, titled Live at the Whisky a Go-Go, and then went on an extended hiatus.

Back in 1984, X had released a cover version of "Wild Thing" as a non-album single. In 1989, the song was re-released as the lead single from the soundtrack to the hit film Major League. It later became a staple at sporting events, particularly baseball games, and was used by Japanese professional wrestler Atsushi Onita after he founded Frontier Martial-Arts Wrestling in 1989. The song is now used as Jon Moxley's entrance music in All Elite Wrestling.

=== 1993–1995: First reunion, Hey Zeus! and Unclogged ===
X regrouped in the early 1990s to record their seventh studio album, Hey Zeus!, released in 1993 on the Big Life label. The album marked somewhat of a retreat from the increasingly roots rock direction that the band's past few records had gone in, instead featuring an eclectic alternative rock sound that fit in well with the then-current musical climate. Despite this, it failed to become a hit, although two of its songs, "Country at War" and "New Life," peaked at numbers 15 and 26 on the Billboard Modern Rock charts, respectively.

In 1994, they contributed a cover of the Richard Thompson song "Shoot Out the Lights" to a Thompson tribute album called Beat the Retreat, which featured David Hidalgo of Los Lobos on electric guitar. On the same album, Doe sang harmony and played bass and Bonebrake played drums on Bob Mould's cover of "Turning of the Tide," and Bonebrake played drums on the title track, which was performed by the British folk artist June Tabor.

The band released an acoustic live album, Unclogged, in 1995 on Infidelity Records.

=== 1997–2004: Hiatus and second reunion ===
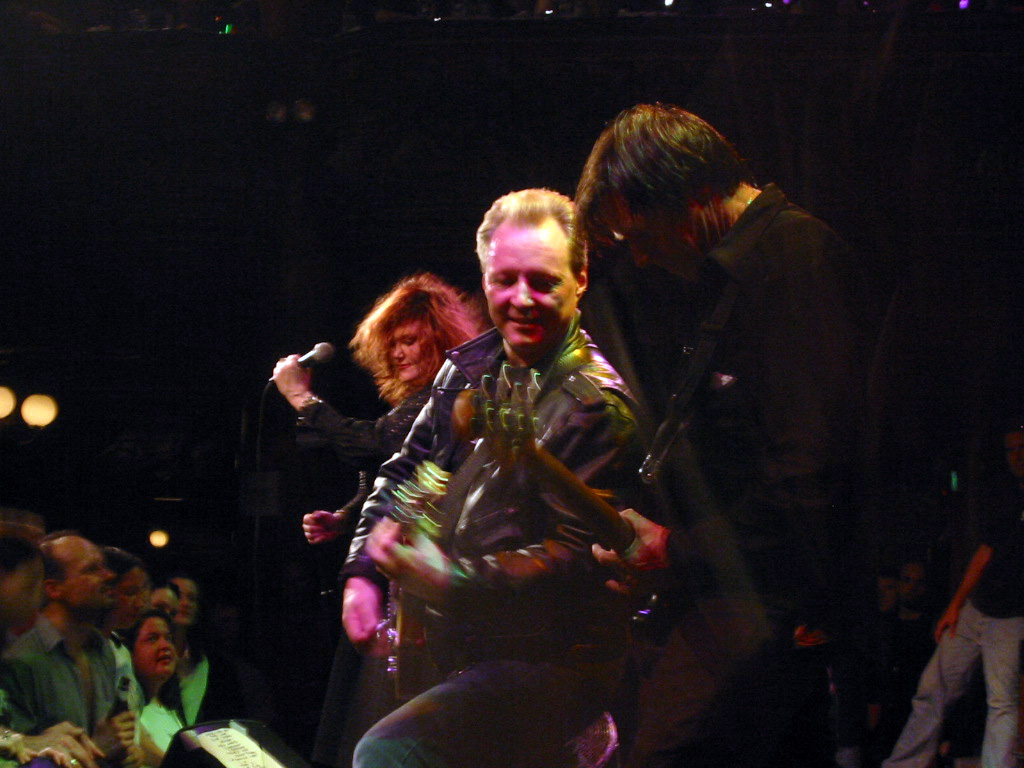
X in performance at the Great American Music Hall in San Francisco, 2004, from left to right: Cervenka, Zoom, and Doe

In 1997, X released a compilation called Beyond and Back: The X Anthology, which focused heavily on the early years with Zoom and included a number of previously unreleased versions of songs that had appeared on their previous albums. At the same time, they also announced that they were disbanding. However, they did a farewell tour to promote the compilation in 1998, with Zoom returning on guitar. The original lineup also returned to the studio for the final time, with Manzarek reprising his role as producer, to record a cover of the Doors' "The Crystal Ship" for the soundtrack for The X-Files: Fight the Future.

X: The Unheard Music was released on DVD in 2005, as was the concert DVD X – Live in Los Angeles, which commemorated the 25th anniversary of the band's landmark debut album, Los Angeles.

=== 2005–2007: Reunion of the Knitters ===
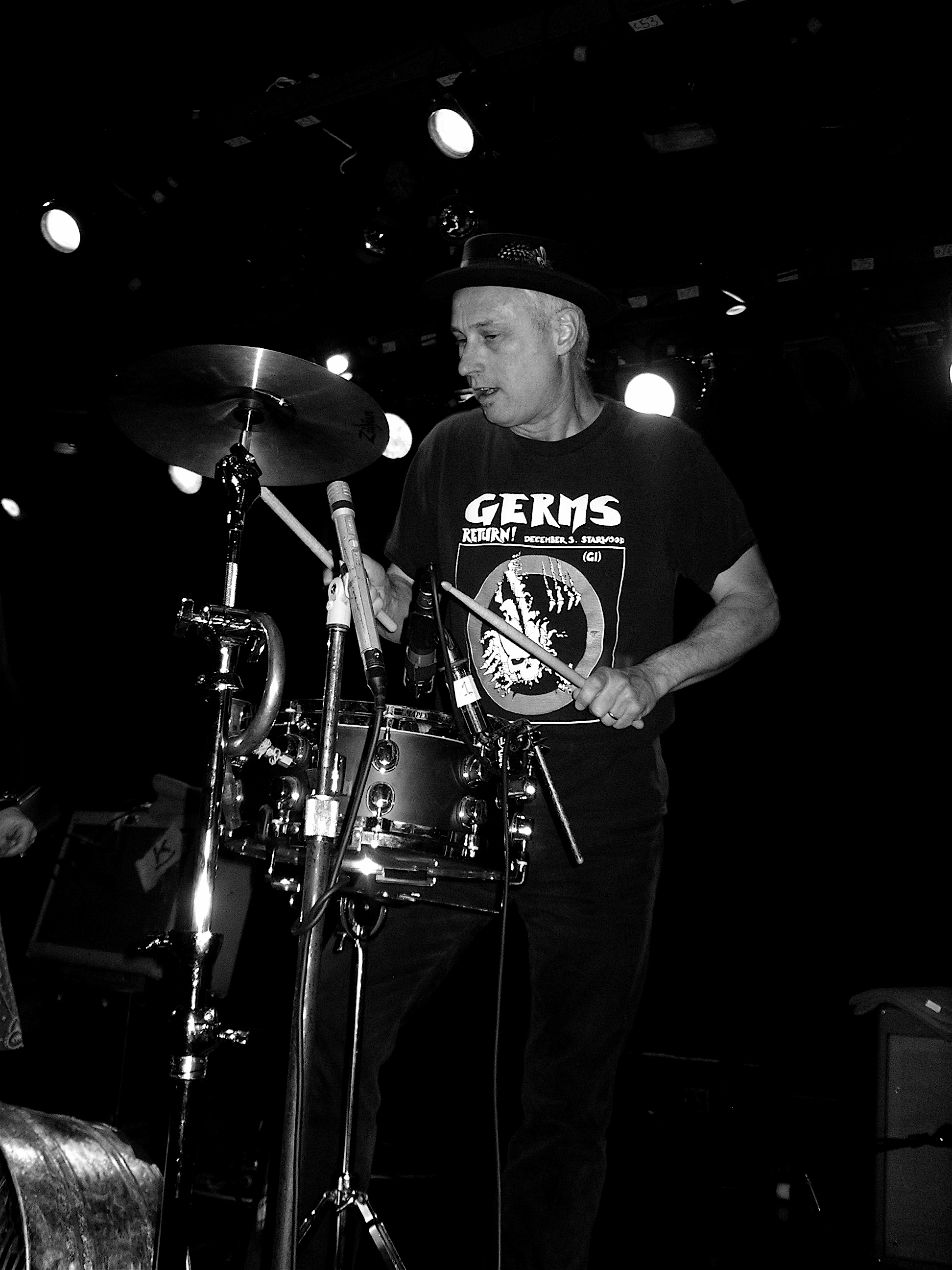
Drummer D. J. Bonebrake in 2007 with the Knitters

In 2005, Doe, Cervenka and Bonebrake reunited with Alvin and Bartel to release a second Knitters album, 20 years after the first, titled The Modern Sounds of the Knitters. In summer 2006, X toured North America on the "As the World Burns" tour with the Rollins Band and the Riverboat Gamblers. In the spring of 2008, the band, with all original members, embarked on their "13X31" tour with Skybombers and the Detroit Cobras. "13X31" was a reference to their 31st anniversary.

=== 2008–present: Touring and first album in 27 years ===
From 2004 onward, X have continued to perform frequently around North America.

X appeared at the 2008 SXSW Festival (with footage of their performance made viewable on Crackle); the Coachella Valley Music and Arts Festival on April 19, 2009; and the All Tomorrow's Parties festival in Minehead, England from May 15–17, 2009. They were invited to perform at the latter by the festival's curators, the Breeders.

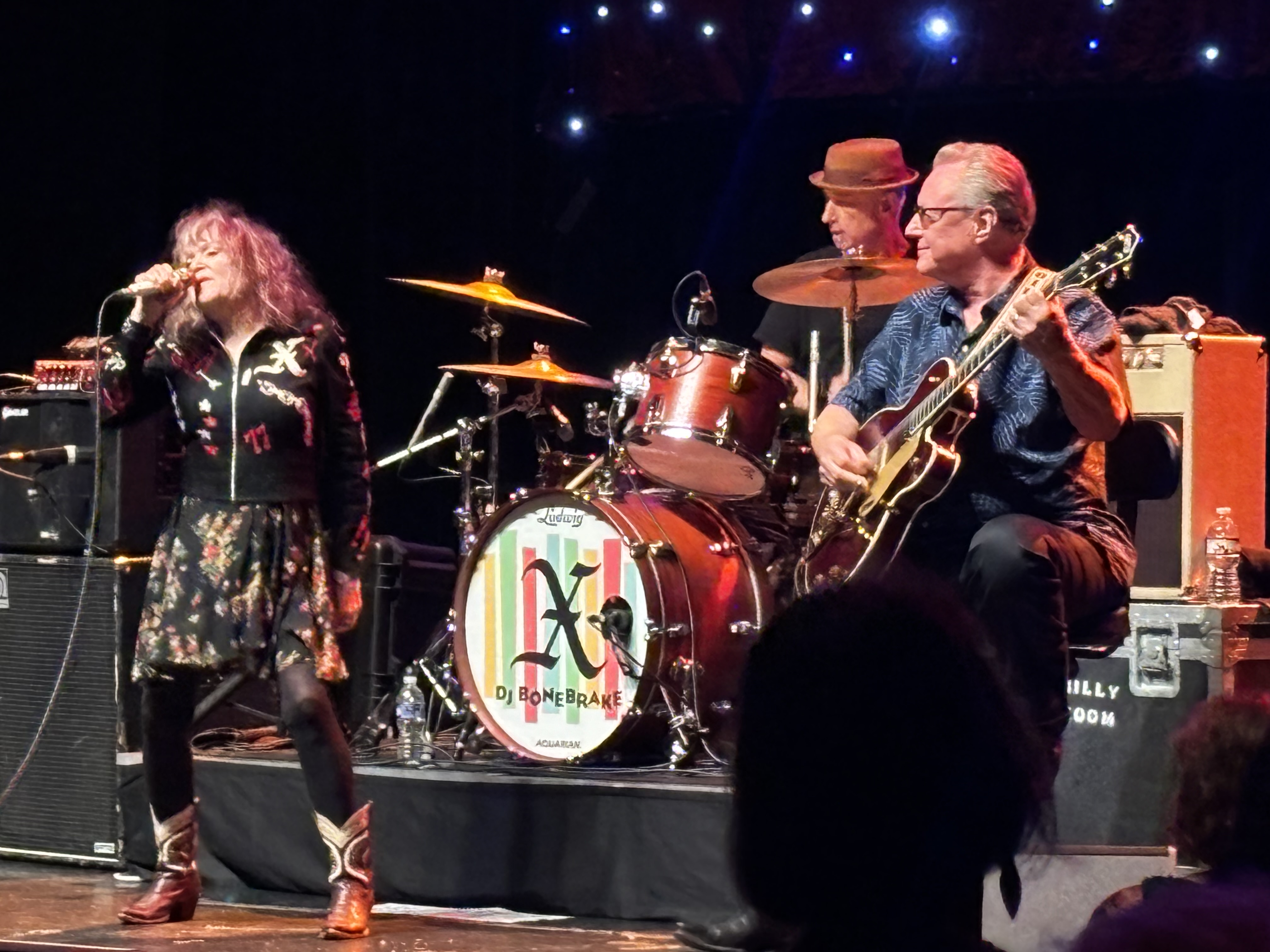
X performs on October 1, 2024 at Keswick Theatre outside of Philadelphia.

In June 2009, the band publicly announced that Cervenka had been diagnosed with multiple sclerosis. However, she told the Orange County Register in 2011 that the doctor who originally diagnosed the disease believes he misdiagnosed her. Cervenka stated, "I've had so many doctors tell me I have MS, then some say I don't ... I don't even care anymore".

In June 2010, X played a free show at the North by Northeast festival in Toronto, Ontario, Canada and headlined the third annual Roadshow Revival, a Johnny Cash tribute festival in Ventura, California. X performed at The Voodoo Experience 2011, held at City Park in New Orleans, Louisiana, on October 28–30, 2011. The band also opened for Pearl Jam on their 2011 South and Central American tour in November and their European tour in June and July 2012. On September 2, 2012, X performed at the Budweiser Made in America Festival in Philadelphia, Pennsylvania.

In July 2015, Zoom took a performing break to undergo treatment for bladder cancer, returning in November 2015.

On March 4, 2016, X appeared on the episode "Show Me a Hero" of Adult Swim show Childrens Hospital. On October 13, 2017, the Grammy Museum at L.A. Live opened a new exhibit titled "X: 40 Years of Punk in Los Angeles", to run through February 25, 2018.

In 2017, Cervenka announced that X had added Craig Packham of The Palominos to fill in on drums and rhythm guitar, because Bonebrake and Zoom were now playing vibes and saxophone, respectively.

In 2018, the band released X – Live in Latin America via a Kickstarter campaign, to coincide with their 40th anniversary. The album was recorded during a 2011 tour where X was the opening band for Pearl Jam. Pearl Jam's sound engineer made the recordings, and presented them to X at the end of the tour. The album was produced by Rob Schnapf, and featured the four original members of X.

In early 2019 Fat Possum Records released two new X songs as a single, followed by the "genuinely good" (per BrooklynVegan) new album Alphabetland on April 22, 2020. On February 9, 2021, Fat Possum released Xtras: two more tracks from the same recording sessions, one being an alternate version. Robby Krieger, of the Doors, played slide guitar on one track each of Alphabetland and of Xtras.

In June 2024, John Doe announced on Facebook that a new X album Smoke & Fiction would be released on August 2, 2024, by Fat Possum Records. A subsequent announcement stated that this would be X's final album. The album reflects on the band's early history and the broader world events of those years. The release was accompanied by an extensive US farewell tour starting July 6, 2024.

== Band members ==
=== Classic lineup ===
- John Doe – bass, lead vocals (1977–2025)
- Exene Cervenka – lead vocals (1977–2025)
- Billy Zoom – guitars, saxophone (1977–1986, 1999–2025)
- D.J. Bonebrake – drums, vibes (1977–2025)

=== Other members ===
- Dave Alvin – guitar, six-string bass (1986–1987)
- Tony Gilkyson – guitar (1986–1998)

=== Touring musicians ===
- Craig Packham – drums, guitars (2017–2025)

== Discography ==
=== Studio albums ===
Year	Title	US 200	UK Ind
1980	Los Angeles	—	14
1981	Wild Gift	165	—
1982	Under the Big Black Sun	76	—
1983	More Fun in the New World	86	—
1985	Ain't Love Grand!	89	—
1987	See How We Are	107	—
1993	Hey Zeus!	—	—
2020	Alphabetland	—	—
2024	Smoke & Fiction	—	49

=== Singles ===
Year	Title	Peak chart positions		Album
Year	Title	US Main	US Mod	Album
1978	"Adult Books"	—	—	non-album single
1980	"Los Angeles"	—	—	Los Angeles
1980	"White Girl"	—	—	Wild Gift
1982	"Blue Spark"	—	—	Under the Big Black Sun
1982	"Motel Room in My Bed"	—	—	Under the Big Black Sun
1983	"The New World"	—	—	More Fun in the New World
1983	"True Love, Part 2"	—	—	More Fun in the New World
1984	"Wild Thing"	—	—	non-album single
1985	"Burning House of Love"	27	—	Ain't Love Grand!
1987	"4th of July"	—	—	See How We Are
1987	"See How We Are"	—	—	See How We Are
1993	"Country at War"	—	15	Hey Zeus!
1993	"New Life"	—	26	Hey Zeus!
1994	"Shoot Out the Lights"	—	—	Beat the Retreat: Songs by Richard Thompson
2019	"Delta 88 Nightmare" / "Cyrano Deberger's Back"	—	—	Alphabetland
2021	Xtras: "True Love, Pt. 3" / "Strange Life" (alternate version)	—	—	non-album digital-only single
2024	"Big Black X"	—	—	Smoke & Fiction
2024	"Ruby Church"	—	—	Smoke & Fiction
"—" denotes releases that did not chart or were not released in that region.

=== EPs ===
- 2009 – Merry Xmas from X

=== Live albums ===
- 1988 – Live at the Whisky a Go-Go
- 1995 – Unclogged
- 2005 – X – Live in Los Angeles No. 175 US Billboard Top 200
- 2018 – X – Live in Latin America (Kickstarter special album)

=== Compilations ===
- 1997 – Beyond and Back: The X Anthology
- 2004 – The Best: Make the Music Go Bang!

=== Compilation appearances ===
- We're Desperate: The L.A. Scene (1976-79) (Rhino) (1993) - "We're Desperate", "Los Angeles"

== Filmography ==
- 1981 – The Decline of Western Civilization
- 1981 – Urgh! A Music War
- 1986 – X: The Unheard Music
- 2003 – Mayor of the Sunset Strip
- 2005 – X – Live in Los Angeles
- 2016 – Childrens Hospital
