= Bart Bull =

American journalist

- Born: Seattle, Washington, U.S.
- Occupations: Writer; journalist
- Spouse: Michelle Shocked (1992–2004)

Bart Bull is an American writer, reporter, author, columnist, and critic.

== Background ==
Born in Seattle, Washington, Bull grew up in Phoenix, Arizona. He dropped out of high school to write a novel, and then returned briefly, leaving again without graduating.

Bull was the editor of Sounds, a free monthly Phoenix-based music newspaper, in the mid-1970s, West Coast Editor of Spin from 1985 to 1988, West Coast editor of Vogue, West Coast editor and a founder of Details. He co-founded Browbeat, first American xerox-punk fanzine, with David Wiley in early summer 1977. He managed The Consumers (1977), an obscure but increasingly acclaimed early American punk band from Phoenix, Arizona. He has written for publications including The Washington Post, Arizona Republic, The New York Times, Harper's Bazaar, The Village Voice, The Face, and GQ.

From the earliest days of his work, Bull chronicled subcultures, with pioneering reporting on skateboarding, cockfighting, lowriders, punk, cowboy and rodeo culture, hiphop, heavy metal and others. His reporting on what he called "mall culture," led to writing about architecture, urban life and design in North America, Europe and Australia, often including a critique of modern practices, urban development, and monoculture. One of the earliest writers on punk and hiphop, throughout his reporting career, he has covered issues that would typically be considered "metro desk" stories, while presenting them in a manner more typical of magazine feature writing. His crime reporting has explored bank robbery, drug-dealing, murders, rape, patricide, and politics, ranging from national political conventions to local machinations.

A list of the individuals Bull has profiled include Muddy Waters, John Lee Hooker, Al Green, Buck Owens, James Stewart, Walter Matthau, Ian Dury, David Lynch, Bruce Springsteen, Bill Graham, Tracey Ullman, Tobe Hooper, Buckminster Fuller, Tom Waits, William S. Burroughs, Sun Ra, Prince, Clifton Chenier, Ofra Haza, Steve Miller, Jackson Browne, John Fogerty, Steve Martin, President Gerald Ford, Elvis Costello, Richard Farnsworth, Dwight Yoakam, Joe Ely, Joan Baez, Peter Tosh, Laura Dern, Jeff Beck, Frank Zappa, Michael Jackson, Ed "Big Daddy" Roth, Allen Ginsberg, Amiri Baraka, former Arizona Governor Evan Mecham, Carlos Santana, and Patti Smith. He edited and introduced Clarence "Gatemouth" Brown's memoir, All About Me, working to preserve the visionary musician's self-created spellings and syntax.
