= Los Angeles (X album) =

Studio album by X
- Released: April 26, 1980
- Recorded: January 1980
- Studios: Golden Sound, Hollywood, Los Angeles
- Genre: Punk rock
- Length: 28:05
- Label: Slash
- Producer: Ray Manzarek

X chronology
Los Angeles (1980)	Wild Gift (1981)

Singles from Los Angeles
- 1. "Los Angeles" Released: 1980

Los Angeles is the debut studio album by the American rock band X, released on April 26, 1980, by Slash Records. It was produced by ex-Doors keyboardist Ray Manzarek and includes a cover of the 1967 Doors song "Soul Kitchen".

Los Angeles placed at No. 16 in The Village Voice's 1980 Pazz & Jop critics' poll. In 2003, the album was ranked No. 286 on Rolling Stone's list of the 500 greatest albums of all time.

In 1988, Slash issued Los Angeles and X's second studio album, Wild Gift, jointly on a single CD. It was reissued by Rhino Records in 2001 with five bonus tracks.

== Critical reception ==
Professional ratings
Review scores
Source	Rating
AllMusic	5/5 stars
Christgau's Record Guide	A−
Entertainment Weekly	A
Pitchfork	8.5/10
The Rolling Stone Album Guide	4.5/5 stars
Spin Alternative Record Guide	9/10
Uncut	4.5/5 stars

Los Angeles was reviewed very positively from its first release. Ken Tucker wrote in Rolling Stone that it "is a powerful, upsetting work that concludes with a confrontation of the band's own rampaging bitterness and confusion." Robert Christgau of The Village Voice wrote that their outlook and songs "make a smart argument for a desperately stupid scene." AllMusic's retrospective review concluded that the album "is considered by many to be one of punk's all-time finest recordings, and with good reason."

For the year of its release, Los Angeles placed at No. 16 on the Christgau-organized Village Voice Pazz & Jop critics' poll. Los Angeles Times critic Robert Hilburn named it one of the ten best albums released between 1977 and 1987. Subsequently, Los Angeles was ranked No. 24 on Rolling Stone's 1989 list of the 100 best albums of the 1980s, and Pitchfork ranked it 91st on its 2002 list of the decade's top 100 albums. The former also ranked it No. 286 on its list of the 500 greatest albums of all time in 2003, dropping it to No. 287 in the 2012 update of the list, and to No. 320 in the 2020 update. In 2012, Slant Magazine placed Los Angeles at No. 98 on its list of the 100 best albums of the 1980s. The title track was included in the Rock and Roll Hall of Fame's list of "500 Songs That Shaped Rock and Roll".

== In pop culture ==
- The album's title track was featured in the series finale of The Shield.
- "Los Angeles" is mentioned at the very end of Bret Easton Ellis's debut novel, Less than Zero.
- "Nausea" was performed in the 1981 rockumentary The Decline of Western Civilization, and later in 2008 in the Germs biopic film What We Do Is Secret.
- In 2003, the HBO television series Six Feet Under features main character Nate dancing to "Los Angeles" with his baby daughter in the episode titled "Everyone Leaves". He describes the song as "music that doesn't suck".

== Track listing ==
All tracks are written by John Doe and Exene Cervenka except where noted.

Side A
No.	Title	Writer(s)	Length
1.	"Your Phone's Off the Hook, But You're Not"		2:25
2.	"Johny Hit and Run Paulene"		2:50
3.	"Soul Kitchen"	John Densmore, Robbie Krieger, Ray Manzarek, Jim Morrison	2:25
4.	"Nausea"		3:40
5.	"Sugarlight"		2:28
Total length:			13:48

Side B
No.	Title	Length
6.	"Los Angeles"	2:25
7.	"Sex and Dying in High Society"	2:15
8.	"The Unheard Music"	4:49
9.	"The World's a Mess: It's in My Kiss"	4:43
Total length:		14:12

2001 reissue bonus tracks
No.	Title	Length
10.	"I'm Coming Over" (Demo Version)	1:24
11.	"Adult Books" (Dangerhouse" Rough Mix Version)	3:21
12.	"Delta 88" (Demo Version)	1:28
13.	"Cyrano de Berger's Back" (Rehearsal)	3:01
14.	"Los Angeles" (Dangerhouse Version)	2:14
Total length:		11:28 39:28

2019 reissue digital bonus tracks
No.	Title	Length
10.	"Soul Kitchen (Live)" (Live)	2:35
11.	"Sugarlight (Live)" (Live)	2:43
12.	"Your Phone's Off the Hook, But You're Not (Live)" (Live)	2:38
Total length:		7:16 36:00

== Personnel ==
X

- John Doe – bass, lead vocals
- Exene – vocals
- Billy Zoom – guitar
- D. J. Bonebrake – drums

Additional personnel

- Ray Manzarek – organ on "Nausea", "The Unheard Music" and "The World's a Mess; It's in My Kiss"; synthesizer on "Sex and Dying in High Society"; production
