= Breathless (Jerry Lee Lewis song) =

Single by Jerry Lee Lewis
- B-side: "Down the Line"
- Released: February 1958
- Genre: Rockabilly
- Length: 2:39
- Label: Sun 288
- Songwriter(s): Otis Blackwell

Jerry Lee Lewis singles chronology
"You Win Again" (1957)	"Breathless" (1958)	"Down the Line" (1958)

"Breathless" is a song composed by Otis Blackwell. It was the fourth record by Jerry Lee Lewis, whose version was released in February 1958 on Sun Records. It spent 15 weeks on the Billboard Hot 100 chart, peaking at #7 in April 1958. The song also reached #4 on the country chart, #3 on the R&B chart, and #8 in the UK. The B-side, "Down the Line", also charted in 1958, reaching #51 on the Billboard pop singles chart. It was re-released in 1979 as part of the Sun Records Golden Treasure Series as Sun #25 and on the Quality label in Canada in 1958. The song was also featured in the 1983 film Breathless starring Richard Gere and Valerie Kaprisky along with the Jerry Lee Lewis song "High School Confidential".

== Background ==
The song was recorded in January 1958 at the Sun Records studio at 706 Union in Memphis, Tennessee. The personnel on the session were Jerry Lee Lewis on vocals and piano, Billy Lee Riley on guitar, J.W. Brown on bass, and Jimmy Van Eaton on drums.

== Other recordings ==
The song has been covered several times, including versions by Tom Jones, Mickey Gilley, Wanda Jackson, X, Cliff Richard, Albert Lee, Mike Berry, Hal Munro, The Paramounts, Chas & Dave, and Otis Blackwell.
