= Billy Zoom =

American guitarist (born 1948)

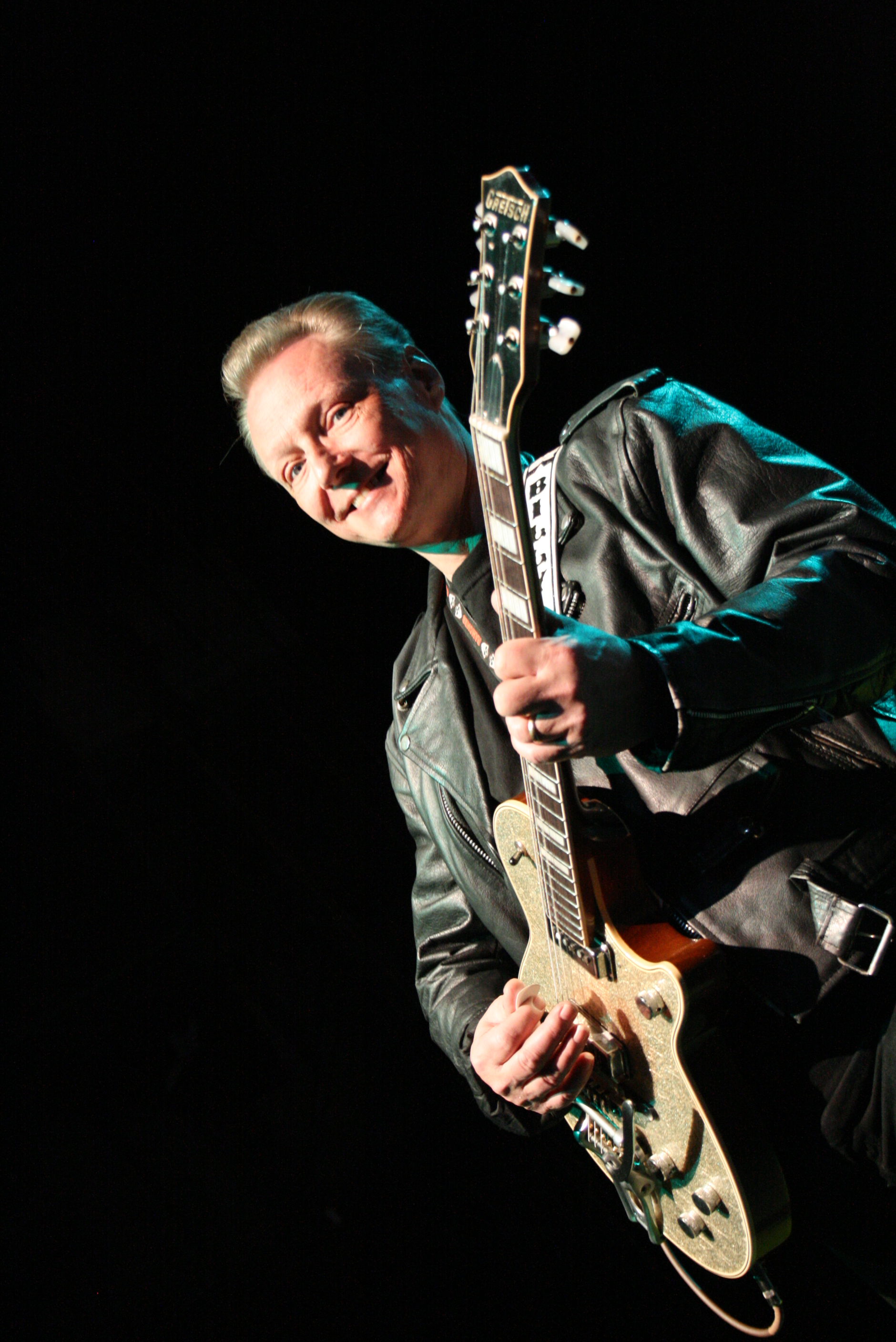

Background information
- Born: Stuart Tyson Kindell; February 20, 1948 (age 78); Savanna, Illinois, US
- Origin: Los Angeles, California
- Genres: Rockabilly; punk rock
- Occupations: Musician; record producer
- Instruments: Guitar; saxophone
- Member of: X

Billy Zoom (born Stuart Tyson Kindell; February 20, 1948) is an American guitarist, best known as one of the co-founders of the punk rock band X.

== Early life ==
The son of a big band woodwinds player, Kindell began playing a variety of instruments, including violin, accordion, piano, clarinet, tenor, alto, and baritone saxophones, flute, banjo, and guitar.

Upon moving to Los Angeles in the 1960s, he worked as a session guitarist while attending technical school for training in electronics repair. He has a reputation as an expert in the maintenance, restoration, and modification of vintage tube amplifiers and combo organs. He has performed custom technical work on the amps for a host of electric guitarists and bassists.

== Career ==
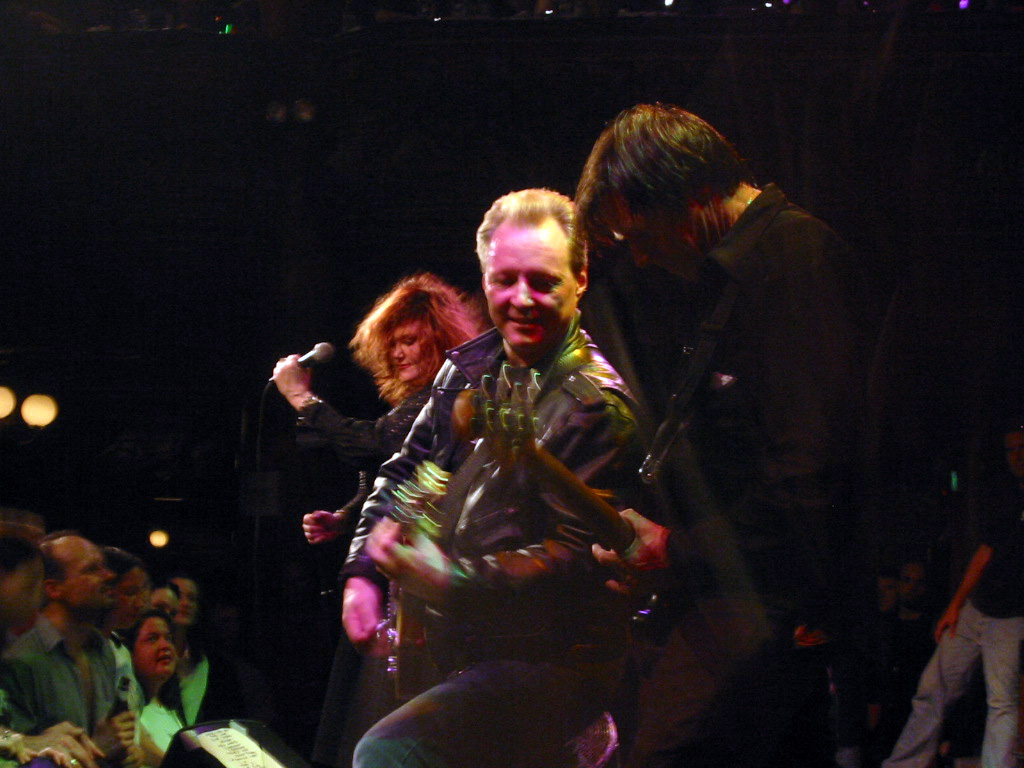
Billy Zoom (center) performing with the band X in 2004

After submitting a string of demos to every record label he could find under his name Ty Kindell, he chose his stage name to get attention from executives who may have already rejected him.

Zoom is best known as a guitarist and founding member of punk rock band X. He co-founded the group in 1977 with bassist-singer John Doe, and X was praised as one of the most influential American rock groups of the 1980s, with a style that touched on rockabilly, country and folk. He stayed with the band until 1986, occasionally performing on saxophone, and recording five studio albums along with many tours and live concerts. He rejoined in 1999, and recorded two more albums with X.

He has also worked with rockabilly legend Gene Vincent, the Blasters, Etta James, Big Joe Turner, Mike Ness, and dozens of other major recording artists.

On stage, he is known for his wide-legged stance, big grin and tendency to make eye contact with audience members. He adopted this presence in reaction to many guitarists whose body histrionics and facial expressions gave the impression that they were playing very difficult parts on their instruments. Zoom, in contrast, wanted to make everything look easy.

In June 2008, Gretsch guitars unveiled a custom model tailored to Zoom's specification, the G6129BZ Billy Zoom Custom Shop Tribute Silver Jet, as a tribute to his career and influence. Zoom is a longtime user of Gretsch guitars, and his equipment is well documented.

== Personal life ==
Zoom became a Christian around the time X started, having grown up in a secular household. While being a self-described conservative, Zoom has criticized the American two-party system.

In 2015, at 67 years old, Zoom was diagnosed with an aggressive form of bladder cancer and began immediate treatment. He has since stated that he is "cancer-free" but will continue receiving chemotherapy treatments.
