= Tom Russell discography =

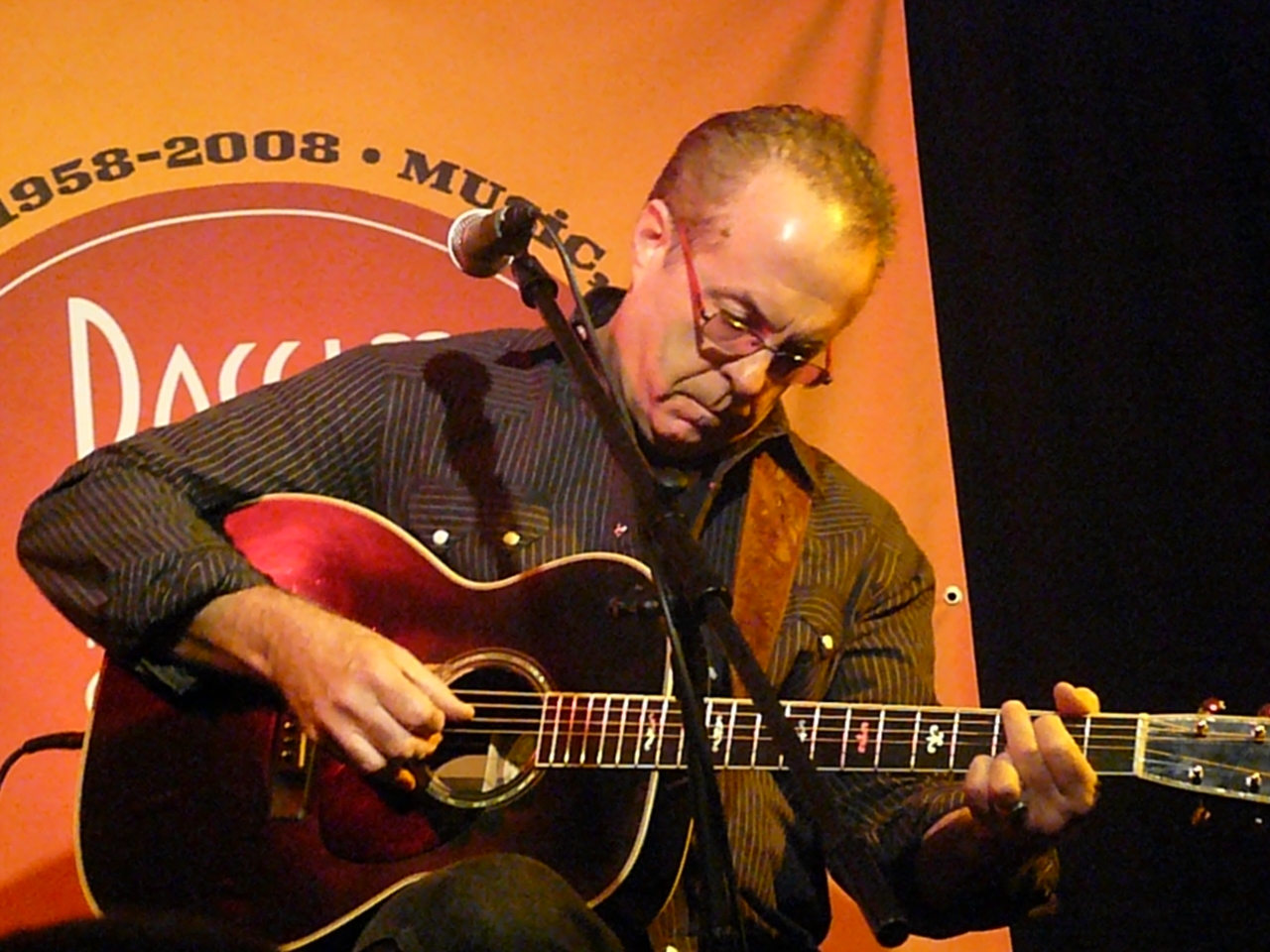
- Tom Russell August 22, 2008 at Club Passim in Cambridge, Massachusetts.
- Studio albums: 29
- EPs: 3
- Live albums: 2
- Compilation albums: 11
- Tribute albums: 1
- Singles: 9
- Video albums: 3

Tom Russell is an American singer-songwriter. His discography consists of 29 studio albums, 3 live albums, 11 compilations, 3 videos, 3 EPs, 9 singles and 1 tribute album. In addition, his compositions have been featured on a number of albums by other artists.

== Studio recordings ==
Year	Album	Label	Notes
1976	Ring of Bone	Demo / End Of The Trail	with Patricia Hardin
1978	Wax Museum	Demo / End Of The Trail	with Patricia Hardin
1984	Heart on a Sleeve	Edsel	
1987	Road to Bayamon	Philo	Tom Russell Band
1989	Poor Man's Dream	Philo	Tom Russell Band
1991	Hurricane Season	Philo	Tom Russell Band
1991	Cowboy Real	Philo	
1993	Box of Visions	Philo	
1993	Hillbilly Voodoo	Stony Plain	with Barrence Whitfield
1994	Cowboy Mambo	ESD	with Barrence Whitfield
1995	The Rose of the San Joaquin	HighTone / Shout!	
1997	The Long Way Around	HighTone	
1997	Song of the West	HighTone	
1999	The Man from God Knows Where	HighTone	
2000	All Around These Northern Towns	Norske Gram	Tom Russell Band - released in Norway
2001	Borderland	HighTone / Shout!	
2003	Modern Art	HighTone / Shout!	
2004	Indians Cowboys Horses Dogs	HighTone / Shout!	
2005	Hotwalker	HighTone / Shout!	
2006	Love and Fear	HighTone / Shout!	
2009	One to the Heart, One to the Head	Scarlet Letter / Scarlet Letter Records	with Gretchen Peters
2009	Blood and Candle Smoke	Shout!	
2011	Mesabi	Shout!	
2014	Midway To Bayamon	lost tapes 1985-87 plus a 1992 live track	
2015	The Rose of Roscrae	Proper	
2017	Play One More: The Songs of Ian & Sylvia	True North	With two bonus tracks performed by Ian & Sylvia
2017	Folk Hotel	Frontera	Also a book with lyrics, art, and short stories.
2018	Old Songs Yet To Sing	Frontera	Early classics re-recorded with guitarist Andrew Hardin.
2019	October in the Railroad Earth	Frontera	Release date: March 15, 2019.

== Live albums ==
Year	Album	Label	Notes
2007	Lost Angels Of Lyon	Frontera	Tom Russell band recorded May 18th, 1987 in Lyon France
2013	Aztec Jazz	Frontera	with The Norwegian Wind Ensemble

== Compilation albums ==
Year	Album	Label	Notes
1993	Beyond St. Olav's Gate 1979 - 1992	Round Tower	culled from albums released between 1979 and 1992
1996	Tom Russell & Patricia Hardin: The Early Years	Edsel	
2002	Museum of Memories 1972–2002	Dark Angel / Village	Previously unreleased rarities
2005	Raw Vision: The Tom Russell Band 1984-1994	Philo	
2008	Veterans Day: The Tom Russell Anthology	HighTone / Shout!	
2010	Cowboy'd All To Hell	Frontera	
2013	Museum of Memories Vol. 2 (1973–2013)	Frontera	Previously unreleased rarities
2014	Tonight We Ride	Frontera	
2014	The Western Years	Rockbeat	culled from albums released between 1999 and 2006
2015	Hilly Voodoo & Cowboy Mambo	Rockbeat	with Barrence Whitfield - compilation of two albums plus bonus tracks
2016	Gunpowder Sunsets: The Tom Russell Anthology 2	Frontera	

== Videos ==
Year	Title	Label	Notes
2005	Hearts on the Line	Hightone	documents 2004 cross-Canada train trip and performances
2008	Mano a Mano	Canyon Productions	documents songwriting workshop with Ian Tyson at the National Cowboy Poetry Gathering in Elko, Nevada
2011	Don't Look Down	Frontera	documentary by Tom and Nadine Russell and Eric Temple

== EPs ==
Year	Album	Label	Tracks
2004	Tonight We Ride	HighTone	"Tonight We Ride" / "Old Cheyenne" / "John Wesley Harding" / "Osceola's Last Words" / "Crucifix In A Death Hand / Carmelita"
2006	The Pugilist At 59	HighTone	"The Pugilist At 59" / "Stealing Electricity" / "Ash Wednesday" / "Red Dirt Girl" / "Tower Of Song"
2006	Who's Gonna Build Your Wall?	HighTone	"Who's Gonna Build Your Wall?" / "California Snow" / "Across The Borderline" / "What We Talk About, When We Talk About Love" / "The Other Side Of Crazy"

== Singles ==
Year	Single	CAN Country	Album	Label
1982	"Gallo De Cielo" / "Wise Blood"	—	—N/a	End Of The Trail
1986	"Road to Bayamon" / "Shut Out The Light"	—	—N/a	End Of The Trail
1988	"Home Before Dark" / "I'm On Fire"	83	Road to Bayamon	Philo
1989	"Walkin' on the Moon"	62	Poor Man's Dream	Philo
1990	"Blue Wing"	36	Poor Man's Dream	Philo
1990	"Heart of a Working Man"	48	Poor Man's Dream	Philo
1991	"Spanish Burgundy"	48	Poor Man's Dream	Philo
1991	"Claude Dallas" / "St. Olav's Gate"	48	Cowboy Real	Sonet
1992	"Black Pearl"	35	Hurricane Season	Philo

== Guest singles ==
Year	Single	Artist	CAN Country	Album
1990	"Thrown to the Wolves"	Sylvia Tyson	43	You Were on My Mind

== Tribute albums ==
Year	Album	Label	Notes
2007	The Wounded Heart of America	HighTone / Shout!	

== As primary artist/contributor ==
- 1994: various artists- Tulare Dust: A Songwriters' Tribute to Merle Haggard (HighTone) - track 1, "Tulare Dust / They're Tearin' The Labor Camps Down" (reissued in 2014 with bonus concert disc)
- 2000: various artists - Seka ["Sister"] Vol. 2 (Twah!) - track 10, "Veteran's Day"
- 2003: various artists - Kerrville Folk Festival: Early Years 1972-1981 (Silverwolf) track 5-13, "Second Time Around" and track 6-07, "Joshua Tree" (both with Patricia Hardin)
- 2003: various artists- Kerrville Folk Festival Highlights (Silverwolf) - track 2, "Mineral Wells"
- 2005: various artists - KGSR Broadcasts Vol. 13 (KGSR) - track 1-04, "Tonight We Ride"
- 2006: various artists - A Case for Case: A Tribute to the Songs of Peter Case (Hungry For Music) - track 1-04, "A Little Wind (Could Blow Me Away)"
- 2007: various artists - The Gift: A Tribute To Ian Tyson (Stony Plain) - track 10, "Old Cheyenne"
- 2009: various artists - Man of Somebody's Dreams, A Tribute to Chris Gaffney (Yep Roc) - track 6, "If Daddy Don't Sing Danny Boy"
- 2010: various artists - KPIG Greatest Hits Vol. 3 (Quilted Fish) - track 2, "Blue Wing" (with Dave Alvin)

== As composer ==
=== 1979–1995 ===
- 1979: A Grain Of Salt - High Energy Grass (Hi Spot) - track 3, "Leprechaun Reel" (co-written with Gary Smith)
- 1986: Nanci Griffith - The Last of the True Believers (Philo) - track 3, "St. Olav's Gate"
- 1987: Ian Tyson - Cowboyography (Sugar Hill) - track 1, "Navajo Rug"; track 6, "Claude Dallas"
- 1988: Nanci Griffith - Little Love Affairs (MCA) - track 9, "Outbound Plane"
- 1989: Sylvia Tyson - You Were On My Mind (Stony Plain) - track 4, "Walking On The Moon" (co-written with Katy Moffatt) and track 5, "Thrown To The Wolves" (co-written with Sylvia Tyson)
- 1990: Desert Rose Band - Pages of Life (MCA) - track 3, "Missing You" (co-written with Chris Hillman and Richard Sellars)
- 1990: Suzanne Klee - California Blue (Baur Music) - track 3, "Walkin' On The Moon" (co-written with Katy Moffat)
- 1995: Peter Case - Torn Again (Vanguard) - track 7, "A Little Wind (Could Blow Me Away)" (co-written with Peter Case)
- 1995: Any Old Time - Crossing (Dara) - track 13, "Saint Olav's Gate"
- 1995: The Hitchin' Post - Roadmap (Glitterhouse) - track 11, "One And One"
- 1995: Quartette - Work Of The Heart (Denon) - track 10, "Street Of The Mariachi" (co-written with Sylvia Tyson)

=== 1996 – present ===
- 1996: Bob Neuwirth - Look Up (Watermelon) - track 5, "Beyond The Blues" (co-written with Peter Case and Bob Neuwirth)
- 1996: Katy Moffatt and Kate Brislin - Sleepless Nights (Rounder) - track 11, "I'll Take The Blame" (co-written with Katy Moffatt)
- 1998: Dave Alvin - Blackjack David (HighTone) - track 4, "California Snow" (co-written with Dave Alvin)
- 1999: Ramblin' Jack Elliott - The Long Ride (HighTone) - track 8, "The Sky Above And The Mud Below"
- 2001: Suzy Bogguss - Live At Caffe Milano (Loyal Dutchess) - track 12, "Outbound Plane" (co-written with Nanci Griffith)
- 2002: Dave Alvin and the Guilty Men - Out in California (HighTone) - track 1, "Out In California" and track 2, "Haley's Comet" (both songs co-written with Dave Alvin)
- 2004: Dave Alvin - Ashgrove (Yep Roc) - track 2, "Rio Grande" (co-written with Dave Alvin)
- 2005: Chris Hillman - The Other Side (Sovereign Artists) - track 11, "Missing You" (co-written with Chris Hillman and Richard Sellers)
- 2005: Dave Alvin and the Guilty Men - The Great American Music Galaxy (Yep Roc) - track 12, "Out In California" (co-written with Dave Alvin)
- 2006: Dave Alvin - West of the West (Yep Roc) - track 9, "Between The Cracks" (co-written with Dave Alvin)
- 2011: Dead Rock West - Bright Morning Stars (Red River) - track 4, "Beyond the Blues" (co-written with Bob Neuwirth and Peter Case)
- 2012: Gretchen Peters - Hello Cruel World (Proper / Scarlet Letter) - track 2, "Saint Francis" (co-written with Gretchen Peters)
- 2012: Marley's Ghost - Jubilee (Sage Arts) - track 9, "Hank and Audrey" (co-written with Katy Moffatt)
- 2015: Ian Tyson - Carnero Vaquero (Stony Plain) - track 9, "Wolves No Longer Sing" (co-written with Ian Tyson)

== As producer ==
- 1993: Katy Moffatt - The Greatest Show On Earth (Philo)
- 1994: Sylvia Tyson - Gypsy Cadillac (Round Tower)

== Also appears on ==
- 1972: Sailcat - Motorcycle Mama (Elektra) - banjo
