= Katy Moffatt discography =

- Studio albums: 18
- Live albums: 2
- Compilation albums: 2
- Singles: 6

Katy Moffatt is an American musician, lyricist, composer, and vocalist. Her discography consists of 18 studio albums, 1 live album, 2 compilations, and 6 singles. In addition, she has been featured as a performer on many albums by other artists.

== Studio albums ==
- 1976: Katy (Columbia)
- 1978: Kissin’ in the California Sun (Columbia)
- 1988: Walkin’ on the Moon (Philo / Red Moon)
- 1989: Child Bride (Philo)
- 1992: Dance Me Outside (Philo) with Hugh Moffatt
- 1992: Indoor Fireworks (Red Moon) with the Great Unknown
- 1993: The Greatest Show On Earth (Philo)
- 1993: The Evangeline Hotel (Philo)
- 1994: Hearts Gone Wild (Watermelon)
- 1996: Sleepless Nights (Rounder) with Kate Brislin)
- 1996: Midnight Radio (Round Tower Music)
- 1998: Angel Town (HighTone)
- 1999: Loose Diamond (HighTone)
- 2001: Cowboy Girl (Shanachie)
- 2008: Fewer Things (Zeppelin)
- 2016: Now and then (SOHL) with Hugh Moffatt
- 2017: Where The Heart Is (Centerfire)

== Live albums ==
- 2010: Playin' Fool (Live in Holland) (Strictly Country)
- 2005: Up Close and Personal (Fuel)

== Compilations ==
- 2002: Katy / Kissin In The California Sun (Westside/Demon)
- 2009: Trilogy (Floating World/Evangeline) - compilation of The Evangeline Hotel, Hearts Gone Wild, and Midnight Radio.

== Singles ==
- 1976: "Easy Come, Easy Go" (Columbia)
- 1976: "I Can Almost See Houston From Here" (#83 Country) / "Take Me Back To Texas" (Columbia)
- 1977: "Um-Um-Um-Um-Um-Um (Stereo)" / "Um-Um-Um-Um-Um-Um (Mono)" (Columbia)
- 1977: "Up On The Roof" (Columbia)
- 1981: "Take It As It Comes" (#81 Country) / "Hard Country" (with Michael Murphey, Epic)
- 1983: "Under Loved And Over Lonely" (#66 Country) / "Let's Make Something Of it" (Permian)
- 1984: "Reynosa" (#82 Country) / Lonely But Only For You" (Permian)
- 1984: "This Ain't Tennessee And He Ain't You" (#66 Country) / "Midnight Harbor" (Permian)

== As composer ==
- 1989: Sylvia Tyson - You Were On My Mind (Stony Plain) - track 4, "Walking On The Moon" (co-written with Tom Russell)
- 1989: Janie Fricke - Labor of Love (Columbia) - track 5, "Walking On The Moon" (co-written with Tom Russell)
- 1990: Suzanne Klee - California Blue (Baur) - track 3, "Walking On The Moon" (co-written with Tom Russell)
- 1990: Tom Russell - Poor Man's Dream (Philo) - track 4, "Walking On The Moon" (co-written with Tom Russell)
- 1992: Tom Russell - Box of Visions (Philo) - track 11, "The Extra Mile" (co-written with Tom Russell)
- 1993: Rosie Flores - Once More with Feeling (Hightone / Shout!) - track 5, "Ruin This Romance" (co-written with Rosie Flores and Wendy Waldman); track 10, "Real Man" (co-written with Rosie Flores)
- 1996: Janet Burgan - Janet Burgan (self-released) - track 2, "Walking On The Moon" (co-written with Tom Russell)
- 1996: Kate Brislin - Sleepless Nights (Rounder) - track 5, "Still Blue" (co-written with Wendy Waldman); track 11, "I'll Take the Blame" (co-written with Tom Russell)
- 1996: Merrie Amsterburg - Season of Rain - (Q Division) - track 3, "Walking On The Moon" (co-written with Tom Russell)
- 1998: Tom Russell - The Man From God Knows Where (HighTone) - track 7, "The Dreamin'" (co-written with Tom Russell)
- 2001: Tom Russell - Borderland (Hightone / Shout) - track 7, "The Next Thing Smokin'" (co-written with Tom Russell)
- 2004: Mary Duff - Heartbreaker (Rosette) - track 6, "Walking On The Moon" (co-written with Tom Russell)
- 2006: Mick Overman and the Maniacs - Good Thing Happen (Max) - track 9, "Take Me Back To Texas" (co-written with Greg Leisz)
- 2012: Marley's Ghost - Jubilee (Sage Arts) - track 9, "Hank and Audrey" (co-written with Tom Russell)

== As primary artist/song contributor ==
- 1993: various artists - Love Gets Strange: The Songs of John Hiatt (Rhino) - track 4, "We Ran"
- 1994: various artists - Tulare Dust : A Songwriter's Tribute To Merle Haggard (HighTone) - track 13, "I Can't Be Myself"
- 1998: various artists - What's That I Hear? The Songs of Phil Ochs (Sliced Bread) - track 2-09, "Here's To The State Of Mississippi"
- 2002: Skip Heller - Career Suicide: The Skip Heller Anthology 1994-2001 (Dionysus) - vocals on track 23, "Whipping Post"
- 2004: various artists - A Western Jubilee: Songs and Stories of the American West (Dualtone) - track 9, "The Brazos"

== Also appears on ==
=== 1974 - 1993 ===
- 1974: Monroe Doctrine - Monroe Doctrine (Falls River) - vocals on track 4, "Anderson's Hotel"
- 1976: Funky Kings - Funky Kings (Arista) - vocals on track 7, "Let Me Go"
- 1979: Michael Martin Murphey - Peaks, Valleys, Honky Tonks & Alleys (Epic) - vocals
- 1987: Dave Alvin - Romeo's Escape (Epic) - vocals
- 1987: George Highfill - Waitin' Up (Warner Bros.) - vocals, duet
- 1987: Hugh Moffatt - Loving You (Philo) - vocals
- 1989: Hugh Moffatt - Troubadour (Philo) - vocals
- 1989: Jeff Turner - Tonight... (K-tel) - vocals
- 1990: Tom Kell - One Sad Night (Warner Bros.) - vocals
- 1991: Bob Neuwirth - 99 Monkeys (eOne/Koch) - vocals
- 1991: Dave Alvin - Blue Blvd (Hightone) - vocals
- 1992: Tom Russell - Box of Visions (Philo) - vocals
- 1993: Austin Lounge Lizards - Paint Me on Velvet (Flying Fish) - vocals
- 1993: Dave Alvin - Museum of Heart (Hightone) - vocals
- 1993: Rosie Flores - Once More with Feeling (Hightone/Shout! Factory) - vocals

=== 1994 - present ===
- 1994: Richard Meyer - A Letter from the Open Sky (Shanachie) - vocals
- 1994: Steve Young - Switchblades Of Love (Round Tower) - vocals
- 1995: Tom Russell - The Rose of the San Joaquin (Hightone/Shout! Factory) - vocals
- 1996: Charlie Louvin - The Longest Train (Watermelon) - vocals
- 1996: Country Dick Montana - The Devil Lied To Me (Bar/None)- vocals
- 1996: Dave Alvin - Interstate City (Hightone/Shout! Factory) - vocals
- 1996: Kate Brislin - Sleepless Nights (Rounder) - guitar, vocals
- 1997: Tom Russell - The Long Way Around (Hightone) - vocals
- 1997: Tom Russell - Song Of The West (Hightone) - vocals
- 1998: Skip Heller - St. Christopher's Arms (Mouthpiece) - duet vocals
- 2000: Rick Shea - Sawbones (Aim) - vocals
- 2001: Charles Sawtelle - Music From Rancho DeVille (Acoustic Disc) - vocals
- 2005: Rick Shea - Bound for Trouble (Tres Pescadores) - duet vocals
- 2006: Charlie Louvin - Echoes of the Louvin Brothers (Varèse Sarabande) - vocals
