= Eleven Eleven (Dave Alvin album) =

Studio album by Dave Alvin
- Released: June 20, 2011
- Genre: Folk rock, country rock
- Length: 49:35
- Label: Yep Roc
- Producer: Dave Alvin

Dave Alvin chronology
| Dave Alvin and the Guilty Women (2009) | Eleven Eleven (2011) | Common Ground: Dave & Phil Alvin Play and Sing the Songs of Big Bill Broonzy (2014) |

Eleven Eleven is the eleventh studio album by folk rock musician Dave Alvin. It was released on June 20, 2011, on Yep Roc Records, and an expanded reissue was released on April 17, 2012.

== Recording ==
The recording of Eleven Eleven was influenced by the then-recent deaths of Alvin's friends Chris Gaffney and Amy Farris. The eleven songs on Eleven Eleven were written over the course of seven months, with three exceptions: the three duets on the album, which were "What's Up With Your Brother", "Manzanita", and "Two Lucky Bums". "What's Up With Your Brother" is a duet between Alvin and his brother, Phil Alvin, in which both brothers sing together for the first time on record since the breakup of their legendary band "The Blasters". "Manzanita" is a duet between Alvin and Christy McWilson, a member of his band, the Guilty Women. "Two Lucky Bums" is a duet between Alvin and Chris Gaffney, and represents Gaffney's last recording before he died in 2008. The song "Harlan County Line" was written for the TV show Justified.

== Critical reception ==
Professional ratings
Aggregate scores
| Source | Rating |
|---|---|
| Metacritic | 84/100 |
Review scores
| Source | Rating |
| AllMusic | 4/5 stars |
| American Songwriter | 4/5 stars |
| The Independent | 4/5 stars |
| Los Angeles Times | 3.5/4 stars |
| Mojo | 4/5 stars |
| MSN Music (Expert Witness) | A− |
| PopMatters | 8/10 |
| Record Collector | 4/5 stars |
| Rolling Stone | 3.5/5 stars |
| Uncut | 4/5 stars |

Eleven Eleven received mostly favorable reviews from critics. Wayne Robins wrote in American Songwriter that the album's best songs were "character studies or snapshots of history". Many critics described "Johnny Ace is Dead" as one of the best songs on the album, with Steve Horowitz of PopMatters calling it "the best damn Johnny Ace song one could ever imagine."

== Track listing ==
All tracks composed by Dave Alvin; except where indicated

1. "Harlan County Line" – 5:12
2. "Johnny Ace Is Dead" – 4:27
3. "Black Rose of Texas" – 4:52
4. "Gary, Indiana 1959" – 4:06
5. "Run Conejo Run" – 4:52
6. "No Worries Mija" (Chris Gaffney) – 3:36
7. "What's Up with Your Brother?" – 4:44 (duet with Phil Alvin)
8. "Murrietta's Head" – 5:59
9. "Manzanita" (Christy McWilson) – 4:09 (duet with McWilson)
10. "Dirty Nightgown" – 5:19
11. "Two Lucky Bums" – 2:28 (duet with Chris Gaffney)

Bonus tracks on 2012 reissue

1. "Beautiful City 'Cross the River"
2. "Signal Hill"
3. "Never Trust a Woman" (duet with Candye Kane)

== Personnel ==
- Dave Alvin – vocals, guitar
- Phil Alvin – vocals
- Gregory Boaz – bass
- Chris Gaffney – accordion, vocals
- Bob Glaub – bass, percussion
- Don Heffington – drums, percussion, timbales
- David Jackson – accordion, upright bass
- Greg Leisz – baritone guitar, guitar, lap steel guitar
- Christy McWilson – piano, vocals
- Steve Mugalian – drums, percussion
- Danny Ott – slide guitar, guitar, vocal harmony
- Wyman Reese – organ, piano
- Jack Rudy – harmonica
- Rick Shea – guitar, pedal steel guitar
- Gene Taylor – piano

Production

- Dave Alvin – producer
- Craig Parker Adams – engineer, mixing
- Joe Gastwirt – mastering
- Michael Triplett – art direction, design
- Harry Sabin – photo assistance
- Nancy Sefton – art direction
- Beth Herzhaft – photography
