= King of California (album) =

Studio album by Dave Alvin
- Released: 1994
- Genre: Folk rock, country rock
- Length: 54:49
- Label: Hightone
- Producer: Greg Leisz

Dave Alvin chronology
Museum of Heart (1993)	King of California (1994)	Interstate City (1996)

King of California is an album by the American musician Dave Alvin, released in 1994.

== Reception ==
Professional ratings
Review scores
Source	Rating
AllMusic	3/5 stars
Robert Christgau	A–

AllMusic critic Mark Deming wrote: "While King of California was often lumped in with the then-fashionable unplugged craze, in retrospect it was the album where Dave Alvin's abilities as a performer began to catch up with his gifts as a songwriter, pointing the way for his later albums Blackjack David and Public Domain."

== Track listing ==
All songs by Dave Alvin unless otherwise noted.

1. "King of California" – 4:51
2. "Barn Burning" – 4:01
3. "Fourth of July" – 4:35
4. "Goodbye Again" (Dave Alvin, Rosie Flores) – 3:58 (duet with Flores)
5. "East Texas Blues" (Alex Moore) – 4:07
6. "Every Night About This Time" – 4:24
7. "Bus Station" – 4:04
8. "Mother Earth" (Memphis Slim) – 3:39
9. "Blue Wing" (Tom Russell) – 3:43
10. "Little Honey" (Alvin, John Doe) – 5:10
11. "(I Won't Be) Leaving" – 5:06
12. "What Am I Worth" (Darrell Edwards, George Jones) – 3:20 (duet with Syd Straw)
13. "Border Radio" – 3:51

=== Bonus tracks on 2019 reissue ===
1. "Riverbed Rag" – 3:11
2. "The Cuckoo" – 4:06 (duet with Katy Moffatt)
3. "Kern River" (Merle Haggard) – 3:55

== Personnel ==
- Dave Alvin – vocals, guitar
- Chris Gaffney – background vocals
- Bob Glaub – bass
- Patrick Warren – keyboards
- Don Heffington – drums, percussion
- James Cruce – drums, percussion, washboard
- Bob Clar – bass, percussion
- Greg Leisz – guitar, slide guitar, pedal steel guitar, lap slide guitar, Weissenborn, mandolin
- Alan Deremo – bass
- Skip Edwards – accordion, organ
- Don Falzone – bass
- Rosie Flores – vocals on "Goodbye Again"
- Bobby Lloyd Hicks – drums, percussion, background vocals
- James Intveld – bass
- David Jackson – accordion
- Donald Lindley – drums, percussion, background vocals
- Syd Straw – vocals on "What Am I Worth"
- Steve Van Gelder – fiddle
- Jimmie Wood - Harmonica

== Production notes ==
- Paul DuGre – engineer, mixing
- Joe Peccerillo – assistant engineer
- Gavin Lurssen – mastering
- Shelly Heber – design
- Beth Herzhaft – photography
