= Out in California =

Live album by Dave Alvin
- Released: May 21, 2002
- Recorded: 2001, 2002
- Genre: Folk rock, country rock
- Length: 1:15:58
- Label: HighTone
- Producer: Dave Alvin, Mark Linett

Dave Alvin chronology
Public Domain (2000)	Out in California (2002)	Ashgrove (2004)

Out in California is a live album by American artist Dave Alvin and the Guilty Men, released in 2002. It was recorded live in August 2001 in Santa Barbara and in January 2002 in Pasadena, California.

== Reception ==
Professional ratings
Review scores
Source	Rating
Allmusic	4/5 stars
Robert Christgau	(dud)

Writing for Allmusic, music critic Rick Anderson wrote of the album "As live albums tend to be, it's a curious mix of the familiar and the obscure."

== Track listing ==
All songs by Dave Alvin unless otherwise noted.

1. "Out in California" (Dave Alvin, Tom Russell) – 6:49
2. "Haley's Comet" (Alvin, Russell) – 4:48
3. "Little Honey/Who Do You Love?" (Dave Alvin, John Doe, Bo Diddley) – 9:21
4. "Abilene" – 6:51
5. "Don't Let Your Deal Go Down" – 7:32
6. "Highway 99" – 4:14
7. "Andersonville" – 5:30
8. "All 'Round Man" (Bo Carter) – 3:59
9. "Blue Boulevard" (Alvin, Michael Woody) – 6:15
10. "Wanda and Duane" – 4:14
11. "4th of July" – 5:33
12. "American Music" – 7:01
13. "Everything's Gonna Be Alright" (Little Walter Jacobs) – 3:45

== Personnel ==
- Dave Alvin – vocals, guitar, National Steel guitar
- Chris Gaffney – background vocals, accordion
- Gregory Boaz – bass
- Joe Terry – keyboards
- Bobby Lloyd Hicks – drums, backing vocals
- Greg Leisz – dobro, guitar
- Rick Shea – guitar, pedal steel guitar, lap steel guitar, mandolin, backing vocals
- Brantley Kearns – fiddle, backing vocals
- John "Juke" Logan – harmonica

== Production notes ==
- Mark Linett – producer, engineer, mixing
- Lou Beach – design
- Issa Sharp – photography
- Steve Smith – photography
