= Museum of Heart =

Studio album by Dave Alvin
- Released: 1993
- Genre: Soul blues
- Length: 51:47
- Label: HighTone
- Producer: Chris Silogyi, Bruce Bromberg, Dave Alvin

Dave Alvin chronology
Blue Blvd (1991)	Museum of Heart (1993)	King of California (1994)

Museum of Heart is an album by the American musician Dave Alvin, released in 1993. Alvin considered the album to be mainly in the soul blues style. He promoted Museum of Heart by touring with his band, the Guilty Men.

== Production ==
The album was produced by Chris Silogyi, Bruce Bromberg, and Alvin; Bromberg encouraged Alvin to add more of a bluesy sound to his guitar work. Former Blaster Lee Allen played saxophone on some of the songs. Alvin worked on some of the songs for King of California during the same period. Syd Straw and Katy Moffatt contributed to the album.

"Thirty Dollar Room" is about the touring life. "Burning in Water, Drowning in Flame" takes its title from a Charles Bukowski poetry collection.

== Critical reception ==
Professional ratings
Review scores
Source	Rating
AllMusic	3/5 stars
Calgary Herald	B+
Fort Worth Star-Telegram	3/4 stars
The Indianapolis Star	3.5/4 stars
The Republican	4/5 stars

Trouser Press wrote that Alvin's "comfortable within his narrow [vocal] range, letting his pithy songwriting carry the load." The Chicago Reader noted that "even the least of Alvin’s material is redeemed by his robust energy and expansive delivery." The Fort Worth Star-Telegram praised the "clear-headed meditations on lost romance."

The Orlando Sentinel opined that "Alvin's rugged baritone is surprisingly effective on ballads." The Los Angeles Times concluded that "Alvin's lyrics convey the heartache and longing you hear in the voices of great country singers like George Jones but rarely find in their material anymore."

AllMusic's Denise Sullivan wrote that "Alvin's vision falters slightly, as none of the songs here are as instantly likable or classic as on previous outings."

== Track listing ==
All songs by Dave Alvin.

1. "Museum of Heart" – 4:26
2. "Don't Talk About Her" – 4:59
3. "A Woman's Got a Right" – 4:58
4. "Between the Cracks" – 4:26
5. "Thirty Dollar Room" – 4:23
6. "The Devil's Wind" – 4:15
7. "Burning in Water, Drowning in Flame" – 3:09
8. "One Eye's Ballad" – 0:57
9. "Longer Than I Thought" – 5:05
10. "Six Nights a Week" – 3:40
11. "Stranger in Town" – 4:47
12. "As She Slowly Turns to Leave" – 5:26
13. "Florence Avenue Lullaby" – 1:16

== Personnel ==
- Dave Alvin – vocals, guitar
- Don Falzone – bass
- Rick Solem – keyboards, background vocals
- Bobby Lloyd Hicks – drums
- Donald Lindley – drums
- Greg Leisz – guitar, mandolin, lap steel guitar
- Michael "Bami" Rose – tenor saxophone, baritone saxophone
- Lee Allen – tenor saxophone
- Leon Haywood – organ
- Stephen Hodges – congas, percussion, vibraphone
- John Logan – background vocals
- Syd Straw – background vocals
- Fontaine Brown – background vocals
- John Doe – background vocals
- Katy Moffatt – background vocals

Production

- Charlie Bracco – engineer, mixing
- Chris Bellman – mastering
- Stephen Walker – design
- Beth Herzhaft – photography
