= Halley's Comet (disambiguation) =

Halley's Comet is a short-period comet visible from Earth every 75–77 years.

Halley's Comet or Haley's Comet may also refer to:

- Halley's Comet (video game), a 1986 arcade game
- "Haley's Comet", a song by Dave Alvin from the album Blue Blvd (1991)
- "Halley's Comet", a song by Billie Eilish from the album Happier Than Ever (2021)

== See also ==
- Halley's Comet Opal, gemstone discovered in 1986 when the comet was visible
- Bill Haley & His Comets, band named for the comet
  - Bill Haley and His Comets, their self-titled album

Halley's Comet is the name of the bus driven by the title character of cartoonist Gus Ariola's long lasting comic strip "Gordo."
