= Loser's Paradise =

Studio album by Chris Gaffney
- Released: 1995
- Recorded: February 1995
- Studio: Congress House Studio, Austin, Texas
- Genre: Country music
- Length: 41:40
- Label: HighTone Records
- Producer: Dave Alvin

Chris Gaffney chronology
Man of Somebody's Dreams (1994)	Loser's Paradise (1995)

Loser's Paradise is an album by country music singer-songwriter Chris Gaffney, released in 1995 on HighTone Records. It was Gaffney's second album released on HighTone, and was produced by Dave Alvin. It was recorded over a 10-day period in Austin, Texas.

Professional ratings
Review scores
Source	Rating
Allmusic	4/5 stars
Chicago Tribune	3/4 stars
Los Angeles Times	3.5/4 stars
No Depression	mixed
Philadelphia City Paper	favorable
The Village Voice	(choice cut)
The Virgin Encyclopedia of Country Music	4/5 stars

== Track listing ==
1. "The Eyes of Roberto Duran"
2. "Loser's Paradise"
3. "The Man of Somebody's Dream"
4. "So Far From God (And Too Close to You)"
5. "East of Houston, West of Baton Rouge"
6. "Cowboys to Girls"
7. "Azulito"
8. "My Baby's Got a Dead Man's Number"
9. "See The Big Man Cry"
10. "Help You Dream"
11. "Glasshouse"
12. "Sugar Bee"

== Personnel ==
- Dave Alvin - Acoustic and Electric Guitar, Producer
- Ponty Bone - Accordion
- Sarah Brown - Bass
- Jackson Browne: Composer
- Ed Bruce: Composer
- Gene Elders: Fiddle
- Rosie Flores: Vocals
- Chris Gaffney: Accordion, Guitar, Piano, Vocals
- Kenny Gamble: Composer
- Leon Huff: Composer
- Jim Lauderdale: Vocals
- Donald Lindley: Drums, Percussion
- Ian McLagan: Hammond organ
- Danny Ott: Acoustic and Electric Guitar, Slide Guitar, Background vocals
- Ted Roddy: Harmonica
- Tom Russell: Composer
- Eddie Shuler: Composer
- B.J. Swan: Composer
- James Tuttle: Engineer
- Tony Villanueva: Vocals
- Scott Walls: Pedal Steel
- Dale Watson: Vocals
- Bradley Jaye Williams: Accordion
- Lucinda Williams: Vocals
