= Hacienda Brothers =

American alternative country band

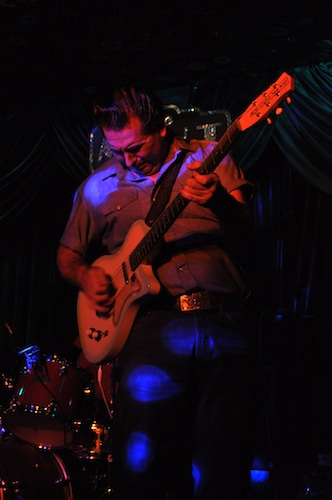
- Dave Gonzalez of Hacienda Brothers - Live in Concert

Background information
- Genres: Americana, alt-country, country rock, rockabilly, Bakersfield sound revival, blues, country soul
- Years active: 2002 - present
- Members: Chris Gaffney; Dave Gonzalez; Dave Berzansky; Dale Daniel; Hank Maninger
- Website: www.haciendabrothers.com

The Hacienda Brothers is an American alternative country band composed of Chris Gaffney, Dave Gonzalez, Dave Berzansky, Dale Daniel, and Hank Maninger. They have been described as "the finest country rock band since the Flying Burrito Brothers in their prime," and were called "the best country band of the decade." Their music blends soul, blues, rockabilly, country, Tex-Mex and rock and roll. They themselves call it "western Soul." The band was hailed as making a "groundbreaking blend of country, rock, blues and accordion-anchored Americana" and by the time founder Chris Gaffney died in 2008 had made three studio albums and one live album.

== History ==
The Hacienda Brothers began in 2002 when friends Chris Gaffney and Dave Gonzalez played together during a planned jam session at the 40th birthday party of their mutual friend Jeb Schoonover. Gaffney was a successful singer and songwriter who had released several albums with the band the Cold Hard Facts and had toured with Dave Alvin. Gonzalez is a singer, songwriter, and guitar player, then mainly active with The Paladins. After playing on stage together, and at the urging of Schoonover (who would become their business partner and manager), they soon joined in Tucson, Arizona, to write and record their first album.

Calling themselves the Hacienda Brothers, they were joined by Dave Berzansky (pedal steel), Hank Maninger (bass, also with the Aqua Velvets), and Dale Daniel (drums). Their self-titled debut (2005) was produced by the legendary Dan Penn, who also wrote two tracks. The album was praised widely; Vintage Guitar called it "a great CD." What's Wrong with Right, also produced by Penn, was released the following year and garnered critical accolades. Bob Mehr, writing for Mojo Magazine, praised its "authentic sawdust-floor shuffles" and "cinematic Morricone twang."

Their self-titled debut album appeared in 2005, and quickly the band received critical recognition for their eclectic music. Their second album, What's Wrong With Right, was chosen by the alternative country magazine No Depression as one of the top 60 albums for 2006 and by R&R as one of the top 100 Albums of 2006. Band leaders Gaffney and Gonzalez were interviewed by Terry Gross on NPR's Fresh Air; and Gonzalez was voted one of the "Top 101 All-time Unsung Guitar Heroes" by Guitar Player Magazine. In 2007, they were nominated for "Group of the Year" by the American Music Association. In August 2007, they released a live album Music for Ranch & Town.

Chris Gaffney died of liver cancer on April 17, 2008, while the band was wrapping up the recording of their third studio album, Arizona Motel. The album received great critical acclaim and was called "forceful and timeless." A positive review accompanied an "in memoriam" article for Gaffney in Vintage Guitar; a later review in the same magazine said the album "kicked butt": "This album delivers more moments of greatness, more consistently, than any of their previous releases and is a fully realized work of music-craft." The band planned on touring in support of a tribute album for Gaffney and did so in 2008; on at least one occasion they were joined by Dave Alvin as a special guest. In 2009, a tribute album to Gaffney was released, A Man of Somebody's Dreams: A Tribute to the Songs of Chris Gaffney, which included songs played by fellow Hacienda Brothers as well as others.

== Song choice ==
Their range of musical taste is evident in their choice of material. In addition to many originals, they have recorded Johnny Cash's "Home of the Blues," "Cry Like a Baby" (originally by the Box Tops), Gamble and Huff's "Cowboys to Girls" (recorded by The Intruders and the Commodores), Charlie Rich's "Rebound" and "Life's Little Ups and Downs," Penn and Oldham's "It Tears Me Up" (also recorded by Percy Sledge), and "Mental Revenge" (a song written for Waylon Jennings by Mel Tillis).

== Band members ==
- Chris Gaffney – vocal and accordion
- Dave Gonzalez – vocal and lead/rhythm guitar
- Hank Maninger – bass guitar
- Dale Daniel – drums
- Dave Berzansky – pedal steel

== Discography ==
- 2005 – Hacienda Brothers
- 2006 – What's Wrong with Right
- 2007 – Music for Ranch & Town: Hacienda Brothers Live (Live, Oslo, Norway, October 8, 2005)
- 2008 – Arizona Motel
- 2019 – Western Soul (compilation of the original demo sessions from March 2003; rough mixes for the debut album from November 2003; unreleased studio tracks from January 2005; plus a couple of alternate takes from November 2006 and December 2007)
