= West of the West =

Studio album by Dave Alvin
- Released: May 30, 2006
- Genres: Folk rock, country rock
- Length: 57:27
- Label: Yep Roc
- Producer: Greg Leisz

Dave Alvin chronology
Ashgrove (2004)	West of the West (2006)	Dave Alvin and the Guilty Women (2009)

West of the West is an album by American artist Dave Alvin, released in 2006. The album pays tribute to California songwriters. It reached number 35 on the Top Independent Albums chart.

== Reception ==
Professional ratings
Review scores
Source	Rating
AllMusic	3.5/5 stars
Robert Christgau	(choice cut)
PopMatters	8/10

Writing for AllMusic, music critic Mark Deming wrote, "While in many respects Alvin is still best described as a songwriter who sings, he knows how to tell a story, and he's picked some great ones for this album." Dan MacIntosh of PopMatters wrote, "Downsides are difficult to find with this new work, because Alvin performs each and every track with an obvious appreciation for the artists who wrote them."

== Track listing ==
1. "California Bloodlines" (John Stewart) – 4:27
2. "Redneck Friend" (Jackson Browne) – 5:04
3. "Kern River" (Merle Haggard) – 4:07
4. "Blind Love" (Tom Waits) – 4:49
5. "Here in California" (Kate Wolf) – 4:35
6. "I Am Bewildered" (Richard Berry) – 3:44
7. "Sonora's Death Row" (Kevin Blackie Farrell) – 5:35
8. "Down on the Riverbed" (David Hidalgo, Louie Pérez) – 4:12
9. "Between the Cracks" (Dave Alvin, Tom Russell) – 4:24
10. "Don't Look Now" (John Fogerty) – 4:02
11. "Tramps and Hawkers" (Jim Ringer) – 4:35
12. "Loser" (Jerry Garcia, Robert Hunter) – 4:52
13. "Surfer Girl" (Brian Wilson) – 3:01
14. "Boss" (Jack Wenzel) - 2:46 (2LP bonus track)

== Personnel ==
- Dave Alvin – vocals, guitar, National Steel guitar
- Chris Gaffney – background vocals
- Bob Glaub – bass
- Don Heffington – drums, percussion
- Bobby Lloyd Hicks – drums
- Gregory Boaz – bass, double bass
- Greg Leisz – guitar, slide guitar, baritone guitar, pedal steel guitar, mandolin, lap slide guitar, background vocals
- Danny Barnes – Banjo
- Kevin Carroll – background vocals
- James Corbitt – background vocals
- Herman Pruitt – background vocals
- Jesus "El Gordo" Cuevas – accordion
- Christy McWilson – vocals
- Chris Montez Miller – guitar, slide guitar
- Jack Rudy – harmonica
- Joe Terry – organ
- David Witham – organ
- Gabe Witcher – violin

Production

- Greg Leisz – producer
- Craig Adams – engineer
- Bill Dashiell – engineer
- Jim Scott – mixing
- Beau Fletcher – mixing assistant
- Steven Rhodes – mixing assistant
- Joe Gastwirt – mastering
- Lou Beach – design
- Deone Jahnke – photography
- Issa Sharp – photography
