= Ashgrove (album) =

Studio album by Dave Alvin
- Released: June 15, 2004
- Genre: Folk rock, country rock
- Length: 52:12
- Label: Yep Roc
- Producer: Greg Leisz

Dave Alvin chronology
Out in California (2002)	Ashgrove (2004)	West of the West (2006)

Ashgrove is an album by American artist Dave Alvin, released in 2004. It reached number 38 on the Top Independent Albums chart.

== Background ==
The title song is in reference to the Ashgrove club where Alvin first saw his early inspirations Big Joe Turner, T-Bone Walker, Lightnin' Hopkins and Reverend Gary Davis. "The Man in the Bed" is a reflection on the death of his father.

== Reception ==
Professional ratings
Review scores
Source	Rating
Allmusic	4/5 stars
PopMatters	(mixed)

Writing for Allmusic, music critic Mark Deming wrote of the album "Dave is rockin' again...though just a little bit... Overall, the quieter material makes up the bulk of Ashgrove's playing time, but the handful of blues-based tunes on board give the set a texture that's cool and sharp, and the result resides in a satisfying middle ground that ought to please fans on both side of the electric guitar issue." Jason MacNeil of PopMatters wrote "His latest album is suggested as a blues album, but you’d be hard pressed to find the mid-tempo blues tunes an improvement on the stellar folk-oriented side."

== Track listing ==
All songs by Dave Alvin unless otherwise noted.

1. "Ashgrove" – 6:15
2. "Rio Grande" (Dave Alvin, Tom Russell) – 4:25
3. "Black Sky" – 4:48
4. "Nine Volt Heart" (Alvin, Rod Hodges) – 4:57
5. "Out of Control" – 6:34
6. "Everett Ruess" – 4:51
7. "Sinful Daughter" (Alvin, Shannon McNally) – 4:28
8. "The Man in the Bed" – 4:35
9. "Black Haired Girl" – 5:25
10. "Somewhere in Time" (Alvin, David Hidalgo, Louie Pérez) – 5:54

== Personnel ==
- Dave Alvin – vocals, guitar
- Chris Gaffney – background vocals
- Bob Glaub – bass
- Patrick Warren – keyboards
- Don Heffington – drums, percussion
- David Piltch – bass, double bass
- Greg Leisz – guitar, slide guitar, pedal steel guitar, background vocals

== Production notes ==
- Mark Linett – engineer, mixing
- Craig Parker Adams – recording engineer
- Joe Gastwirt – mastering
- Lou Beach – design
- Issa Sharp – photography
