= Public Domain (album) =

Studio album by Dave Alvin
- Released: August 15, 2000
- Recorded: April 2000 at My Place or Yours Studio, Glendale, California
- Genre: Folk
- Length: 1:01:15
- Label: HighTone
- Producer: Dave Alvin

Dave Alvin chronology
Blackjack David (1998)	Public Domain (2000)	Out in California (2002)

In an interview with No Depression, Alvin stated that during the time of his father's terminal illness, he would go hiking in the mountains and would sing folk songs. "That gave me the idea for the Public Domain record. It finally dawned on me that those folk songs are poor people's therapy... The reason they got into the public domain was they touched a nerve. You're thrown into this world where bad things happen—tragic death and economic injustice—so how do you deal with it? Well, one way of dealing with it is in these songs. It's a way of explaining the world."

At the 43rd Annual Grammy Awards the album won the Grammy Award for Best Traditional Folk Album.

== Reception ==
Professional ratings
Aggregate scores
Source	Rating
Metacritic	82/100
Review scores
Source	Rating
AllMusic	4.5/5 stars
Entertainment Weekly	C+
Mojo	4.5/5 stars
Rolling Stone	3.5/5 stars
Tom Hull – on the Web	B−
Uncut	8/10
The Village Voice	C+

AllMusic critic Denise Sullivan wrote: "This is the work of a scholar as well as a master craftsman." Robert Christgau wrote: "If Harry Smith is what some people love about folk music, this is what other people hate about it, summed up by a title that claims humility as it sneaks presumption in the stage door—a title worthy of a brilliant record and dishonored by this dull one... It's not that these songs are all obvious or overdone—this nonfolkie had never heard a few of them. It's that they're so soft they squish even when Alvin tries to rev one past you, which usually he doesn't."

== Track listing ==
All songs traditional unless otherwise noted.

1. "Shenandoah" – 4:08
2. "Maggie Campbell Blues" – 3:26
3. "A Short Life of Trouble" – 3:41
4. "What Did the Deep Sea Say" – 3:01
5. "Engine 143" (A.P. Carter, Traditional) – 3:56
6. "Delia" – 3:38
7. "Dark Eyes" – 3:59
8. "Walk Right In" (Gus Cannon, Hosea Woods) – 3:28
9. "Murder of the Lawson Family" – 4:18
10. "Don't Let Your Deal Go Down" – 4:35
11. "Railroad Bill" – 3:27
12. "Texas Rangers" – 5:07
13. "Mama, 'Tain't Long For Day" – 3:19
14. "East Virginia Blues" – 4:17
15. "Sign of Judgment" (Kid Prince Moore) – 3:45
16. "Untitled Instrumental Track" (E. Smith) – 3:01

== Personnel ==
- Dave Alvin – vocals, guitar, National Steel guitar
- Gregory Boaz – guitar
- Greg Leisz – dobro, slide guitar, mandolin
- Rick Shea – guitar, pedal steel guitar, mandolin, backing vocals
- Brantley Kearns – fiddle, backing vocals
- John "Juke" Logan – harmonica
- Joe Terry – accordion, Harmonium, organ, piano, backing vocals
- Bobby Lloyd Hicks - drums, harmony, backing vocals

== Production notes ==
- Mark Linett – engineer, mixing
- Joe Gastwirt – mastering
- Lou Beach – design
