= The Modern Sounds of the Knitters =

Studio album by The Knitters
- Released: July 12, 2005
- Studio: Winslow Ct. Studio
- Genre: Alt country
- Length: 39:27
- Language: English
- Label: Zoë

The Knitters chronology
Poor Little Critter on the Road (1985)	The Modern Sounds of the Knitters (2005)

The Modern Sounds of the Knitters is the second album by The Knitters, released in 2005. It has received mixed critical reviews.

== Recording and release ==
The Knitters were founded in the mid-1980s by members of X and standup bassist Johnny Ray Bartel. The released Poor Little Critter on the Road in 1985 but went into hiatus after that album. The band included covers of existing Americana and folk with punk rock songs based purely on whatever sounded good to the musicians; Exene Cervenka's son requested the inclusion of "Born to Be Wild". The band reformed to tour in support of the album and continued to make sporadic appearances for years after.

== Critical reception ==
The editorial staff of AllMusic Guide gave the release four out of five stars, with reviewer Ronnie D. Lankford, Jr., singling out Cervenka and Doe's vocals, Alvin's guitar work, and the unique blending of musical genres on the album. Stephen Haag of PopMatters gave a negative review, writing that the humor falls flat on the album and while some tracks are worthwhile, it ultimately "sound[s] both like an album that took too long to release and one that was released too hastily". In The Guardian, Sylvie Simmons gave the work four out of five stars with special attention given to Cervenka and Doe's vocals.

== Track listing ==
1. "Easy Goin' Sunday" (The Knitters) – 0:35
2. "Give Me Flowers While I'm Living" (Traditional) – 2:15
3. "Try Anymore (Why Don't We Even)" (John Doe) – 2:52
4. "In This House That I Call Home" (Exene Cervenka, John Doe) – 2:22
5. "Dry River" (Dave Alvin) – 3:23
6. "Skin Deep Town" (Exene Cervenka, John Doe) – 2:26
7. "Rank Stranger" (Albert E. Brumley) – 4:10
8. "The New Call of the Wreckin' Ball" (Dave Alvin, John Doe) – 3:38
9. "Long Chain On" (Jimmy Driftwood) – 4:10
10. "I'll Go Down Swinging" (Bill Anderson) – 2:25
11. "Burning House of Love" (Exene Cervenka, John Doe) – 3:41
12. "Little Margret" (Traditional) – 3:05
13. "Born to Be Wild" (Mars Bonfire) – 4:26

== Personnel ==
The Knitters

- Dave Alvin – acoustic and electric guitars, production
- Jonny Ray Bartel – double bass, production
- D. J. Bonebrake – snare drum, production, arrangement on "Give Me Flowers While I'm Living"
- Exene Cervenka – vocals, production
- John Doe – acoustic guitar, vocals, production, arrangement on "Little Margret"

Additional personnel

- Craig Adams – recording, arrangement on "Easy Goin' Sunday"
- Diana Bonebrake – compact disc design, artwork
- Joe Gastwirt – mastering at Gastwirt Mastering
- Steven Jurgensmeyer – booklet design
- Kassel Photography – photography
- Mark Linett – mixing at Your Place or Mine Recording
