= California King =

California King may refer to:

- California King (bed), a particular size of bed
- "California King Bed", a song on Rihanna's 2010 album Loud
- California kingsnake, a nonvenomous snake commonly kept as a pet

== See also ==
- King of California, a 2007 film starring Michael Douglas and Evan Rachel Wood
- King of California (album), a 1994 album by Dave Alvin
