= Downey to Lubbock =

Studio album by Dave Alvin and Jimmie Dale Gilmore
- Released: June 1, 2018
- Length: 52:58
- Label: Yep Roc

Dave Alvin chronology
Lost Time (2015)	Downey to Lubbock (2018)	From An Old Guitar (2020)

Jimmie Dale Gilmore chronology
Heirloom Music (2011)	Downey to Lubbock (2018)

Professional ratings
Aggregate scores
Source	Rating
Metacritic	81/100
Review scores
Source	Rating
American Songwriter	4/5 stars
The Austin Chronicle	4/5 stars
Exclaim!	7/10
PopMatters	7/10
Rolling Stone	3.5/5 stars

Downey to Lubbock is a collaborative studio album by American country musicians Dave Alvin and Jimmie Dale Gilmore. It was released on June 1, 2018, by Yep Roc Records.

== Critical reception ==
Downey to Lubbock was met with "universal acclaim" reviews from critics. At Metacritic, which assigns a weighted average rating out of 100 to reviews from mainstream publications, this release received an average score of 81 based on 7 reviews.

== Track listing ==
Downey to Lubbock track listing
No.	Title	Original artist(s)	Length
1.	"Downey to Lubbock"		5:49
2.	"Silverlake"	Steve Young	5:02
3.	"Stealin', Stealin'"	Will Shade	2:59
4.	"July, You're a Woman"	John Stewart	3:53
5.	"Buddy Brown's Blues"	Lightnin' Hopkins	3:51
6.	"The Gardens"	Chris Gaffney	3:57
7.	"Get Together"	Chet Powers	3:59
8.	"K.C. Moan"		5:12
9.	"Lawdy Miss Clawdy"	Lloyd Price	2:38
10.	"Billy the Kid and Geronimo"		4:45
11.	"Deportee (Plane Wreck at Los Gatos)"	Woody Guthrie	4:53
12.	"Walk On"	Brownie McGhee	5:50

== Charts ==
Chart performance for Downey to Lubbock
Chart (2018)	Peak position
Scottish Albums (OCC)	82
UK Americana Albums (OCC)	6
UK Country Albums (OCC)	6
UK Independent Albums (OCC)	29
US Heatseekers Albums (Billboard)	2
US Independent Albums (Billboard)	12
US Top Blues Albums (Billboard)	1
US Top Country Albums (Billboard)	41
Us Top Folk Albums (Billboard)	15
