= Dave Gonzalez (guitarist) =

American singer-songwriter

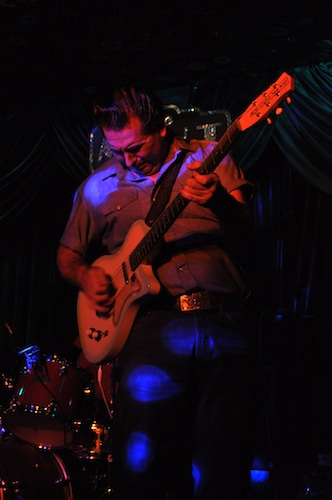
- Dave Gonzalez - Live in Concert

Background information
- Genres: Roots rock, alt-country, rock & roll, rockabilly, blues-rock, Americana

Dave Gonzalez (born April 24, 1961) is a guitarist, singer, and songwriter from Southern California and, with Thomas Yearsley, founding member of the roots rock/rockabilly band The Paladins in the early 1980s, and then co-founder with Chris Gaffney of the Hacienda Brothers.

A guitar player with a signature Fender to his credit and praised by his fellow guitar players and guitar magazines, his playing is regularly compared to Stevie Ray Vaughan's.

== Career ==
=== The Paladins ===
The Paladins were founded in the early 1980s and are still active, though sporadically so. They put out a number of studio albums, but made their reputation on the road, touring constantly in the US and abroad.

=== The Hacienda Brothers ===
In 2003 Dave Gonzalez and fellow veteran musician Chris Gaffney founded the western soul band The Hacienda Brothers. The band received critical recognition for their self-titled debut album and were nominated in 2007 for "Group of the Year" by the Americana Music Association. Their third and last album was wrapped up early 2008, but Chris Gaffney died on April 17, 2008, of liver disease. Dave Gonzalaz oversaw the final production and release of the album, Arizona Motel. In the summer of 2008, Gonzalez organized "a kind of Hacienda Brothers farewell tour as a tribute to Gaffney," with Dave Alvin as a featured guest for a show in San Francisco.

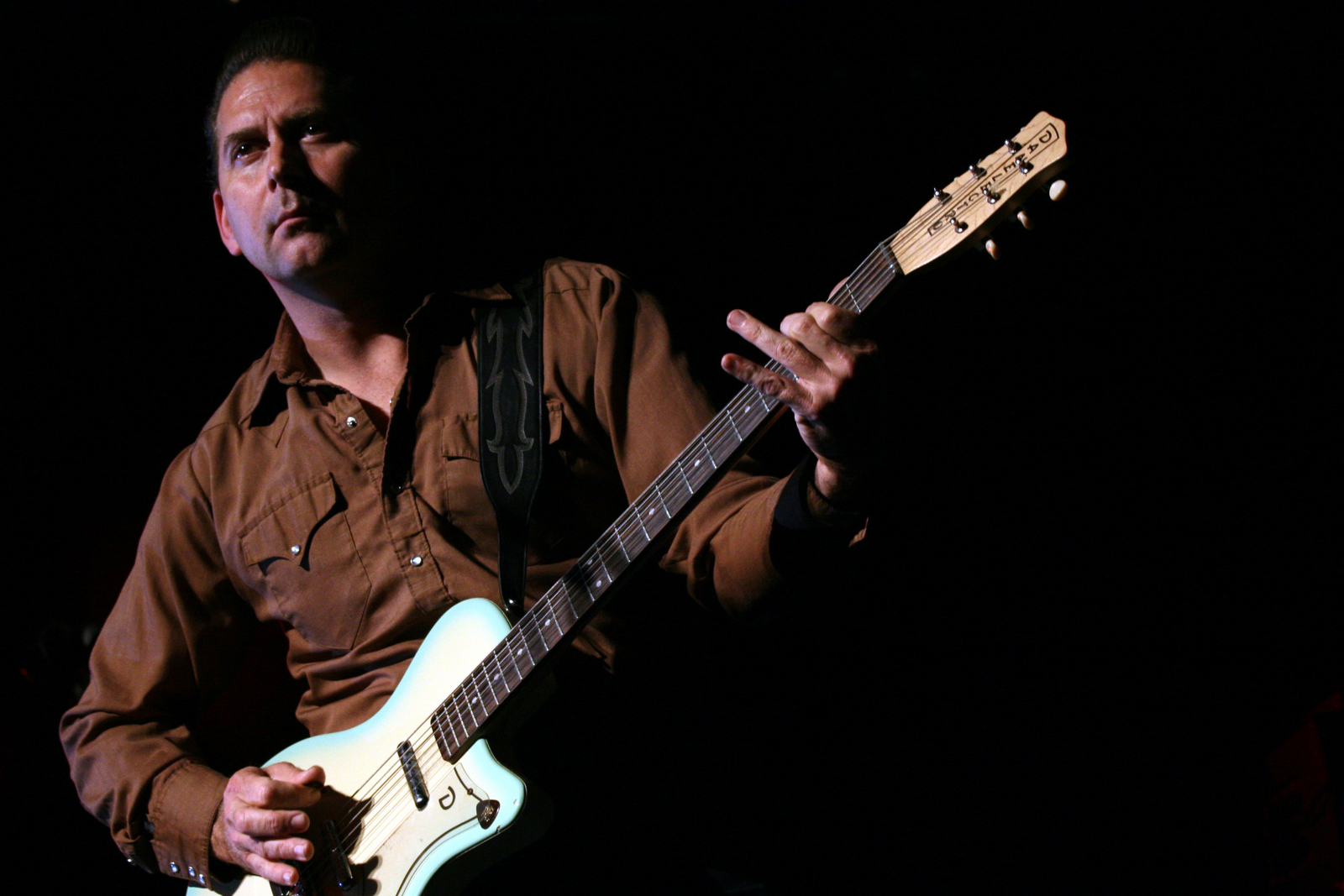
Dave Gonzalez with the Hacienda Brothers at Byron Bay Bluesfest in Australia, Easter 2007

== Guitar accolades ==
Gonzalez made the list of the "101 Forgotten Greats & Unsung Heroes" selected by Guitar Player:

A certified badass from the Southern California blues scene, Gonzales fronted the Paladins—a roots rock/rockabilly trio that gave him plenty of room to showcase his industrial-strength chops on a Guild X-550 archtop—for more than 20 years. A disciple of legendary West Coast blues guitarist Hollywood Fats—and a big fan of vintage country—Gonzales' no B.S. style reeks of everything that's cool about classic American guitar music.

=== Equipment ===
Gonzalez plays guitars that reflect his love for the 1950s: a 1953 Gibson and a 1953 Gretsch, and formerly a late-1950s Silvertone. He is endorsed by Fender, which made a Signature Model and as a nod to Gonzalez called it the Guild Paladin (X-550). It was modeled from an original 1957 Guild that Gonzalez played while with the Paladins; it had been refretted so often that, Gonzalez says, the frets "just wouldn't stay in anymore." His amplifiers with the Paladins were a Fender Bassman (with four 10" speakers) and a Fender Super Reverb, and he used an Echoplex.

After he started playing (with Chris Gaffney) in a more country-oriented style, he switched guitars, adopting a number of Fender Telecasters, including a "killer gold-sparkle Buck Owens Tele." He also plays a baritone guitar, a Fender Jazzmaster with a Fender Bass VI neck made at the Fender Custom Shop. The guitar has thick strings, from 0.14 to 0.70, and is tuned to A. He also changed amplifiers, since he played too loud for the Hacienda Brothers, and switched to a Fender Vibrolux.

== The Paladins discography ==
- 1986 - The Paladins
- 1988 - Years Since Yesterday
- 1990 - Let's Buzz
- 1994 - Ticket Home
- 1996 - Million Mile Club
- 1999 - ReJiveinated
- 1999 - Slippin In
- 2001 - Palvoline No. 7
- 2003 - El Matador
- 2007 - Power Shake Live in Holland (live DVD)
- 2008 - Hollywood Fats & The Paladins - Live 1985 (Recorded live at the Greenville Bar & Grill, Dallas Texas, December 1985)
- 2017 - New World

== Hacienda Brothers's discography ==
- 2005 - Hacienda Brothers
- 2006 - What's Wrong with Right
- 2007 - Music for Ranch & Town (Live)
- 2008 - Arizona Motel
