= Blackjack David =

Studio album by Dave Alvin
- Released: June 16, 1998
- Recorded: February – March, 1998
- Genre: Folk rock, country rock
- Length: 50:21
- Label: Hightone
- Producer: Greg Leisz

Dave Alvin chronology
Interstate City (1996)	Blackjack David (1998)	Public Domain (2000)

Blackjack David is the sixth album by the American artist Dave Alvin, released in 1998.

== Reception ==
Professional ratings
Review scores
Source	Rating
AllMusic	4/5 stars
Robert Christgau	B+

Writing for AllMusic, Janna Pendragon stated: "A Renaissance man, Dave Alvin continues to make and record music of integrity." Music critic Robert Christgau wrote: "...making the personal historical is still his metier—the border patrolman of 'California Snow', the Vietnam casualty of '1968'. He also knows how to make rootlessness historical. But I say he just likes the road."

== Track listing ==
All songs by Dave Alvin unless otherwise noted.

1. "Blackjack David" (Traditional) – 5:02
2. "Abilene" – 4:57
3. "New Highway" – 3:14
4. "California Snow" (Dave Alvin, Tom Russell) – 4:00
5. "Evening Blues" – 5:33
6. "The Way You Say Goodbye" – 4:37
7. "Mary Brown" – 4:30
8. "Laurel Lynn" – 3:36
9. "1968" (Alvin, Chris Gaffney) – 4:03
10. "From a Kitchen Table" – 5:56
11. "Tall Trees" (Alvin, Fontaine Brown) – 4:47

== Personnel ==
- Dave Alvin – vocals, guitar
- Chris Gaffney – accordion
- Dan McGough – organ
- Gregory Boaz – bass
- Bob Glaub – bass
- David Piltch – bass
- Bobby Lloyd Hicks – drums, percussion, background vocals
- Greg Leisz – guitar, lap steel guitar, mandolin, banjo, dobro, mandola, pedal steel guitar, slide guitar
- Brantley Kearns – fiddle
- Dillon O'Brian – accordion, harmonium, piano
- Doug Wieselman – clarinet, organ

== Production notes ==
- Paul DuGre – engineer, mixing
- David Ahlert – engineer
- Joe Gastwirt – mastering
- Lou Beach – design
- Kate Hoddinott – package design
- Issa Sharp – photography
- Dave Hoekstra – liner notes
