= Let's Buzz! =

Studio album by the Paladins
- Released: March 26, 1990
- Genres: Blues rock, roots rock, rockabilly
- Label: Alligator
- Producers: Steve Berlin, Mark Linett

The Paladins chronology
Years Since Yesterday (1988)	Let's Buzz! (1990)	Ticket Home (1994)

Let's Buzz! is the third album by the American band the Paladins, released on March 26, 1990. They supported it with a North American tour.

== Production ==
Produced by Steve Berlin and Mark Linett, the album was recorded at Leon Haywood's Los Angeles studio; Haywood also contributed on keyboards. Former member Scott Campbell drummed on eight of the tracks; Brian Fahey played on the rest. Lee Allen contributed on saxophone. Alligator Records forced the band to overdub some of the tracks, and remixed some without the band's consent. "I Don't Believe" is a cover of the Otis Rush song. "Kiddio" is a version of the Brook Benton song. "Follow Your Heart" was written by Ronnie Earl. The title track is a cover of the Juke Logan song. "Lawdy Lawdy Miss Mary" is a version of the Chuck Willis song. "Untamed Melody" is an instrumental.

== Critical reception ==
Professional ratings
Review scores
Source	Rating
AllMusic	4.5/5 stars
Calgary Herald	C+
The Encyclopedia of Popular Music	3/5 stars
The Grove Press Guide to the Blues on CD	4/5 stars
MusicHound Swing!: The Essential Album Guide	4/5 stars
Orlando Sentinel	5/5 stars

The Chicago Tribune noted that "the Paladins toss in touches of Texas swing, Tex-Mex conjunto and rockabilly, and their thick, meaty sound and high-energy approach breathes new life in the old styles." The Calgary Herald dismissed the album as a "generic roots rock, blues boogie effort". The Sun Sentinel said that "this sweaty roadhouse trio has recalled the pioneering age of rock with a sureness demonstrated by very few." The Province concluded that the album "takes the rockabilly trio's assault as far as it can without stepping into either ZZ Top or Stevie Ray Vaughan territory." The Orlando Sentinel stated that "[Dave] Gonzales' voice is gritty yet supple, wrapping itself fearlessly around roadhouse stompers".

== Track listing ==
No.	Title	Length
1.	"Follow Your Heart"
2.	"Keep On Lovin' Me Baby"
3.	"Let's Buzz"
4.	"I Don't Believe"
5.	"Mercy"
6.	"Untamed Melody"
7.	"What Side of the Door Am I On?"
8.	"Kiddio"
9.	"The Thing"
10.	"Lawdy Lawdy Miss Mary"
11.	"Sneakin' Around"
12.	"Playgirl"
13.	"I've Been Down Before"
