= Christy McWilson =

American singer-songwriter

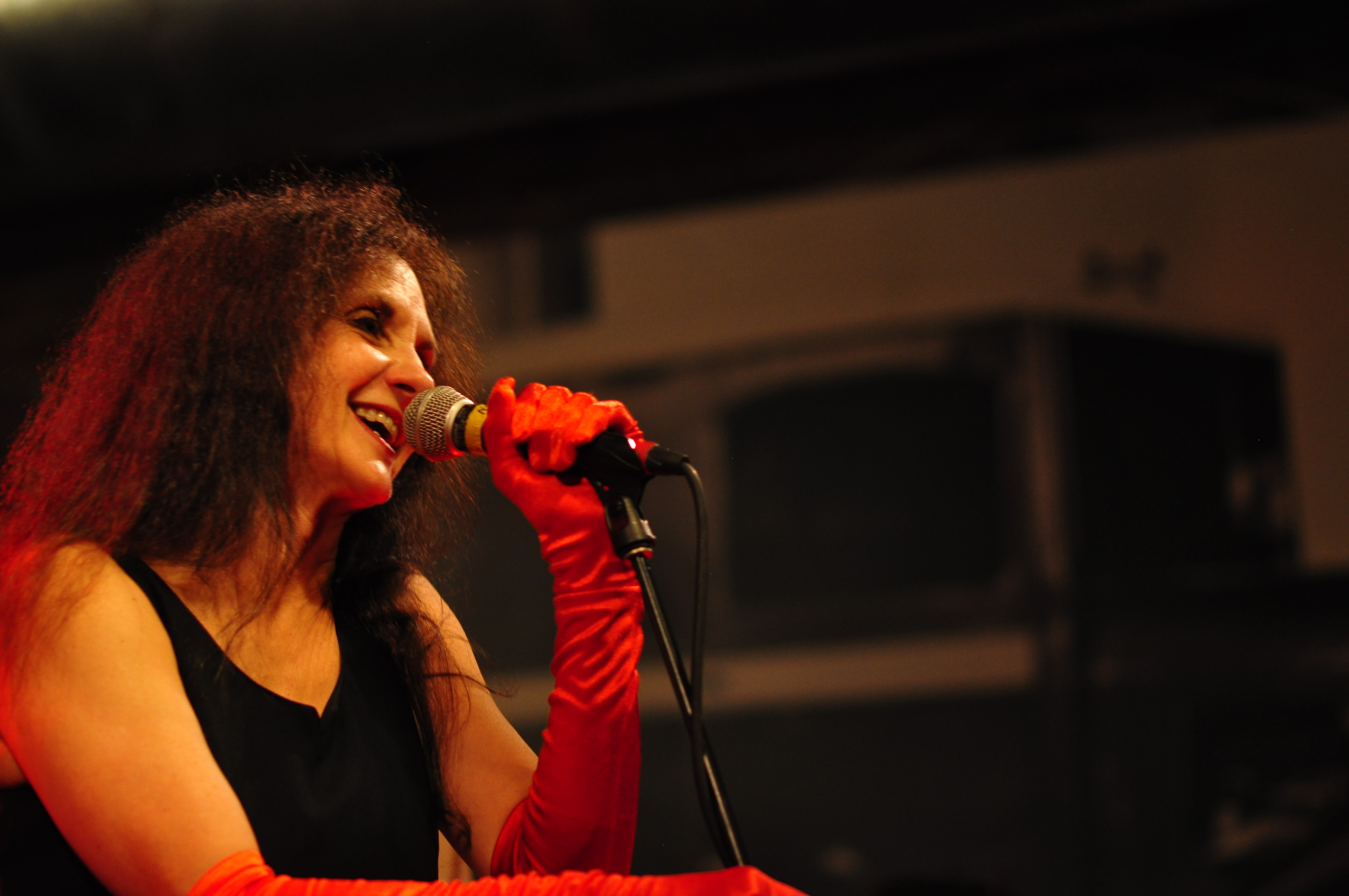
- Christy McWilson playing with Dynette Set at The Tractor in Ballard, Seattle, Washington, on December 23, 2015

Background information
- Born: Christy Wilson; California US
- Genres: Alternative country Rock music Folk music
- Occupation: Singer-songwriter
- Years active: 1980s–present
- Spouse: Scott McCaughey (div)
- Website: christymcwilson.com

Christy McWilson is an American singer-songwriter based in the Pacific Northwest. She has performed with the Dynette Set, the Picketts, as a solo artist, and with many other artists, including Dave Alvin and The Young Fresh Fellows.

== Early life ==
McWilson was born in Northern California, but spent her formative years near Downey, California. Both of her parents are musicians.

McWilson says: "I was close enough to Bakersfield to drive up and hear Merle Haggard once or twice, and was definitely, utterly, completely influenced by the Los Angeles sound of the 70s: Stone Poneys, Gram Parsons and Emmylou Harris, and Poco."

McWilson attended college in San Francisco and Sonoma, California, earning a degree in anthropology.

== Career ==
=== Early career ===
McWilson first recorded in the early 1980s as a singer with the Dynette Set, releasing an album and a few singles and compilation tracks in the first half of that decade, including "Seed of Love," a standout on the 1984 Rhino female-focused new wave compilation The Girls Can't Help It. That song was co-written and produced by Scott McCaughey who was a member of the Young Fresh Fellows.

After the demise of the Dynette Set, McWilson played around Seattle in some short-lived groups while adding backing to various albums by the Young Fresh Fellows. The Fellows' college radio hit "Amy Grant" particularly benefited from McWilson's sassy vocals.

=== Picketts ===
In 1990, McWilson helped form the Picketts (originally known as the Power Mowers) who released three albums over the course of the 1990s. Led by McWilson on vocals, the band also included drummer Leroy "Blackie" Sleep and guitarists Scott McCaughey, John Olufs, and Jim Sangster. Steve Marcus was the original bassist (later Walt Singleman played bass).

The Picketts' first recording was a 7" single for the Seattle indie PopLlama Records that featured a country version of The Clash's "Should I Stay or Should I Go." Rather than play straight-ahead country, the Picketts mixed '50s rockabilly and pop with more traditional influences, such as Wanda Jackson or Merle Haggard.

Paper Doll, their debut full-length, was released in 1992 through PopLlama. A showcase at the influential Austin music festival South by Southwest led to a deal with Rounder Records, who released The Wicked Picketts in 1995. Euphonium followed on Rounder in 1996.

The Picketts eventually disbanded, but occasionally perform reunion shows.

=== Solo work ===
As the Picketts were disbanding (more out of sloth than acrimony), longtime fan Dave Alvin approached McWilson with an offer to produce her first solo album, The Lucky One, which contains mostly original songs (many concerning her lifelong struggle with bipolar disorder) plus a cover of Brian Wilson's "Til I Die." The Lucky One was recorded with a core band that included Alvin, Peter Buck, and Rick Shea (guitars), Bob Glaub, Walter Singleman (bass), and Don Heffington (drums). The album also featured guest appearances by Syd Straw, Rhett Miller (Old 97's), and Mike Mills (R.E.M.).

Two years later, she called on many of these musicians to help put together her second solo album, Bed of Roses.

In spring of 2015, McWilson decided to release her "old new" album Desperate Girl, which was recorded in 2004 as her marriage dissolved. As she put it: "The songs, written in the weeks leading up to and during the marriage's demise, were recorded in their full red-hot splendor. At the time it was so painful I shelved and tried to forget about it. I recently rediscovered it and realized I had an amazing portrait of that heightened time of my life."

=== Other projects ===
McWilson also routinely participates on the Roots On The Rails tour with Dave Alvin, Cindy Cashdollar, and other artists.

McWilson's most recent recording is Six by Three, with the West Seattle 2 (drummer Blackie Sleep and bassist Walt Singleman).

== Personal life ==
McWilson and singer-songwriter Scott McCaughey (The Young Fresh Fellows, The Minus 5) met at San Francisco State University and moved to Seattle in 1980, eventually marrying and having a child together. The couple are no longer married.

McWilson said she prefixed her birth surname, Wilson, with "Mc" to create her stage name, McWilson.

== Discography ==
=== Dynette Set ===
Year	Title	Label	Type	Producer
1983	Rockers and Recliners	Wolf Records WR-8310	Vinyl	Jim Wolfe

=== Picketts ===
Full-Length Albums
Year	Title	Label	Type	Producer
1992	Paper Doll	Popllama PLCC68	CD, vinyl	Conrad Uno; Jimmy Sangster; John Olufs
1995	The Wicked Picketts	Rounder CD 9046	CD, vinyl	Conrad Uno
1996	Euphonium	Rounder CD 9056	CD, vinyl	Steve Berlin

Singles and EPs
Year	Title	Label	Type	Tracks
1990	The Picketts	Popllama PL7-34	Single	A1) Should I Stay or Should I Go? B1) Walkin' Talkin' Jukebox; B2) Fallin' for You
1994	Pick It !!	Cruddy CR-07	EP	A1) Sukiyaki; A2) Stella Stomp; B1) Party Hat; B2) Remington Ride
1996	Baba O'Riley	Rounder CD PR 1074	CD single	A1) Baba o'Riley

=== Solo releases ===
Year	Title	Label	Type	Producer
2000	The Lucky One	Hightone HCD 8119	CD, vinyl	Dave Alvin
2002	Bed of Roses	Hightone HCD8143	CD, vinyl	Dave Alvin
2015	Desperate Girl	Sally Ann Records	CD	Kurt Bloch

=== Dave Alvin and Guilty Women ===
Year	Title	Label	Type	Producer
2005	Dave Alvin and the Guilty Women	Yep Roc YEP 2155	CD, vinyl	Dave Alvin

=== The Granvilles ===
Year	Title	Label	Type	Producer
2009	Martini's Mansion	No label	CDR	Jim Sangster, John Sangster

=== The West Seattle 2 ===
Year	Title	Label	Type	Producer
2016	Six by Three	Sally Ann Records	CD	John Sangster

=== Other contributions ===
Year	Artist	Title	Label	Christy's Contributions
2013	Jasper T	The Sweet Dark, Pt. 1	N/A	Track 4, "Long for You"
2011	Maggie Björklund	Coming Home	Bloodshot BS 174	Composer, lyricist
2011	Dave Alvin	Eleven Eleven	Yep Rock YEP 2246	Piano & vocals on track 9, "Manzanita"
2010	Various Artists	Through a Faraway Window: A Tribute to Jimmy Silva	SteadyBoy SB-0030	Track 9, "Man of the Cloth"
2010	Various Artists	Mississippi Sheiks Tribute; Concert: Live Vancouver	Black Hen BHCD 0066	Duet with Dave Alvin on track 13, "Who's Been Here"
2009	Michael Shuler	Edge of the World	Brave Feet BF 12	Vocals
2009	Various Artists	It Crawled from the Basement: Green Monkey Records Anthology	Green Monkey; PWGM 10012CD	Background Vocals
2007	Jesse Sykes	Like, Love, Lust and the Open Halls of the Soul	Barsuk BARK-62	Background Vocals
2006	Mudhoney	Under a Billion Suns	Sub Pop SP 700	Vocals
2006	Dave Alvin	West of the West	Yep Roc YEP 2118	Vocals
2005	Rick Shea	Bound for Trouble	Tres Pescadores 6	Vocals, duet
2005	Various Artists	Lowe Profile: A Tribute to Nick Lowe	Brewery 0942	Duet with Rick Shea on track 11, "Never Been in Love"
2004	Various Artists	This One's for the Fellows	BlueDisguise 6	Duet with John Ramberg on track 10, "Celebration"
2003	Minus 5	Down with Wilco	Yep Roc 2052	Guest artist
2003	The Minus 5	I Don't Know Who I Am (Let the War; Against Music Begin, Vol. 2)	Return To Sender 43	Musician
2003	Model Rockets	Pilot County Suite	Book Records 6	Assistant
2002	Various Artists	This Is Where I Belong: The Songs; Of Ray Davies & The Kinks	Rykodisc VACK 1232	With The Minus 5 on track 12, "Get Back in Line"
1998	The Squirrels	Scrapin' for Hits	Popllama 81296	Vocals
1997	The Minus 5	The Lonesome Death of Buck McCoy	Hollywood HT-62115-2	Performer
1996	Various Artists	Bite Back: Live at the Crocodile Cafe	Popllama 2200	Vocals, composer
1994	The Squirrels	Harsh Toke of Reality	Popllama 91293	Background vocals
1994	Various Artists	Love Is My Only Crime: Part 2	Veracity IRS CD 973.402	With the Picketts on track 2, "Ring or a Prayer"
1994	Larry Barrett	Beyond The Mississippi	GlitterhouseGRCD 342	Vocals on track 2 "Like A Ring" and track 4, "Take My Troubles Back"
1991	Fastbacks	Never Fails, Never Works	Blaster! BLATLP3	Background vocals
1990	The Squirrels	What Gives?	Popllama 2523	Background vocals
1985	The Young Fresh Fellows	Fabulous Sounds of the Pacific Northwest	East Side Digital	Vocals
1989	Scott McCaughey	My Chartreuse Opinion	East Side Digital 80382	Vocals, harmonies
1989	The Young Fresh Fellows	This One's for the Ladies	Frontier FRO 31034CD	Background vocals
1987	The Young Fresh Fellows	The Men Who Loved Music	Frontier 4611-2-L13	Vocals
1985	The Young Fresh Fellows	Fabulous Sounds of the Pacific Northwest	East Side Digital	Vocals
1984	The Young Fresh Fellows	Topsy Turvy	East Side Digital	Vocals
1984	Various Artists	The Girls Can't Help It – A Modern Girl Group Compilation	Rhino RNLP 024	With the Dynette Set on Track 6, "Seed of Love"
1983	Various Artists	Seattle Syndrome Two	EngramENG 012	With the Dynette Set on track 4, "Tell Me What You Want"
