= Spinning Coin =

Studio album by John Mayall
- Released: 1995
- Recorded: 1995
- Genre: Blues
- Length: 49:04
- Label: Silvertone
- Producer: R.S. Field, Dave McNair

John Mayall chronology
The 1982 Reunion Concert (1994)	Spinning Coin (1995)	Blues for the Lost Days (1997)

Professional ratings
Review scores
Source	Rating
The Penguin Guide to Blues Recordings	3/4 stars

Spinning Coin is a studio album by the British bluesman John Mayall and The Bluesbreakers.

== Track listing ==
All tracks composed by John Mayall; except where indicated

1. "When the Devil Starts Crying" (Jim Lauderdale)
2. "Spinning Coin"
3. "Ain't No Brakeman" (Fontaine Brown)
4. "Double Life Feelings"
5. "Run"
6. "What Passes for Love" (David Grissom)
7. "Fan the Flames" (John "Juke" Logan)
8. "Voodoo Music" (Willie Dixon, J.B. Lenoir)
9. "Long Story Short" (Michael Henderson, R.S. Field)
10. "No Big Hurry"
11. "Remember This"

== Personnel ==
The Bluesbrakers

- John Mayall - vocals; harmonica (tracks 1–3, 9), 12-string guitar (track 2), Hammond organ (track 3, 5, 6), electric piano (track 3), synthesizers (track 4, 5), piano (track 4, 5, 7, 10, 11), rhythm guitar (track 8), lead guitar (track 8), church organ (track 11)
- Buddy Whittington - lead guitar (tracks 1, 3–7, 11), rhythm guitar (track 3–8, 11), acoustic guitar (track 1, 2, 10)
- Rick Cortes - bass (tracks 1–9, 11)
- Joe Yuele - drums (tracks 1–9, 11), tribal drum track (track 5), washboard (track 10)

Additional musicians

- Joe Sublett - saxophones (tracks 1, 5, 7–9, 11)
- John "Juke" Logan - electric harmonica (track 7)
- R.S. Field - percussion (tracks 3, 9), guitar (track 9)
- Dave McNair - percussion (track 3)

Transcribed from an original album cover.
