= Interstate City =

Live album by Dave Alvin
- Released: July 1996
- Venue: Continental Club, Austin, Texas
- Genre: Folk rock, country rock
- Length: 1:11:12
- Label: Hightone
- Producer: Dave Alvin

Dave Alvin chronology
King of California (1994)	Interstate City (1996)	Blackjack David (1998)

Interstate City is a live album by American artist Dave Alvin and the Guilty Men, released in 1996. It was the group's first release and one of two the group released with Hightone records.

== Reception ==
Professional ratings
Review scores
Source	Rating
Allmusic	4/5 stars
Robert Christgau	(choice cut)

Writing for Allmusic, music critic Thom Owens wrote of the album "Most of the newer numbers are on par with his finest material and they are delivered with an intoxicating rush. Interstate City is one of the rare live albums that actually improves on the original recordings."

== Track listing ==
All songs by Dave Alvin unless otherwise noted.

1. "So Long Baby, Goodbye" – 3:26
2. "Out in California" (Dave Alvin, Tom Russell) – 4:26
3. "Interstate City" – 6:21
4. "Look Out (It Must Be Love)/Intro to Mister Lee" – 4:21
5. "Mister Lee" (Alvin, Fontaine Brown) – 5:04
6. "Thirty Dollar Room" (Alvin, David Amy) – 6:29
7. "Dry River" – 4:10
8. "Museum of Heart" – 4:34
9. "Waiting for the Hard Times to Go" (Jim Ringer) – 3:37
10. "Jubilee Train/Do Re Mi/Promised Land" – 9:15
11. "Long White Cadillac" – 7:43
12. "The New Florence Avenue Lullaby" – 2:28
13. "Romeo's Escape" – 8:58

== Personnel ==
- Dave Alvin – vocals, guitar
- Rick Solem – piano, background vocals
- Gregory Boaz – bass
- Bobby Lloyd Hicks – drums, percussion, background vocals
- Donald Lindley – drums, percussion, background vocals
- Greg Leisz – guitar, lap steel guitar, mandolin
- Katy Moffatt – vocals
- Ted Roddy – harmonica

== Production notes ==
- James Tuttle – engineer, mixing
- Phil Crumrine – assistant engineer
- Chris Bellman – mastering
- Lou Beach – design
- Issa Sharp – photography
- Brenda Burns Boaz – photography
