= The Knitters =

Band

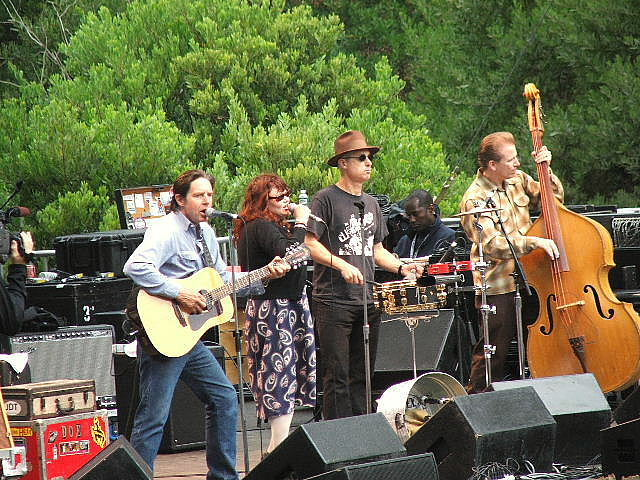
- The band onstage at an outdoor concert in 2005

Background information
- Origin: Los Angeles, California, U.S.
- Genres: Country; rockabilly; folk; cowpunk
- Years active: 1985–present
- Labels: Slash
- Spinoff of: X; The Blasters; The Red Devils; The Flesh Eaters
- Members: Exene Cervenka; John Doe; DJ Bonebrake; Dave Alvin; Jonny Ray Bartel

The Knitters are a Los Angeles-based band who play country, rockabilly and folk music. The Knitters' name is a play on the name of the folk group The Weavers.

== Background ==
The Knitters formed in 1982 as a side project to the band members' primary commitments. Vocalist Exene Cervenka, singer/bassist John Doe and drummer DJ Bonebrake were three of the four members of the punk band X; guitarist Dave Alvin was a member of roots rock band The Blasters as well as The Flesh Eaters; and stand-up bassist Jonny Ray Bartel was a member of blues-rock band The Red Devils.

The Knitters' debut album Poor Little Critter on the Road was released in 1985. It included mainly traditional and cover songs, together with some X songs performed in an acoustic style. The album drew on blues, folk, country and rockabilly influences. In 1999, the label Bloodshot Records released a track-by-track tribute to the album entitled Poor Little Knitter on the Road.

After the debut album's release, all the group members continued to work with their primary bands. Dave Alvin also later pursued a solo career.

Twenty years later, in 2005, the group released their second and ironically-titled album, The Modern Sounds of the Knitters. John Doe has been quoted as saying "The Knitters, like their music, don't do anything hasty. Since our last record's been out for a while and it did pretty good, we figured it was just about time to put out another." The Modern Sounds of the Knitters has been well received by critics.

It's like if the guys at Sun Records dropped LSD and made a record with Lead Belly and the Carter Family. That's what The Knitters sound like.

—Dave Alvin

In March 2024 during the South by Southwest festival, the Knitters reunited for one performance in Austin, Texas, as part of an all-day concert in memory of Mojo Nixon.

== Discography ==
- Poor Little Critter on the Road (1985) – US No. 204
- The Modern Sounds of the Knitters (2005)

== Reviews ==
- Klinge, Steve (August 12, 2005). "These critters are punk, country, "anything goes"". Philadelphia Inquirer.
- "The Modern Sounds Of The Knitters". Blogcritics –. Archived from the original on February 25, 2006.
- "Review of The Modern Sounds Of The Knitters". Rhino. Archived from the original on June 9, 2007.
