= Dave Alvin and the Guilty Women =

Studio album by Dave Alvin
- Released: May 26, 2009
- Genre: Folk rock, country rock
- Length: 52:05
- Label: Yep Roc
- Producer: Dave Allen

Dave Alvin chronology
West of the West (2006)	Dave Alvin and the Guilty Women (2009)	Eleven Eleven (2011)

Dave Alvin and the Guilty Women is an album by American artist Dave Alvin, released in 2009. It reached number 35 on the Top Independent Albums chart.

== Reception ==
Professional ratings
Review scores
Source	Rating
Allmusic	4/5 stars
Robert Christgau	(choice cut)
PopMatters	(8/10)

Writing for Allmusic, music critic Mark Deming called the album "an album that often comes out of pain, but it also speaks of joy, perseverance, and the acceptance of the mysteries of life, and Dave's collaborators make this little miracle come to life as much as he does. It's something they can all point to with pride." Ben Childs of PopMatters wrote "The sound here isn’t a radical departure from Alvin’s recent work; he still works within broad templates of Americanisms: folk ballads, rock ‘n’ roll, jump blues. Frequently, the music alternates between up-tempo shuffles and somber ballads, with songs nicely rounded by the backing vocals of his band-mates and filled with sweetened fiddle lines and liquid guitar figures propped up by delicate brush and snare percussion."

== Track listing ==
All songs by Dave Alvin unless otherwise noted.

1. "Marie Marie" – 3:29
2. "California's Burning" – 5:06
3. "Downey Girl" – 5:08
4. "Weight of the World" (Christy McWilson) – 3:27
5. "Anyway" (Dave Alvin, Amy Farris) – 3:49
6. "Boss of the Blues" – 4:20
7. "Potter's Field" (Christy McWilson) – 3:42
8. "River Under the Road" (Jimmie Dale Gilmore) – 3:38
9. "These Times We're Living In" – 4:42
10. "Nana and Jimi" – 3:22
11. "Don't Make Promises" (Tim Hardin) – 6:39
12. "Que Sera, Sera (Whatever Will Be, Will Be)" (Jay Livingston, Ray Evans) – 4:43

== Personnel ==
- Dave Alvin – vocals, guitar, National Steel guitar
- Marcia Ball – piano
- Cindy Cashdollar – guitar, lap steel guitar, National Steel guitar, Weissenborn
- Amy Farris – viola, violin, vocal harmony
- Nina Gerber – guitar
- Laurie Lewis – mandolin, violin, vocal harmony
- Christy McWilson – vocal harmony, vocals on "Potter's Field"
- Lisa Pankratz – drums, percussion
- Suzy Thompson – accordion

== Production notes ==
- Sam Seifert – engineer
- Mark Linett – engineer, mixing, mastering
- Michael Triplett – design
- Nancy Sefton – art direction
- Todd V. Wolfson – photography
- Amy Ferris – orchestration
