= Blue Blvd =

Studio album by Dave Alvin
- Released: August 20, 1991
- Genre: Folk rock, country rock
- Length: 48:26
- Label: Hightone
- Producer: Chris Silogyi, Bruce Bromberg, Dave Alvin

Dave Alvin chronology
Romeo's Escape (1987)	Blue Blvd (1991)	Museum of Heart (1993)

Blue Blvd is an album by American musician Dave Alvin. It was released in 1991.

== Production ==
Alvin worked on the songs over a period of years after the release of his first solo album, in 1987. He dealt with health issues, worked on film soundtracks, and helped other musicians. The album employed a fuller production sound than Alvin's previous album, Romeo's Escape, courtesy of Alvin, Chris Silagyi, and Bruce Bromberg.

== Reception ==
Professional ratings
Review scores
Source	Rating
AllMusic	3/5 stars
Robert Christgau	(3-star Honorable Mention)
The Encyclopedia of Popular Music	3/5 stars
MusicHound Rock: The Essential Album Guide	4/5 stars
The Rolling Stone Album Guide	2.5/5 stars

AllMusic critic Denise Sullivan wrote: "The only thing that mars this wonderful, rootsy singer/songwriter album is a heavy production hand and a drum sound attempting to give it a rock edge; consequently, some of the more beautiful songs like the title track suffer under the weight, but the final cut, 'Dry River,' is alone worth the price of the disc." The Washington Post called the album "11 songs so emotionally compelling and finely crafted that they remind one of Raymond Carver's short stories." The Spin Alternative Record Guide wrote that it "offers some idiosyncratic gems." Trouser Press wrote that Alvin's "no-frills singing sometimes fails to hold the spotlight, especially when the backing players crank up."

== Track listing ==
All songs by Dave Alvin.

1. "Blue Blvd" – 4:53
2. "Guilty Man" – 4:36
3. "Haley's Comet" – 4:21
4. "Why Did She Stay with Him" – 4:20
5. "Rich Man's Town" – 3:56
6. "Gospel Night" – 4:50
7. "Plastic Rose" – 4:18
8. "Brand New Heart" – 3:36
9. "Wanda and Duane" – 3:57
10. "Andersonville" – 5:45
11. "Dry River" – 3:54

== Personnel ==
- Dave Alvin – vocals, guitar
- Don Falzone – bass
- Rick Solem – piano, organ
- Bobby Lloyd Hicks – drums
- Donald Lindley – drums
- Greg Leisz – guitar, mandolin, lap steel guitar, pedal steel guitar
- Lee Allen – tenor saxophone
- Dwight Yoakam – background vocals
- David Hidalgo – background vocals
- Terry Evans – background vocals
- Katy Moffatt – background vocals

Production

- Chris Silagyi – producer
- Bruce Bromberg – producer
- Dave Alvin – producer
- Michael Becker – engineer
- Steve Shepherd – engineer
- Paul DuGre – engineer
- Geza X – engineer
- Steve Klein – mixing
- Bernie Grundman – mastering
- Terri Lande Bromberg – design
- Beth Herzhaft – photography
