= Rick Shea =

American singer-songwriter and guitarist (born 1953)

- Born: Richard Denis Shea; 1953 (age 72–73); Annapolis, Maryland, U.S.
- Origin: San Bernardino, California, U.S.
- Genres: Americana
- Occupations: Singer, songwriter, producer, musician, performer
- Instruments: Acoustic guitar, electric guitar, pedal steel, mandolin, vocals
- Years active: 1971-present
- Label: TRES PESCADORES
- Website: www.rickshea.com

Rick Shea (born September 22, 1953) is an American singer-songwriter and guitarist who lives in Southern California. His career spans four decades and in that time he has worked as a solo artist and with bands such as Chris Gaffney and The Cold Hard Facts and Dave Alvin's Guilty Men. Additionally, Shea fronts his own band, the Losin' End. His influences are many and include the hardcore honky of Hank Williams as well as a myriad of American artists and international folk musicians. Eclectic in his stance, his live shows entice audiences across the United States and Europe. He has released ten albums and continues to write, record and produce both his own music and that of other artists.

== Early life ==
Shea was born in Annapolis, Maryland to a military family and lived in several eastern states before moving to San Bernardino, California at age eleven. As a teenager, he began playing in local coffeehouses and before long, many of the country bars and honky-tonks in the area.

== Musical career ==
Shea draws inspiration from the folk, country, blues, and rock genres and has been compared to Tom Russell, Jimmie Dale Gilmore and Chuck Pyle among others. As a solo artist, he has played at The Strawberry Festival in Sonora, California, The Canmore Folk Festival in Alberta Canada, The Honolulu Academy of Arts in Hawaii, and is a regular on the "Roots on the Rails" series of concerts along with his partner in crime, Dave Alvin, as well as many other Folk and Americana venues and festivals.

In 1992, Shea was included in the Town South of Bakersfield series of albums that featured Dwight Yoakam, Lucinda Williams, and Rosie Flores among others. Later, in 2001, Shea collaborated with fiddler Brantley Kearns on an album of original and cover songs called Trouble and Me. Shea arranged and co-produced the album with Dave Alvin.

In 2003, Shea worked with country singer Patty Booker on an album of country duets called Our Shangri LA. The album featured original and cover songs by Merle Haggard, Leona Williams, Pat McLaughlin, Lee Hazlewood and others. Shea has played with Dave Alvin on his Grammy Award-winning album Public Domain and with R.E.M. for the soundtrack to Man On the Moon.

Shea has worked as a producer on his own albums and plays acoustic, electric, and steel guitar, and mandolin. He is revered as a master Telecaster player, and performs regularly in Southern California with his group, consisting of sidemen David Hallgrimson on bass, noted percussionist Steve Mugalian., and session whiz Stephen Patt. Besides his own albums, Shea has also produced albums for The Good Intentions from Liverpool and Chris Richards from Sheboygan, Wisconsin.

== Discography ==
- Outside of Nashville (1989)
- A Town South of Bakersfield (1992)
- The Buffalo Show (1993)
- Shaky Ground (1998)
- Sawbones (1999)
- Trouble and Me (2001)
- Our Shangri LA (2003)
- Bound for Trouble (2005)
- Shelter Valley Blues (2009)
- Sweet Bernardine (2013)
- The Town Where I Live (2017)
- Love & Desperation (2020)
