= Donald Lindley =

American drummer

Donald Lindley (1951 – February 3, 1999), nicknamed "The Clock" for his precise rhythmic sense, was an American drummer, noted for his work with Lucinda Williams, Rosie Flores, Joe Ely and several other country and Americana artists.

Lindley was born in Phoenix, Arizona in 1951. He lived in various parts of the US before settling in Austin, Texas in 1993. He died of lung cancer in 1999, leaving behind a wife and young son.

== Credits ==
- So Rebellious a Lover – Carla Olson (1987)
- Lucinda Williams – Lucinda Williams (1988)
- Child Bride – Katy Moffatt (1989)
- Blue Blvd – Dave Alvin (1991)
- Just Like Old Times – Heather Myles (1992)
- Sweet Old World – Lucinda Williams (1992)
- Bone – Marvin Etzioni (1992)
- After the Farm – Rosie Flores (1992)
- Return of the Hellecasters – The Hellecasters (1993)
- Orphans and Angels – Julie Miller (1993)
- Once More With Feeling – Rosie Flores (1993)
- Museum of Heart – Dave Alvin (1993)
- Pretty Close to the Truth – Jim Lauderdale (1994)
- King of California – Dave Alvin (1994)
- Your Love and Other Lies – Buddy Miller (1995)
- Rockabilly Filly – Rosie Flores (1995)
- Loser's Paradise – Chris Gaffney (1995)
- Full Circle – Ted Roddy (1995)
- Every Second Counts – Jim Lauderdale (1995)
- The Devil Lied to Me – Country Dick Montana (1996)
- Sayin' What I'm Thinkin' – Sarah Brown (1996)
- Honky Tonk Reprise – Rosie Flores (1996)
- Poison Love – Buddy Miller (1997)
- Blue Pony – Julie Miller (1997)
- Twistin' in the Wind – Joe Ely (1998)
- Car Wheels on a Gravel Road – Lucinda Williams (1998)
- Low Down and Up – Toni Price (1999)
- Dance Hall Dreams – Rosie Flores (1999)
- Comfort in the Curves – Max Stalling (1999)
