= The Paladins =

Rockabilly music group

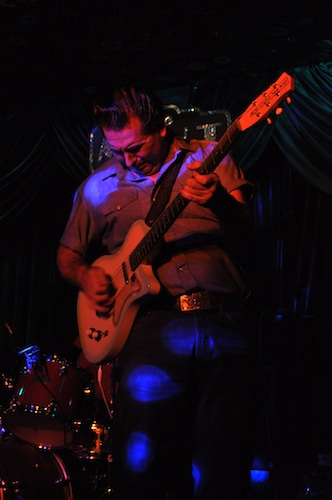
- Dave Gonzalez of The Paladins - Live in Concert

Background information
- Genres: Roots rock, rockabilly, rock & roll, blues rock, Americana
- Years active: 1980–2005, 2014
- Label: Alligator Records
- Members: Dave Gonzalez, Brian Fahey, Thomas Yearsley
- Past members: Whit Broadly, Jeff Donovan, Joey Jazdzewski, Scott B. Campbell
- Website: https://www.paladinsband.com/

The Paladins are an American roots rock-rockabilly band from San Diego, California. Founded in the early 1980s by guitarist Dave Gonzalez and his high school friend and double bass player Thomas Yearsley, they have recorded nine studio albums and built a reputation as a hard-working live band.

== Early years ==
The Paladins started out as a rockabilly band during the rockabilly craze of the early 1980s. Their tagline at the time was "Western & Bop", as they played a combination of rockabilly and vintage country. Their lead singer and rhythm guitarist was Whit Broadly. With this lineup they did their first recording, a contribution to a 1982 local compilation album, Who's Listening?, and a song two years later on The Best of L.A. Rockabilly, a 1984 Rhino Records LP. Their first LP, The Paladins, was produced by Kim Wilson of the Fabulous Thunderbirds and was released in 1987 on Wrestler Records. Their second album, Years Since Yesterday, produced by Los Lobos' Steve Berlin and Mark Linnet, was released on Alligator Records in 1989 and had sold more than 20,000 copies by the end of the year; the band shot a music video for the title song at the Belly Up Tavern in Solana Beach, California for $30,000. Spending most of their time on the road, by 1989 they had already toured with Stevie Ray Vaughan, Los Lobos, The Blasters and the Fabulous Thunderbirds. They toured abroad as well; in the summer of 1989, between recording sessions for the third album, they played in Europe for the month of June, including shows at the Peer Music Festival in Belgium and the World Music Festival in London.

== 1990s ==
In 1990 the Paladins released their third record, Let's Buzz!, "an invigorating blend of rockabilly, blues, rhythm-and-blues and country" recorded in the Los Angeles studio of 1970s soul star Leon Haywood (who also played keyboards on the album), produced again by Steve Berlin and Mark Linnet and released by Alligator. Acclaim came with a nomination at the 1990 Entertainer Music Awards (San Diego County) for Best Rock 'n' Roll, Original Music, for which they were a critics' favorite (they lost out to Beat Farmers). They won the award two years later, a year after winning the San Diego Music Awards. Touring continued relentlessly at home and abroad; in 1991, for instance, they toured Australia for three weeks. Shows were reviewed as fun, lively performances where band members would solo, swap instruments and even occasionally encourage audience members to play instruments.

== 2000s ==
The Paladins appeared to have come to an end in 2004 when Gonzalez wanted to focus on different musical interests after having formed an alt-country band Hacienda Brothers. Thereafter a number of live albums and a live DVD were released with the band sometimes described as being "on hiatus."

While touring with his current band, the Stone River Boys, Gonzalez joined Thomas Yearsley and Brian Fahey at the Ink & Iron Festival in Long Beach, California in June 2011 for a Paladins reunion concert, the band's first US concert since 2005. The Paladins have reconnected, recorded new songs for an upcoming album, and have recently released a "Paladins - Best Of" album. As of 2026 they recently toured throughout Europe and are still actively doing dates with members Gonzalez, Yearsley & Fahey.

== Line-up ==
=== Current members ===
- Dave Gonzalez – guitar and vocals
- Brian Fahey – drums
- Thomas Yearsley – bass and vocals

=== Former members ===
- Whit Broadly – vocals, guitar (1980–1982)
- Gus Griffin – drums
- Jeff Donovan – drums
- Scott Campbell – drums (1983–1990)
- Joey Jazdzewski – bass

== Discography ==
- Paladins (LP/Cassette, Wrestler Records WR1687, 1987; CD, 1990)
- Years Since Yesterday (LP/Cassette, Alligator Records, 1988; CD, 1990)
- Let's Buzz! (LP/CD, Alligator Records, 1990)
- Ticket Home (CD, Sector 2 Records, 1994, produced by Los Lobos' Cesar Rosas)
- Million Mile Club (CD/MP3, 4AD Records, 1996)
- ReJiveinated (CD, Foil Records/Hootenanny Records, 1999) (reissue of Ticket Home + 4 additional tracks)
- Slippin In (CD, Ruf Records, 1999)
- Palvoline No. 7 (CD, Ruf Records, 2001)
- El Matador (CD, Lux Records, 2003)
- Power Shake: Live in Holland (27 June 2004; 2CD, Rounder Records, 2007)
- Power Shake: Live in Holland (27 June 2004; DVD, Rounder Records, 2007)
- Live 1985 (Hollywood Fats & The Paladins) (CD, Top Cat Records, 2008)
- Wicked (7-inch 45 rpm single, Lux Records, 2013)
- More of the Best of, Vol. 1 (CD, Lux Records, 2014)
- Slippin' In Ernesto's (CD/2LP, Music Machine Records, 2016)
- New World (CD/LP, Lux Records, 2017)
