= The Rose of Roscrae =

Studio album by Tom Russell
- Released: April 13, 2015
- Genre: Country
- Length: 2:29:08
- Label: Proper

Tom Russell chronology
Aztec Jazz (2013)	The Rose of Roscrae (2015)

Professional ratings
Aggregate scores
Source	Rating
Metacritic	82/100
Review scores
Source	Rating
AllMusic	4.5/5 stars

The Rose of Roscrae is a studio album by American musician Tom Russell. It was released in April 2015 under Proper Records. The misspelling of Roscrea is apparently intentional.

== Track listing ==
Disc One
No.	Title	Length
1.	"Overture"	2:56
2.	"This Is The Last Frontier"	1:13
3.	"Guilty"	5:38
4.	"Sam Hall"	0:59
5.	"The Rose of Roscrae"	5:33
6.	"Hair Trigger Heart"	5:04
7.	"He'll Be Dead Before He Hits the Ground"	1:20
8.	"You Gotta Have A Dance"	2:41
9.	"Ain't No More Cane On The Brazos"	3:18
10.	"The Last Running"	5:32
11.	"Home On The Range/America"	1:13
12.	"Just A Closer Walk" (featuring Augie Blood)	2:24
13.	"Cowboy Voices Beyond The Campfire"	2:01
14.	"He Wasn't A Bad Kid, When He Was Sober"	4:43
15.	"The Sidekick's Last Testament"	2:15
16.	"Johnny's Campfire Soliloquy #1"	1:36
17.	"The Unfortunate Rake/The Streets of Laredo"	1:48
18.	"The Hands of Damien"	2:17
19.	"This Is The Last Frontier"	1:41
20.	"The Water Is Wide"	4:33
21.	"The Fairground Pugilist"	1:31
22.	"Campfire Soliloquy #3"	1:07
23.	"Campfire Ghosts/Cowboy Voices"	2:16
24.	"Crazy Horse/Custers Luck"	2:43
25.	"Johnny Behind-the-Deuce #2 Molokai"	1:28
26.	"She Talks To God"	3:21
27.	"Rock of Ages/Gunpowder Sunset Overture"	2:52

Disc Two
No.	Title	Length
1.	"The Water Is Wide/Overture"	2:33
2.	"I Talk To God"	3:13
3.	"The Bear"	2:53
4.	"The Railroad Boy"	1:04
5.	"Resurrection Mountain"	3:46
6.	"When The Wolves No Longer Sing"	2:59
7.	"Just A Closer Walk With Thee/The Gospel of John, Chapter 4"	2:34
8.	"Jesus Met The Woman At The Well"	2:37
9.	"Damien (A Crust of Bread, A Slice of Fish, A Cup of Water)"	5:21
10.	"Guadalupe/Valentine de la Sierra"	4:22
11.	"Poor Mother Mexico"	1:20
12.	"Gallo del Cielo"	1:33
13.	"Soliloquy #1/Swiss Yodel Choir"	1:51
14.	"En Canadien Errant"	1:09
15.	"He'll Be Dead Before He Hits The Ground #2"	1:32
16.	"Doin' Hard Time In Texas"	3:14
17.	"When I Was A Cowboy aka Western Cowboy"	1:55
18.	"West Texas Montage"	4:25
19.	"Old Rattlebag Blues (Soliloquy #2)"	2:35
20.	"Midnight Wine"	5:22
21.	"Whiskey In His Blood"	2:31
22.	"Tularosa"	3:50
23.	"Irish Medley/The Stable"	4:51
24.	"Isn't It Grand?"	1:48
25.	"The Rose of Roscrae"	5:47
