= John "Juke" Logan =

American singer

- Born: John Farrell Logan; September 11, 1946; Los Angeles, California, United States
- Died: August 30, 2013 (aged 66) Joshua Tree, California, United States
- Genres: Electric blues
- Occupations: Harmonicist, singer, pianist, songwriter
- Instruments: Harmonica, vocals, piano
- Years active: Mid-1970s–2013
- Labels: Razor & Tie, Mocombo

John Farrell Logan (September 11, 1946 – August 30, 2013), known professionally as John "Juke" Logan, was an American electric blues harmonica player, musician, singer, pianist and songwriter. He is best known for his harmonica playing on the theme music for television programs (Home Improvement and Roseanne) and films (Crossroads and La Bamba). In addition to playing on many other musicians' work, Logan released four solo albums, and wrote songs for Poco, John Mayall and Gary Primich.

== Biography ==
John Farrell Logan was born in Los Angeles, California, United States. He gained his nickname, following his constant playing of Little Walter's track, "Juke". He originally learned to play the piano, and instigated his own groups the Juke Rhythm Band, and later the Angel City Rhythm Band. During his time playing in Southern California, he played with several musicians who went on to work with John Mayall, such as guitarists Rick Vito, Randy Resnick, and Greg LeRoy (Crazy Horse), plus drummer Joe Yuele.

His early career saw Logan work as a backing musician for Dobie Gray, Leon Russell and by the latter half of the 1980s, Dave Alvin. In addition, Logan's songwriting credits include John Mayall's "Fanning the Flames", Poco's "Starin' At The Sky" (co-penned with Timothy B. Schmit), plus Gary Primich's "The Sound of Money Talkin'" and "Hustler". In 1984, he worked with Ry Cooder on the soundtrack for the film, Crossroads. His own debut album, The Chill, was released in 1995, and after moving to his own Mocombo Records, followed this with Juke Rhythm (1999), the live album, Live as It Gets (1999), and his final offering, The Truth Will Rock You (2005). Until 2000, Logan co-hosted a Los Angeles-based weekly radio program, 'The Friday Night Blues Revue', with Ellen Bloom. He met fellow radio DJ and musician Stephanie Riggio, and they remained friends for decades.

Among many such efforts, Logan's harmonica work has appeared on The Dickies' Second Coming (1989), Richard Marx's Rush Street (1991), the Carla Olson / Mick Taylor Band's Too Hot For Snakes (1990), Gary Primich's My Pleasure (1992) and Travellin' Mood (1994), Heather Myles's Untamed (1995), John Mayall's Spinning Coin (1995), Cliff Richard's Songs from Heathcliff (1995), John Lee Hooker's Don't Look Back (1997), Doug MacLeod's Unmarked Road (1997), Adam Sandler's 1997 vintage, What's Your Name?, plus Stoned Immaculate: The Music of The Doors (2000), Sugar Ray's Sugar Ray (2001), Blue Xmas (various artists, 2001), Barry Goldberg's Stoned Again (2002), "Weird Al" Yankovic's 2003 album, Poodle Hat, Etta James's Blues to the Bone (2004) and J. J. Cale's Roll On plus Percy Sledge's Shining Through The Rain. Logan played the "harmonica drops" in the TV series Roseanne and appeared in Home Improvement.

In 2009, Logan was diagnosed with esophageal cancer and underwent successful surgery.

In 2010, in conjunction with Rick Holmstrom and Stephen Hodges, Logan appeared on the album, Twist-O-Lettz. In September 2011, Logan made a club appearance in Tucson, Arizona.

In 2011, Logan's cancer returned. In 2013, a benefit show was presented at Cafe Fais Do Do in Los Angeles, featuring Dave Alvin, The Delgado Brothers, and Rick Holmstrom among others.

In 2013, Logan died from cancer at the home he co-owned with Stephanie Riggio in Joshua Tree, California. He was 66.

== Discography ==
Year	Title	Record label
1995	The Chill	Razor & Tie Music
1999	Juke Rhythm	Mocombo
1999	Live as It Gets	Mocombo
2000	Custom Blues For You	Mocombo
2005	The Truth Will Rock You	Mocombo
2010	Twist-O-Lettz	Mocombo

== See also ==
- List of electric blues musicians
- List of harmonica blues musicians
