= Tom Russell =

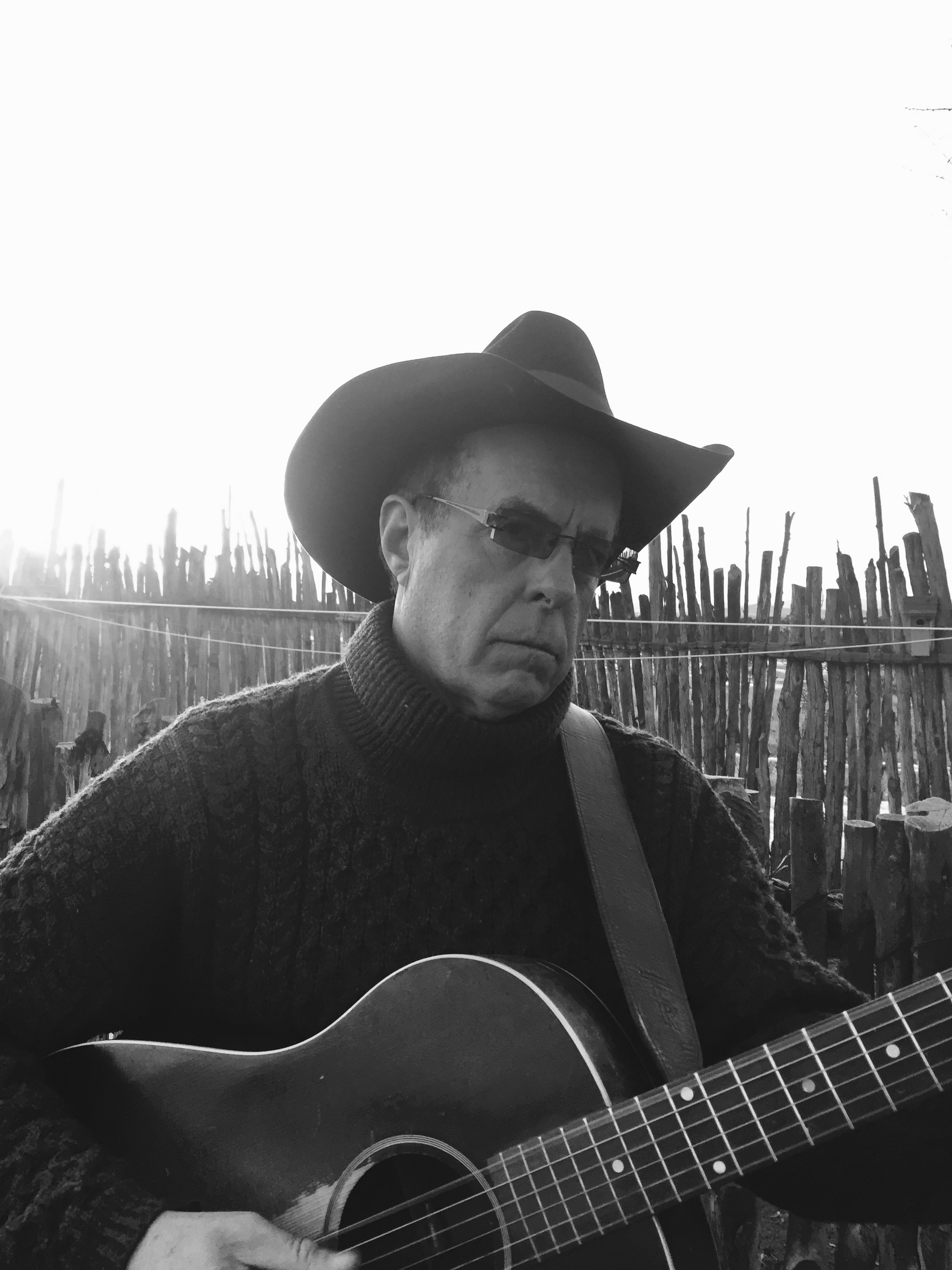
- Russell in 2016

Background information
- Born: Thomas George Russell; March 5, 1947 (age 79); Los Angeles, California, U.S.
- Genres: Americana, Folk, Country
- Occupations: Musician, songwriter
- Instruments: Vocals, guitar
- Labels: Shout! Factory, Frontera Records
- Website: tomrussell.com

Thomas George Russell (born March 5, 1947) is an American singer-songwriter. Although most strongly identified with the Americana music tradition, his music also incorporates elements of folk, rock, and the cowboy music of the American West. Many of his songs have been recorded by other artists, including Johnny Cash, The Texas Tornados, k.d. lang, Guy Clark, Joe Ely, The Sir Douglas Quintet, Jason Boland, Nanci Griffith, Katy Moffatt, Ramblin' Jack Elliott, Sailcat, Iris Dement, Dave Alvin, and Suzy Bogguss.

In addition to his music, Russell is also a painter and author. He has published a book of songwriting quotes (co-edited with Sylvia Tyson), a detective novel (in Scandinavia), a book of letters with Charles Bukowski, and two books from Bangtail Press: 120 Songs of Tom Russell, and Blue Horse/Red Desert - The Art of Tom Russell.

In 2016 a new book of Tom Russell essays was published: Ceremonies of the Horsemen. The essays, originally published in Ranch & Reata magazine, are centered on the American West and include an essay on Johnny Cash for which Russell won a 2015 ASCAP AWARD for music journalism.

Frontera, Russell's recording label, has published several books, including companion pieces to two recording projects, The Rose of Roscrae and Folk Hotel as well as an essay/art book, The Ballad of Western Expressionism and a novel, Against The Blood.

== Early life and career ==
Russell was born in Los Angeles. He graduated from the University of California, Santa Barbara with a master's degree in sociology of law and criminology. In 1969, he spent a year teaching in Ibadan, Nigeria, during the Biafran War. He has also lived in Spain and Norway—and played music at a circus in Puerto Rico. He began his musical career in the early 1970s in Vancouver, British Columbia, playing strip bars along Skid Row, then later relocated to Texas and formed a band with singer-pianist Patricia Hardin. In 1975, the duo won the Kerrville Folk Festival New Folk Singer-Songwriter Contest.

In 1977, the duo moved to San Francisco, performing regularly in clubs there as Hardin & Russell, during which time they recorded the second of their two studio albums. They eventually split in 1979, at which point Russell drifted out of the music industry for a year. It was during this hiatus that Russell wrote his classic song "Gallo Del Cielo". Both Hardin & Russell albums (Ring of Bone and Wax Museum) received high critical acclaim, and the first was reviewed in Rolling Stone by Chet Flippo. During this period Russell was also the winner of the first Woody Guthrie - William Oliver Award for songwriting, as well as the professional country category in the first American Song Festival.

Russell moved to New York City in 1980 and while working as a taxi driver in Queens, he met guitarist Andrew Hardin (no relation to Patricia). After hearing his songs, Hardin convinced him that they should form a new band. Shortly afterward, Robert Hunter of the Grateful Dead was a passenger in Russell's cab; Russell sang Hunter his song "Gallo Del Cielo" and an impressed Hunter invited Russell to join him on stage at New York's Bitter End. Hunter encouraged Russell to make a full-fledged return to the music business and Russell later opened for Hunter at the Lone Star Cafe. Hunter sang Russell's "Gallo Del Cielo" at the Glastonbury Festival in the UK.

Andrew Hardin remained Russell's full-time sideman until April, 2006. "Gallo del Cielo" became one of Russell's most fabled songs and has been recorded by Ian Tyson, Joe Ely, Brian Burns, Jason Boland and the Stragglers, and Katie Lee. The song has been cited as a favorite by Bob Dylan and Bruce Springsteen (as noted in Clarence Clemons' book Big Man.)

== Tom Russell Band ==
Between 1984 and 1994, the Tom Russell Band, composed of Russell on acoustic guitar and vocals, Andrew Hardin (guitar), Fats Kaplin (pedal steel, fiddle, harmonica, button accordion), Billy Troiani (bass), Rich Crane, Charlie Caldarola, and Mike Warner (drums), released four albums on Philo Records. These albums blended elements of folk, country and rock music, and often featured songs inspired by the American Southwest, blue-collar American life, and events from Russell's own life (for instance, the track "Road to Bayamon" draws on his experiences playing in a carnival in Puerto Rico). Russell's storytelling approach was also prominent in songs such as "Haley's Comet", which was also recorded by co-writer Dave Alvin and Doug Sahm and The Texas Tornados. "Haley's Comet" imaginatively recalls the last, tragic days in the life of rock and roll music legend Bill Haley. These early Tom Russell albums are now considered pioneering recordings of the genre which would come to be known as Americana.

Russell was next signed to HighTone Records in California. He released five albums for Hightone before the label was acquired by Shout! Factory Records. Russell's first album on the HighTone label, The Rose of the San Joaquin, was produced by Dave Alvin and Greg Leisz.

== The Man From God Knows Where ==
In the 1990s Russell released several critically acclaimed solo albums and also collaborated with blues singer Barrence Whitfield on two albums (Hillbilly Voodoo and Cowboy Mambo - recently released as a double CD). Russell also recorded an acoustic album mixing new material with his favorite cowboy-themed songs. His albums include guest appearances from other folk, country, and Americana artists, such as Chris Gaffney and Dave Alvin. Russell's song "Outbound Plane", co-written with Nanci Griffith, became a top-ten country hit for Suzy Bogguss. However, his most significant album of the 1990s was the innovative 1999 folk opera, The Man From God Knows Where.

Drawing on the music of Norway and Ireland in addition to American folk and country, The Man From God Knows Where is a song cycle tracing the journeys of Russell's ancestors from Europe to America and the struggles they encountered. Recorded in Norway near the spot where his great-grandfather was born in 1847, the album features singers Iris DeMent, Dolores Keane, Dave Van Ronk, and Kari Bremnes, portraying (and telling the stories of) Russell's various ancestors. The album's title came from the epitaph of a different Tom Russell, an Irish activist executed in 1803.

== Recent work ==
Russell's albums in the 21st century have been heavily influenced by the art, culture, history and folklore of the American Southwest. Albums such as Borderland resonate with a strong and authentic Tex-Mex influence, reflecting life on both sides of the border.

Russell's songs "Tonight We Ride" and "Navajo Rug" were chosen by members of the Western Writers of America as two of the top 100 Western songs of all time. In 2005 Russell released Hotwalker, the second part of his Americana trilogy (the first part being The Man From God Knows Where). It was another conceptual work largely inspired by his correspondence with author Charles Bukowski. Subtitled A Ballad for Gone America, the album features songs and spoken word pieces, many of the latter delivered by another friend of Bukowski, circus midget Little Jack Horton. The sampled voices of Lenny Bruce and Edward Abbey are also heard on the album, which takes the form of a musical collage lamenting the passing of the America of Russell's childhood and the Beat Generation. Jack Kerouac, Charles Bukowski, Ramblin' Jack Elliott, Harry Partch, and Dave Van Ronk also appear on the record.

Russell made five nationally televised appearances on the Late Show with David Letterman, as well as playing a show for Letterman in Montana.

In 2006, Russell released Love and Fear, a collection of original songs that were inspired by the highs and lows of his own relationships. This was followed in 2007 by Wounded Heart of America, a tribute album of Tom Russell songs covered by other artists, including Johnny Cash, Doug Sahm, Joe Ely, Suzy Bogguss, Dave Alvin, Jerry Jeff Walker, and beat poet laureate Lawrence Ferlinghetti. Two new songs, "Who's Gonna Build Your Wall?" and "The Death of Jimmy Martin", are also included on the album.

In 2008, Russell's new record company, Shout! Factory, released a 2-CD retrospective album entitled Veteran's Day: Anthology. Russell and legendary Canadian singer/songwriter Ian Tyson held court at Elko, Nevada's National Cowboy Poetry Gathering, producing Mano a Mano, a DVD on the art of songwriting.

In 2009, Shout! Factory released Russell's album Blood and Candle Smoke, featuring twelve original songs. The album was recorded at WaveLab Recording Studio in Tucson, Arizona with members of Calexico providing a world music beat to many of the songs. The album was produced by Tom Russell and Craig Schumacher, who has worked with Neko Case, Iron & Wine and Calexico. 2011 saw Russell release both a new album, Mesabi, and a documentary DVD, Don't Look Down.

In 2013, Frontera Records released Aztec Jazz, a concert recording made with the Norwegian Wind Ensemble (the oldest working orchestra in the world). With the ensemble, Russell was able to realize the vision of reframing some of his more recent songs. He also released Museum of Memories Vol. 2 (1973–2013), a collection of demos, outtakes and previously unreleased live recordings covering a forty-year span.

2014 saw the release of several new projects, including two on Frontera Records: Midway To Bayamon, a compilation of two mid-80s cassette-only releases plus bonus tracks, and Tonight We Ride, an anthology of cowboy songs, including some previously unreleased tracks. The Rockbeat label issued a 2-CD set, The Western Years, collecting western-themed songs primarily from Russell's years on the HighTone label. Rockbeat also re-issued the acclaimed Americana classic Tulare Dust: A Songwriters' Tribute To Merle Haggard which Russell co-produced with Dave Alvin, including a bonus disc taken from a live concert given by many of the artists involved with the project.

In April 2015 Russell released The Rose of Roscrae, a double-album on Frontera Records, a Western folk opera that completes the trilogy begun with The Man From God Knows Where and Hotwalker. The double album depicts the journey of an Irishman named Johnny Dutton who sails to America to become a cowboy. There are 52 tracks interspersed with historic and contemporary voices that include: Johnny Cash, Walt Whitman, John Trudell, Lead Belly, Joe Ely, Jimmie Dale Gilmore, Tex Ritter, Eliza Gilkyson, Augie Meyers, Finbar Furey, Maura O'Connell, Jimmy LaFave, A.L. Lloyd, Glen Orhlin, Sourdough Slim, David Olney and others, as well as an overture by Mats Halling and The Norwegian Wind Ensemble. The Rose of Roscrae was hailed as the top folk album of 2015 in many publications, including The Irish Times, Mojo Magazine, Uncut, and The Los Angeles Times.

In 2016 Frontera Records released the second Tom Russell Anthology: Gunpowder Sunsets, including favorites from recent albums along with previously unreleased material.

Russell released two projects in 2017, Play One More: The Songs of Ian & Sylvia through True North Records, and the Frontera Records release of new original songs, Folk Hotel, which was well received.

To replace the out-of-print "Veteran's Day" anthology, Russell returned to the studio with former guitarist Andrew Hardin to re-record his best known songs in an acoustic format called "Old Songs Yet To Sing."

In 2019, Russell released an album of new compositions, October in the Railroad Earth, featuring Bill Kirchen on guitar and Eliza Gilkyson guesting on harmony vocals on two tracks. The project was favorably reviewed by critics, including a four-star review in AllMusic.
