= Katy Moffatt =

American singer-songwriter

- Rock and Roll Hall of Fame Tribute to Les Paul, State Theater, Cleveland OH, November 15, 2008

Background information
- Born: November 19, 1950 (age 75)
- Origin: Fort Worth, Texas, U.S.
- Instrument: acoustic guitar
- Years active: 1970s – present
- Website: Katy Moffatt: Americana Musician

Katherine Louella "Katy" Moffatt (born November 19, 1950) is an American musician, lyricist, composer, and vocalist. She is the sister of country singer-songwriter Hugh Moffatt.

== Midnight radio ==
Moffatt became impassioned by music as a child growing up in Fort Worth, Texas. She was captivated by Broadway show tunes, the Beatles, and the Motown sound, and has said that she was such an avid listener to Top 40 radio that "I used to come home from school, have dinner, go to bed, and set the alarm for midnight. Then I'd get up and do my homework and listen to the radio. It was my favorite time – I could be alone with the music."

== Early influences ==
Moffatt points to the influence of the Beatles and the bands of the British Invasion as inspiring her to learn the guitar. She credits Leonard Cohen's "Dress Rehearsal Rag" for making her want to perform and says folk singers like Judy Collins, Phil Ochs, and Dave Van Ronk were her models. Ella Fitzgerald and the versatile vocalist, Tracy Nelson were also important influences.

== Early life and career ==
Moffatt was born in Fort Worth, Texas. She left Fort Worth to attend Tulane University in New Orleans but ended up studying at St. John's College in Santa Fe, New Mexico. In Santa Fe, she developed a local following performing her songs at the college. Her local fame won her a part as a folk singer in Tom Laughlin's movie, "Billy Jack." In 1971, as an aspiring singer-songwriter, she moved to Denver, Colorado to find an audience in the growing musical community there. While working a regular cocktail hour gig at a Denver hotel, Moffatt met Mary Flower and Randy Handley and who, along with Lon Ephraim, formed a band called Flower, Handley, and Moffatt. The band developed a following and traveled all over the state performing. Eventually, Moffatt and Flower became a duo and toured on the national coffeehouse circuit.

Moffatt's frequent gigs as a solo performer at Ebbets Field, a prominent Denver music club, opened a door to the mainstream recording industry. From 1975 to 1979 she recorded for Columbia Records, making several singles and two albums – Katy (produced by Billy Sherrill) and Kissin' in the California Sun.

== On the road and recording career ==
Coinciding with her recording at Columbia, Moffatt opened for such performers as Charlie Daniels, Warren Zevon, Muddy Waters, and Steve Martin, and she toured with Leo Kottke. She also worked with Willie Nelson and Andrew Gold, appeared with Poco and John Prine, and toured with Jerry Jeff Walker, JD Souther and the Allman Brothers. She also has done songs with Michael Martin Murphey such as "Hard Country," "Take It As It Comes," and a live version of "Backsliders Wine" on his 1979 album Peaks, Valleys, Honky-Tonks and Alleys. For a brief time in the early 1980s, while waiting out two management contracts, Moffatt was a sought-after and featured touring harmony and duet singer for four prominent acts.

With that music industry experience behind her, she returned to making records including recording several songs for the short-lived Permian record label that were released to country radio and pursued an ever-expansive solo artist's path. She began making records as she wanted them to be made and licensed several gems which became favorites and remain so within her body of work thus far, including "Walkin' On the Moon", "The Greatest Show on Earth" (aka "The Evangeline Hotel"), "Hearts Gone Wild", and "Angel Town".

Like many American singer-songwriters, Katy Moffatt is honored both abroad and in her own country. She regularly tours Europe and the U.K.

== Industry recognition ==
1985 Academy of Country Music nomination as Best New Female Vocalist
