= Chris Gaffney (musician) =

American musician

- Born: Christopher F. Gaffney; October 3, 1950; Vienna, Austria
- Origin: Arizona and California, United States
- Died: April 17, 2008 (aged 57)
- Genres: Country, alt-country, rock, rockabilly, Bakersfield sound, blues, soul, Norteño
- Instruments: Guitar, accordion

Christopher F. Gaffney (October 3, 1950 – April 17, 2008) was an American singer and songwriter from the Southwest. His career, both as a solo musician and as a member of several bands, was as eclectic as his musical tastes. Although he never achieved widespread fame, Gaffney, who died at the age of 57 from liver cancer, left his mark on country, rock, soul, and other forms of American music. In its obituary, the Los Angeles Times described Gaffney as "a peer of [Dave] Alvin, Los Lobos, X and the Red Hot Chili Peppers in chronicling the life of Southern California."

== Career ==
A self-described "army brat," Christopher F. Gaffney was born in Vienna, Austria, he then moved to Livorno, Italy and New York City as a young child. But Gaffney grew up primarily in southern California and Arizona. In addition to music, Gaffney loved sports, especially boxing, and earned an LA Golden Gloves championship in 1967 and even trained with boxing hall-of-famer Jackie McCoy.

As a child, he learned to play the accordion and listened to norteno, country, and rock & roll. As a teenager, Gaffney played in various house bands and eventually released his first solo album, Road to Indio, in 1986. Produced by friend Wyman Reese, his debut album demonstrated his "genre-bending" tastes by showcasing forays into honky tonk, soul, and Bakersfield country.

His next album was as Chris Gaffney & the Cold Hard Facts. Released in 1990, this album revealed Latino influences and dealt with issues of poverty and working-class life. Two years later, Gaffney released Mi Vida Loca which has been described as a "cross between Merle Haggard and The Blasters." His next solo album, Loser's Paradise (1995), was produced by Gaffney's friend Dave Alvin and featured contributions from Lucinda Williams and Jim Lauderdale.

In 2002, Gaffney formed the Hacienda Brothers with guitarist/songwriter Dave Gonzalez, a founding member of The Paladins. They recorded their third studio album Arizona Motel shortly before Gaffney's death in early 2008. He died from liver cancer in Newport Beach, California.

In addition to his solo and band work, Gaffney has also toured as a member of Dave Alvin & the Guilty Men and contributed to albums by Lucinda Williams, Tom Russell, Christy McWilson, Billy Bacon and the Forbidden Pigs, the Iguanas, and the Lonesome Strangers.

In 2009, a tribute album to Gaffney was released, Man of Somebody's Dreams: A Tribute to the Songs of Chris Gaffney, which included songs played by fellow Hacienda Brothers as well as others such as Dave Alvin and Los Lobos.

In 2011, Dave Alvin included a song about Gaffney, "Run Conejo Run", in his album Eleven Eleven.

== Discography ==
=== Solo ===
- 1986 – Road to Indio
- 1990 – Chris Gaffney & the Cold Hard Facts
- 1992 – Mi Vida Loca
- 1994 – Man of Somebody's Dreams (Live, Zurich, Switzerland, April 22, 1994)
- 1995 – Loser's Paradise
- 1999 – Live and Then Some [2-CD set: (Disc 1 – live, San Juan Capistrano, California, March 27/28, 1999; Disc 2 – reissue of the Road to Indio album)]

=== With Hacienda Brothers ===
- 2005 – Hacienda Brothers
- 2006 – What's Wrong with Right
- 2007 – Music for Ranch & Town: Hacienda Brothers Live (Live, Oslo, Norway, October 8, 2005)
- 2008 – Arizona Motel
- 2019 – Western Soul (compilation of the original demo sessions from March 2003; rough mixes for the debut album from November 2003; unreleased studio tracks from January 2005; plus a couple of alternate takes from November 2006 and December 2007)

=== Tribute album ===
- 2009 – Man of Somebody's Dreams: A Tribute to the Songs of Chris Gaffney
