= Dave Alvin =

American singer-songwriter and guitarist (born 1955)

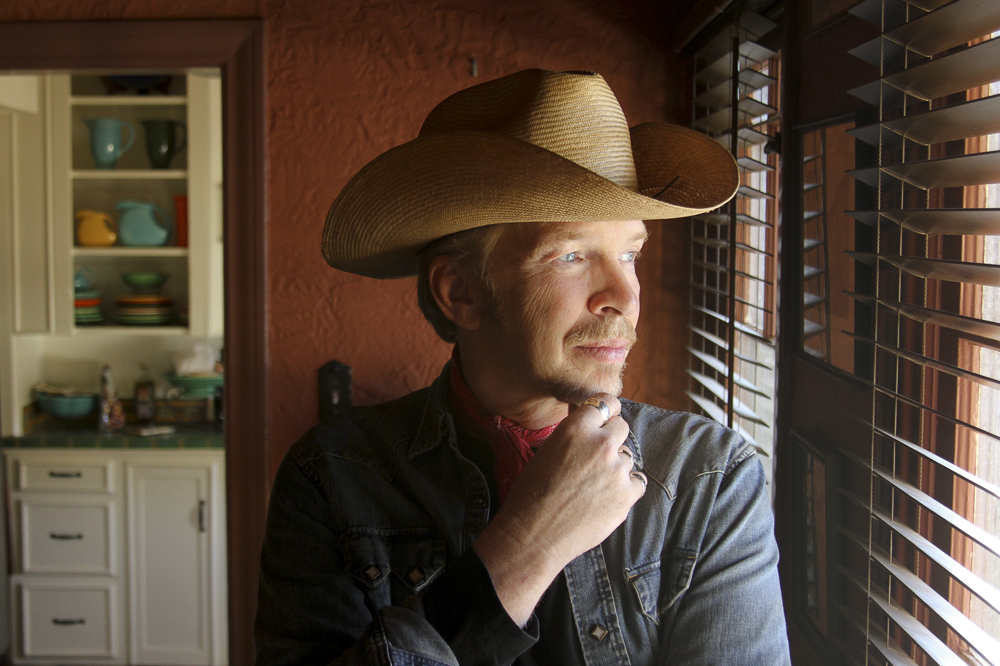
- Alvin in 2011

Background information
- Born: David Albert Alvin; November 11, 1955 (age 70)
- Origin: Downey, California, U.S.
- Genres: Americana, alternative country, rockabilly, country rock, folk rock
- Occupations: Musician; singer; songwriter; producer
- Instruments: Guitar, vocals
- Years active: 1977–present
- Labels: Rhino, Yep Roc
- Formerly of: The Blasters; The Knitters; The Flesh Eaters; X

David Albert Alvin (born November 11, 1955) is an American singer-songwriter, guitarist and producer. He is a former and founding member of the roots rock band the Blasters. Alvin has recorded and performed as a solo artist since the late 1980s and has been involved in various side projects and collaborations. He has had brief stints as a member of the bands X and the Knitters. He often refers to himself as "Blackjack Dave," in reference to his 1998 album and song of the same name.

== Early life ==
Alvin grew up in Downey, California. He and his older brother, Phil Alvin, as teenagers frequented blues, rockabilly and country music venues. Dave attended Long Beach State University.

== Career ==
=== With the Blasters ===
In 1979, Alvin and his brother Phil formed the roots-rock band The Blasters with fellow Downey residents Bill Bateman and John Bazz. Alvin served as the group's lead guitarist and chief songwriter. The Rough Guide to Rock noted the ever-increasing numbers of originals that Alvin wrote for the Blasters, along with his maturation into a great songwriter.

Other artists have covered Alvin's songs. For example, "Marie Marie" became a British-German top 20 hit in 1980 for Shakin' Stevens and received a zydeco treatment in 1987 from Buckwheat Zydeco. Dwight Yoakam recorded "Long White Cadillac" in 1989.

Alvin was in the original lineup until 1986. His departure reflected internal tension in the band, but ultimately he wanted to sing his own songs while his brother Phil Alvin was the established lead vocalist for the group.

Alvin has rejoined the Blasters for some reunion tours and live albums with the original lineup. He has also occasionally performed with the band under other circumstances as well.

=== With X and the Knitters ===
Alvin served a brief stint as the lead guitarist of the Los Angeles–based alternative rock band X. He left X in 1987 to work on a solo project after the group recorded their album See How We Are.

Alvin was also a member of the country folk band The Knitters, an offshoot of X. He appeared on their 1985 album Poor Little Critter on the Road and their 2005 follow-up, The Modern Sounds of the Knitters.

=== With the Flesh Eaters ===
In the early 1980s, Alvin, along with fellow Blasters members Bill Bateman and Steve Berlin, performed on A Minute to Pray, A Second to Die by the Los Angeles punk band the Flesh Eaters. This lineup, which also included John Doe and D.J. Bonebrake, assembled once again in 2006, performing three shows in California and one in England to mark the album's 25th anniversary. They reunited briefly in 2015 for a five-show tour and again for an eight-show run in 2018. They issued a new album, I Used to Be Pretty, in 2019.

=== Solo ===
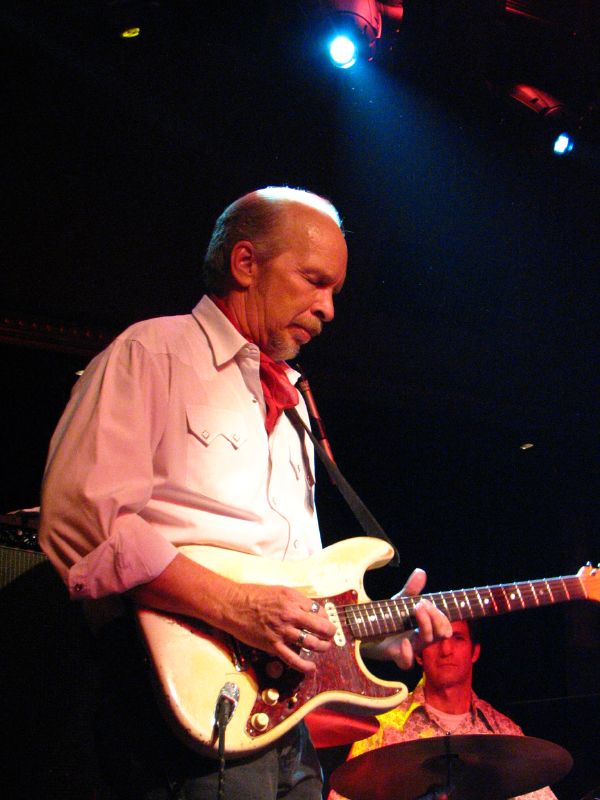
Alvin in 2007

Alvin's first solo album, Romeo's Escape (entitled Every Night About This Time in England), was released in 1987. It was well received by critics but did not sell well. Because of the album's low sales, Alvin's recording contract with Columbia Records was terminated. He then toured with Mojo Nixon and Country Dick Montana, billed as the Pleasure Barons; an album recorded live on their 1993 tour was released.

Alvin's second solo album, Blue Blvd, was released by Hightone Records in 1991. It received positive reviews and had moderate sales. His album Museum of Heart was released in 1993. He recorded King of California, an album of acoustic music, in 1994. In 2000, he recorded the album Public Domain: Songs From the Wild Land, a collection of traditional folk and blues classics, which earned him a Grammy award for Best Contemporary Folk Album.

In 2011, Alvin recorded the album Eleven Eleven, released by Yep Roc Records. The album marked his return to rock roots. Rolling Stone magazine, in a review of the album, called Alvin "an underrecognized guitar hero".

=== Further recordings with Phil Alvin ===
In 2014, Dave and Phil Alvin, as a duo, released the album Common Ground, consisting of their versions of songs by Big Bill Broonzy. It was the first studio collaboration of the brothers since the mid-1980s. In 2015 they released Lost Time, a collection of covers including four songs by Big Joe Turner.

In live performance, Alvin assumed the role of emcee and storyteller. The brothers also worked Blasters tunes into the set list.

=== With Jimmie Dale Gilmore ===
Alvin and Texas singer-songwriter Jimmie Dale Gilmore teamed on the 2018 album Downey to Lubbock (the title is a reference to where each man grew up).

As seen in his live performances with brother Phil, Alvin's stories between songs were a notable part of the stage shows with Gilmore and their supporting musicians.

In April 2022, Alvin announced his return to public performance after a grueling two-year battle with different forms of cancer that started in May 2020. He chose to do so with Gilmore, scheduling nine dates in California for late June and early July 2022.

=== Producer and collaborator ===
Alvin has produced records for Chris Gaffney, Tom Russell, the Derailers, Big Sandy & His Fly-Rite Boys and Red Meat. He collaborated with the rockabilly musician Sonny Burgess. He has worked as a studio session musician accompanying Ramblin' Jack Elliott, Little Milton, Katy Moffatt, and Syd Straw.

Alvin has lent his guitar playing to other artists' albums over the years. For example, he played with the Gun Club and appeared on two songs from their 1984 album, The Las Vegas Story

=== Film ===
Alvin appeared in the movies Border Radio and Floundering and on the FX television series Justified in 2011. He also appeared in Streets of Fire, with the Blasters, in 1984.

=== Poetry and other writing ===
Alvin has published two books of poetry: Any Rough Times Are Now Behind You and Nana, Big Joe & the Fourth of July. His poetry has appeared in Caffeine, the A.K.A. Review, Rattler, Asymptote and Enclitic and in the anthologies Nude Erections, Hit and Run Poets and Poetry Loves Poetry—An Anthology of Los Angeles Poets.

A collection of Alvin's writing called New Highway was scheduled for release in September 2022. Its subtitle -- Selected Lyrics, Poems, Prose, Essays, Eulogies and Blues -- described the scope of his work.

== The Blasters discography ==
(recordings with Dave Alvin as member)

- American Music (1980)
- The Blasters (1981)
- Over There (Live at The Venue, London) (1982) 6-song EP
- Non Fiction (1983)
- Hard Line (1985)
- The Blasters Collection (1990)
- Testament: The Complete Slash Recordings (2002) 2-CD
- Trouble Bound (2002)
- Going Home: The Blasters Live (2004)
- Live 1986 (2011)
- Mandatory: The Best of The Blasters (2023)
- Over There (Live at the Venue, London 1982) – The Complete Concert (2024) 2-CD

== The Blasters videography ==
- Streets of Fire (1984)
- Going Home: The Blasters Live (2004)

== X discography ==
- See How We Are (1987)

== The Knitters discography ==
- Poor Little Critter on the Road (1985)
- The Modern Sounds of the Knitters (2005)

== The Pleasure Barons discography ==
- Live in Las Vegas (1993)

== Gene Taylor Blues Band discography ==
- Live!!! 605 Boogie!!! (2008) personnel: Gene Taylor/piano, Dave Alvin/guitar, John Bazz/bass, Bill Bateman/drums.

== The Third Mind discography ==
- The Third Mind (2020)
- The Third Mind/2 (2023) 6-song EP/CD
- Live Mind (2025)
- Right Now! (2025)
- Spellbinder! (2026)

== Dave Alvin discography ==
Year	Album	Chart Positions			
Year	Album	US Country	US	US Heat	US Indie
1987	Romeo's Escape (also released as Every Night About This Time)	60	116	—	—
1991	Blue Blvd	—	—	—	—
1993	Museum of Heart	—	—	—	—
1994	King of California	—	—	—	—
1996	Interstate City	—	—	—	—
1998	Blackjack David	—	—	—	—
2000	Public Domain: Songs from the Wild Land	—	—	—	—
2002	Out in California	—	—	—	—
2002	Outtakes in California [Limited Edition]	—	—	—	—
2004	Ashgrove	—	—	—	38
2005	The Great American Music Galaxy	—	—	—	—
2006	West of the West	—	—	24	35
2007	Live from Austin, TX (Austin City Limits)	—	—	—	—
2009	Dave Alvin and the Guilty Women	—	—	—	—
2011	Eleven Eleven	—	159	4	31
2014	Common Ground: Dave & Phil Alvin Play and Sing the Songs of Big Bill Broonzy (with Phil Alvin)	—	144	3	25
2015	Lost Time (with Phil Alvin)	—	—	8	32
2018	Downey to Lubbock (with Jimmie Dale Gilmore)	41	—	2	12
2020	From An Old Guitar (Rare and Unreleased Tracks)	—	—	—	—
2024	TexiCali (with Jimmie Dale Gilmore)	—	—	—	—
"—" denotes releases that did not chart

=== Other contributions ===
- Lead vocal on "Time After Time" and "I Just Keep Lovin' Her" on Skip Heller's Homegoing (Innova Recordings 577) (2002)
- Lead guitar on "Believe" and "Amazing Disgrace" on Dollar Store's Dollar Store (Bloodshot Records BS-098) (2004)
- Eklektikos Live (2005) – "Blackjack David"
- Highway 61 Revisited Revisited, UNCUT (2005) – "Highway 61 Revisited"
- The Lone Ranger: Wanted (2013) – "Lonesome Whistle"
- Produced and arranged Chris Gaffney's 1995 album Loser's Paradise released on Hightone Records.
- Produced Billy Bacon and the Forbidden Pigs' 1995 album The Other White Meat released on Triple X Records.
- Produced Christy McWilson's 2000 album The Lucky One, and her 2002 album Bed of Roses, both released on Hightone.
- Produced Carolyn Wonderland's 2021 album Tempting Fate, and her 2025 album Truth Is, both released on Alligator Records.
- Lead vocal/guitar on "Blind Owl" on Canned Heat's Final Vinyl (Ruf Records 1309) (2024)

== Writings ==
- Nana, Big Joe & the Fourth of July (Iliteratim 1986) ASIN B000V96DW4
- Any Rough Times Are Now Behind You (Incommunicado Press, 1996) ISBN 9781884615092
- New Highway: Selected Lyrics, Poems, Prose, Essays, Eulogies and Blues (BMG Books, 2022) ISBN 9781947026919
