= The Western Tapes, 1983 =

EP by Lone Justice
- Released: 23 November 2018
- Recorded: 1983
- Studio: Record Plant, Los Angeles; Mystic Sound, Los Angeles
- Genre: Country rock; country music; alternative country; cowpunk
- Length: 17:39
- Label: Omnivore Recordings
- Producer: Marvin Etzioni; Ryan Hedgecock

Lone Justice chronology
This Is Lone Justice: The Vaught Tapes, 1983 (2014)	The Western Tapes, 1983 (2018)	Live at the Palomino, 1983 (2019)

Professional ratings
Review scores
Source	Rating
AllMusic	3.5/5 stars

The Western Tapes, 1983 is an EP by American country rock band Lone Justice, released on 23 November 2018 by Omnivore Recordings. It consists of demo recordings made in 1983 prior to their self-titled debut release in 1985 and was recorded by the original Lone Justice lineup consisting of Maria McKee, Ryan Hedgecock, Dave Harrington and Don Willens. All tracks are previously unissued, except "Drugstore Cowboy" which was included on the compilation album This World Is Not My Home in 1999. David Mansfield, who has toured with Bob Dylan and later became a member of Bruce Hornsby and the Range, guests on pedal steel guitar and fiddle.

== Background ==
Musician Marvin Etzioni had met Maria McKee and Ryan Hedgecock in 1982, when he saw them perform as a duo at the Cathay de Grande night club in Los Angeles, playing half a dozen country covers. He was impressed by their performance and suggested that they start writing their own songs. McKee and Hedgecock soon added bassist Dave Harrington and drummer Don Willens to the lineup and became Lone Justice. Etzioni said: "Once they added a rhythm section, Ryan called and asked me to come by rehearsals. I was then brought in as producer, arranger and songster." Etzioni wrote "Working Late" and "I See It" specifically for the band.

Through their live performances, the band garnered interest from Geffen Records, who offered to finance a demo recording. The band then recorded five songs in May 1983 at the Record Plant in Los Angeles with Etzioni producing. Geffen liked the demo tape but worried about the band being "too country", especially for a label that didn't have any experience with country music. This caused Geffen to pass on Lone Justice for the time being.

The Record Plant recordings make up five of the six tracks on The Western Tapes, 1983, while an earlier session produced by Hedgecock and recorded at Mystic Sound in Los Angeles provides the sixth track. Three of the songs ("Working Late", "Don't Toss Us Away" and "The Train") would be rerecorded during sessions for the band's debut album, Lone Justice, released by Geffen in 1985.

== Critical reception ==
Coachella Valley Weekly wrote, "Listening to this music 35 years on, the songs are imbued with a passion and authenticity that somehow eluded their Geffen debut. ... imagine how great their first full-length could have been with Marvin Etzioni behind the boards. He captures the raw exuberance that made Lone Justice so special."

AllMusic wrote that the band has "an energy and freshness that are absolutely winning" and also praised Marvin Etzionis production for its "straightforward but full-bodied" sound, and for bringing out "solid performances" from everyone involved. They felt that Maria McKee's voice "is still a thing of wonder all these years later, a pure country instrument that still has the force to sing thoroughly convincing rock & roll." AllMusic added: "One can't help wish some smart indie label had cut a low-budget album on this band ... that would have documented their heyday before Geffen got ahold of them." They concluded, saying: "this is great fun from a band that had a lot to offer - more than their best-known work might suggest."

Country Standard Time wrote, "There's a freshness and innocence about these six recordings that will remind you just how special Lone Justice was at their inception", adding that "Lone Justice was alt.-country long before alt.-country was cool".

All About Jazz singled out "Working Late" and "Don't Toss Us Away", describing them as "superior to subsequent studio versions". They felt that the EP was mastered "to impressive effect ... forging a sonic clarity in line with the pioneering stylistic vision of Lone Justice."

== Track listing ==
Adapted from the EP's liner notes.

No.	Title	Writer(s)	Length
1.	"Working Late"	Marvin Etzioni	2:44
2.	"Don't Toss Us Away"	Bryan MacLean	4:29
3.	"I See It"	Etzioni	2:38
4.	"The Train"	Ryan Hedgecock	2:54
5.	"Drugstore Cowboy"	Maria McKee	2:54
6.	"How Lonesome Life Has Been"	Hedgecock, McKee	2:06

== Personnel ==
Adapted from the EP's liner notes.

Lone Justice

- Maria McKee – vocals, rhythm guitar
- Ryan Hedgecock – vocals, lead guitar
- Dave Harrington – bass
- Don Willens – drums

Additional personnel

- David Mansfield – pedal steel guitar, fiddle

Production

- Marvin Etzioni – producer (except "How Lonesome Life Has Been"), mixing, liner notes
- Ryan Hedgecock – producer ("How Lonesome Life Has Been")
- Ricky Delena – engineer, mixing
- Ed – assistant engineer
- Beem – assistant engineer
- Adam Pike – tape transfer, post production
- Bernie Grundman – mastering
- Alan Smithee – cover photography
- Greg Allen – art direction, design
- Produced for release by Greg Allen and Cheryl Pawelski
