= This World Is Not My Home (Lone Justice album) =

Compilation album by Lone Justice
- Released: January 1999
- Recorded: 1983–1987
- Genre: Country rock
- Length: 61:03
- Label: Geffen
- Producer: Jimmy Iovine; Steven Van Zandt; Lone Justice; Marvin Etzioni

Lone Justice chronology
BBC Radio 1 Live in Concert (1994)	This World Is Not My Home (1999)	The Best of Lone Justice (2003)

Professional ratings
Review scores
Source	Rating
AllMusic	3/5 stars
Entertainment Weekly	A

This World Is Not My Home is a compilation album by American country rock band Lone Justice, released in January 1999 by Geffen. It contains tracks from their two studio albums, Lone Justice and Shelter, as well as several early demos and outtakes, including nine previously unreleased tracks.

== Track listing ==
Adapted from the album's liner notes.

No.	Title	Writer(s)	Original release	Length
1.	"Drugstore Cowboy"	Maria McKee	previously unreleased	2:54
2.	"Rattlesnake Mama"	Traditional	previously unreleased	1:46
3.	"This World Is Not My Home"	Traditional	previously unreleased	2:33
4.	"Working Man Blues"	Merle Haggard	previously unreleased	2:37
5.	"Cottonbelt"	McKee	previously unreleased	3:11
6.	"Go 'Way Little Boy"	Bob Dylan	B-side to "Sweet, Sweet Baby (I'm Falling)" (UK 12-inch), 1985	2:40
7.	"The Train"	Ryan Hedgecock	previously unreleased	2:51
8.	"East of Eden"	Marvin Etzioni	Lone Justice, 1985	2:35
9.	"Ways to Be Wicked"	Tom Petty, Mike Campbell	Lone Justice	3:26
10.	"Don't Toss Us Away"	Bryan MacLean	Lone Justice	4:19
11.	"You Are the Light"	Etzioni	Lone Justice	3:59
12.	"Sweet Jane" (live)	Lou Reed	previously unreleased	3:55
13.	"I Found Love"	McKee, Steven Van Zandt	Shelter, 1986	4:18
14.	"Shelter"	McKee, Van Zandt	Shelter	4:33
15.	"Dixie Storms"	McKee	Shelter	3:36
16.	"Sweet, Sweet Baby (I'm Falling)" (live)	McKee, Van Zandt, Benmont Tench	previously unreleased	5:01
17.	"Wheels" (live)	McKee	previously unreleased	6:49

Notes'

- Track 1 – demo session recorded in May 1983.
- Tracks 2, 3 and 4 – demo session recorded in December 1983 at Suite 16 Studios, Los Angeles, direct to two-track tape with no overdubs.
- Tracks 5 and 7 – outtakes from Lone Justice.
- Track 12 – recorded live at Hartford Civic Center, Hartford, Connecticut, April 23, 1985.
- Tracks 16 and 17 – recorded live at the Ritz in New York City, February 19, 1987.

== Personnel ==
Adapted from the album's liner notes.

Lone Justice

- Maria McKee – vocals, guitar [1, 3–5, 8, 12, 16], harmonica [6, 11], piano [17]
- Ryan Hedgecock – guitar [1–14], vocals [1, 3, 7, 8]
- David Harrington – bass [1]
- Don Willens – drums [1]
- Marvin Etzioni – bass [2–12], vocals [6, 8, 11], maracas [8]
- Don Heffington – drums [2–12], vocals [8], maracas [8]
- Tony Gilkyson – guitar [12]
- Shane Fontayne – guitar [13–17], baritone guitar [7]
- Gregg Sutton – bass [13, 14, 16, 17], vocals [17]
- Bruce Brody – keyboards [13–17]
- Rudy Richman – drums [13, 14, 16, 17]

Additional personnel

- Benmont Tench – piano [6, 7, 9, 10, 15], organ [6–11], vocals [8]
- Ron Wood – lead guitar [6]
- Bob Dylan – rhythm guitar [6]
- Mike Campbell – guitar [9]
- Bob Glaub – bass [9]
- Bobbye Hall – tambourine [9]
- Bono – vocals [12]
- Alexandra Brown – vocals [13]
- Portia Griffin – vocals [13]
- Vesta Williams – vocals [13]

Production

- Marvin Etzioni – producer [1], compilation, compilation producer
- Jimmy Iovine – producer [5–11, 13–17]
- Steven Van Zandt – producer [13–15]
- Lone Justice – producer [13–15]
- David Vaught – engineer [2–4]
- Tony Ferguson – engineer [12]
- Bernie Grundman – mastering
- Jeff Magid – compilation, compilation producer
- Maria McKee – compilation, compilation producer
- Ryan Hedgecock – compilation, compilation producer
- Don Heffington – compilation, compilation producer
- Valerie Pack – production coordinator
- Janet Wolsborn – art direction
- Chris Morris – liner notes
