= Propeller (Peter Stuart album) =

Studio album by Peter Stuart
- Released: August 13, 2002
- Genre: Alternative, Pop Rock
- Length: 40:54
- Label: Vanguard Records
- Producer: Andrew Williams; Curtis Schneider

Propeller is a 2002 studio album from the American singer-songwriter Peter Stuart. The album marked Stuart's solo debut. Stuart had previously formed the rock band Dog's Eye View in 1994. Before their hiatus, Stuart had been Dog's Eye View's lead vocalist and songwriter.

The album's lead single was "With My Heart in Your Hands".

== Background ==
Dog's Eye View founder and vocalist Peter Stuart had left the band to pursue solo projects following their 1997 release, Daisy. Stuart, who had been a solo performer prior to forming Dog's Eye View, has stated that the idea of his making a solo album originally came from the group's record label, Columbia Records:

Originally it was Columbia Records saying, "You're doing a solo record now. We're tired of the band." But, it (Dog's Eye View) was their idea in the first place. I was always a solo guy. So I was like, "OK." So I made that record as Peter Stuart and didn't even think about it when I got off the label with it. Didn't think of it being a Dog's Eye View record because it wasn't. It was a solo record.

His first solo album was originally slated to be called Songs About You. Stuart began recording the album for Columbia, which had released the first two Dog's Eye View albums, Happy Nowhere and Daisy. Early production and recording were completed in Los Angeles. However, Stuart soon became disenchanted with Columbia executives, citing a lack of support for the album and other creative differences. He voluntarily severed ties with Columbia, and left the label with the rights to his forthcoming solo album.

He sold four solo CDs while touring as an opening actor for Paula Cole, Live, and Counting Crows. At one point, Stuart embarked in a six-week stint as Paula Cole's opening act by following her tour bus in his rental car, while looking for a new label.

== Album production ==
In 1999, Stuart attended a songwriters' workshop and retreat at a castle in the south of France. He had been invited to the retreat by Miles Copeland III, the former manager of Sting and The Police. During the workshop, Stuart began writing material for his first solo album, which would later be called Propeller. The first song penned for the album at the workshop was "Innocence".

Stuart completed work on Propeller in early 2001, more than a year before the album's major label release. The album was produced by Andrew Williams and Curtis Schneider. Stuart sold several thousand copies in 2001 and 2002 while shopping the album to potential record labels. The album was picked up by Vanguard Records, which released it in August 2002. Propeller featured background vocals from Adam Duritz, frontman of Counting Crows, and Moon Zappa. Other guest musicians, including Mark Isham, D. J. Bonebrake, Greg Leisz, and David Immergluck and Charlie Gillingham of Counting Crows, contributed to the album.

Vanguard Records would later also release Dog's Eye View's third studio album, Tomorrow Always Comes, in 2006.

== Reviews ==
Billboard Magazine published a largely positive review of the album, writing in its August 24, 2002, edition: "When you find yourself humming along with an entire album and not wanting it to end, while also feeling that the artist is being completely honest and heartfelt, the project is definitely a special one. Stuart, the former Dog's Eye View frontman, accomplishes this difficult task with his solo debut."

== Track listing ==
1. "Take Me Back" – 4:08
2. "Propeller Girl" – 4:17
3. "Innocence" – 4:36
4. "With My Heart in Your Hands " – 3:24
5. "Vertigo" – 3:37
6. "Let's Get Lost" – 4:10
7. "Roll Me Over" – 4:24
8. "Songs About You" – 3:10
9. "Here I Am Here" – 2:42
10. "The Real You" – 3:28
11. "Bring You Back" – 3:07

== Personnel ==
- Greg Leisz – guitar
- Curt Bisquera – drums
- Jay Bellerose – drums
- Adam Duritz – vocals
- Denny Fongheiser
- Don Heffington – percussion
- Kevin Savigar – keyboards
- Charlie Gillingham – keyboards
- Dan Rothchild
- D. J. Bonebrake – vibraphone
- Moon Unit Zappa – background vocals
- Peter Stuart – vocals, guitar
- Andrew Williams – guitar, piano, background vocals
- Boots Ottestad
- David Immergl++ck
- Susie Katayama – arranger, conductor
