= Best Of (Voice of the Beehive album) =

Greatest hits album by Voice of the Beehive
- Released: 1997
- Recorded: 1987–1991
- Genre: Alternative rock/pop
- Producer: Pat Collier; Pete Collins; Marvin Etzioni; Leigh Gorman; Harding & Curnow; Gary Jangan; Hugh Jones; Alan Tarney; Don Was

Voice of the Beehive chronology
Sex & Misery (1995)	Best Of (1997)

Best Of is a compilation album from alternative rock band Voice of the Beehive. Released in the UK only, it was the second Voice of the Beehive hits collection (the first being 1991's A Portrait). This compilation featured singles and tracks from the band's first two albums Let It Bee and Honey Lingers.

== Track listing ==
1. "Don't Call Me Baby" (Bryn, Jones) - 3:05
2. "Monsters and Angels" (Bryn, Jones) - 3:38
3. "I Think I Love You" (T. Romeo) - 3:13
4. "I Say Nothing" (Bryn, Jones) - 3:24
5. "I Walk the Earth" (Nack) - 3:40
6. "Perfect Place" (Brooke, Bryn, Jones) - 3:33
7. "Man in the Moon" (Brooke, Bryn) - 3:12
8. "Sorrow Floats" (Bryn) - 4:16
9. "The Beat of Love" (Brooke, Bryn, Nack) - 4:02
10. "Adonis Blue" (Bryn, Jones) - 3:40
11. "Look at Me" (Bryn, Jones) - 3:03
12. "Just Like You" (Brett, Bryn, Jones) - 3:22
13. "What You Have Is Enough" (Bryn) - 2:33
14. "Say It" (Bryn, Jones) - 2:28
15. "Oh Love" (Brooke, Jones) - 2:58
16. "Beauty to My Eyes" (Bryn) - 3:01
17. "Trust Me" (Bryn) - 3:17
18. "There's a Barbarian in the Back of My Car" (Bryn, Zodiac Mindwarp) - 2:35
