= This Is Lone Justice: The Vaught Tapes, 1983 =

Compilation album by Lone Justice
- Released: January 14, 2014
- Recorded: December 1983
- Studio: Suite 16, Van Nuys, California
- Genre: Country rock
- Length: 33:05
- Label: Omnivore
- Producer: Lone Justice

Lone Justice chronology
The Best of Lone Justice (2003)	This Is Lone Justice: The Vaught Tapes, 1983 (2014)	Live at the Palomino, 1983 (2019)

Professional ratings
Aggregate scores
Source	Rating
Metacritic	80/100
Review scores
Source	Rating
All About Jazz	4/5 stars
AllMusic	4/5 stars
American Songwriter	4/5 stars
Blurt	4/5 stars
PopMatters	6/10 stars

This Is Lone Justice: The Vaught Tapes, 1983 is a compilation album by American band Lone Justice, released in January 2014 by Omnivore Recordings. The twelve songs include nine previously unissued tracks recorded at Suite 16 Studios, Los Angeles, in December 1983 by engineer David Vaught with direct to two-track tape and no overdubs. "Rattlesnake Mama", "Working Man's Blues" and "This World Is Not My Home" had previously been released on the 1999 compilation album This World Is Not My Home.

Accompanying the music was an essay by guitarist Ryan Hedgecock, a remembrance of Vaught written by bassist Marvin Etzioni, liner notes by veteran L.A. music journalist Chris Morris and a shout-out to the band from Dolly Parton, to whom lead singer Maria McKee was frequently compared.

== Track listing ==
Writing credits adapted from the album's liner notes.

No.	Title	Writer(s)	Length
1.	"Nothing Can Stop My Loving You"	George Jones, Roger Miller	1:56
2.	"Jackson"	Billy Edd Wheeler, Jerry Leiber	3:01
3.	"Soap, Soup and Salvation"	Maria McKee	4:11
4.	"The Grapes of Wrath"	Marvin Etzioni	2:31
5.	"Dustbowl Depression Time"	McKee	2:46
6.	"Rattlesnake Mama"	Traditional	1:44
7.	"Vigilante"	McKee, Ryan Hedgecock, Etzioni	1:52
8.	"Working Man's Blues"	Merle Haggard	2:32
9.	"Cactus Rose"	McKee, Etzioni	3:47
10.	"When Love Comes Home to Stay"	Hedgecock	3:06
11.	"Cotton Belt"	McKee	3:08
12.	"This World Is Not My Home"	Traditional	2:31

== Personnel ==
Adapted from the album's liner notes.

Lone Justice

- Maria McKee – vocals, guitar
- Ryan Hedgecock – guitar, vocals
- Marvin Etzioni – bass, vocals
- Don Heffington – drums

Production

- Lone Justice – producer
- David Vaught – engineer
- Bernie Grundman – mastering
