= Live at the Palomino, 1983 =

Live album by Lone Justice
- Released: 12 April 2019
- Recorded: 22 October 1983
- Venue: The Palomino Club, Los Angeles
- Genre: Country rock; country music; alternative country; cowpunk
- Length: 32:24
- Label: Omnivore Recordings
- Producer: Marvin Etzioni

Lone Justice chronology
This Is Lone Justice: The Vaught Tapes, 1983 (2014)	Live at the Palomino, 1983 (2019)

Live at the Palomino, 1983 is a live album by American country rock band Lone Justice, released in 2019 by Omnivore Recordings. It was recorded in October 1983 at the Palomino Club in North Hollywood, Los Angeles, by an early Lone Justice lineup consisting of Maria McKee, Ryan Hedgecock, Marvin Etzioni and Don Willens. The live album features songs from their yet to be recorded debut album, 1985's Lone Justice, coupled with classic country covers, and songs which, years later, have appeared in demo form on various compilation albums. The two-track live recording was discovered more than 30 years later by Hedgecock and issued with full cooperation from the band.

== Critical reception ==
Professional ratings
Review scores
Source	Rating
AllMusic	3.5/5 stars
Elmore Magazine	92/100
The Vinyl District	A−

In his review for All About Jazz, Doug Collette saw the band as one of the originators of the cowpunk movement in the 1980s, "infusing roots music with a punk attitude while still maintaining the legitimacy of both genres." He felt that the band "bristles with an energy and sense of purpose bordering on missionary zeal." Collette concluded that "injecting a palpable sense of irreverence into songs like 'Drugstore Cowboy,' the band avoids the sanctimonious solemnity of peers and successors."

Peter Lindblad of Elmore Magazine described the band's performance as "inspired, daring and reckless", writing that "every song goes off like a lit pack of firecrackers in a hot, stuffy room." He called the two-track recording "imperfect" and "a little dusty and dirty", containing "a closeness that is inescapable, almost claustrophobic."

AllMusic's Mark Deming wrote, "Ryan Hedgecock's lead guitar is full of twangy fire without pointless showboating, and Maria McKee, only 19 years old on the evening in question, sounds like a force of nature, blessed with a remarkable voice and the courage to use it." He added that "Etzioni and Hedgecock's harmonies are spot-on."

== Track listing ==
Adapted from the album's liner notes.

No.	Title	Writer(s)	Length
1.	"You Are the Light"	Marvin Etzioni	3:31
2.	"Drugstore Cowboy"	Maria McKee	2:03
3.	"How Lonesome Life Has Been"	Ryan Hedgecock, McKee	2:38
4.	"The Train"	Hedgecock	2:36
5.	"Dustbowl Depression Time"	McKee	2:55
6.	"Cotton Belt"	McKee	2:37
7.	"This World Is Not My Home (I'm Just a Passin' Through)"	Traditional	2:45
8.	"I See It"	Etzioni	2:49
9.	"Working Man's Blues"	Merle Haggard	3:02
10.	"The Grapes of Wrath"	Etzioni	1:51
11.	"Working Late"	Etzioni	3:18
12.	"Jackson"	Billy Edd Wheeler, Jerry Leiber	2:19

== Personnel ==
Adapted from the album's liner notes.

Lone Justice

- Maria McKee – guitar, vocals
- Ryan Hedgecock – guitar, vocals
- Marvin Etzioni – bass, vocals
- Don Willens – drums

Production

- Marvin Etzioni – producer, album assembly, album sequencing, liner notes
- Adam Pike – post production
- Bernie Grundman – tape transfer, mastering
- Gary Leonard – cover photography, handwritten type
- Ryan's Mom – photography (Palomino)
- Greg Allen – art direction, design
- Ryan Hedgecock – album assembly, album sequencing, liner notes
- Produced for release by Greg Allen and Cheryl Pawelski
- Project assistance by Audrey Bilger, Dutch Cramblitt, Lee Lodyga and Brad Rosenberger
