= Gregg Sutton =

American musician (1949–2023)

- Born: July 1, 1949
- Died: October 22, 2023 (aged 74) Los Angeles, California, U.S.
- Genres: Pop; soul; blues; rock; country
- Occupations: Musician; songwriter
- Instrument: Bass guitar
- Years active: 1974–2023
- Labels: Geffen; Arista; A&M; EMI; Columbia

Gregg Sutton (July 1, 1949 – October 22, 2023) was an American musician, songwriter, guitarist, singer, and bassist, who lived in Los Angeles. He was a member of the country rock band Lone Justice from 1985 to 1987, and wrote or co-wrote songs for other artists.

== Career ==
Sutton joined Lone Justice as their bassist shortly after the release of their debut album, and appeared on their 1986 album Shelter.

Sutton wrote hits for Sam Brown ("Stop!"), Joe Cocker ("Tonight" and seven others) and contributed songs to Aurical, Tal Bachman, Matraca Berg, Bloodline, Joe Bonamassa, Ane Brun, Eric Burdon, Charles & Eddie, Papa John Creach, Shannon Curfman, Billy Ray Cyrus, John Farnham, Andy Griffith, Beth Hart, Jeff Healey, The Human League, Teresa James, Tom Jones, Lone Justice, Chris LeDoux, Del McCoury, Maria McKee, John McVie, Nelson, The Nighthawks, O-Town, Carla Olson, Thick Pigeon, Jason Ringenberg, Timothy B. Schmit, Percy Sledge, Heather Small, Ray Stevens, Curtis Stigers (together with Shelly Peiken), Andrew Strong, Swirl 360, Chris Thompson, and Edgar Winter.

During the 1980s, he played bass for Bob Dylan on Real Live (1984). He also played bass for Barry Goldberg, Sass Jordan, Carla Olson, Mick Taylor, Dave Alvin, Coup de Grace, The Pets, KGB (along with Carmine Appice), Tony Gilkyson, Avery Sharpe and Katy Moffatt.

In 1979, Sutton was the musical director for Andy Kaufman's show at Carnegie Hall. He was also featured in the 1980 movie Andy Kaufman Plays Carnegie Hall and as an actor in the motion picture Man on the Moon, starring Jim Carrey. He appeared in the 2015 documentary Kaufman Lives.

Sutton had a sub-publishing deal with Supreme Songs Ltd, and several of his songs were used in a number of television series. He embarked on a UK and European tour in November 2019.

== Death ==
Sutton died on October 22, 2023, at the age of 74.
