= Iron Flowers (Grey DeLisle album) =

Studio album by Grey DeLisle
- Released: June 14, 2005
- Recorded: June 25 – October 30, 2004
- Genre: Country
- Label: Sugar Hill Records
- Producer: Marvin Etzioni

Grey DeLisle chronology
The Graceful Ghost (2004)	Iron Flowers (2005)

Professional ratings
Review scores
Source	Rating
Allmusic	link
PopMatters	(9/10) link

Iron Flowers is an album released by country/folk artist and voice actress Grey DeLisle; her fourth release. It comes in an Enhanced CD format, which includes "Analog Journey into Iron Flowers". This enhanced content includes interviews with DeLisle detailing the album's tracks and the recording of them.

== Track listing ==
1. "Bohemian Rhapsody" (Freddie Mercury) (3:43)
2. "Joanna" (DeLisle) (4:25)
3. "Right Now" (DeLisle, Etzioni) (3:33)
4. "Who Made You King?" (Etzioni, Lorber) (4:40)
5. "God's Got It" (Charlie Jackson) (2:48)
6. "The Bloody Bucket" (DeLisle, Etzioni) (3:56)
7. "Iron Flowers" (DeLisle, Hammond) (3:59)
8. "Blueheart" (DeLisle, The Amazements) (3:46)
9. "Sweet Little Bluebird" (DeLisle, Etzioni) (3:20)
10. "Inside Texas" (DeLisle, Etzioni) (5:10)

== Personnel ==
- Grey DeLisle - autoharp, vocals
- Marvin Etzioni - acoustic guitar, mandolin, electric guitar, rhythm guitar, production, Mandola, Marxophone, Casio, guitar engineer, ARP Odyssey, electric Mando-cello
- Sheldon Gomberg - upright bass
- Murry Hammond - acoustic guitar, bass guitar
- Don Heffington - castanets, drums, maracas, snare drums, sleigh bells
- Greg Leisz - pedal steel guitar
- Dave Mattacks - drums
- The Amazements - Elon Etzioni, Brendon Morrison, Liam Morrison
