= This World Is Not My Home =

This World Is Not My Home may refer to:

- This World Is Not My Home (Onward to Olympas album)
- This World Is Not My Home (Lone Justice album)
