= Chris Morris (music writer) =

American music writer

Chris Morris is a music writer based in Los Angeles, California. He is known for his coverage of L.A.'s independent scene in the 1970s and 1980s, which made him "a central voice in Left Coast music journalism." He has also written well-received books on Los Lobos and Bob Dylan.

== Career ==
=== Radio and journalism ===
Morris grew up in Chicago. His father was the program director for WTTW, Chicago's public television station. As a teenager in 1968, Chris worked as an associate in WTTW's publicity department. He grew to love blues music and hosted a weekly blues show while working as a late-night FM DJ in Madison, Wisconsin. That was on WIBA-FM, also known as "Radio Free Madison," with all the DJs in control of their own programming. Morris had worked there part-time in the early '70s and moved back to Madison to take a full-time job with the 50,000-watt station. His shows also included R&B and rockabilly, as well as Patti Smith—and The Ramones, whose debut album got Morris fired when he played it in late 1976.

Morris relocated to Los Angeles on Good Friday, 1977. He became music critic for the Los Angeles Reader from 1978 to 1996. During this period and beyond, his writing helped build and preserve the reputation of leading L.A. bands that sprang up around that time.

Morris showed his eclectic knowledge of musical forms in writing for Rolling Stone about Uprising, the last album that Bob Marley released in his lifetime. That was also evidenced by his 1981 feature on Echo and the Bunnymen. For the same magazine, he returned to the realm of reggae and African popular music in covering the 1984 tour co-starring Black Uhuru and King Sunny Adé.

Morris briefly left the Los Angeles Reader to work for local music trade weekly Music Connection. He and several other writers resigned in September 1988, however, in protest against the firing of their colleague, senior editor Bud Scoppa.

In addition, Morris was senior writer for Billboard in Los Angeles, where he worked from 1986 to 2004, writing a weekly column about independent music for 12 years. Shortly thereafter, he joined Billboard's sister publication, The Hollywood Reporter, as music editor. However, he was let go in a major restructuring in 2006.

Morris contributed a bi-weekly column, "Sonic Nation," to the alternative weekly LA CityBeat. His writing has also appeared in the Los Angeles Times, Spin, Mojo, LA Weekly, Chicago Reader, and other publications. These outlets included the websites Trunkworthy, Night Flight, and Music Aficionado.

His time with CityBeat ended in 2008. Meanwhile, he continued to serve as a DJ under the "Indie 103.1" format of KDLD, hosting a show devoted to roots music called "Watusi Rodeo". After it was canceled in 2009, the show later resurfaced on Scion Radio 17 from Scion Audio/Visual.

In 2011, while he was working for Scion Radio 17, Morris hosted a panel discussion at the Grammy Museum at L.A. Live as part of the Cleveland Confidential book tour. The panelists were Cheetah Chrome, Mike Hudson of The Pagans, former Hollywood Records president Bob Pfeifer, and David Thomas.

Morris is currently a contributing writer at Variety. Among other things, he is a prolific composer of obituaries of prominent figures in the music world. In recent years, his subjects have included Mo Ostin, Mark Lanegan, Ronnie Spector, Charlie Watts, Dusty Hill, Mary Wilson, Charley Pride, Peter Green, Charlie Daniels, John Prine, and Kenny Rogers. His obits also cover film stars such as Rutger Hauer.

=== Liner notes ===
As an authority on L.A.'s indie scene, Morris was chosen to write liner notes for several compilations and reissues of works by pivotal bands and artists of the era. They included:

- The Blasters: The Blasters Collection (1991 best-of anthology) and American Music (Hightone Records' 1997 reissue of the band's debut album).
- Jeffrey Lee Pierce: Wildweed (1994 reissue on Triple X Records of the 1985 album).
- Los Lobos: El Cancionero Mas y Mas (2000 four-CD box set).
- Lone Justice: This World Is Not My Home (1999 anthology) and This Is Lone Justice: The Vaught Tapes, 1983 (2014 archival release).
- Circle Jerks: Wild in the Streets (2022 40th anniversary reissue). For the 8,200-word essay, Morris conducted new interviews with founding band members Keith Morris, Greg Hetson, and Lucky Lehrer. (Keith Morris—no relation—jokingly referred to the writer as his "bastard dad" in the singer's memoir My Damage.)

An especially colorful example of his words may be found in the liner notes for Pigus Drunkus Maximus (1987), the only album from Top Jimmy & The Rhythm Pigs, another band central to that scene.

The 1991 boxed set Howlin' Wolf: The Chess Box featured an "unusually complete" accompanying booklet, with the introduction by Morris providing a tribute and an overview. Eventually, in 2020, this compilation was recognized by the Blues Hall of Fame.

Morris annotated Rhino Records' punk rock boxed set No Thanks! The '70s Punk Rebellion (2003). In 2004, he received a 47th Annual Grammy Awards nomination for best album notes.

=== Books and films ===
Morris provided the text for Beyond and Back: The Story of X (1983). He also held a number of full-time jobs in publicity, and one of his assignments came from Skouras Pictures, distributor of another X project, the documentary X: The Unheard Music.

His book Los Lobos: Dream in Blue was published by University of Texas Press in 2015. It was the first book-length critical history of the veteran band from East L.A. The Lincoln Journal-Star called it "a much needed, insightful look." Record Collector News observed that Morris was the ideal teller of this tale. Latin American Music Review cited its "journalistic, accessible style" and viewed it as an excellent companion text for other studies of Mexican-American popular music.

The following year brought the release of Together Through Life: A Personal Journey with the Music of Bob Dylan (Rothco Press). In 2017, American Songwriter called Morris a gifted writer and the book "an enlightening exploration." A few years later, another American Songwriter piece by the same columnist led off a series about "Favorite Bob Dylan Books" with an in-depth examination of Together Through Life that focused on the "informed passion" of Morris and his distinctive approach to the subject.

Morris also made major contributions to the following histories:

- Make The Music Go Bang!: The Early L.A. Punk Scene (1997)
- Under the Big Black Sun (2016)
- More Fun in the New World (2019)

The audiobook editions of the latter two works also featured the voices of the contributors.

In addition, Morris appeared on screen providing insights in two documentaries:

- We Jam Econo: The Story of The Minutemen (2005)
- Punk's Not Dead (2007)

He was chosen to write the essay accompanying The Criterion Collection's edition of Border Radio, a film that also sprang from the L.A. indie scene and featured rockers in acting roles.
