= Dog's eye =

Dog's eye may refer to:

- The eye of a dog
- A meat pie (British and Australian rhyming slang)
- Dog's Eye View, an American rock band
