= Sex & Misery =

- US edition cover

Studio album by Voice of the Beehive
- Released: February 12, 1996 (UK); April 16, 1996 (United States)
- Recorded: August 1993 – January 1994, May–November 1994
- Genres: Alternative, pop
- Length: 45:59
- Labels: East West (UK); Discovery / Warner (USA)
- Producer: Peter-John Vettese

Voice of the Beehive chronology
A Portrait (1991)	Sex & Misery (1996)	Best Of (1997)

UK edition cover

Singles from Sex & Misery
- 1. "Angel Come Down" Released: August 1, 1995 (UK); 2. "Scary Kisses" Released: January 5 (UK), March 26 (USA), 1996; 3. "Heavenly" Released: May 7, 1996 (UK); 4. "So Hard" Released: August 6, 1996 (USA)

Professional ratings
Review scores
Source	Rating
Allmusic	2.5/5 stars
Billboard	(favorable)
Entertainment Weekly	C+
Los Angeles Times	3/4 stars
The War Against Silence	(favorable)

Sex & Misery is the third and final studio album from UK-based alternative rock band Voice of the Beehive, which consisted at that point of founding members Melissa Brooke Belland and Tracey Bryn. Its production and release delayed due to personal and professional difficulties, the album was first distributed by East West Records in early 1996, almost five years after their previous studio effort, Honey Lingers. With just two of four released singles barely breaking onto the charts, the album was considered a critical and commercial disappointment and proved to be Voice of the Beehive's final recording. None of the tracks from Sex & Misery appear on the group's Best Of compilation, issued the following year by their original label, London Records.

== Album history ==
The working title Disastrous Relationships, Disillusionment, Depression & Death serves for a concise description of the turbulent circumstances under which Voice of the Beehive composed Sex & Misery. In the months following the release of their second album, Melissa Brooke Belland and Tracey Bryn, along with bandmates Martin Brett and Mike Jones, grew increasingly frustrated with London Records' inability and refusal to promote and market their music. The label's intrusive management practices and interference with various elements of production also contributed to mounting tension and conflict in its dealings with the group. Additionally, Bryn and Belland were both going through painful breakups of their respective long-term relationships and coping with the death of several close friends around this time. Even though the process of crafting a new album had tentatively been initiated, the group resolved to negotiate a release from their contract and seek out a record deal elsewhere.

Drummer Daniel Woodgate had departed the band in 1992, to return to his former position with Madness and, while trying to find a new label, Brett and Jones also went their separate ways, leaving Belland and Bryn as Voice of the Beehive's only remaining members. The pair eventually signed a contract with East West Records and, assisted by producer Peter-John Vettese, resumed work on the album. Having recently endured so much loss and hardship, Bryn and Belland wanted to reinvent their image; consequently, Sex & Misery marked a departure in certain respects from their established musical style. With the album already long since completed, the first single, "Angel Come Down", was released in the UK on August 1, 1995 in order to gauge response to Voice of the Beehive's new sound. However, East West did not secure adequate publicity or circulation to reach beyond the group's fanbase, so when the song inevitably failed to gain traction, the label determined that the album was not viable and pulled it from the release slate.

Once again confounded by a record label's lack of support and loss of interest, Belland and Bryn relocated from London to their native Los Angeles in pursuit of other opportunities. East West finally did decide to release Sex & Misery in the UK a couple of months later on February 12, 1996, where it received scant notice. Another Warner Music subsidiary, Discovery Records, picked up the album and released it in the US on April 16 of that same year. The single "Scary Kisses," which was closer to the group's original sound, caught on at a few prominent Top 40 radio stations and became a modest hit, but Discovery neglected to capitalise on its success, neither releasing a corresponding music video nor booking Voice of the Beehive on high-profile gigs or a concert tour. As a direct result, Sex & Misery quickly lost its momentum, and soon thereafter the label opted to end its contract with the group.

== Track listing ==
No.	Title	Writer(s)	Length
1.	"Scary Kisses"	Tracey Bryn, Peter-John Vettese	4:12
2.	"New Day"	Melissa Brooke Belland, Bryn, Vettese	4:05
3.	"Angel Come Down"	Bryn, Vettese	3:54
4.	"Moon of Dust"	Bryn, Mike Jones	3:58
5.	"I'm Still in Love"	Bryn, Vettese	4:27
6.	"Love Locked Inside"	Bryn, Zodiac Mindwarp	4:07
7.	"Playing House"	Martin Brett, Bryn	3:27
8.	"Heavenly"	Bryn, Jones	3:31
9.	"Blue in Paradise"	Bryn, Andy Partridge	4:18
10.	"So Hard"	Belland, Bryn	4:54
11.	"Moonblind"	Bryn, David Motion	5:06

== Personnel ==
- Melissa Brooke Belland - lead and backing vocals
- Tracey Bryn - lead and backing vocals
- Jolyon Dixon - guitar
- Mark "Tufty" Evans - recording engineer and mixer, guitar
- Jon Kelly - recording engineer and mixer ("Angel Come Down")
- Caroline Lavelle - cello ("Angel Come Down")
- Tom Lord-Alge - recording engineer and mixer ("Scary Kisses" and "New Day")
- Keith More - guitar
- Stuart Ross - drums
- Steve Sidelnyk - percussion ("Angel Come Down")
- Peter-John Vettese - producer, keyboards
- John Wakefield - bass

== Chart performance ==
Single	Chart	Peak position	Date
"Angel Come Down"	UK Singles Chart	86	September 23, 1995
"Scary Kisses"	Billboard Hot 100	77	June 8, 1996

== Sources ==
- The Beehive—Voice of the Beehive Online: Biography
- Ball, Joann D. (28 August 1996). Gajarsky, Bob (ed.). "Interview: Voice of the Beehive's Tracey Bryn and Melissa Belland". Consumable Online (85). Hoboken, NJ.
- Harris, Will (7 July 2008). "Voice of the Beehive, Sex & Misery". Hooks 'n' You. Popdose.
- Muzer, Al (26 June 1996). "Voice of the Beehive: Scary Kissing". The Aquarian Weekly. Little Falls, NJ.
