= Don't Call Me Baby (disambiguation) =

"Don't Call Me Baby" is a 1999 song by Madison Avenue.

Don't Call Me Baby may also refer to:

- "Don't Call Me Baby" (Kreesha Turner song), 2008
- "Don't Call Me Baby" (Voice of the Beehive song), 1988
- "Don't Call Me Baby", a song by Geri Halliwell from Scream If You Wanna Go Faster
