= Two Graduated Jiggers =

Studio album by Jon Wayne
- Released: 2000
- Recorded: 1993–1999, at Tandouri Sound, California
- Genre: Cowpunk
- Label: Waco's Goats
- Producer: Jon Wayne

Jon Wayne chronology
Texas Funeral (1985)	Two Graduated Jiggers (2000)

Professional ratings
Review scores
Source	Rating
Sound & Vision	4/5 stars

Two Graduated Jiggers is the second album by Jon Wayne. It was released in 2000 via Waco's Goats.

== Critical reception ==
No Depression called the album "as darkly foul and funny a masterwork as its predecessor," writing that Wayne "grunts, warbles, and slurs lyrics like a low-voiced bourboned-up Walter Brennan with Tourette’s."

== Track listing ==
1. Texas Fuel Injection - 0:57 (Jimbo)
2. Generator - 3:51 (Don Heffington)
3. Texas Moquine Bird - 2:01 (J. Wayne)
4. I Caught Me A Squirrel - 1:13 (J. Wayne & Jimbo)
5. I Do Drive Truck - 2:16 (J. Wayne)
6. Time To Drink Whiskey - 3:36 (Don Heffington)
7. Texas Drum Cooker - 2:47 (J. Wayne & Jimbo)
8. Texas Learning Center - 0:17 (J. Wayne)
9. Country Porno - 2:15 (J. Wayne)
10. Old MacDonald - 0:24 (Trad.)
11. Donkey-Mule - 2:02 (J. Wayne & Jimbo)
12. Mandolin Man - 3:59 (Marvin Etzioni)
13. Death And Texas - 2:18 (J. Wayne)
14. Rock It Billy - 2:03 (Jimbo)
15. Las Vegas Audition - 5:06 (J. Wayne)
16. Texas Jackin' Ledge - 2:57 (J. Wayne & T. Turlock)
17. Jimbo's Clown Room - 0:09 (Jimbo)
18. Balloon-Indian Girl - 0:51 (J. Wayne)
19. Texas Genealogy - 6:15 (J. Wayne)
20. International Squirrel - 2:54 (J. Wayne & Jibo)
21. Texas Assonance - 14:39 (J. Wayne)

== Personnel ==
- Jon Wayne: guitar, organs, piano, vocal
- Jimbo: drums, tuba, vocal
- Earnest Beauvine: lead guitar, horns, pedal steels
- Timmy Turlock: bass
- Jon Wayne: record producer
- Charlie McGovern: cover layout
- Cheryl Swarens-Vaught: cover photos
- John Cerney: billboard
- Spleef: mixdown
- Annie Harvey: band photos

== Additional notes ==
Recorded 1993 through 1999 at Tandouri Sound, CA
