= Everything Falls Apart (song) =

1996 single by Dog's Eye View

Single by Dog's Eye View

from the album Happy Nowhere
- B-side: "What Fox"; "Small Wonders" (acoustic); "Shine" (demo)
- Released: January 1996
- Length: 3:54
- Label: Columbia
- Songwriter: Peter Stuart
- Producers: Jim "Jimbo" Barton; Peter Stuart

Dog's Eye View singles chronology
| "Everything Falls Apart" (1996) | "Small Wonders" (1996) |

Everything Falls Apart is a song by American rock band Dog's Eye View, written by lead vocalist Peter Stuart. The song is the lead single from Dog's Eye View's debut album, Happy Nowhere, released in January 1996 by Columbia Records. It received considerable airplay on radio, MTV and VH1, reaching the top 40 on multiple US Billboard charts. Internationally, the single charted in Canada and New Zealand, peaking at numbers five and 41, respectively.

== Chart performance ==
"Everything Falls Apart" peaked at number 66 on the US Billboard Hot 100 as a double A-side with "Small Wonders". It also reached number eight on the Billboard Top 40/Mainstream chart and number one on the Billboard Triple-A ranking. Outside the US, "Everything Falls Apart" peaked at number five in Canada, where it ended 1996 as the country's 31st-most-successful single, and number 41 in New Zealand.

== Music video ==
The music video for "Everything Falls Apart" was placed on regular rotation on MTV on February 5, 1996.

== Track listings ==
European CD single

1. "Everything Falls Apart"
2. "What Fox" (LP outtake)
3. "Small Wonders" (acoustic)
4. "Shine" (original demo)

Australian CD single

1. "Everything Falls Apart"
2. "Small Wonders" (acoustic)
3. "Shine" (original demo)

== Charts ==
=== Weekly charts ===
| Chart (1996) | Peak position |
|---|---|
| Canada Top Singles (RPM) | 5 |
| Canada Adult Contemporary (RPM) | 12 |
| New Zealand (Recorded Music NZ) | 41 |
| US Billboard Hot 100 with "Small Wonders" | 66 |
| US Adult Top 40 (Billboard) | 17 |
| US Album Rock Tracks (Billboard) | 18 |
| US Modern Rock Tracks (Billboard) | 19 |
| US Top 40/Mainstream (Billboard) | 8 |
| US Triple-A (Billboard) | 1 |
| US Cash Box Top 100 | 61 |

=== Year-end charts ===
| Chart (1996) | Position |
|---|---|
| Canada Top Singles (RPM) | 31 |
| Canada Adult Contemporary (RPM) | 97 |
| US Mainstream Rock Tracks (Billboard) | 59 |
| US Modern Rock Tracks (Billboard) | 92 |
| US Top 40/Mainstream (Billboard) | 31 |
| US Triple-A (Billboard) | 5 |

== Release history ==
| Region | Date | Format(s) | Label(s) | Ref. |
|---|---|---|---|---|
| United States | January 1996 | Alternative radio | Columbia | |
| United States | February 20, 1996 | Contemporary hit radio | Columbia | |
