= Texas Funeral =

Studio album by Jon Wayne
- Released: 1985
- Genre: Alt-country, cowpunk
- Label: Hybrid Records
- Producer: Jon Wayne

Jon Wayne chronology
Texas Funeral (1985)	Two Graduated Jiggers (2000)

Texas Funeral is the first album by Jon Wayne, originally released by Hybrid Records in 1985. The album was released on CD in 1992 by Cargo Records/Fist Puppet, and was reissued on vinyl in 2010 by Jack White's label Third Man Records.

"Mr. Egyptian" was released as a 7" single in 1992, featuring non-album B-side "Orange Blossom Special".

The title track was used in the movie From Dusk till Dawn, thanks to screenplay writer Quentin Tarantino who was a fan of the album. Tarantino originally wanted to use the song in his own Pulp Fiction but couldn't get in touch with the band at the time.

Australian band The Cruel Sea incorporated some of the lyrics from "Texas Jailcell" in their own song "Better Get a Lawyer", which got into the Australian Top 50 in November 1994. David Vaught (aka Jon Wayne) received a co-writer credit.

== Track listing ==
All songs written by Jon Wayne, except where noted.

=== Original LP ===
Side A

1. "But I've Got Texas"
2. "Texas Funeral"
3. "Mr. Egyptian"
4. "Texas Cyclone"
5. "Texas Wine" (Jimbo, Jon Wayne)
6. "You And The Kitten"
7. "Is That Justice?"

Side B

1. "Truckin'"
2. "Shades"
3. "Texas Jailcell"
4. "Apple Schnapps" (recorded live at the Anticlub, Los Angeles; courtesy Throne Video, 1985)
5. "Texas Polka"
6. "Texas Studio"

=== 1992 CD/2010 LP version ===
The CD version featured slightly different mixes/edits, reshuffled track order, two extra songs and replaced a live recording of "Apple Schnapps" with a studio version. The same tracklist was reproduced on 2010 LP by Third Man Records.

1. "But I've Got Texas" - 1:55
2. "Texas Funeral" - 2:43
3. "Mr. Egyptian" - 2:36
4. "Texas Cyclone" - 0:45
5. "Texas Jailcell" - 3:19
6. "Workin' Man's Blues" (Merle Haggard) - 2:54
7. "Shades" - 1:27
8. "Texas Wine" (Jimbo, Jon Wayne) - 2:50
9. "Is That Justice?" - 1:50
10. "Texas Polka" - 2:07
11. "You And The Kitten" - 2:34
12. "Apple Schnapps" * - 2:00
13. "Truckin'" - 1:35
14. "One Hundred And Fifty-One Owl Caricatures" - 4:38
15. "Texas Studio" - 6:48

== Personnel ==
- Jon Wayne (David Vaught) - vocals, guitars, bass, piano, production, engineering
- Jimbo (Jim Goodall) - drums, voice, design
- Earnest Beauvine (Doug Livingston) - guitar
- Billy Bob (Bruce Rhodewalt) - bass
- Spike Stewart - photography

== Additional notes ==
Catalogue: (CD) Cargo Records/Fist Puppet 001
