= Peter Stuart =

American singer

- Genres: Adult alternative; pop rock; folk rock
- Occupations: Singer-songwriter; musician
- Instruments: Vocals; guitar
- Labels: Columbia; Vanguard

Peter Stuart is an American singer-songwriter and family therapist. Stuart is the founder and lead singer of the band Dog's Eye View, which is best known for its 1996 single, "Everything Falls Apart". In 2002, he released a solo album entitled Propeller.

== Biography ==
=== Early life ===
Stuart is a native of Glen Head, New York, on Long Island, His father died when he was eight years old, and the loss of his father was the topic of his first song.

Stuart studied film at Northwestern University in Illinois, where he was a member of the Delta Tau Delta college fraternity. Stuart graduated from Northwestern in 1989.

=== Early career ===
Stuart began his music career by performing in small venues, including clubs, coffee houses and college campuses.

Stuart formed the Chicago-based band Gravity Beavers in June 1990, with three other members – Arch Alcantara, Howie Kantoff and Doug Kenrick. John Schulte replaced Doug Kenrick in October 1990. The band changed its name to Monster in April 1991. Stuart listed the now defunct band's influences as Kansas, Cat Stevens, Neil Young and Jimi Hendrix in a January 1992 Chicago Tribune article. Stuart also said he became a fan of the Scottish alternative band, Del Amitri, when he was nineteen years old.

In 1994, Stuart joined the combined Tori Amos and Cracker tour as their opening act, appearing as an acoustic solo or occasionally with a backup bassist. Stuart next worked with Counting Crows in 1995, shortly before signing a contract with Columbia Records.

=== Dog's Eye View (1995–1999) ===
Stuart formed Dog's Eye View after signing with Columbia Records. He wrote all of the band's songs. Dog's Eye View released its debut album, Happy Nowhere, in October 1995. The album included the very successful 1996 single, Everything Falls Apart, which received wide airplay on radio and MTV. Stuart has said that he wrote the single in just fifteen minutes aboard an airplane while suffering the effects of a hangover.

Stuart sang with Dog's Eye View on Sweet Relief II: Gravity of the Situation, a 1996 tribute album dedicated to Vic Chesnutt. Other artists on the album included The Smashing Pumpkins and R.E.M.

=== Return to solo career (1999–2006) ===
Stuart left Dog's Eye View after the release of the band's second album, Daisy, a commercial disappointment, to pursue solo work. Stuart described production on Daisy, which was released in 1997, as an "albatross". He contributed songs for the Go-Go's 2001 studio album, God Bless The Go-Go's. He also co-wrote a track for Bon Jovi's 2000 album, Crush. Stuart also toured as an opening act for Live and Paula Cole during this time. Stuart followed Paula Cole's tour bus in a rental car during his gig as her opening act, which lasted for six weeks. After his acoustic opening performance, which averaged about 45-minutes before Cole took the stage, Stuart would sell his CDs, which contained just four songs. He returned to Counting Crows as their opening act in August 2000.

In 2000, Matchbox Twenty brought Stuart onto their tour as an opening act. Stuart also sung backing vocals for the band's 2000 album, Mad Season. Speaking to ABC News at the time, Matchbox Twenty vocalist Rob Thomas praised Stuart's yet unreleased album saying, "Peter's one of my dearest friends. His new album is great; it's f—king amazing. I can't believe no one has picked it up yet." (Stuart had been between labels at the time of Matchbox Twenty's tour and was pitching his solo album to various record labels.)

In 2001, Richard Lloyd of the rock band Television teamed with Stuart and drummer Chris Butler to record The Cover Doesn't Matter, which marked Lloyd's first solo album release since 1987.

Stuart's solo album, produced by Andrew Williams, was completed in early 2001. Stuart sold several thousand copies in 2001 and 2002 on tour while shopping the album to potential record labels. Stuart's album, named Propeller, was picked up by Vanguard Records, which released it on August 13, 2002. Propeller featured background vocals from Adam Duritz, frontman of Counting Crows, and Moon Zappa. Other guest artists who contributed to Stuart's solo debut included Mark Isham, D. J. Bonebrake, Greg Leisz, a multi-instrumentalist who added some guitar work, as well as David Immergluck and Charlie Gillingham, both of Counting Crows.

Billboard published a largely positive review of the album, writing in its August 24, 2002, edition: "When you find yourself humming along with an entire album and not wanting it to end, while also feeling that the artist is being completely honest and heartfelt, the project is definitely a special one. Stuart, the former Dog's Eye View frontman, accomplishes this difficult task with his solo debut."

=== Dog's Eye View reunion ===
After an extended hiatus, Dog's Eye View released a third album (also on Vanguard); the album was entitled Tomorrow Always Comes. It featured backing vocals by singers Jason Mraz and Kelly Moneymaker, as well as an appearance from Paul Doucette of Matchbox Twenty.

== Personal life ==
Stuart has obtained a master's degree in clinical psychology from Antioch University and is currently a family therapist in Los Angeles, California.
