= Unclogged =

Live album by X
- Released: 1995
- Recorded: 1994
- Venues: Noe Valley Ministries Presbyterian Church, San Francisco
- Genre: Acoustic rock
- Length: 51:16
- Label: Infidelity
- Producer: X

X chronology
Hey Zeus! (1987)	Unclogged (1995)	Beyond and Back: The X Anthology (1997)

Professional ratings
Review scores
Source	Rating
AllMusic	4/5 stars
Rolling Stone	2/5 stars

Unclogged is a live album by the American rock band X, released in 1995 by Infidelity Records. Recorded in 1994 at the Noe Valley Ministries Presbyterian Church in San Francisco, California, over two nights of performances, it presented acoustic arrangements of past X material, along with two new songs: "Lying in the Road" and "The Stage". The album's title was a play on the title of the MTV Unplugged television show and album series, which featured bands playing acoustic arrangements of their most popular songs.

== Track listing ==
No.	Title	Length
1.	"White Girl"	4:02
2.	"Because I Do"	3:05
3.	"Lying in the Road"	3:34
4.	"Unheard Music"	3:39
5.	"I Must Not Think Bad Thoughts"	4:50
6.	"Burning House of Love"	3:51
7.	"The Stage"	4:17
8.	"See How We Are"	4:49
9.	"True Love"	2:23
10.	"The Have Nots"	4:21
11.	"The World's a Mess, It's in My Kiss"	4:43
12.	"I See Red"	3:31
13.	"What's Wrong w/ Me"	4:11
Total length:		51:16

== Personnel ==
X

- D. J. Bonebrake – percussion, drums, vibraphone
- Exene Cervenka – vocals, acoustic guitar
- John Doe – vocals, bass, acoustic guitar
- Tony Gilkyson – acoustic and electric guitar, vocals

Technical

- Mark Shoffner - recording
- Kristian Hoffman - cover painting
