= Can't Cry Hard Enough =

Single by The Williams Brothers

from the album The Williams Brothers
- Released: February 1992
- Recorded: 1991
- Genre: Soft rock
- Length: 3:11
- Label: Warner Bros. Records
- Songwriters: David Williams, Marvin Etzioni
- Producer: David Kershenbaum

"Can't Cry Hard Enough" is a song written by David Williams and Marvin Etzioni. Williams originally recorded a version titled "I Can't Cry Hard Enough" with Victoria Williams for the latter's 1990 album Swing the Statue!. The following year, the version by both David and Andrew Williams as the Williams Brothers was released as a single. It peaked at number 42 on the US Billboard Hot 100 in early 1992. It also spent two weeks at number 29 on the Cash Box chart.

== Charts ==
Chart (1992)	Peak position
Canada Top Singles (RPM)	43
Canada Adult Contemporary (RPM)	21
US Billboard Hot 100	42
US Adult Contemporary (Billboard)	11
US Cash Box Top 100	29
