= Beautiful Dreamer (album) =

Beautiful Dreamer: The Songs of Stephen Foster

Compilation album by Various artists
- Released: July/August 2004
- Genre: Folk
- Label: American Roots Publishing/Emergent Music Marketing (now Thirty Tigers)

Professional ratings
Review scores
Source	Rating
allmusic	3.5/5 stars

Beautiful Dreamer is a compilation album comprising 18 songs originally penned by Stephen Foster. The album won the Grammy for Best Traditional Folk Album in 2005.

== Track listing ==
Beautiful Dreamer
No.	Title	Music	Length
1.	"Beautiful Dreamer"	Raul Malo	3:23
2.	"Slumber My Darling"	Alison Krauss with Yo Yo Ma, Edgar Meyer, Mark O'Connor	4:50
3.	"Don't Bet Money on the Shanghai"	BR5-49	2:24
4.	"Nelly Was a Lady"	Alvin Youngblood Hart	3:17
5.	"No One to Love"	Judith Edelman	3:48
6.	"Camptown Races"	The Duhks	3:00
7.	"My Old Kentucky Home, Goodnight"	John Prine	3:46
8.	"Autumn Waltz"	Henry Kaiser	2:54
9.	"In the Eye Abides the Heart"	Beth Nielsen Chapman	2:55
10.	"Old Folks at Home (Swanee River)"	David Ball	3:40
11.	"Oh, Susannah"	Michelle Shocked & Pete Anderson	3:46
12.	"Willie We Have Missed You"	Grey DeLisle	3:43
13.	"Hard Times (Come Again No More)"	Mavis Staples	4:13
14.	"Gentle Annie"	Bruce Robison & Ollabelle	4:05
15.	"I Dream of Jeanie with the Light Brown Hair"	Roger McGuinn	3:20
16.	"Ah! May The Red Rose Live Alway!"	Suzy Bogguss	4:10
17.	"Holiday Schottisch"	Will Barrow	2:05
18.	"Comrades, Fill No Glass for Me"	Ron Sexsmith	5:39
