= The Graceful Ghost =

Studio album by Grey DeLisle
- Released: March 16, 2004
- Genre: Country
- Label: Sugar Hill Records
- Producer: Marvin Etzioni

Grey DeLisle chronology
Bootlegger, Vol. 1 (2002)	''The Graceful Ghost'' (2004)	Iron Flowers (2005)

Professional ratings
Review scores
Source	Rating
The Music Box	3/5 link

The Graceful Ghost is Grey DeLisle's third album. It was released in 2004 on Sugar Hill Records, and is a tribute to Johnny Cash and June Carter Cash. The singer is credited as Grey De Lisle on this release.

== Track listing ==
All songs by Grey DeLisle, unless otherwise noted.

1. "The Jewel of Abilene" – 2:34
2. "Sweet Savior's Arms" – 3:32
3. "Sharecroppin' Man" – 2:56
4. "Walking In a Line" – 3:12
5. "The Maple Tree" – 3:42
6. "Tell Me True" – 2:28
7. "Turtle Dove" – 2:04
8. "Black Haired Boy" – 2:53
9. "Katy Allen" – 4:24
10. "This White Circle on My Finger" (Bainbridge, Lewis) – 3:13
11. "Sawyer" – 3:25
12. "Pretty Little Dreamer" – 2:05

== Personnel ==
- Grey DeLisle – Vocals, Autoharp, Music box
- Marvin Etzioni – Acoustic guitar, Guitar, Piano, Celeste, Producer, Slide guitar, Soloist, Banjolin, Music box, Double bass
- Sheldon Gomberg – Double bass
- Murry Hammond – Acoustic guitar, Guitar, Rhythm guitar, Harmonium, Vocals, Yodeling, Music box
- Greg Leisz – Chords

== Notes ==
- "This White Circle on My Finger" is a cover song originally recorded by Kitty Wells.
