= Tomorrow Always Comes =

Studio album by Dog's Eye View
- Released: 2005 or 2006
- Genre: Alternative, pop
- Length: 43:18
- Label: Vanguard Records
- Producer: Good Cop Bad Cop

Dog's Eye View chronology
Daisy (1997)	Tomorrow Always Comes (2005)

Tomorrow Always Comes is the third studio album from American rock band, Dog's Eye View. Tomorrow Always Comes marked the first new release by Dog's Eye View since their 1997 album, Daisy, following an extended hiatus. The album, released by Vanguard Records, is the band's most recent to date. Tomorrow Always Comes included the lead single, Gone Like Yesterday.

== Background ==
Dog's Eye View founder and vocalist Peter Stuart had left the band to pursue solo projects following their 1997 release, Daisy. In 2000, Stuart confirmed that he and Dog's Eye View had left Columbia Records, the label that had released their first two albums, citing lack of support for their second album. The band went on an extended hiatus during the early 2000s. In the interim, Stuart released his solo album, Propeller, on Vanguard Records in 2002.

Dog's Eye View reformed to record Tomorrow Always Comes, their third and most recent album.

== Production ==
Tomorrow Always Comes featured guest backing vocals by singers Jason Mraz and Kelly Moneymaker, as well as an appearance by Matchbox Twenty drummer and rhythm guitarist Paul Doucette.

== Track listing ==
1. "7 Wonders" – 2:53
2. "Gone Like Yesterday" – 3:49
3. "No Regrets" – 5:03
4. "Down" – 5:02
5. "Be Here Now" – 3:59
6. "K.I.S.S." – 3:17
7. "Answers" – 4:39
8. "Stars Are Falling" – 2:53
9. "Strange (Just the Way You Are)" – 4:03
10. "In Reverse (Terrified)" – 3:37
11. "Weightless" – 4:03
