= Jonah Tolchin =

American singer-songwriter

- Born: New Jersey, United States
- Genres: Blues, indie folk, folk rock, alternative country
- Occupations: Musician, songwriter, record producer
- Instruments: Voice, guitar
- Label: Yep Roc
- Website: www.jonahtolchin.com

Jonah Tolchin is an American singer-songwriter, musician, and New Jersey native. He performed at the Newport Folk Festival in 2012. Tolchin released his first full-length album, Criminal Man, independently in 2012. He is currently signed to Yep Roc Records through which he has released two albums.

== Musical career ==
When Tolchin was fifteen, Ronnie Earl heard him play at a music store and took him out to lunch and asked Jonah to play with him onstage. Tolchin says, "It was a really beautiful gesture. It was amazing to have that sort of validation from such a legend. I thought, 'I guess I can do something with this.'"

Tolchin continued to play music through high school with his band, Uncle Fran's Breakfast. When high school ended, he ventured out on his own, forsaking college for a chance in music.

In 2012, Tolchin released his first album, Criminal Man, named after the first song he ever wrote at the age of 15. The album was released independently, and received radio airplay. Soon after, Tolchin was asked to play at the Newport Folk Festival.

Tolchin followed Criminal Man with the 5 Dollar EP, his first collaboration with record producer Marvin Etzioni.

Tolchin signed with Yep Roc Records in 2014, and released his second full-length album, Clover Lane, in 2014. In August 2016, he released the album, Thousand Mile Night.

On November 8, 2018, Tolchin released a new single and official music video titled "The Grateful Song (Thanksgiving)", via Yep Roc Records. The video premiered on The Bluegrass Situation.

His most recent release is a track titled "Drift Away". The video for the single premiered on Twangville on January 24, 2019.

== Clover Lane ==
Clover Lane is the second studio album by Americana artist Jonah Tolchin. It was released July 1, 2014 through Yep Roc Records.

=== Backstory ===
The name for Tolchin's second album is the result of a coincidence that was realized when Tolchin met a mutual friend of Marvin Etzioni (producer of Clover Lane). Tolchin's parents had bought a house in New Jersey (on a street named Clover Lane) from the family of Etzioni's friend in 1996 and they remained there throughout Tolchin's childhood. Tolchin is a self-proclaimed deep thinker and believes this record serves as a “passionate manifestation of the cosmos in perfect harmony.” He described his childhood home on Clover Lane as “the center of the spider’s web from which the interconnected strands have been woven into these songs and recordings.” Tolchin created Clover Lane in Nashville alongside Etzioni and engineer Anderson East. The album was mixed in California by Sheldon Gomberg and mastered by Bernie Grundman. After being introduced to the Delta Blues by his father he became enamored with the electric blues which in turn led him to discover and embrace other traditional folk forms. Tolchin combines these influences in Clover Lane in order to create a piece of work that “bridges the gap between classic folk self-sufficiency and punk's DIY defiance with a uniquely poetic, openhearted sensibility at its core.”

=== Critical reception ===
Kim Ruehl from NPR Heavy Rotation said that Tolchin was “... A promising new artist who artfully occupies the gulf between old-school tradition and contemporary appropriation.”

An album review of Clover Lane from Uncut Magazine said that Tolchin's “finesse and maturity”.

Music review website Popmatters said that by the album taking “directions from Bourbon Street up to Beale Street and on to Maxwell Street, Jonah Tolchin’s Clover Lane deserves its rightful place on the map as a truly remarkable Americana/blues record.” The website also called Tolchin's work “foot-stomping, ragged and raw, Mississippi Delta music.”

Reviews touched upon Tolchin's ability to seemingly write and play years beyond his age. British popular culture website The Upcoming called Tolchin “the epitome of a young man with an old soul…” Writer Emily Burnham of Culture Shock (a subsidiary of Bangor Daily News) described the “maturity to his voice, songs and his guitar playing that definitely belies his age.”

=== Track list ===
No.	Title	Writer(s)	Length
1.	"Mockingbird"	Jonah Tolchin	2:59
2.	"Midnight Rain"	Jonah Tolchin	2:47
3.	"Hey Baby Blues"	Jonah Tolchin	3:57
4.	"Diamond Mind"	Jonah Tolchin	3:55
5.	"Atlantic Winds"	Jonah Tolchin	3:00
6.	"Mansion in Hollywood"	Jonah Tolchin	4:01
7.	"Low Life"	Jabi Shriki	3:50
8.	"Hybrid Automobile"	Jonah Tolchin	4:17
9.	"21st Century Girl"	Jonah Tolchin & Marvin Etzioni	3:16
10.	"Motel #9"	Jonah Tolchin & Lucas Hamren	5:45
11.	"I'll Be Gone"	Jonah Tolchin	2:56
Total length:			40:47

Personnel on the album included:

=== Musicians ===
- Acoustic Guitar, Harmonica – Jonah Tolchin (tracks: 1, 8)
- Banjo – Lucas Hamren (tracks: 10)
- Baritone Guitar – Marvin Etzioni (tracks: 7)
- Baritone Saxophone – Steve Berlin (tracks: 3)
- Bass Harmonica – Mickey Raphael (tracks: 9)
- Dobro – Lucas Hamren (tracks: 1), Marvin Etzioni (tracks: 3)
- Drums, Percussion – Evan Hutchings
- Electric Guitar – Marvin Etzioni (tracks: 6)
- Guitar – Lucas Hamren (tracks: 2, 4, 7, 9, 10)
- Handclaps – Marvin Etzioni (tracks: 5)
- Harmonica – Mickey Raphael (tracks: 5)
- Harmony Vocals – Anderson East (tracks: 10), John McCaughey (2) (tracks: 2, 7, 10), Lucas Hamren (tracks: 8, 9), Marvin Etzioni (tracks: 8, 9)
- Mandolin – Marvin Etzioni (tracks: 4, 7)
- Piano – Lucas Hamren (tracks: 6)
- Piano [Rhodes] – Lucas Hamren (tracks: 3,8)
- Steel Guitar – Chris Scruggs (tracks: 2. 4, 10)
- Upright Piano, Electric Bass, Baritone Guitar – Michael Rinne (tracks: 9,10)
- Vocals, Electric Guitar – Jonah Tolchin (tracks: 1, 3, 5. 8)

=== Production ===
- Produced by Marvin Etzioni
- Mixed by Sheldon Gomberg
- Mastered by Bernie Grundman

== Thousand Mile Night ==
Thousand Mile Night is the third studio album released by Tolchin. It was released on August 4, 2016, through Yep Roc Records.

=== Backstory ===
Tolchin's Thousand Mile Night was recorded at the FAME Recording Studios in Muscle Shoals, Alabama. The album gets its name from the 1,000 mile drive Tolchin made from Muscle Shoals to his home back in New Jersey following the recording of the album. This album was produced by Tolchin's friend, Marvin Etzioni, who also produced his debut album, Clover Lane. This album is inspired by a period of growth that Tolchin underwent during his experiences of heavy touring across the country. When addressing the influences behind the album, Tolchin stated, “these songs come from the joy, pain, and everything in-between that emerge from this way of life.”

=== Critical reception ===
Tom Wilk, from the Philadelphia Inquirer, said that Tolchin was "the type of artist who embodies a soul and spirit to which many aspire.”

Hal Horowitz, a writer for American Songwriter, said that the "mix of upbeat folk-rockers with moodier fare makes this such an impressive and convincing album." He also wrote that the young songwriter from New Jersey has "acquired a southern soul" as he's progressed.

According to Brian Carroll from Red Line Roots, “Jonah Tolchin is the type of artist who embodies a soul and spirit to which many aspire.”

Writer York Wilson from Popmatters said that "on Thousand Mile Night, Tolchin builds on the great promise of his critically acclaimed debut Clover Lane."

=== Track list ===
No.	Title	Writer(s)	Length
1.	"Beauty in the Ugliest of Days"	Jonah Tolchin, Marvin Etzioni, John Michael Jonas	3:04
2.	"Thousand Mile Night"	Jonah Tolchin	3:55
3.	"I Wonder"	Jonah Tolchin	2:23
4.	"Completely"	Jonah Tolchin	5:09
5.	"Paint My Love"	Tobias The Owl	3:34
6.	"Song About Home"	Jonah Tolchin	3:40
7.	"Unless You Got Faith"	Jonah Tolchin	3:23
8.	"Where The Hell Are All Of My Friends"	Jonah Tolchin	3:13
9.	"Working Man Blues #22"	Jonah Tolchin	2:53
10.	"Hard Times Killing Floor Blues"	Skip James	3:37
Total length:			34:59

=== Musicians ===
- Jonah Tolchin — Vocals, Acoustic Guitar, Lap Steel, Lead Electric
- Santa Davis — Drums, Percussion
- Dylan Cooper — Upright Bass
- Danny Roaman — Electric Guitar
- Michael Joel Bosco — Drums, Congas
- Jamie McFarlane — Bass
- Lucas Hamren — Electric Guitar, Background Vocals, Wurlitzer
- Marvin Etzioni — Wurlitzer, Electric Mandolin, Bass, Hammond B-3
- Joachim Cooder - Drums
- Sam Amidon - Fiddle, Banjo, Background Vocals

=== Production ===
- Produced by Marvin Etzioni and Jonah Tolchin
- Engineered by John Gifford III
- Assistant Engineer - Spencer Coats
- Mixed by John Gifford III, Jonah Tolchin and Marvin Etzioni
- Mastered by Bernie Grundman (Los Angeles, CA)

== Fires for the Cold ==
Fires for the Cold is the fourth studio album released by Tolchin. It was released through Yep Roc Records on September 13, 2019. The album debuted on several Billboard charts, including #49 Current Country Albums, #50 Americana/Folk Albums and #89 Top New Artists Albums (Heatseekers).

=== Background ===
The inspiration for the title of Tolchin's fourth album came from a line written by the late poet Mary Oliver in which she said, "Poetry is a life-cherishing force. For poems are not words, after all, but fires for the cold, ropes let down to the lost, something as necessary as bread in the pockets of the hungry.” Tolchin believed this sentiment reflected his musical journey and hoped that the songs on the album would provide those "fires for the cold" to those who needed them. The album serves as a reflection of the conflicts and tribulations Tolchin went through during the few years leading up to the album, and Tolchin said that this album became a "healing process" as he dealt with his emotions through that period of time. This album was recorded at Carriage House Studios (Silverlake, CA) and was also mixed there by Sheldon Gomberg. The album also features notable guests such as Jackson Browne and Rickie Lee Jones.

=== Critical reception ===
Americana focused magazine, Elmore Magazine, said "Tolchin has delivered a uniquely sounding, deeply memorable recording."

Mojo Magazine said that this album "screams of being written and played around a kitchen table in the dead of night as whiskey and wine bottles fall" and that "[Tolchin] often described as old beyond his years, on Fires for the Cold, has truly grown up."

H.R. Gertner, of Americana Highways, said that “Jonah Tolchin has that spark. The growl in his voice has an ability to shake your core. The words cut deep as he patters on with the lyrics of his songs. There is heart in his songs that can’t be faked.”

Glide Magazine said, "Tolchin really does nail the emotional power of the original tune, reminding us that he is as much a songwriter of today as he is someone who can interpret the past."

=== Track list ===
No.	Title	Writer(s)	Length
1.	"Supermarket Rage" (ft. Sara Watkins)	Jonah Tolchin	3:24
2.	"The Real You"	Jonah Tolchin	4:08
3.	"White Toyota Ranger"	Jonah Tolchin	3:44
4.	"Turn to Ashes"	Jonah Tolchin	3:59
5.	"Honeysuckle"	Jonah Tolchin	4:05
6.	"Wash Over You"	Jonah Tolchin	3:38
7.	"Roll Um Easy" (ft. Jackson Browne & Rickie Lee Jones)	Lowell George	3:24
8.	"Day by Day"	Jonah Tolchin	3:19
9.	"Timeless River"	Jonah Tolchin	4:33
10.	"Maybe I'm a Rolling Stone"	Jonah Tolchin	3:46
Total length:			38:05

=== Musicians ===
- Jonah Tolchin: Vocals, Acoustic Guitar, Electric Guitar (3, 4), Bowed Acro Wah Wah Bass (9)
- Jay Bellerose: Drums
- Fred Tackett: Electric Guitar, Mandotar (6), Mandolin (7)
- Sebastian Steinberg: Upright Bass
- Will Gramling: Keyboards
- Cindy Walker & Marie Lewey: Vocals (6)
- Sheldon Gomberg (with Bill Mims and Jonah Tolchin): Bowed Acro Wah Wah Bass (9)
- Greg Leisz: Steel Guitar (7)
- Ben Peeler: Steel Guitar (3), Weissenborn (9)
- Jackson Browne: Vocals (7)
- Rickie Lee Jones: Vocals (7)
- Sara Watkins: Violin & Vocals (1,5)
- Vanessa Freebairn-Smith: Cello (8)
- Billy Mims: Bowed Acro Wah Wah Bass (9)

=== Production ===
- Recorded & mixed by Sheldon Gomberg at Carriage House Studios (Silverlake, CA)
- Additional engineering by Billy Mims & Jason Gossman
- Cindy Walker & Marie Lewey vocals recorded by John Gifford III at FAME Studios (Muscle Shoals, AL)
- Mastered by Joe Gastwirt
- Artwork/Layout by Kelsi Kosinski
- Additional layout by Nathan Golub

== Discography ==
=== Studio albums ===
- Criminal Man (2012)
- Clover Lane (2014)
- Thousand Mile Night (2016)
- Fires For The Cold (2019)
- Lava Lamp (2022)
- Dockside (2023)

=== Extended plays ===
- Eldawise (2011)
- Beautiful World (2012)
- 5 Dollar (2013)

=== Singles ===
- "21st Century Girl" (2014)
- "The Grateful Song (Thanksgiving)" (2018)
- "Drift Away" (2019)
