= Marvin Etzioni =

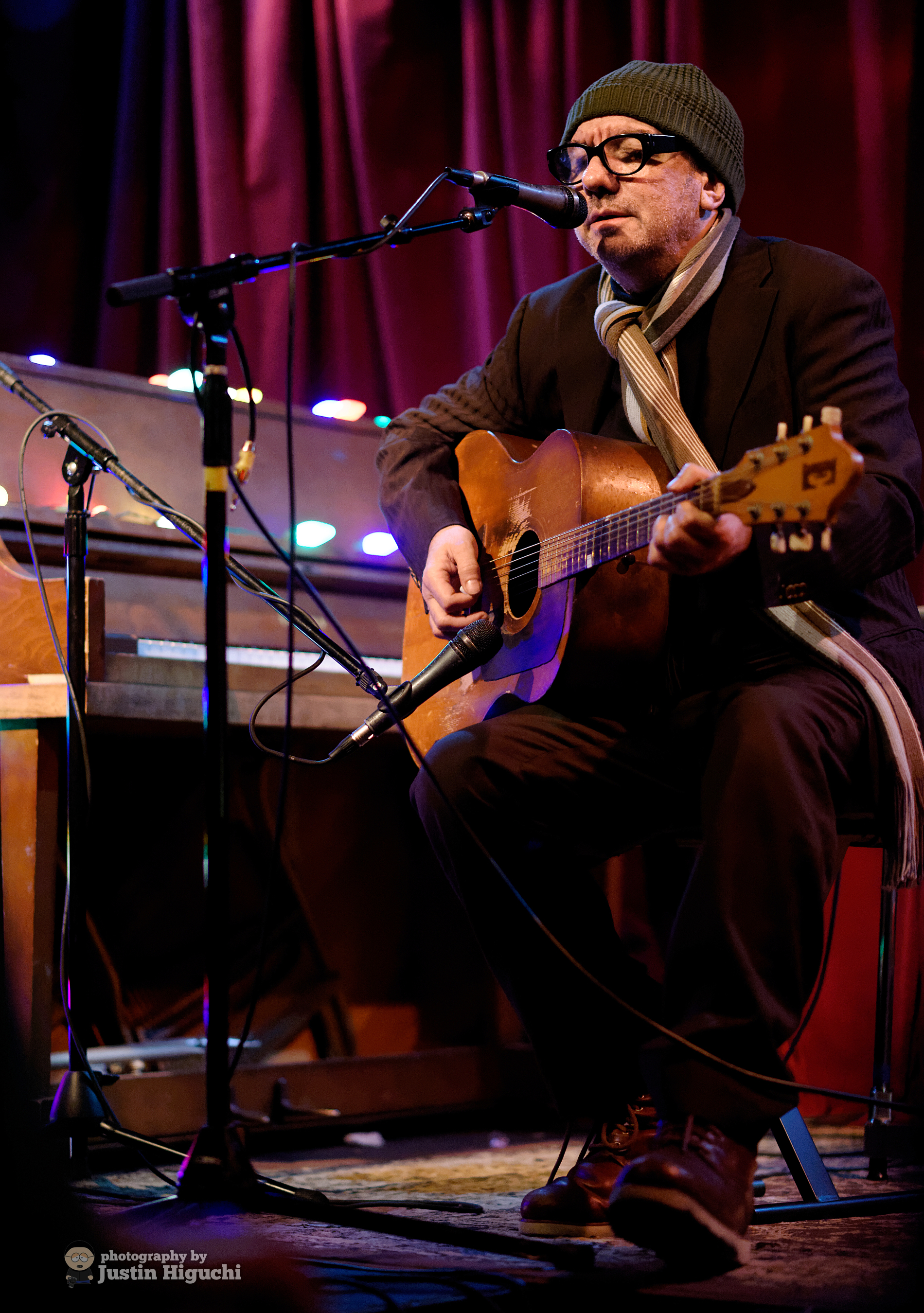

Background information
- Born: Marvin Elan Etzioni; Brooklyn, New York, U.S.
- Genres: Rock music, alt-country
- Occupation: Musician
- Instruments: Vocals, mandolin, mandocello, guitar, bass, piano, Mellotron, keyboards
- Years active: 1976–present
- Website: www.marvincountry.com

Marvin Elan Etzioni is an American singer, mandolinist, bassist, and record producer. Also known as the Mandolin Man, Etzioni is best known as a founder of, and bassist for, the band Lone Justice. He is a noted record producer and has released three solo albums.

== Biography ==
=== Early years ===
Etzioni grew up in Brooklyn, then moved to Los Angeles. His grandfather sparked an early interest in country music by compiling mix tapes, and gifting Etzioni a mandolin at age eight. In high school, Etzioni sang and played drums in the band Prudence Goodbody.

In 1976, Etzioni led the band Model, who shared stages with the Plimsouls and the Motels. Model recorded with producers Chuck Plotkin and Richard Baskin, but nothing was officially released. Then in 1980 Etzioni began performed solo acoustic gigs in Los Angeles.

=== Lone Justice ===
In 1982, Etzioni met Ryan Hedgecock, who shared his love for country and roots music. Hedgecock was already performing with Maria McKee. Hedgecock and McKee asked Etzioni to back them on bass duties, along with drummer Don Heffington and the band Lone Justice was launched.

Etzioni was a member of Lone Justice from 1983 to 1986, during which he encouraged them to write original material, and contributed the songs "East of Eden," "Working Late," "You Are the Light," and "Soap, Soup and Salvation" (written with McKee).

In 1993, Etzioni and Heffington backed McKee on her solo album You Gotta Sin to Get Saved, and were part of her band in the subsequent tour.

=== Production and songwriting ===
Etzioni has produced for numerous artists, including Peter Case, Counting Crows, and Toad the Wet Sprocket. Etzioni's compositions have been covered by Cheap Trick, Victoria Williams, Julie Miller and Judy Collins. Etzioni produced and wrote songs with the Williams Brothers (Andy Williams' nephews Andrew and David). Together with David Williams, Etzioni co-wrote "Can't Cry Hard Enough" which became his most successful song.

=== Solo recordings ===
In the 1990s, Etzioni recorded and released three albums: The Mandolin Man (1991), Bone (1992) and Weapons of the Spirit (1994). Etzioni employs the analog-vinyl-digital (AVD) technique, in which his master tapes are converted first to vinyl, and the vinyl is recorded to digital for the final product.

In 2012, Etzioni released the 2-disc album Marvin Country on Nine Mile Records. On the album, which had been in development since 1985, Etzioni played mandolin, mandocello, guitar, bass, piano, Mellotron, porchboard and keyboards. Included are duets with Lucinda Williams ("Lay It on the Table"), Steve Earle ("Ain't No Work in Mississippi"), Richard Thompson ("It Don't Cost Much"), Buddy Miller ("Living Like a Hobo"), John Doe ("The Grapes of Wrath")., Maria McKee ("You Possess Me"), and the Dixie Hummingbirds ("You Are the Light"). For most songs, the backing band was Heffington (drums), Steve Fishell (pedal steel), Gurf Morlix (bass), Tammy Rogers (fiddle), and Buddy Miller and Duane Jarvis (guitar).

=== Sin City All Stars ===
Etzioni was part of the Sin City All Stars which was a one-off band for a 2004 Gram Parsons tribute concert that was captured and released on both CD and DVD.

=== Thee Holy Brothers ===
Long-time friends Etzioni and Willie Aron (of the band Balancing Act) collaborated as Thee Holy Brothers, and released the album My Name Is Sparkle on the Peermusic label. Their band name was provided by their rabbi. Nine songs are presented in two acts, addressing the topic of spiritual grace. Thematically, the album has been likened to George Harrison's All Things Must Pass and Pete Townshend's Who Came First.

== Discography ==
=== Solo albums ===
- 1992: The Mandolin Man (Regional)
- 1992: Bone (Restless)
- 1994: Weapons of the Spirit (Restless)
- 2012: Marvin Country (Nine Mile)

=== With Lone Justice ===
- 1983: This Is Lone Justice: The Vaught Tapes 1983 (Omnivore) released in 2014
- 1985: Lone Justice (Geffen)

=== With Thee Holy Brothers ===
- 2016: My Name Is Sparkle (Peermusic)
- 2025: High In My Balloon (Regional Records)

=== With The Sin City All Stars ===
- 2004: Various artists - Return to Sin City: A Tribute to Gram Parsons CD, DVD (Image Entertainment)

=== As composer ===
- 1986: Peter Case - Peter Case (Geffen) - track 7, "Old Blue Car" (co-written with Peter Case and Victoria Williams)
- 1987: The Williams Brothers - Two Stories (Warner Bros.) - track 9, "All Pumped Up" (co-written with David and Andrew Williams)
- 1989: The Riflebirds - April - track 1, "Memory Street", and co-writing credits on three other tracks.
- 1990: Jimmy Barnes - Two Fires (Atlantic) - track 4, "Love Is Enough" (co-written with Jimmy Barnes, Chas Sandford, Brent Thomas, and Dave Froggatt)
- 1990: Victoria Williams - Swing the Statue! (Rough Trade) - track 8, "Can't Cry Hard Enough" (co-written with David Williams); track 11, "Weeds" (co-written with Andrew Williams)
- 1991: Voice of the Beehive - Honey Lingers (London) - track 7, "Little Gods"
- 1993: Maria McKee - You Gotta Sin to Get Saved (Geffen) - track 1, "I'm Gonna Soothe You"; track 9, "Why Wasn't I More Grateful (When Life Was Sweet)"; track 10: "You Gotta Sin to Get Saved" (all co-written with Bruce Brody and Maria McKee)
- 1998: Duane Jarvis - Far from Perfect (Watermelon) - track 5, "Vanishing Breed" (co-written with Duane Jarvis)
- 2001: Christine Collister - An Equal Love (Topic) - track 2, "Can't Cry Hard Enough" (co-written with David Williams)
- 2001: The Good Sons - Happiness (Floating World) - track 1, "Can't Cry Hard Enough" (co-written with David Williams)
- 2003: The Syrups - The Syrups (Beck) - track 1, "Unavailable" (co-written with Pat Walton)
- 2006: Judy Collins - Portrait of an American Girl (Wildflower) - track 3, "Can't Cry Hard Enough" (co-written with David Williams)
- 2008: Tom Freund - Collapsible Plans (Surf Road) - track 5, "Can't Cry Hard Enough" (co-written with David Williams)
- 2010: Peter Case - Wig! (Yep Roc) - track 4, "New Old Blue Car" (co-written with Peter Case and Victoria Williams)
- 2013: Lisa Loeb - No Fairy Tale (429 Records) - track 11, "Ami, I'm Sorry" (co-written with Lisa Loeb)
- 2015: Judy Collins - Strangers Again (Wildflower) - track 1, "Strangers Again" (co-written with Ari Hest)
- 2016: Judy Collins and Ari Hest - Silver Skies Blue (Cleopatra Records) - track 12, "Strangers Again" (co-written with Ari Hest)

=== As producer ===
- 1987: The Satellites Four - Earthless (Wrestler)
- 1988: Voice of the Beehive - Let It Bee (London)
- 1989: The Riflebirds - April
- 1990: Toad the Wet Sprocket - Pale (Columbia)
- 1993: The Williams Brothers - Harmony Hotel (Warner Bros.)
- 1994: Peter Case - Sings Like Hell (Vanguard)
- 1995: Larry John McNally - Vibrolux (Pioneer)
- 1998: Mike Ireland and Holler - Learning How to Live (Sire)
- 2002: Grey DeLisle - Homewrecker (Humminbird Records)
- 2004: David Andrews - Everything to Lose (EastSound)
- 2004: Grey DeLisle - The Graceful Ghost (Sugar Hill)
- 2006: Grey DeLisle - Iron Flowers (Sugar Hill)
- 2007: Adam Levy - Washing Day (Lost Wax)
- 2008: Ralston Bowles - Rally at the Texas Hotel (WildFlower)
- 2014: Jonah Tolchin - Clover Lane (Yep Roc)
- 2016: Jonah Tolchin - Thousand Mile Night (Yep Roc)

=== Other appearances ===
- 1987: Tim Scott - The High Lonesome Sound (Geffen)
- 1994: Sam Phillips - Martinis & Bikinis (Omnivore)
- 1995: Dog's Eye View - Happy Nowhere (Columbia)
- 1995: Moris Tepper - Big Enough to Disappear (Candlebone)
- 1996: Tammy Rogers - Tammy Rogers (Dead Reckoning)
- 2003: Adam Rogers - Allegory (Criss Cross Jazz)
- 2006: Dixie Chicks - Taking the Long Way (Open Wide / Columbia)
- 2006: Alexi Murdoch - Time Without Consequence (Zero Summer)
- 2008: Ted Russell Kamp - Poor Man's Paradise (Dualtone)
- 2014: Lili Haydn - LiliLand (MRI)
