= Lone Justice =

American country rock band

- Origin: Los Angeles, California, U.S.
- Genres: Country rock; roots rock; cowpunk; rockabilly
- Years active: 1982–1987, 2024
- Label: Geffen
- Past members: Maria McKee; Ryan Hedgecock; Marvin Etzioni; David Harrington; Don Willens; Don Heffington; Tony Gilkyson; Shane Fontayne; Bruce Brody; Gregg Sutton; Rudy Richman

Lone Justice was an American country rock band formed in 1982 by guitarist Ryan Hedgecock and singer Maria McKee in Los Angeles. The band released two albums, Lone Justice in 1985 and Shelter the following year, before disbanding in 1987.

== History ==
=== Early era ===
Lone Justice began as part of the L.A. cowpunk scene of the 1980s, inspired by Hedgecock and McKee's shared affection for rockabilly and country music. The group started out as a strict cover band, but after the additions of bassist David Harrington and drummer Don Willens, they began to compose their own material. Marvin Etzioni was initially brought in as producer, arranger and songwriter for the band, but ended up replacing Harrington as bassist in 1983. By 1984, Don Heffington had replaced Willens as drummer. Their early sound was a fusion of country music and punk rock with rockabilly elements, but by the time of their first album, the band had begun to incorporate elements of roots rock and singer-songwriter styles. Benmont Tench of Tom Petty and the Heartbreakers was a frequent guest musician at their live shows. The band earned early support from Dolly Parton, who attended one of their club shows and later recalled McKee as "The greatest girl singer any band could ever have."

Lone Justice developed their initial following within the Los Angeles music scene. Local rock journalist Stann Findelle reported in Performance magazine that the band "stole the show" at the Whisky a Go Go from headliner Arthur Lee, who was attempting a comeback that night, but left after two songs. Linda Ronstadt was introduced to the band by wardrobe stylist Genny Schorr. Linda Ronstadt made a call to David Geffen and they were signed to Geffen Records amid a flurry of publicity.

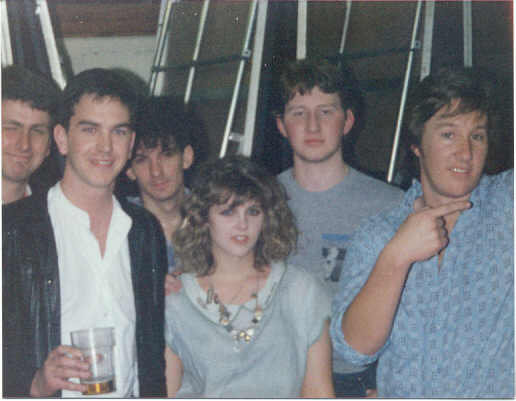
Lone Justice in 1985

Their self-titled debut appeared in 1985, followed by a tour in support of U2. For touring, the band augmented their line-up with guitarist Tony Gilkyson, who left the band in 1986. Produced by Jimmy Iovine, the album received some significant critical reviews, including that of Jimmy Guterman, then a critic at Rolling Stone, who placed it in his list of the best albums ever made. The Village Voice's Pazz & Jop Critics Poll for 1985 ranked it No. 24. Nonetheless, the album failed to connect with country or rock audiences, and the whole enterprise suffered from excessive pre-release promotion that "raised expectations... [the album] couldn't possibly satisfy". Two singles fizzled – "Sweet, Sweet Baby (I'm Falling)" and "Ways To Be Wicked", the latter written by Tom Petty and Mike Campbell – and the album did not meet commercial expectations.

=== Later era ===
In the record's wake, Etzioni and Heffington went their separate ways, and McKee and Hedgecock assembled an all-new band. After enlisting guitarist Shane Fontayne, bassist Gregg Sutton, drummer Rudy Richman, and keyboardist Bruce Brody (formerly of the Patti Smith Group), Lone Justice recorded their second LP, Shelter. Steve Van Zandt was the producer, along with Jimmy Iovine and the band. This record saw them almost completely abandoning much of their earlier cowpunk, rockabilly, and roots rock influences in favor of what could be considered more typical 1980s pop/rock production, with heavy emphasis on drum machines and synthesizers. Commercially, the album charted lower than its predecessor, reaching only No. 65 on the album charts. However, the title single did better than the band's previous two singles, reaching No. 26 on the Rock Singles chart, and No. 47 on Billboard Hot 100 chart.

=== Disbandment ===
Less than a year after Shelter's release, McKee broke up the band for good in 1987 and went on to a solo career. Heffington became a session drummer, while Etzioni recorded under the name "the Mandolin Man". Rudy Richman played drums with UK rock band The Quireboys between 1992 and 1993, appearing on the album Bitter Sweet & Twisted. Fontayne played guitar in Bruce Springsteen's band for the tour backing up the Lucky Town/Human Touch albums. After a decade removed from the music industry, Hedgecock returned in 1996 as half of the duo Parlor James.

A Lone Justice retrospective, This World Is Not My Home, was released in January 1999, featuring early demo recordings. A budget compilation was issued in 2003 as part of Universal Music's 20th Century Masters series. Their 1985 performance of "Sweet, Sweet Baby (I'm Falling)" was released by BBC Video on The Old Grey Whistle Test Vol. 3 compilation DVD, 2004. Between 2014 and 2019, Omnivore Recordings issued three retrospective releases consisting of demo and live recordings made in 1983: This Is Lone Justice: The Vaught Tapes, 1983 (2014), The Western Tapes, 1983 (2018), and Live at the Palomino, 1983 (2019).

In March 2021, Heffington died of leukemia at age 70. Sutton died on October 22, 2023, at the age of 74.

== Discography ==
=== Albums ===
Year	Album	Chart Positions					Label
Year	Album	US Country	US	AUS	UK	CAN	Label
1985	Lone Justice	62	56	—	49	—	Geffen
1986	Shelter	—	65	66	84	86	Geffen
2024	Viva Lone Justice						

=== Live albums ===
Year	Album	Chart Positions			Label
Year	Album	US Country	US	UK	Label
1994	BBC Radio 1 Live in Concert	—	—	—	Windsong
2019	Live at the Palomino, 1983	—	—	—	Omnivore

=== Compilation albums ===
Year	Album	Chart Positions			Label
Year	Album	US Country	US	UK	Label
1999	This World Is Not My Home	—	—	—	Geffen
2003	The Best of Lone Justice	—	—	—	Geffen, Chronicles
2014	This Is Lone Justice: The Vaught Tapes, 1983	—	—	—	Omnivore

=== EPs ===
- I Found Love — 1987 Limited Edition UK double 45RPM EP in gatefold cover on Geffen GEF18F – Includes the songs: "I Found Love" (studio), "If You Don't Like Rain" (studio), "Sweet Jane" (Live BBC Transcription Services recording) and "Don't Toss Us Away" (Live BBC Transcription Services recording).
- The Western Tapes, 1983 (2018)

=== Singles ===
Year	Single	Chart Positions				Album
Year	Single	USR	US	AUS	UK	Album
1985	"Sweet, Sweet Baby (I'm Falling)"	—	73	—	—	Lone Justice
1985	"Ways to Be Wicked"	29	71	—	77	Lone Justice
1986	"Shelter"	26	47	38	108	Shelter
1987	"I Found Love"	—	—	—	45	Shelter
