= Don't Call Me Baby (Voice of the Beehive song) =

1988 single by Voice of the Beehive

Single by Voice of the Beehive

from the album Let It Bee
- B-side: "There's a Barbarian in the Back of My Car"
- Released: May 2, 1988
- Studio: Puk (Gjerlev, Denmark)
- Length: 3:05
- Label: London
- Composer: Mike Jones
- Lyricist: Tracey Bryn
- Producer: Pete Collins

Voice of the Beehive singles chronology
"I Walk the Earth" (1988)	"Don't Call Me Baby" (1988)	"I Say Nothing" (1988)

Music video
- "Don't Call Me Baby" on YouTube

"Don't Call Me Baby" is a song by the English-American alternative pop rock band Voice of the Beehive. The song was written by lead singer Tracey Bryn with guitarist and keyboardist Mike Jones and was released as the fourth single from the band's debut album, Let It Bee (1988), on May 2, 1988. Backed with "Jump This Way" outside the US, it became a hit, peaking at No. 15 in the United Kingdom, No. 48 in Australia, and No. 25 in New Zealand. The song was included on the band's compilation albums A Portrait and The Best of Voice of the Beehive.

== Background ==
In a 2022 interview with British newspaper The Guardian, Voice of the Beehive member Tracey Bryn explained that she was living with her boyfriend in London, England, when she came up with the song. Her boyfriend attempted to start a recording career of his own by playing a cassette tape of his music for Food Records. However, the record company accidentally played the wrong side of the cassette, on which Bryn had recorded one of her tracks. They ultimately decided to work with Bryn instead of her boyfriend, which quickly led to them splitting up.

Bryn soon decided to write a song that sounded like a teenage anthem. She explained:

I had heard Robert Smith from the Cure saying one of their songs was a crack at a teenage anthem. I wanted to try that too, but didn't want us to sing: "Baby, why don't you love me?" I always hated it when guys called me "baby". I remembered a movie where Ann-Margret says "Don't call me baby" to Elvis Presley. I had liked the line so much I'd written it down in my journal, so when I was looking for ideas, I thought: "Ah-ha!"

In the same interview, Bryn's bandmate Melissa Belland stated that when she found out Bryn had moved to London, she immediately followed her. Once they joined Food Records, the label hired the duo's rhythm section by asking two former members from English ska band Madness—Dan "Woody" Woodgate and Mark "Bedders" Bedford—to assist them. However, Bedders soon left, with Martin Brett replacing him on bass guitar. According to Belland, "...he challenged Woody musically and they sort of made each other even better". The group recorded the track at Puk Studios in Gjerlev, Denmark.

== Lyrical content ==
Bryn co-wrote "Don't Call Me Baby" with Mike Jones, who composed the music while Bryn wrote the lyrics. As she did, she thought back to one of her ex-boyfriends in the United States who used to call her "baby" and was unfaithful to her. The ex-boyfriend claimed that he had been borrowing Bryn's car to run errands, but in reality, he was taking another girl out on dates. One of the song's lyrics, "meeting at midnight while avoiding all the neighbours", refers to how the ex-boyfriend would hide both of his girlfriends from the neighbors so they would not notice his infidelity. Belland sings the first verse, but Food Records initially did not want her to.

== Track listings ==
US 7-inch single

A. "Don't Call Me Baby" – 3:05
B. "There's a Barbarian in the Back of My Car" – 2:48

International 7-inch single

A. "Don't Call Me Baby"
B. "Jump This Way"

UK and Australasian 12-inch single

A1. "Don't Call Me Baby"
B1. "Jump This Way"
B2. "Goodbye Tonight"

UK and European CD single

1. "Don't Call Me Baby"
2. "Jump This Way"
3. "I Say Nothing"
4. "Goodbye Tonight"

UK and European CD Video single

1. "Don't Call Me Baby"
2. "Man in the Moon"
3. "Sorrow Floats"
4. "Don't Call Me Baby" (video)

== Personnel ==
Personnel are taken from the UK CD single liner and disc notes.

- Tracey Bryn – words
- Mike Jones – music
- Pete Collins – production
- Nigel Green – mixing
- Vivid I.D. – art direction and design
- Mike Owen – photography

== Charts ==
Chart (1988)	Peak position
Australia (ARIA)	48
Europe (Eurochart Hot 100)	50
Ireland (IRMA)	15
Israel (Israeli Singles Chart)	6
Luxembourg (Radio Luxembourg)	9
New Zealand (Recorded Music NZ)	25
UK Singles (Official Charts)	15
