= Shelter (Lone Justice album) =

Studio album by Lone Justice
- Released: November 3, 1986
- Studios: A&M, Hollywood; Atlantic, New York City; Village Recorder, Los Angeles
- Genre: Country rock
- Length: 44:03
- Label: Geffen
- Producers: Little Steven, Jimmy Iovine, Lone Justice

Lone Justice chronology
Lone Justice (1985)	Shelter (1986)	BBC Radio 1 Live in Concert (1994)

Shelter is the second album by American country rock band Lone Justice, released on November 3, 1986.

== Critical reception ==
Professional ratings
Review scores
Source	Rating
AllMusic	3/5 stars
New Musical Express	5/10
Record Mirror	3.5/5 stars
The Rolling Stone Album Guide	2.5/5 stars

Jon Pareles, music critic for The New York Times, gave high praise to McKee's singing and the band's musicianship, but described the album as something of a disappointment in that "the band's songwriting has grown weaker": whereas the songs of the debut album were filled with "down-to-earth details that make country music hit home", those of Shelter "are much vaguer – they're about abstracted emotions rather than recognizable people".

== Track listing ==
Writing credits adapted from the album's liner notes.

No.	Title	Lyrics	Music	Length
1.	"I Found Love"	Maria McKee	Steven Van Zandt, McKee	4:15
2.	"Shelter"	McKee, Van Zandt	Van Zandt, McKee	4:37
3.	"Reflected (On My Side)"	McKee	Shane Fontayne, McKee	4:57
4.	"Beacon"	McKee	Fontayne, McKee	4:18
5.	"Wheels"	McKee	McKee	5:05
6.	"Belfry"	McKee	Fontayne, Van Zandt, McKee	5:03
7.	"Dreams Come True (Stand Up & Take It)"	McKee, Gregg Sutton	Sutton	4:06
8.	"The Gift"	McKee	McKee	4:16
9.	"Inspiration"	McKee	Sutton	3:49
10.	"Dixie Storms"	McKee	McKee	3:37

== Charts ==
Year	Chart	Position
1987	Billboard 200	65
1987	Australia (Kent Music Report)	66
1986	Canada	86

== Personnel ==
Adapted from the album's liner notes.

Lone Justice

- Maria McKee – vocals, guitar, piano
- Ryan Hedgecock – guitar
- Shane Fontayne – guitar
- Gregg Sutton – bass guitar, vocals
- Bruce Brody – keyboards
- Rudy Richman – drums

Additional personnel

- Tommy Mandel – keyboards
- Benmont Tench – keyboards
- Charles Judge – keyboards
- Little Steven – acoustic guitar, rhythm guitar
- Vesta Williams – background vocals [1]
- Portia Griffin – background vocals [1]
- Alexandra Brown – background vocals [1]
- Audrey Wheeler – background vocals [4]
- Brenda White-King – background vocals [4]
- Kevin Dorsey – background vocals [5]
- Debra Dobkin – percussion [7]

Production

- Little Steven – producer
- Jimmy Iovine – producer
- Lone Justice – producer
- Joe Chiccarelli – associate producer, engineer, mixing
- Robert de la Garza – engineer
- Don Smith – engineer
- Steven Rinkoff – engineer
- Niko Bolas – engineer
- Bruce Lampcov – engineer
- Joe Borja – engineer
- Scott Litt – engineer
- Greg Edward – engineer, mixing
- Shelly Yakus – engineer, mixing
- Rob Jacobs – assistant engineer
- Michael Bowman – assistant engineer
- Marc DeSisto – assistant engineer
- Craig Engel – assistant engineer
- Ross Stein – assistant engineer
- Mike Shipley – mixing
- Humberto Gatica – mixing
- Stephen Marcussen – mastering
- Janet Weber – production coordination
- Paula Pavlik – production assistant
- Cooper Edens – cover art
- Melanie Nissen – photography
- Kim Champagne – design
