= Grey DeLisle =

American voice actress (born 1973)

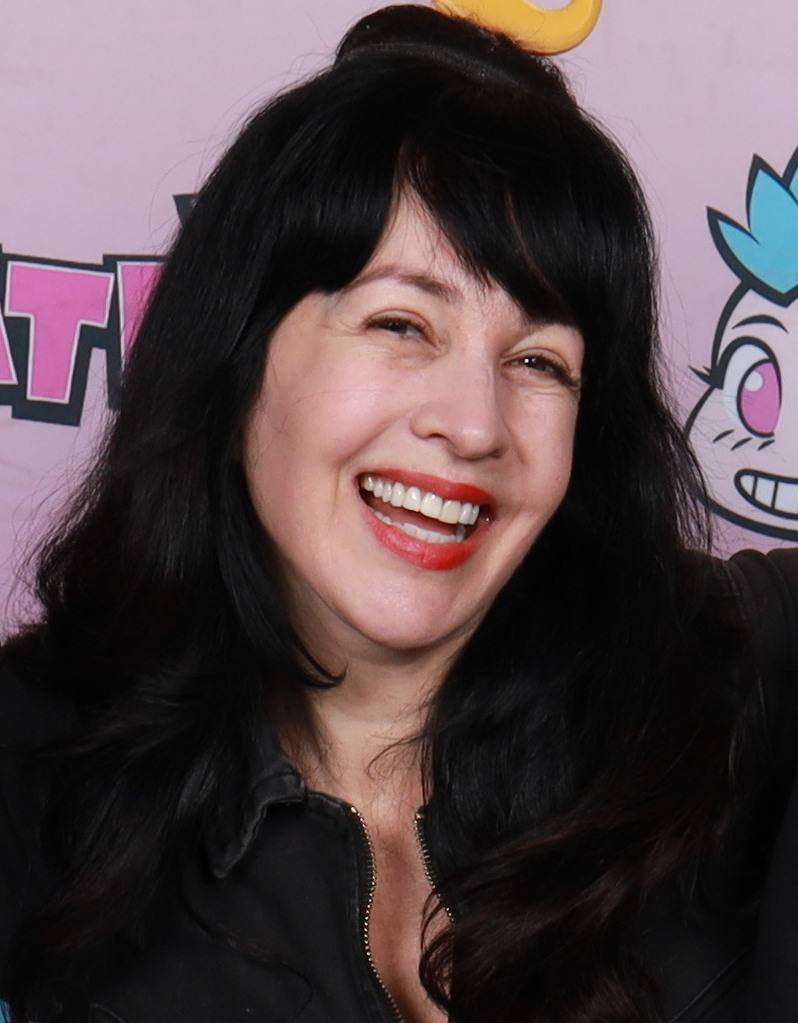
- DeLisle in 2025
- Born: Erin Grey Van Oosbree; August 24, 1973 (age 53); Fort Ord, California, U.S.
- Other names: Grey DeLisle-Griffin; Grey Griffin
- Occupations: Voice actress; comedian; singer-songwriter
- Years active: 1983–present
- Spouses: Christopher DeLisle (m. 1992; div. 1993); Murry Hammond (m. 2002; div. 2010); Jared Griffin (m. 2012; div. 2017)
- Children: 3
- Musical career
- Genres: Country; electronic
- Instruments: Vocals; autoharp
- Labels: Hummin'bird; Sugar Hill
- Website: greydelislegriffin.com

Grey DeLisle (/dəˈlaɪl/; born Erin Grey Van Oosbree; August 24, 1973), sometimes credited as Grey DeLisle-Griffin or Grey Griffin, is an American voice actress, comedian, and singer-songwriter. Her voice roles include Daphne Blake in the Scooby-Doo franchise since 2000, Emily Elizabeth Howard in Clifford the Big Red Dog, Lorraine "Lor" MacQuarrie in The Weekenders, Vicky and her sister Tootie in The Fairly OddParents, Miranda in W.I.T.C.H., Kimiko Tohomiko in Xiaolin Showdown, Mandy in The Grim Adventures of Billy & Mandy, Frances "Frankie" Foster in Foster's Home for Imaginary Friends, Sam Manson on Danny Phantom, Shrinking Rae and Monster Girl in Invincible, Ming Hua in The Legend of Korra, and Azula in Avatar: The Last Airbender. In anime, she provided the English dub voice of Tomoe in Afro Samurai: Resurrection, Setsu Oiwa in When Marnie Was There and Taeko's Mother in Only Yesterday.

On September 27, 2018, she released her debut comedy act, titled My First Comedy Special. On November 10, 2019, The Simpsons producers announced that DeLisle would replace Russi Taylor as the voice of Martin Prince and Sherri and Terri, after Taylor's death in July 2019. DeLisle was one of the winners of the Grammy Award for Best Traditional Folk Album for being one of the contributing musical artists for the compilation album Beautiful Dreamer in 2005. In 2022, she was nominated for the Children's and Family Emmy Award for Outstanding Voice Performance in an Animated Program for her work on The Loud House.

== Early life ==
DeLisle was born Erin Grey Van Oosbree on August 24, 1973, in Fort Ord, California, to truck driver George Van Oosbree and singer Joanna Ruth, and grew up in a Mexican-American household. She has described herself as "a 75% white woman raised by my Mexican grandma". Her parents separated when she was young. She has two brothers. DeLisle's mother became a born-again Pentecostal when she was eleven and she was later raised by her maternal grandmother, Eva Flores, a vocalist who performed with salsa musician Tito Puente. DeLisle has named her father's love of country music as the biggest influence on her musical taste. She attended Chula Vista High School in the same graduating class as Mario Lopez. In her late teens, she started singing old gospel tunes, and entered the world of comedy on the advice of a friend. In her comedy routine, DeLisle imitated voices. Her impressions earned the attention of a casting director and she was advised to take up voice acting. At this time, she went back to her musical ambitions but also took classes in voice-overs. She soon began working with talent agent Sandy Schnarr.

== Career ==
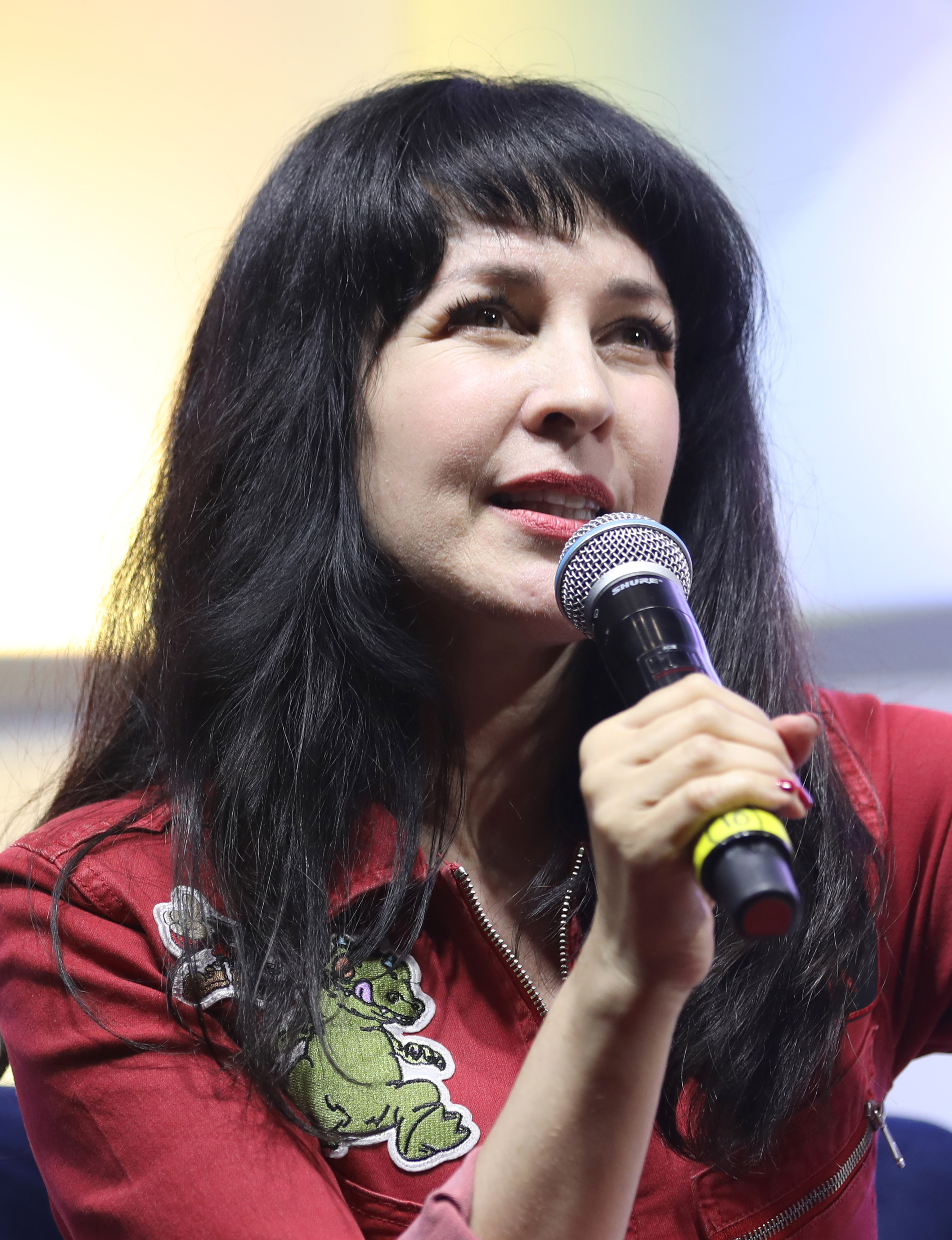
DeLisle in 2024

As of October 2024, DeLisle has voiced over 2,058 roles in 533 titles, as well as dozens of bit parts in 45 titles in which she is credited with "additional voices".

In the Scooby-Doo franchise, DeLisle began voicing Daphne Blake with the direct-to-video film Scooby-Doo and the Cyber Chase, inheriting the role from her friend and teacher Mary Kay Bergman following the latter's suicide. She later said of Bergman, "It was an interesting turn of events to get to play Daphne, but I'm so glad that I have the role, and I was glad that I was able to carry that on for her. She set the bar very high." DeLisle also credited the work for helping her maintain her music career, stating "I think Daphne just saved country music." In 2019, Warner Bros. announced that Amanda Seyfried would be voicing Daphne in the animated film Scoob! instead of DeLisle. Both DeLisle and Matthew Lillard, the current voice of Shaggy Rogers were upset about not being contacted about the decision to recast for their roles for the film. Around the time of the film's release, DeLisle said that she did not bear any hard feelings towards Seyfried or her performance in it.

== Personal life ==
Her first marriage was to Christopher DeLisle in 1992. The two later divorced in 1993 after she accidentally confessed to cheating on him. In 2002, she married Murry Hammond of the alt-country band Old 97's; their courtship and wedding were featured in an episode of A Wedding Story. She gave birth to their son Jefferson Texas "Tex" Hammond in 2007. They divorced in 2010. She later met Jared Griffin through Twitter, and the two married on June 27, 2012. The couple's son Harlan was born in 2014, and a daughter named Mariposa followed in 2016. Their marriage ended the following year. DeLisle has ADHD.

== Discography ==
=== Albums ===
- The Small Time (2000)
- Homewrecker (2002)
- Bootlegger, Vol. 1 (2003)
- The Graceful Ghost (2004)
- Iron Flowers (2005)
- Anchored in Love: A Tribute to June Carter Cash (2007)
- She's an Angel (2023)
- The Grey Album (2025)
- Grey & Greene (with Les Greene) (2026)

=== Singles ===
- 2006 – "Willie We Have Missed You", song on Beautiful Dreamer: The Songs of Stephen Foster (2006)
- 2024 — "I Don't Want Nothing" (with Les Greene), non-album single (2024)
