= Voice of the Beehive =

Anglo-American pop band

- Origin: London, United Kingdom
- Genres: Alternative; pop rock
- Years active: 1986–1996 (reunions: 2003, 2017)
- Labels: Food; London; East West; Discovery
- Past members: Tracey Bryn; Melissa Brooke Belland; Mike Jones; Mark Bedford; Daniel Woodgate; Martin Brett; Brad Nack; Tom Fenner
- Website: voiceofthebeehive.com

Voice of the Beehive were an Anglo-American alternative pop rock band formed in London in 1986.

The group featured Californian lead vocalist sisters Tracey Bryn and Melissa Brooke Belland (daughters of The Four Preps singer Bruce Belland). They teamed with British musicians Mike Jones, Martin Brett, and Daniel Woodgate and Mark Bedford – former members of Madness. The band took their name from the Greek meaning of the name Melissa, meaning honey bee.

== Career ==
The band had five Top 40 singles from two albums in the UK. Their biggest commercial success came with the singles "I Say Nothing", "Don't Call Me Baby", "Monsters and Angels" and "I Think I Love You", taken from albums Let It Bee and Honey Lingers. Sex & Misery, a third album, was released in 1996; ; however, by this point Tracey and Melissa were the sole group members. In an interview with the LA Times, it was reported that Woody Woodgate returned to his former band, Madness; Martin Brett moved into commercials, and that Mike Jones left because he didn't agree with the band's new creative direction for Sex & Misery. The band reformed in 2003 to play a two-week UK tour.

In October 2017, Bryn and Belland reformed with the original line-up to play a pair of concert dates in London, including the '80s/'90s revival show Indie Daze 4.

== Band members ==
- Tracey Bryn – guitar and vocals – (born 17 May 1962, Encino, California)
- Melissa Brooke Belland or "Missy Beehive" – vocals – (born 17 February 1966, Los Angeles, California)
- Martin Brett (Brett Martini) – bass guitar
- Mike Jones – guitar
- Daniel "Woody" Woodgate – drums
- Mark "Bedders" Bedford - bass guitar (1986-1987)

== Discography ==
=== Albums ===
==== Studio albums ====
| Title | Album details | Peak chart positions | | | |
| Title | Album details | UK | AUS | NZ | SCO |
|---|---|---|---|---|---|
| Let It Bee | Released: 20 June 1988; Label: London; Formats: CD, LP, Cassette tape | 13 | 53 | 40 | 52 |
| Honey Lingers | Released: 12 August 1991; Label: London; Formats: CD, LP, MC | 17 | 68 | — | 26 |
| Sex & Misery | Released: 12 February 1996; Label: East West, Discovery; Formats: CD, MC | — | — | — | — |
"—" denotes releases that did not chart or were not released in that territory.

==== Live albums ====
| Title | Album details |
|---|---|
| Don't Call Me Baby | Released: July 2008; Label: Secret; Formats: CD |
| Access All Areas | Released: 25 September 2015; Label: Edsel; Formats: CD+DVD, digital download |

==== Compilation albums ====
| Title | Album details |
|---|---|
| A Portrait | Released: 1991; Label: London; Formats: CD; Canada-only release |
| The Best of Voice of the Beehive | Released: 1997; Label: London; Formats: CD |
| Bee-Sides | Released: 2003; Label: Self-released; Formats: CD; Limited release only available through the band's website |

==== Video albums ====
| Title | Album details |
|---|---|
| Don't Call Me Baby – Live | Released: 2004; Label: Secret Films; Formats: DVD |

=== EPs ===
| Title | EP details |
|---|---|
| The Radio 1 Sessions – The Evening Show | Released: January 1989; Label: Strange Fruit/Nighttracks; Formats: 12", CD |

=== Singles ===
| Title | Year | Peak chart positions | | | | | | | | Album |
| Title | Year | UK | UK Indie | AUS | CAN | IRE | NZ | US | US Alt | Album |
|---|---|---|---|---|---|---|---|---|---|---|
| "Just a City" | 1987 | 154 | 20 | — | — | — | — | — | — | Let It Bee |
| "I Say Nothing" | 1987 | 45 | — | 73 | — | — | — | — | — | Let It Bee |
| "I Walk the Earth" | 1988 | 42 | — | — | — | — | — | — | — | Let It Bee |
| "Don't Call Me Baby" | 1988 | 15 | — | 48 | — | 15 | 25 | — | — | Let It Bee |
| "I Say Nothing" (reissue) | 1988 | 22 | — | — | — | — | — | — | 11 | Let It Bee |
| "I Walk the Earth" (reissue) | 1988 | 46 | — | — | — | — | — | — | — | Let It Bee |
| "Man in the Moon" | 1988 | 93 | — | — | — | — | — | — | — | Let It Bee |
| "Monsters and Angels" | 1991 | 17 | — | 72 | — | — | — | 74 | 8 | Honey Lingers |
| "I Think I Love You" | 1991 | 25 | — | 12 | — | — | — | — | — | Honey Lingers |
| "Perfect Place" | 1991 | 37 | — | 31 | — | — | — | — | — | Honey Lingers |
| "Angel Come Down" | 1995 | 86 | — | — | — | — | — | — | — | Sex & Misery |
| "Scary Kisses" | 1996 | — | — | — | 35 | — | — | 77 | — | Sex & Misery |
| "Heavenly" | 1996 | — | — | — | — | — | — | — | — | Sex & Misery |
| "So Hard" | 1996 | — | — | — | 66 | — | — | — | — | Sex & Misery |
"—" denotes releases that did not chart or were not released in that territory.

=== Other appearances ===
- Voice of the Beehive provided harmonies on Bill Drummond's album The Man (1986).
- An early version of "Beat of Love" was featured on the London Records compilation Giant (1987).
- Melissa and Tracey contributed a cover of "Five Feet High and Rising" to the Johnny Cash tribute album Til Things Are Brighter (1988), credited as Tracey & Melissa Beehive.
- In 1993, Voice of the Beehive contributed a cover version of "Gimme Shelter" with Jimmy Somerville to an EP released to raise funds for the Putting Our House in Order homeless initiative. The single, which contained different duet versions of the song on each format, peaked at No. 23 in the UK, and No. 214 in Australia.
