= Daisy (Dog's Eye View album) =

Studio album by Dog's Eye View
- Released: August 19, 1997
- Length: 52:02
- Label: Columbia Records
- Producer: Thom Russo; Matt Wallace

Dog's Eye View chronology
Happy Nowhere (1995)	Daisy (1997)	Tomorrow Always Comes (2006)

Professional ratings
Review scores
Source	Rating
Allmusic	3.0/5 stars

Daisy is the second studio album from the American rock band, Dog's Eye View. The follow-up to the band's 1995 debut album, Happy Nowhere, Daisy was released on August 19, 1997.

== Production ==
Dog's Eye View's singer and songwriter, Peter Stuart, publicly stated that work for Daisy was more difficult for him than for 1995's Happy Nowhere. In 2000, Stuart told MTV News, "The band worked for the first record, but on the second record [Daisy], it just felt like I was carrying this albatross." He also criticized their record label, Columbia Records, for a lack of support with Dog's Eye View's sophomore effort.

Stuart announced a break from Dog's Eye View after Daisy's release to pursue a solo album. Dog's Eye View did not reunite again until production began for their third album, Tomorrow Always Comes, released in 2006.

== Track listing ==
All tracks written and composed by Peter Stuart.

1. "The Trouble With Love" – 4:04
2. "Homecoming Parade" – 4:22
3. "What Do You Do?" – 3:16
4. "Last Letter Home" – 4:10
5. "Falling in Place" – 4:30
6. "Let It Lie" – 3:50
7. "Goodbye to Grace" – 3:48
8. "Vows" – 4:14
9. "Hollywood" – 4:49
10. "Did You Get Hurt" – 5:14
11. "The Shallows" – 3:40
12. "Umbrella" – 3:33
