= Lone Justice (album) =

Studio album by Lone Justice
- Released: April 15, 1985
- Studio: Power Station, New York City; Sunset Sound, Los Angeles; Village Recorder, Los Angeles; Rumbo, Los Angeles; Amigo, Los Angeles; Studio 55, Los Angeles
- Genre: Country rock
- Length: 35:48
- Label: Geffen
- Producer: Jimmy Iovine

Lone Justice chronology
| Lone Justice (1985) | Shelter (1986) |

Singles from Lone Justice
- 1. "Sweet, Sweet Baby (I'm Falling)" Released: 1985; 2. "Ways to Be Wicked" Released: 1985

Lone Justice is the debut studio album by American roots rock band Lone Justice, released in April 1985.

== Reception ==
Professional ratings
Review scores
| Source | Rating |
|---|---|
| AllMusic | 4/5 stars |
| MusicHound Rock | 4/5 stars |
| NME | 7/10 |
| The Rolling Stone Album Guide | 3/5 stars |
| Martin C. Strong | 7/10 |
| The Village Voice | B |

The album received some critical acclaim, but it failed commercially. Trouser Press described the problem as over-promotion: "It isn't that Lone Justice's first album is bad (it's not), but the ballyhoo that preceded the LA quartet's debut raised expectations that these frisky countryfied rock tunes (Linda Ronstadt on speed, perhaps, or Dolly Parton backed by the Blasters) couldn't possibly satisfy. Maria McKee is an impressive young singer — an energetic, throaty powerhouse with a Southern twang and a slight Patsy Cline catch — and the band is solid enough, but... [the album] doesn't come anywhere near extraordinary."

Lone Justice was ranked the 24th best album of 1985 in The Village Voice year-end Pazz & Jop critics poll.

== Track listing ==
Writing credits adapted from the album's liner notes.

| No. | Title | Lyrics | Music | Length |
|---|---|---|---|---|
| 1. | "East of Eden" | Marvin Etzioni | Etzioni | 2:37 |
| 2. | "After the Flood" | Maria McKee | McKee | 3:40 |
| 3. | "Ways to Be Wicked" | Tom Petty, Mike Campbell | Petty, Campbell | 3:28 |
| 4. | "Don't Toss Us Away" | Bryan MacLean | MacLean | 4:19 |
| 5. | "Working Late" | Etzioni | Etzioni | 2:45 |
| 6. | "Sweet, Sweet Baby (I'm Falling)" | McKee | McKee, Benmont Tench, Steven Van Zandt | 4:12 |
| 7. | "Pass It On" | McKee | McKee | 3:40 |
| 8. | "Wait 'Til We Get Home" | McKee | Ryan Hedgecock, McKee | 3:18 |
| 9. | "Soap, Soup and Salvation" | McKee | McKee | 4:04 |
| 10. | "You Are the Light" | Etzioni | Etzioni | 3:59 |

== Charts ==
| Chart (1985) | Peak position |
|---|---|
| US Billboard 200 | 56 |
| US Top Country Albums (Billboard) | 62 |

== Personnel ==
Adapted from the album's liner notes.

Lone Justice

- Maria McKee – vocals, guitar, harmonica
- Marvin Etzioni – bass guitar, background vocals
- Ryan Hedgecock – guitar, acoustic guitar [1, 7], background vocals
- Don Heffington – drums

Additional personnel

- Benmont Tench – piano, organ, background vocals [1, 8]
- Bobbye Hall – percussion overdubs
- Mike Campbell – guitar [3]
- Bob Glaub – bass guitar [3]
- Little Steven – rhythm and lead guitar [6]
- Tony Gilkyson – guitar [7]
- Annie Lennox – background vocals [6]

Production

- Jimmy Iovine – producer
- Shelly Yakus – engineer, mixing, overdub engineer
- Joe Chiccarelli – engineer, overdub engineer
- Greg Edward – engineer, mixing, overdub engineer
- Thom Panunzio – engineer, overdub engineer
- Gabe Veltri – overdub engineer
- Bruce Lampcov – assistant engineer
- Steve Shelton – assistant engineer
- Steve Hirsch – assistant engineer
- Greg Droman – assistant engineer
- Steve Strassman – assistant engineer
- Bill Jackson – assistant engineer
- Don Smith – mixing, overdub engineer
- Dave Thoener – mixing
- Stephen Marcussen – mastering
- Janet Weber – production coordination
- Deborah Turbeville – photography
- Paula Greif – art direction
- Jeffrey Kent Ayeroff – art direction
- Jeri McManus – design
- Julien – hair
- Michel Voyski – make-up
- Barbara Dente – stylist
