= Happy Nowhere =

Studio album by Dog's Eye View
- Released: October 10, 1995
- Genre: Alternative rock
- Length: 58:31
- Label: Columbia
- Producers: James Barton, Peter Stuart

Dog's Eye View chronology
Happy Nowhere (1995)	Daisy (1997)

Happy Nowhere is the debut studio album by the American rock band Dog's Eye View. The album is best known for its lead single, "Everything Falls Apart", which achieved considerable airplay and chart success in 1996.

The album was released at select retail locations in October 1995. Happy Nowhere received a nationwide release in the United States on January 30, 1996.

== Critical reception ==
Professional ratings
Review scores
Source	Rating
AllMusic	2.5/5 stars

The Los Angeles Daily News wrote: "Packed with catchy, well-constructed acoustic-based songs with peppy up-to-date arrangements, Happy Nowhere ... reveals why Stuart was taken under the wing of both Counting Crows and Tori Amos on tour."

== Chart ==
The album reached number one on the Billboard Heatseekers and number seventy-seven on the Billboard 200.

== Track listing ==
All tracks written and composed by Peter Stuart, except where indicated.

1. "I Wish I Was Here" – 5:48
2. "Everything Falls Apart" – 3:54
3. "Small Wonders" – 4:02
4. "The Prince's Favorite Son" – 4:06
5. "Cottonmouth" – 4:24
6. "Haywire" – 5:59
7. "Would You Be Willing" – 3:02
8. "Speed of Silence" – 4:17
9. "Waterline" – 3:56
10. "What I Know Now" – 3:23
11. "Subject to Change" (Arch Alcantara and Peter Stuart) – 4:35
12. "Bulletproof and Bleeding" – 4:25
13. "Shine" – 6:40

== Personnel ==
- John Abbey – double bass, electric bass, guitarrón, cello, guitar
- Alan Bezozi – drums, percussion
- Oren Bloedow – electric guitar, baritone guitar, lap steel guitar, classical guitar, resonator guitar
- Marvin Etzioni – mandolin, electric guitar
- Danny Frankel – percussion
- Brad Peterson – backing vocals
- Peter Stuart – vocals, acoustic guitar, electric guitar
