= Let It Bee =

Studio album by Voice of the Beehive
- Released: 20 June 1988
- Recorded: 1987–1988
- Genre: Alternative rock; pop
- Length: 45:03 (U.S. version)
- Label: London
- Producer: Pete Collins; Marvin Etzioni; Hugh Jones

Voice of the Beehive chronology
Let It Bee (1988)	Honey Lingers (1991)

Singles from Let It Bee
- 1. "Just a City" Released: 1987; 2. "I Say Nothing" Released: 1987; 3. "I Walk the Earth" Released: 1988; 4. "Don't Call Me Baby" Released: 1988; 5. "I Say Nothing (reissue)" Released: 1988; 6. "I Walk the Earth (reissue)" Released: 1988; 7. "Man in the Moon" Released: 1988

Professional ratings
Review scores
Source	Rating
AllMusic	3.5/5 stars
Record Collector	4/5 stars
The Village Voice	A−

Let It Bee is the debut album by American alternative pop rock band Voice of the Beehive. Released in 1988 on London Records, the album earned positive reviews from music critics and was a success on U.S. college radio stations. In the UK, the album reached No. 13 on the albums chart in its debut week ending 2 July 1988. The album peaked at No. 53 in Australia on the ARIA albums chart, and No. 40 in New Zealand.

The group had their first top 40 hit single in the UK with "Don't Call Me Baby" from the album, which reached No. 15. Let It Bee contained two bonus tracks on the U.S. edition (they were not listed on the CD cover, but were listed within the text on the disc).

== Track listing ==
1. "The Beat of Love" (Tracey Bryn, Brad Nack, temptation rap by Melissa Brooke) – 4:08
2. "Sorrow Floats" (Bryn) – 4:23
3. "Don't Call Me Baby" (Bryn, Mike Jones) – 3:11
4. "Man in the Moon" (Bryn, Brooke) – 3:16
5. "What You Have Is Enough" (Bryn) – 2:38
6. "Oh Love" (Brooke, Jones) – 2:59
7. "I Walk the Earth" (Nack) – 3:42
8. "Trust Me" (Bryn) – 3:22
9. "I Say Nothing" (Bryn, Jones) – 3:32
10. "There's a Barbarian in the Back of My Car" (Bryn, Zodiac Mindwarp) – 2:38
11. "Just a City" (Bryn, Jones) – 4:27
12. "This Weak" (Bryn, Jones) (bonus track, U.S. only) – 3:14
13. "Jesus" (Lou Reed) (bonus track, U.S. only) – 3:24

== Personnel ==
=== The band ===
- Tracey Bryn – vocals and guitar
- Melissa Brooke Belland – vocals
- Mike Jones – guitars, vocals, keyboards, and keyboard programming
- Martin Brett – bass guitar and piano
- D. M. Woodgate – drums, percussion, triggers, and keyboard programming

=== Additional musicians ===
- Henrick – keyboards
- Dave Swarbrick – fiddle
- The Kick – horns, Ladbroke Grove Man on "The Beat of Love" intro
- Marvin Etzioni – mandolin, piano

=== Production ===
- Pete Collins – "The Beat of Love", "Sorrow Floats", "Don't Call Me Baby", "Man in the Moon", "I Walk the Earth", "Trust Me" and "I Say Nothing"
- Hugh Jones – "Just a City", "There's a Barbarian in the Back of My Car" and "What You Have Is Enough"
- Marvin Etzioni – "Oh Love"
- Mike Jones – "This Weak" and "Jesus"

== Charts ==
Chart (1988)	Peak position
Australia (ARIA Charts)	53
New Zealand (RIANZ)	40
United Kingdom (Official Charts Company)	13
European Albums (Music & Media)	42

=== 2022 deluxe edition ===
Chart (2022)	Peak position
Scottish Albums (OCC)	52
UK Album Sales Chart (OCC)	53
UK Independent Albums (OCC)	15

== Singles ==
- 1987 "Just a City" No.154 UK
- 1987 "I Say Nothing" No. 45 UK, No. 73 AUS
- 1988 "I Walk the Earth" No. 42 UK
- 1988 "Don't Call Me Baby" No. 15 UK, No. 48 AUS, No. 25 NZ
- 1988 "I Say Nothing" (re-issue) No. 22 UK, No. 11 U.S. Modern Rock Tracks
- 1988 "I Walk the Earth" (re-issue) No. 46 UK
- 1988 "Man in the Moon" No. 93 UK
