= Jon Wayne =

American musician

- Origin: Los Angeles, United States
- Genres: Alt-country, cowpunk
- Years active: 1983–2013

Jon Wayne was a recording alias of musician, producer and studio engineer David Vaught (November 27, 1948 – March 20, 2013) and an eponymous parody country band, conceived and formed by him in Los Angeles in the 1980s together with fellow pseudonymous session musicians.

Vaught recorded and produced the album Texas Funeral on which he also wrote the material, played and sang, accompanied by "Jimbo" (Jim Goodall) who played the drums. The group was expanded to include "Earnest Bovine" (Doug Livingston) and "Billy Bob" (Bruce Rhodewalt) who was later replaced by Timmy Turlock (Tommy Spurlock). The album was released in 1985, its intentionally ramshackle sound and lyrics parodying various Texan stereotypes, as well as musicians' mysterious identities helping it to become a cult classic over the years. One of the album's early fans was director Quentin Tarantino, who wanted to use the title track in Pulp Fiction, but couldn't find any way to contact the band for permission. Vaught was eventually put in touch with the director, who slotted "Texas Funeral" into Robert Rodriguez's film From Dusk till Dawn.

Jon Wayne also were featured in Spike Stewart's rarely seen documentary D.U.I., alongside many acts of the L.A.'s experimental art-punk noise scene of the early 1980s—such as Debt of Nature, Three Day Stubble, John Trubee & The Ugly Janitors of America and Lopez Beatles—several of whom Jon Wayne actually shared members with.

Jon Wayne continued to perform occasionally throughout the 1990s and 2000s; the second studio album, Two Graduated Jiggers was released in 2000. In 2010, Texas Funeral was reissued on LP by Jack White's Third Man Records label. Vaught's last recording as "Jon Wayne" was a cameo on Marvin Etzioni's 2012 album Marvin Country!, which he also engineered on his studio.

Vaught's credits as a studio engineer include the albums Recovering the Satellites by Counting Crows and Rocket by Primitive Radio Gods.

David Vaught died on March 20, 2013, from pancreatic cancer.

== Discography ==
=== Albums ===
- Texas Funeral (1985)
- Two Graduated Jiggers (2000)

=== Singles ===
- "Mr. Egyptian" b/w "Orange Blossom Special" (1992, 7")
- "Texas Learning Center" b/w "Death and Texas" (1999, 7")
- "Mr. Egyptian Remix" (2003, CD-r)

== Members ==
- Jon Wayne (David Vaught) - vocals, guitar, organ
- Jimbo (Jim Goodall) - drums, vocals, horns
- Earnest Bovine (Doug Livingston) - lead guitar
- Billy Bob (Bruce Rhodewalt) - bass
- Timmy Turlock (Tommy Spurlock) - bass (replaced Billy Bob as of September 9, 1991)
