= Dog's Eye View =

- Origin: Los Angeles, California
- Genre: Alternative rock
- Labels: Columbia, Vanguard

Dog's Eye View was an American rock band formed in 1994. The band is best known for "Everything Falls Apart", its 1996 hit single.

== History ==
The band was formed in 1994 by singer-songwriter Peter Stuart. Stuart founded the band after being discovered by Adam Duritz, the lead vocalist of Counting Crows. The band signed with Sony Records and released the album Happy Nowhere in 1995. The album peaked at No. 77 on the Billboard Top 200 album charts. In 1996, they had major success on radio and VH1 with the single "Everything Falls Apart", which hit No. 8 on the Top 40 Mainstream charts and No. 66 on the Billboard Hot 100. Stuart has said that he wrote the single in just fifteen minutes aboard an airplane while suffering the effects of a hangover.

Dog's Eye View performed on Sweet Relief II: Gravity of the Situation, a 1996 tribute album dedicated to Vic Chesnutt. Other artists on the album included The Smashing Pumpkins and R.E.M.

The band's second album, Daisy, was released by Sony in 1997.

In 2000, Stuart announced that he had left Columbia Records and was taking a hiatus from the band to pursue solo work. He released a solo album, Propeller, on Vanguard Records in 2002.

After an extended hiatus, Dog's Eye View released a third album (also on Vanguard); the album was entitled Tomorrow Always Comes. It featured backing vocals by singers Jason Mraz and Kelly Moneymaker, as well as an appearance from Paul Doucette of Matchbox Twenty.

== Discography ==
=== Studio albums ===
- Happy Nowhere (1995, Columbia)
- Daisy (1997, Columbia)
- Tomorrow Always Comes (2005 or 2006, Vanguard)

=== Singles ===
- "Everything Falls Apart" (1996)
- "Small Wonders" (1996)
- "Prince's Favorite Son" (1996)
- "Last Letter Home" (1997)
- "Gone Like Yesterday" (2006)
