= Honey Lingers =

Studio album by Voice of the Beehive
- Released: 12 August 1991
- Genres: Alternative rock; pop
- Length: 31:46
- Label: London
- Producers: Pat Collier; Leigh Gorman; Phil Harding; Ian Curnow; Hugh Jones; Gary Langan; Alan Tarney; Don Was

Voice of the Beehive chronology
Let It Bee (1988)	Honey Lingers (1991)	A Portrait (1991)

Singles from Honey Lingers
- 1. "Monsters and Angels" Released: 1 July 1991; 2. "I Think I Love You" Released: 16 September 1991; 3. "Perfect Place" Released: December 1991

Professional ratings
Review scores
Source	Rating
AllMusic	3/5 stars

Honey Lingers is the second album by Anglo-American alternative rock band Voice of the Beehive. Released in 1991 on London Records, the album earned positive reviews from music critics and was a success on U.S. college radio stations. The album peaked at No. 17 in the UK upon its debut on 24 August 1991, and No. 68 in Australia in July 1992.

The first single, "Monsters and Angels", became the band's first entry on the U.S. Billboard Hot 100, peaking at No. 74. It also was the band's second top-twenty single in the UK Singles Chart, peaking at No. 17. "Monsters and Angels" peaked at No. 72 on the Australian ARIA singles chart, and was their sole top-ten single on the U.S. Modern Rock Tracks chart, peaking at number eight.

The title of the album is a play on the words of the sexual act of cunnilingus. The album includes a cover version of The Partridge Family's "I Think I Love You", which became their biggest hit in Australia, peaking at No. 12.

The album was certified silver in the U.K. for shipments of 60,000 units.

== Singles ==
- 1991 "Monsters and Angels" No. 17 UK, No. 72 AUS, No. 74 U.S., No. 8 U.S. Modern Rock Tracks
- 1991 "I Think I Love You" No. 25 UK, No. 12 AUS
- 1991 "Perfect Place" No. 37 UK, No. 31 AUS

== Track listing ==
1. "Monsters and Angels" (Bryn, Jones) – 3:38
2. "Adonis Blue" (Bryn, Jones) – 3:40
3. "I Think I Love You" (Tony Romeo) – 3:13
4. "Look at Me" (Bryn, Jones) – 3:03
5. "Beauty to My Eyes" (Bryn) – 3:01
6. "Just Like You" (Brett, Bryn, Jones) – 3:22
7. "Little Gods" (Marvin Etzioni) – 2:37
8. "I'm Shooting Cupid" (Bryn, Jones) – 3:11
9. "Say It" (Bryn, Jones) – 2:28
10. "Perfect Place" (Brooke, Bryn, Jones) – 3:33

== Charts ==
Chart performance for Honey Lingers
Chart (1991–1992)	Peak position
Australian Albums (ARIA)	68
UK Albums (Official Charts)	17
European Albums (Music & Media)	52

=== 2025 deluxe edition ===
Chart (2025)	Peak position
Scottish Albums (Official Charts)	26
UK Album Sales Chart (OCC)	23
UK Independent Albums (Official Charts)	13

== Certifications ==
Certifications for Honey Lingers
Region	Certification	Certified units/sales
United Kingdom (BPI)	Silver	60,000^{^}
^{^} Shipments figures based on certification alone.
