= Tony Gilkyson =

American singer-songwriter

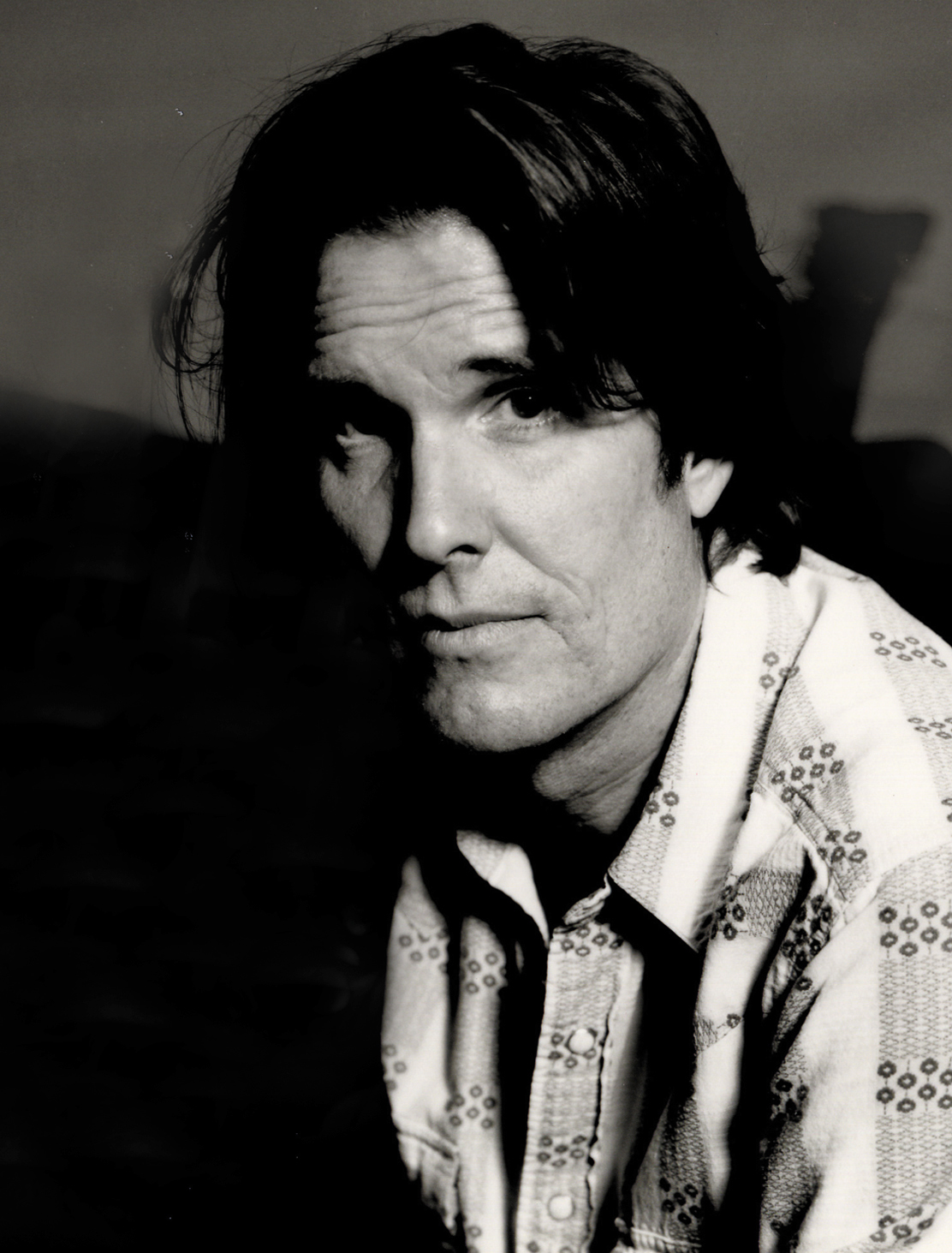
- Gilkyson in 2006

Background information
- Born: Anthony Gilkyson; August 6, 1952 (age 74); Hollywood, California, U.S.
- Genres: Punk rock, alternative rock
- Occupation: Musician
- Instrument: Guitar
- Years active: 1979–present
- Website: www.tonygilkyson.com

Tony Gilkyson (born August 6, 1952) is an American musician based in Los Angeles. He is known for membership in the groups Lone Justice and X.

== Career ==
He is the son of Jane Gilkyson and songwriter/folk musician Terry Gilkyson, as well as the brother of singer-songwriter Eliza Gilkyson.

Gilkyson is a former member of Lone Justice. He was member of the band X from 1986 to 1995 where he replaced Billy Zoom after his departure and played on two studio albums (See How We Are and Hey Zeus!) and two live albums (Live at the Whiskey a Go-Go and Unclogged).

As a solo artist, he is known for his guitar work. He is also a record producer, having worked with Exene Cervenka, Eleni Mandell, Chuck E. Weiss and Dave Alvin.

== Discography ==
- Sparko, Salinas Records, 1998, ASIN B01KAV92NE
- Goodbye Guitar, Askew Records, 2000, ASIN B00004T2MS
