= Don Heffington =

American drummer (1950–2021)

- Born: December 20, 1950; Los Angeles, California
- Died: March 24, 2021 (aged 70) Los Angeles, California
- Genres: Rock music, Americana music
- Occupation: Musician
- Instruments: Drums, guitar
- Years active: 1970–2021
- Website: donheffington.net

Don Heffington (December 20, 1950 – March 24, 2021) was an American drummer, percussionist, and songwriter. He was a founding member of the Los Angeles alternative country band Lone Justice, which he performed with from 1982 to 1985. Heffington was also a member of the bluegrass band Watkins Family Hour, recorded three solo albums, and was a session and touring musician for various artists, including Lowell George, Bob Dylan, Emmylou Harris, Jackson Browne, Victoria Williams, the Wallflowers, the Jayhawks, and Joanna Newsom.

== Early life ==
Heffington was born in Los Angeles on December 20, 1950. He grew up in a musical family – his grandmother played drums and his mother played upright bass, and they passed on their enthusiasm for jazz to Heffington. Later, Bob Dylan's album Bringing It All Back Home broadened his musical scope to include rock and roll music. As a teen, Heffington joined a jazz band, The Doug Morris Quintet, on drums.

Heffington was drummer for Emmylou Harris's Hot Band. In that capacity, he played on Blue Kentucky Girl (1979), as well as the 1983 album White Shoes.

== Career ==
=== Lone Justice ===
Heffington was a member of the first incarnation of Lone Justice, along with Maria McKee (vocals), Ryan Hedgecock (guitar), and Marvin Etzioni (bass). Heffington was with the band from 1982 until 1985. In spite of being the group's second drummer, he joined early enough in its existence that McKee spoke of him as an "original member", adding how Heffington was the only one she "never had any drama with".

The presence of Heffington in the band was described by Spin in 1985 as a "kind of professionalizing force". His sensitivity and musicality drew comparisons with Ringo Starr. Etzioni stated how Heffington, like Ringo, "didn’t play drums, he played songs". Hedgecock echoed the sentiment by dubbing Heffington the "King of Swing", recounting how he had "played with a few drummers before, but Don was the first musician that played drums I had encountered".

=== Watkins Family Hour ===
Heffington was a member of the Watkins Family Hour, led by Sara Watkins and Sean Watkins. Other members include Sebastian Steinberg (bass), Greg Leisz (pedal steel), Benmont Tench (piano), and David Garza (guitar).

=== Performing and recording ===
Heffington has played and/or recorded with many artists, including Dave Alvin, Peter Case, Vic Chesnutt, Delia Bell, Sheryl Crow, Bob Dylan, Kathleen Edwards, Lowell George, the Jayhawks, Rickie Lee Jones, Sam Phillips, Ron Sexsmith, Percy Sledge, Big Mama Thornton, Big Joe Turner, the Wallflowers, Lucinda Williams, and Dwight Yoakam.

=== Solo and collaborative albums ===
Heffington briefly reunited with McKee for her solo album You Gotta Sin to Get Saved (1993). Two years later, he and fiddler Tammy Rogers collaborated on the mostly instrumental In the Red. This marked the first of three studio albums in his career. He released his first solo album nearly two decades later titled Gloryland (2014). He said that he "wanted it to sound like some drunk falling down the stairs while he was practicing the trombone". Heffington played most of the instruments in that album and recorded with engineer David Vaught.

Contemporary Abstractions in Folk Song and Dance, released in 2015, was recorded live with Heffington (vocals, acoustic guitar), Tim Young (electric guitar) and Sebastian Steinberg (upright bass). Heffington performed as part of the Don Heffington Group with Tim Young, and Sebastian Steinberg.

== Later life ==
Heffington died on March 24, 2021, at his home in Los Feliz, Los Angeles. He was 70, and had been hospitalized for leukemia prior to his death.
