= Peter Case discography =

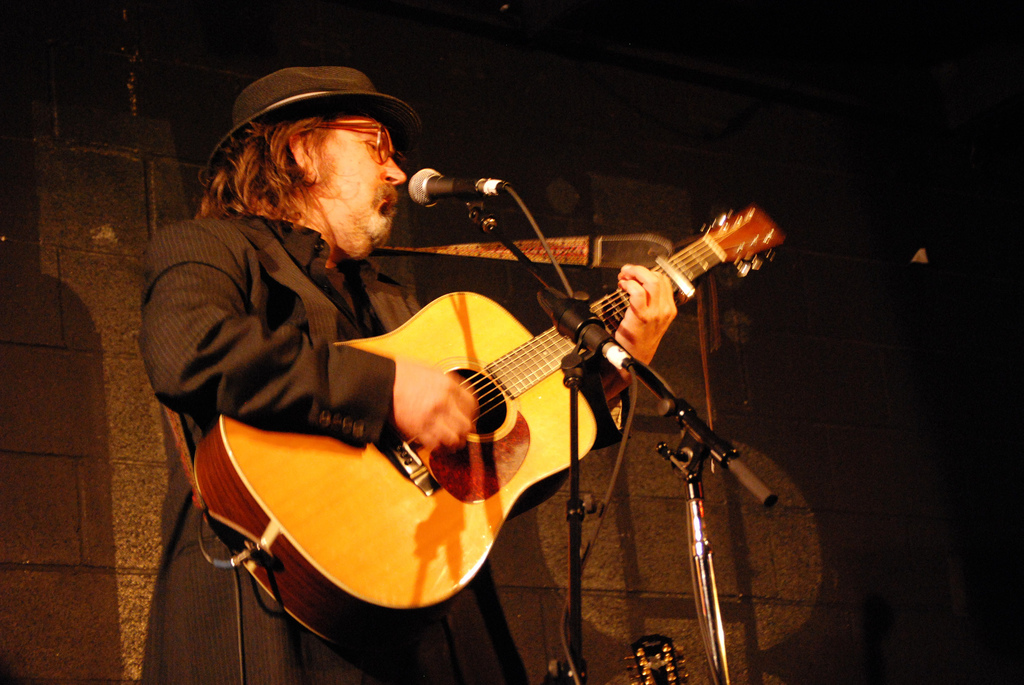
- Case at McCabe's, April 26, 2008
- Studio albums: 12
- EPs: 4
- Compilation albums: 3
- Tribute albums: 1
- Singles: 11

Peter Case is an American singer-songwriter and guitarist. His discography consists of 14 studio albums, 3 compilations, 4 EPs, 11 singles, and 1 tribute album.

== Solo albums ==
- 1986: Peter Case (Geffen)
- 1989: The Man with the Blue Post-Modern Fragmented Neo-Traditionalist Guitar (Geffen)
- 1992: Six-Pack of Love (Geffen)
- 1993: Sings Like Hell (Vanguard)
- 1995: Torn Again (Vanguard)
- 1998: Full Service No Waiting (Vanguard)
- 2000: Flying Saucer Blues (Vanguard)
- 2001: Thank You St. Jude (Travellin' Light) with David Perales
- 2002: Beeline (Vanguard)
- 2007: Let Us Now Praise Sleepy John (Yep Roc)
- 2010: Wig! (Yep Roc)
- 2015: HWY 62 (Omnivore)
- 2017: On the Way Downtown (Omnivore)
- 2016: Lost Songs and Outside Favorites (Travelin' Light)
- 2021: The Midnight Broadcast (Bandaloop Music)
- 2023: Doctor Moan (Sunset Blvd Records)

== Compilations ==
- 2004: Who's Gonna Go Your Crooked Mile? (Vanguard)
- 2007: Vanguard Visionaries: Peter Case (Vanguard)
- 2011: The Case Files (Alive) - outtakes compilation

== EPs ==
- 1986: Steel Strings (Geffen) 12" UK EP - "Steel Strings" / "Old Blue Car" / "Steel Strings (acoustic version)" / "Small Town Spree"
- 1986: Selections from Peter Case (Geffen) 12" promo EP - "Echo Wars" / "Steel Strings" / "Old Blue Car" / "I Shook His Hand (acoustic version) / "Steel Strings (acoustic version)
- 1992: Selections From Six-Pack of Love (Geffen) CD promo EP - "Dream About You" / "Deja Blues" / "Why?"
- 2007: BeeSides (Vanguard) CD promo EP - "Beyond The Blues" / "One More Mile" / "Watch Out (Previously Unreleased)" / "Gone (alternative version)"

== Singles ==
- 1986: "Steel Strings" / "Small Town Spree" (Geffen)
- 1986: "Old Blue Car" (Geffen) promo 12"
- 1989: "Put Down the Gun" (Geffen) promo CD
- 1989: "Put Down The Gun" / "Entella Hotel" (Geffen)
- 1989: "Travellin' Light" / "Put Down the Gun" (Geffen)
- 1992: "Dream About You" / "Wonderful 99" (Geffen)
- 1997: "Let Me Fall (radio edit)" (Vanguard) promo
- 1998: "Until the Next Time (radio edit)" (Vanguard) promo
- 2000: "Coulda Shoulda Woulda" (Vanguard) promo
- 2002: "Something's Coming (Edit)" (Vanguard) promo
- 2010: Live At Euclid (Euclid Records) - "Dig What You're Puttin' Down" / "Nadine"

== Tribute albums ==
- 2006: various artists - A Case for Case (Hungry For Music)

== As a member of The Nerves ==
- 1976: The Nerves EP (Bomp!)
- 2008: One Way Ticket (Alive) - reissue of 1976 EP plus demos and previously unreleased tracks
- 2009: Live! At The Pirate's Cove (Alive)

== As a member of the Breakaways ==
- 2009: Walking out on Love (The Lost Sessions) (Bomp! / Alive)

== As a member of The Plimsouls ==
- 1981: The Plimsouls (Planet)
- 1983: Everywhere at Once (Geffen)
- 1989: One Night in America (Fan Club / Oglio)
- 1998: Kool Trash (Fuel 2000 / Shaky City)
- 2010: Live! Beg, Borrow & Steal (Alive)
- 2012: Beach Town Confidential (Live at the Golden Bear 1983)
- 2012: Live At The Palace, Hollywood, California 11/16/85 (Kool Kat Muzik)

== As composer ==
=== 1979 - 1989 ===
- 1979: The Beat - The Beat (Columbia) - track 8, "U. S. A."
- 1981: The Go-Go's - Beauty and The Beat (I.R.S.) - track 3, "Tonite"
- 1983: Action Now - All Your Dreams (Lolita) - track 4, "This One Chance" (co-written with Paula Pierce)
- 1987: Marshall Crenshaw - Mary Jean & 9 Others (Warner Bros.) - track 8, "Steel Strings"
- 1987: The Nomads - Hardware (Anigo) - track 1, "Call Off Your Dogs" (co-written with Jeffrey Lee Pierce and Steven Soles)
- 1987: The Williams Brothers - Two Stories (Warner Bros.) - track 2, "Inch By Inch" (co-written with Charlotte Caffey)

=== 1990 - 1994 ===
- 1990: John Wesley Harding - Here Comes The Groom (Sire) - track 13, "Things Snowball" (co-written with John Wesley Harding)
- 1991: Four Men and a Dog - Barking Mad (CBM) - track 1, "Hidden Love"
- 1992: Los Valendas - Turtle Friend Extended (Munster) - track 13, "I Want What You Got"
- 1992: Slaters - The Big Black Bug Bled Black Blood........ (Zero Hour) - track 11, "Oldest Story In The World"
- 1993: Barrence Whitfield with Tom Russell - Hillbilly Voodoo (East Side Digital) - track 7, "Ice Water" (co-written with Lightnin' Hopkins)
- 1994: Goo Goo Dolls - Hold Me Up (Metal Blade / Priority) - track 13, "A Million Miles Away" (co-written with Chris Fradkin and Joey Alkes)

=== 1995 - 2004 ===
- 1995: Psychotic Youth - Bamboozle! (Wolverine) - track 9, "How Long Will It Take"
- 1996: Bob Neuwirth - Look Up (Watermelon) - track 5, "Beyond The Blues" (co-written with Tom Russell and Bob Neuwirth); track 8, "Everybody's Got A Job To Do" and track 10, "Traveling Light" (both songs co-written with Bob Neuwirth)
- 1997: John Prine - Live on Tour (Oh Boy) - track 5, "Space Monkey" (co-written with John Prine)
- 1998: Robert Earl Keen - Walking Distance (Arista) - track 2, "Travelin' Light" (co-written with Bob Neuwirth)
- 2001: Kevin Bowe - Love Songs & Murder Ballads (Okemah Prophets) - track 9, "Coulda Shoulda Woulda" - (co-written with Duane Jarvis and Kevin Bowe)
- 2003: Duane Jarvis - Delicious (Slewfoot) - track 1, "Coulda Shoulda Woulda" (co-written with Duane Jarvis and Kevin Bowe)

=== 2005 - present ===
- 2005: James McMurtry - Childish Things (Compadre) - track 9, "The Old Part of Town"
- 2006: Chris Smither - Leave The Light On (Signature Sounds) - track 6, "Cold Trail Blues"
- 2007: Ingram Hill - Cold in California (Hollywood) - track 4, "A Million Miles Away" (co-written with Chris Fradkin and Joey Alkes)
- 2010: Neverever - Angelic Swells (Slumberland) - track 4, "Now" (co-written with Chris Fradkin and Joey Alkes)
- 2010: Robert Randolph and the Family Band - We Walk This Road (Warner Bros.) - track 7, "I Still Belong to Jesus"; track 14, "Dry Bones" and track 16, "I'm Not Listening" (both songs co-written with Robert Randolph, T Bone Burnett, and Tonio K.)
- 2011: Mark Winsick - Turnin' Wheel (self-released) - track 7, "Rise and Shine" (co-written with Victoria Williams)
- 2015: Dogs - Shout ! (Epic) - track 2, "One Way Ticket"

== As producer ==
- 1987: The Balancing Act - New Campfire Songs (I.R.S.)
- 1990: Flophouse - Flophouse (Heyday)
- 2005: Plastic Letters - Don't Tell Your Boyfriend (Screaming Apple)
- 2011: Dead Rock West - Bright Morning Stars (Audio & Video Labs)
- 2013: Claudia Russell - All Our Luck is Changing (Radio Rhythm)
- 2014: Eva De Roovere - Chanticleer (self-released)
- 2014: Wayne Haught - Fingers (self-released)
- 2015: Bob Hillman - Lost Soul (Audio & Video Labs)

== As primary artist/song contributor ==
- 1989: Fast Folk Musical Magazine: Los Angeles (Fast Folk Musical Magazine) - track 13, "Punch & Socko"
- 1994: various artists - Tulare Dust : A Songwriter's Tribute to Merle Haggard (HighTone) - track 3, "A Working Man Can't Get Nowhere Today"
- 2001: various artists - Avalon Blues: A Tribute to the Music of Mississippi John Hurt (Vanguard) - track 6, "Monday Morning Blues" (with Dave Alvin)
- 2004: various artists - Por Vida: A Tribute to the Songs of Alejandro Escovedo (Or Music) - track 1–15, "The End"
- 2009: various artists - Man of Somebody's Dreams: A Tribute to Chris Gaffney (Yep Roc) - track 5, "Six Nights A Week"
- 2010: various artists - Riding The Range: The Songs of Townes Van Zandt (Righteous) - track 9, "If I Was Washington" (with Stan Ridgway)
- 2013: various artists - I Am the Resurrection: a Tribute to John Fahey (Vanguard) - track 12, "When The Catfish Is In Bloom"
- 2013: various artists - The Del Shannon Tribute: Songwriter, Vol. 1 ([Rockbeat) - track 8, "Keep Searchin'" (with Carla Olson and Kelley Ryan); track 10, "I Go to Pieces" (with Carla Olson and Drysdales)
- 2014: various artists - Link of Chain: A Songwriters' Tribute to Chris Smither (Signature Sounds) - track 14, "Caveman"

== Also appears on ==
- 1985: The Beat Farmers - Tales of The New West (Rhino Records) - backing vocals on track 5, "California Kid"
- 1987: Leslie Phillips - The Turning (Myrrh) - vocals
- 1988: Bob Neuwirth - Back To The Front (Gold Castle) - vocals
- 1988: T Bone Burnett - The Talking Animals (Columbia) - vocals
- 1988: Tonio K. - Notes From The Lost Civilization (A&M / What?) - vocals
- 1990: John Wesley Harding - Here Comes The Groom (Sire) - guitar, vocals on track 13, "Things Snowball"
- 1992: Marvin - The Mandolin Man (Regional) - harmonica on track 11, "My Ultimate Home"
- 1995: The Dark Bob - An Ever Ominous Dream (MITB) - vocals on track 6, "He Knows What I Need"
- 1997: Tonio K. - Ole (Gadfly) - vocals
- 2004: The Crickets - The Crickets & Their Buddies (Sovereign Artists) - harmonica on track 3, '"Not Fade Away"
- 2005: various artists - Walk the Line (soundtrack) (Wind-up) - acoustic guitar, harmonica
- 2007: Cindy Lee Berryhill - Beloved Stranger (Populuxe) - guitar, vocal
- 2007: Bert Deivert - Takin' Sam's Advice (Gravitation) - guitar, vocal on the track Broke and Hungry
- 2008: David Mansfield - The Guitar (Soundtrack) (Lakeshore) - guitar, vocal
- 2013: Carla Olson - Have Harmony, Will Travel (Busted Flat) - guitar (acoustic, electric), vocals
