= Don Heffington discography =

This is the discography for American rock musician Don Heffington.

== As leader ==
- In the Red with Tammy Rogers (Dead Reckoning, 1995)
- Gloryland (self-released, 2014)
- Contemporary Abstractions in Folk Song and Dance (self-released, 2016)

== As producer ==
- 2005 The Creekdippers, Mystic Theatre (Glitterhouse)
- 2006 Ramsay Midwood, Popular Delusions & The Madness of Cows (Farmwire)
- 2009 Amy Allison, Sheffield Streets (Urban Myth)
- 2014 Chuck E. Weiss, Red Beans and Weiss (ANTI-)

== As sideman ==
With Amy Allison

- Sad Girl (Diesel Only, 2001)
- Sheffield Streets (Urban Myth, 2008)

With Dave Alvin

- Ashgrove (Yep Roc, 2004)
- West of the West (Yep Roc, 2006)
- Eleven Eleven (Yep Roc, 2011)
- Lost Time with Phil Alvin (Yep Roc, 2015)

With Neal Casal

- Fade Away Diamond Time (Zoo, 1995)
- Basement Dreams (Fargo, 1998)

With Peter Case

- Sings Like Hell (Vanguard, 1995)
- Torn Again (Vanguard, 1995)
- Full Service No Waiting (Vanguard, 1998)
- Flying Saucer Blues (Vanguard, 2000)
- Who's Gonna Go Your Crooked Mile? (Vanguard, 2004)
- HWY 62 (Omnivore, 2015)
- On the Way Downtown: Recorded Live on FolkScene (Omnivore, 2017)

With Vic Chesnutt

- Silver Lake (New West, 2003)
- Ghetto Bells (New West, 2005)

With A. J. Croce

- Twelve Tales (Compass, 2013)

With Bob Dylan

- Empire Burlesque (Columbia, 1985)
- Knocked Out Loaded (Columbia, 1986)

With Marvin Etzioni

- The Mandolin Man (Restless, 1992)
- Weapons Of The Spirit (Restless, 1994)

With Tony Gilkyson

- Sparko (Askew, 1997)
- Goodbye Guitar (Rolling Sea, 2006)

With Jimmie Dale Gilmore

- Braver Newer World (Elektra, 1996)
- One Endless Night (Rounder, 2000)

With Barry Goldberg

- Stoned Again (Antone's, 2002)
- In The Groove (Sunset Blvd, 2017)

With Lone Justice

- Lone Justice (Geffen, 1985)
- This Is Lone Justice: The Vaught Tapes 1983 (Omnivore, 2014)

With Christy McWilson

- The Lucky One (Hightone, 2000)
- Bed of Roses (Hightone, 2002)

With Buddy Miller

- Your Love and Other Lies (Hightone, 1995)
- Cruel Moon (HighTone, 1999)

With Fernando Ortega

- Night of Your Return (RPI, 1996)
- Home (RPI, 2000)

With Sam Phillips

- Martinis & Bikinis (Omnivore, 1994)
- Omnipop (It's Only a Flesh Wound Lambchop) (Virgin, 1996)

With Amy Rigby

- Diary of A Mod Housewife (Koch, 1996)
- Middlescence (Koch, 1998)

With Adam Sandler

- What's Your Name? (Warner Bros., 1997)
- Stan and Judy's Kid (Warner Bros., 1999)
- Shhh...Don't Tell (Warner Bros., 2004)

With Ron Sexsmith

- Forever Endeavour (Cooking Vinyl, 2013)
- Carousel One (Compass, 2015)

With Rick Shea

- Sawbones (Aim 2000)
- Bound for Trouble (Tres Pescadores, 2005)

With Victoria Williams

- Loose (Atlantic, 1994)
- Water to Drink (Atlantic, 2000)
- Sings Some Ol' Songs (Atlantic, 2002)
- Victoria Williams & The Loose Band-Town Hall 1995 (Fire America, 2017)

With others

- 1980 Seals and Crofts, The Longest Road (Rhino)
- 1983 Delia Bell, Delia Bell (Warner Bros.) – reissued in 2006 on Wounded Bird
- 1983 Emmylou Harris, White Shoes (Warner Bros.)
- 1983 Leo Kottke, Time Step (Chrysalis)
- 1991 Carla Olson and Mick Taylor, Too Hot For Snakes (Razor Edge)
- 1993 Maria McKee, You Gotta Sin to Get Saved (Geffen)
- 1993 Chuck Prophet, Balinese Dancer (China / Homestead)
- 1995 The Jayhawks, Tomorrow the Green Grass (American)
- 1995 Kieran Kane, Dead Rekoning (Dead Reckoning)
- 1995 David Olney, High, Wide and Lonesome (Philo)
- 1995 Tom Russell, The Rose of the San Joaquin (Hightone)
- 1995 various artists, A Testimonial Dinner: The Songs of XTC (Thirsty Ear)
- 1996 Rosie Flores, Honky Tonk Reprise (Rounder)
- 1996 Bob Neuwirth, Look Up (Watermelon)
- 1996 Kim Stockwood, Bonavista (EMI Canada)
- 1996 Daniel Tashian, Sweetie (Elektra)
- 1996 The Wallflowers, Bringing Down the Horse (Interscope)
- 1997 Jonny Kaplan, California Heart (Muna Tea)
- 1997 David Poe, David Poe (550 Music)
- 1998 Sinead Lohan, No Mermaid (Interscope)
- 1998 Chuck Pyle, Keepin' Time by the River (Bee 'N Flower)
- 1998 Chris Stills, 100 Year Thing (Atlantic)
- 1998 various artists, Pearls in the Snow: The Songs of Kinky Friedman (Kinkajou)
- 1999 Blue Mountain, Tales of a Traveler (Roadrunner)
- 1999 The Derailers, Full Western Dress (Sire)
- 1999 Matthew Sweet, In Reverse (Volcano)
- 2000 Nick Binkley, Let the Boy Jam (PSB)
- 2000 The Drowners, Is There Something On Your Mind? (Wind-Up)
- 2000 Ramsay Midwood, Shoot Out at the OK Chinese Restaurant (Vanguard)
- 2000 Geoff Muldaur, Password (Hightone)
- 2000 Randy Weeks, Madeline (Hightone)
- 2001 Annie Rapid, Flood (Orchard)
- 2001 Danni Leigh, Divide and Conquer (Audium Entertainment)
- 2001 Over The Rhine, Films For Radio (Narada)
- 2001 Chuck E. Weiss, Old Souls & Wolf Tickets (Slow River)
- 2001 Eddie Zip, New Orleans Live in Hollywood (DJM)
- 2002 Pieta Brown, Pieta Brown (Rubric)
- 2002 Mike Stinson, Jack of All Heartache (Boronda)
- 2002 Mark Olson, December's Child (Dualtone)
- 2002 Peter Stuart, Propeller (Vanguard)
- 2003 Eleni Mandell, Country for True Lovers (Zedtone)
- 2003 Dwight Yoakam, Population Me (New West)
- 2004 Moot Davis, Moot Davis (Little Dog)
- 2004 Amy Farris, Anyway (Yep Roc)
- 2004 Peter Himmelman, Unstoppable Forces (Majestic)
- 2004 Tift Merritt, Tambourine (Lost Highway)
- 2004 Lila Nelson, Still Got the Farm (self-released)
- 2004 Graham Parker, Your Country (Bloodshot)
- 2004 Percy Sledge, Shining Through the Rain (Varèse Sarabande)
- 2005 Red Grammer, Be Bop Your Best (Red Note)
- 2005 Gratitude, Gratitude (Atlantic)
- 2005 Grey DeLisle, Iron Flowers (Sugar Hill)
- 2005 Judy Henske, She Sang California (Fair Star Music)
- 2006 Chris and Thomas, Land of Sea (Defend Music)
- 2006 Tim Easton, Ammunition (New West)
- 2006 Albert Lee, Road Runner (Sugar Hill)
- 2006 Kip Boardman, Hello I Must Be (Mesmer)
- 2006 Marley's Ghost, Spooked (Sage Arts)
- 2006 Joanna Newsom, Ys (Drag City)
- 2007 Dead Rock West, Honey and Salt (Populuxe)
- 2007 King Wilkie, Low Country Suite (Rounder)
- 2007 Patrick Park, Everyone's in Everyone (Curb Appeal)
- 2007 Jack Tempchin, Songs (Audio & Video Labs, Inc.)
- 2007 Joe Cocker, Hymn for My Soul (EMI)
- 2008 Ted Russell Kamp, Poor Man's Paradise (Dualtone)
- 2008 Greg Copeland, Diana and James (Inside Recordings)
- 2008 Kathleen Edwards, Asking for Flowers (Zoë)
- 2008 Inara George, An Invitation (Everloving)
- 2010 Roy Jay, Fairfax Avenue (Rock Ridge)
- 2010 Stan Ridgway, Neon Mirage (A440)
- 2011 Orchestra Superstring, Easy (Dionysus)
- 2012 Mark M. Dawson, The Writing Wall (Dawsophone)
- 2012 Don Michael Sampson, Coyote (Red Horse)
- 2013 The Living Sisters, Run for Cover (Vanguard)
- 2013 Carrie Rodriguez, Give Me All You Got (Ninth Street Opus)
- 2014 Wayne Haught, Fingers (Resist Not)
- 2015 Jackson Browne, Standing in the Breach (Inside Recordings)
- 2015 Miranda Mulholland, Whipping Boy (Fontana North)
- 2016 Jim Kweskin and Geoff Muldaur, Penny's Farm (Omnivore Recordings)
- 2017 Jerry Yester, Pass Your Light Around (Omnivore Recordings)
- 2017 Shelby Lynne and Allison Moorer, Not Dark Yet (Thirty Tigers)
- 2019 Big Kettle Drum, I Thought You'd Be Bigger (Kettlehead)
- 2019 Various Artists, If You're Going to the City: A Tribute to Mose Allison for Sweet Relief (Fat Possum)
- 2019 Josie Cotton, Everything Is Oh Yeah (Kitten Robot)
