= The Midwest Beat =

- Origin: Milwaukee, Wisconsin, United States
- Genres: Angry Bubblegum; Garage Rock
- Years active: 2005–2018
- Labels: Kind Turkey Records, Dusty Medical Records, Wild Honey Records, Eradicator Records, Hosehead Records, Waterslide Records, Tax Return Records, Duck on Monkey Records
- Members: Matt Joyce; Kyle Denton; Christopher Capelle; Tim Schweiger
- Website: Official band site

The Midwest Beat is a band from Milwaukee, Wisconsin, United States. Formed in 2005, the band is noted for their concise and uptempo songs, saturated in vocal harmonies. The Midwest Beat, who play Americana music inspired by country rock and folk rock, have toured Europe three times and released a handful of full-length albums, singles and EPs.

== Band members ==
=== Current line-up ===
- Matt Joyce - guitar, vocals
- Kyle Denton - guitar, vocals
- Christopher Capelle - drums
- Tim Schweiger - bass, vocals

=== Engineer ===
- Kyle "Motor" Urban

== Discography ==
=== Albums ===
- At the Gates CD, 2009, Duck on Monkey Records
- At the Gates LP, 2010, Dusty Medical Records
- Gone Not Lost LP, 2011, Dusty Medical Records
- Gone Not Lost LP, 2011, Wild Honey Records
- Singles LP, 2012, Wild Honey Records
- Gone Not Lost CD, 2013, Waterslide Records
- Free of Being CD, 2014, Waterslide Records
- Free of Being LP, 2014, Dusty Medical Records/Wild Honey Records
- Incantations LP, 2020, Dusty Medical Records

=== EPs ===
- Happy Holidays from The Midwest Beat CD, 2006, self-released split with The Vertebreakers
- The Midwest Beat EP, CD, 2007, self-released
- Live on WMSE EP, CD, 2011, self-released European tour CD

=== Cassettes ===
- Belladonna split with The Cave Weddings, cassette, 2009
- Sister Mary Katherine split with Eric & the Happy Thoughts, cassette, 2010
- The Midwest Beat EP, cassette, 2011, Hosehead Records
- Unreleased and Live: 2005-2011, cassette, 2012, Kind Turkey Records
- Free of Being, cassette, 2015, Secret People Records
- Incantations, cassette, 2019, No Coast Recordings

=== 7 Inch Records ===
- The Midwest Beat EP, 2x7", 2008, Dusty Medical Records
- Bring the Water 7", 2009, Tax Return Records
- Back to Mono 7", 2011, Eradicator Records
- Blue Tippecanoe 7", 2012, Sound Asleep Records
- Apology Accepted 7", 2012, Certified PR Records
- Carol Anne 7", 2015, Wild Honey Records

=== Compilations ===
- Local Love Fest CD, 2011, includes a cover of The Hussy's "Sexi Ladi"
- Un Mondo di Canzonette - OndaDrops Vol.8, 2013, includes a cover of Neil Young's "Everybody Knows This is Nowhere"
- DMR 10th Anniversary Festival compilation CD, Dusty Medical Records (DMR-46), 2015, includes "Girl Gone West"
- Hooliganism Vol. 3 compilation cassette, Berserk Records (CS323), 2016, includes "High Life"
- The Benefit of Things to Come compilation digital, Wild Honey Records, 2020, includes "Henhouse Blues"

== Related bands ==
- The Beat (American band)
- Paul Collins (musician)
- Tommy Stinson
