= Peter Case (album) =

Studio album by Peter Case
- Released: 1986
- Studios: Ocean Way Recording, Sunset Sound Factory, Capitol Recorders, Los Angeles, and Eagle Audio, Fort Worth, Texas
- Genre: Rock
- Length: 47:23
- Label: Geffen
- Producer: J. Henry ("T-Bone") Burnett

Peter Case chronology
Peter Case (1986)	The Man with the Blue Post-Modern Fragmented Neo-Traditionalist Guitar (1989)

Singles from Peter Case
- 1. "Steel Strings / Small Town Spree" Released: 1986; 2. "Old Blue Car" Released: 1986 (promo)

Peter Case is the debut album by American power pop singer-songwriter Peter Case, released in 1986 on Geffen Records. Omnivore Records reissued it with additional tracks in September 2016.

== History ==
Peter Case was a member of the Los Angeles power pop group The Nerves along with Paul Collins (later of The Beat), and Jack Lee. After the breakup of the Nerves, Case made several albums in the early 1980s with The Plimsouls. This is his first solo album after the breakup of the Plimsouls.

Case was accompanied by 20 other musicians including T-Bone Burnett and Mitchell Froom, guitarist Mike Campbell, John Hiatt, drummers Jim Keltner and Jerry Marotta, Roger Mcguinn, Van Dyke Parks, and his then-wife Victoria Williams, among others. Case wrote five of the songs on the LP, and co-wrote six others including three with Burnett, one with Burnett and Marotta, and one with Williams. One song features lyrics by Case with music originally written by Lightnin' Hopkins. The album closes with a cover of Shane Macgowan's "Pair of Brown Eyes", originally performed by MacGowan's band The Pogues. The song "I Shook His Hand" was originally performed live in a harder-rocking version with the Plimsouls. A promo-only release from the album included a fully acoustic version of "I Shook His Hand."

The liner notes included the following unusual message:

The phone rang and stirred me from a bleary-eyed reverie. I sat down, poured myself a glass of scotch and waited for the phone to ring. It rang and rang. My bags were packed and I was out on the street. Three hours and three days later and it was the imaginary man in a snake dance. The recipe: the kid said he'd been standing on the same corner for a thousand nights. I haven't seen him for a while, guess nothing much came of it – hope he's alright. Once you get used to it – it's too bad.

Rain soaked boots and a bad cough led to the youthful deportee. She said she knew Rants & Charlie James. So all I had was some faded flowers, an empty bottle and a broken phonograph record. Maybe some thank yous would be in order. Thank you, thank you, thank you, thank you, thank you.

I guess there's someone somewhere in a big room with a bright light and a heat lamp and a stamp collection and a stethoscope and they're checking out their own heartbeat – checking on the heartbeat of this grand and glorious land – yep I guess so.

My sister told me on the phone she heard someone on the radio singing about small towns in America. I said I didn't know any songs about America – these songs are about sin and salvation. Have fun.
Love, Peter Case

== Critical reception ==
Professional ratings
Review scores
Source	Rating
AllMusic	4/5 stars
Robert Christgau	B

Music critic Steve Kurutz of AllMusic praised the album and wrote "... the primarily acoustic songs are adeptly arranged and filled with great melodies. Case has a reputation for being a bit too clever at times and on occasion the album's lyrics can be a bit obtuse, but overall songs like the Van Dyke Parks-arranged 'Small Town Spree' and the harmonica-driven 'Old Blue Car' rock with an immediacy that hits the listener where it should, in the gut rather than between the ears." Music critic Robert Christgau rated the record as a "B" on his rating scale and wrote of the record; "Case's problem is that he's a born actor who won't cop to it... hence he's no more convincing now than he was when he led a group named after the Beatles' sneakers."

== Track listing ==
All songs written by Peter Case except where noted.

1. "Echo Wars" (Peter Case, T-Bone Burnett) – 3:21
2. "Steel Strings" – 3:49
3. "Three Days Straight" (Case, Burnett) – 3:37
4. "More Than Curious" (Case, Burnett) – 4:37
5. "I Shook His Hand" – 3:40
6. "Small Town Spree" – 4:01
7. "Old Blue Car" (Case, Marvin Etzioni, Victoria Williams) – 3:52
8. "Walk in the Woods" – 3:40
9. "Horse and Crow" – 4:18
10. "Icewater" (words by Case, music by Lightnin' Hopkins) – 2:47
11. "Satellite Beach" (Case, Burnett, Rick Marotta, Williams) – 4:12
12. "Pair of Brown Eyes" (Shane MacGowan) – 5:45

2016 Omnivore reissue (OVCD-184)
No.	Title	Writer(s)	Length
1.	"Steel Strings" (Acoustic version)	Peter Case
2.	"I Shook His Hand" (Acoustic version)	Case
3.	"Trusted Friend"	Case
4.	"North Coast Blues"	Case
5.	"Toughest Gang in Town"	Case
6.	"Horse & Crow" (Alternate version)	Case
7.	"More Than Curious" (Early version)	Case, Burnett

Note

- "Steel Strings" (Acoustic version) and "I Shook His Hand" (Acoustic version) were originally released on a Geffen Records promotional record (PRO-A-2479) in 1986.

== Personnel ==
Adapted from the AllMusic credits.

- T-Bone Burnett – acoustic guitar, record producer
- Peter Case – vocals
- Mitchell Froom – producer
- Jim Keltner – drums
- Roger McGuinn – guitar (12 string)
- David Miner – bass
- Van Dyke Parks – keyboards
