= Thank You St. Jude =

Studio album by Peter Case
- Released: 2001
- Genre: Alternative rock, alternative country, folk rock
- Label: Prima
- Producer: Peter Case

Peter Case chronology
Flying Saucer Blues (2000)	Thank You St. Jude (2001)	Beeline (2002)

Thank You St. Jude is an album by American singer-songwriter Peter Case, released in 2001.

The album consists of rearranged acoustic versions of songs previously recorded by Case or favorites from his live concerts.

== Critical reception ==
Professional ratings
Review scores
Source	Rating
Allmusic	4.5/5 stars

Music critic Denise Sullivan of Allmusic praised the album, writing "This disc is an essential part of the Case catalog – a document of the state of the acoustic rock nation he had a hand in reviving in the mid-'80s and a testament to the evolution and staying power of his compositions. At the same time, new fans, particularly of acoustic folk, will find this a good introduction to the rich catalog of one of the most hardworking and consistently innovative songwriters in the hard-rockin' folk section."

== Track listing ==
All songs written by Peter Case unless otherwise noted.

1. "Ice Water" – 2:57
2. "Beyond the Blues" (Case, Bob Neuwirth, Tom Russell) – 3:44
3. "Someday Blues" (Sleepy John Estes) – 3:18
4. "Put Down the Gun" – 3:54
5. "Two Angels" – 4:01
6. "Ginseng Blues" (Kentucky Ramblers) – 3:15
7. "Hidden Love" – 4:09
8. "Travellin' Light" (Case, Neuwirth) – 3:48
9. "Poor Old Tom" – 4:13
10. "Leavin' Home" (Charlie Poole) – 3:21
11. "Entella Hotel" – 5:19
12. "One More Mile" – 3:01
13. "4th of July/Christmas Rag" (Case, Neuwirth) – 3:07

== Personnel ==
- Peter Case – vocals, guitar, harmonica
- Sandy Chila – drums, banjo, harmonium, percussion
- David Jackson – upright bass
- David Perales – violin, harmony vocals

Production

- Peter Case – producer
- Michael Meltzer – engineer
- Tom Lukens – engineer
- Doug Schwartz – mastering
- Greg Allen – package design, photography
- Doug Erb – illustrations
