= The Beat (American band album) =

Studio album by the Beat
- Released: October 1979
- Recorded: June 1979
- Studio: United Western (Hollywood); Cherokee (Hollywood)
- Genre: Power pop
- Length: 31:16
- Label: Columbia
- Producer: Bruce Botnick

The Beat chronology
The Beat (1979)	The Kids Are the Same (1981)

Professional ratings
Review scores
Source	Rating
AllMusic	4.5/5 stars
Christgau's Record Guide	B
Rolling Stone	3.5/5 stars
Smash Hits	6/10

The Beat is the debut album by American power pop band the Beat, released in 1979 on Columbia Records.

The liner notes give special thanks to the following people: "Eddie Money (without you we wouldn't be here now) and Jerry Pompili, all the people at CBS & B.G.P., Don Ellis, Ken Sasano, The Masque, all the boys at the Parking Lot, David Gales, Bill Graham and Marcy."

== Track listing ==
All songs written by Paul Collins, except where noted.

1. "Rock n Roll Girl" – 2:16
2. "I Don't Fit In" – 2:46
3. "Different Kind of Girl" (Collins, Steven Huff) – 3:23
4. "Don't Wait Up for Me" – 3:02
5. "You Won't Be Happy" – 2:20
6. "Walking Out on Love" – 1:44
7. "Work-a-Day World" – 3:05
8. "U.S.A." (Collins, Peter Case) – 2:12
9. "Let Me into Your Life" (Collins, Eddie Money) – 2:35
10. "Working Too Hard" – 1:57
11. "You and I" – 2:47
12. "Look but Don't Touch" – 3:09

== Personnel ==
Credits adapted from liner notes.

The Beat

- Paul Collins – rhythm guitar, lead vocals
- Steven Huff – bass, second vocals
- Larry Whitman – lead guitar, third vocals
- Michael Ruiz – drums, percussion

Additional personnel

- Bruce Botnick – production
- Rik "Aloha" Pekkonen – engineering
- Rodney Lovett – assistant engineering
- Dave Costel – assistant engineering
- Bernie Grundman – mastering at A&M Studios
