= Sings Like Hell (music series) =

The Sings Like Hell music series is a popular monthly concert series based at the historic Lobero Theater in Santa Barbara, California.

== Series background ==
Created by Austin-based music producer, Peggie Jones, Sings Like Hell was first held in August 1997, and has since featured almost 240 shows staged across a twenty-year period. Drawing its name from the 1993 Peter Case album, Sings Like Hell, the subscriber-based series features two, six-show programs each year, primarily highlighting the talent of singers-songwriters using a variety of styles and influences, from Americana to Blues, Folk, Roots music and World Music. Featured artists have included among others, Jeff Bridges and the Abiders, Jackson Browne, Emmylou Harris, Jason Isbell, Bonnie Riatt, Damien Rice, Richard Thompson, and Gillian Welch.
