= Everywhere at Once (The Plimsouls album) =

Studio album by the Plimsouls
- Released: 24 May 1983
- Studio: The Lighthouse and Mama Jo's, North Hollywood, CA; The Pasha Music House, Hollywood, CA; Record One, Los Angeles, CA
- Genre: Power pop
- Length: 37:35
- Label: Geffen
- Producer: Jeff Eyrich

The Plimsouls chronology
The Plimsouls (1981)	Everywhere at Once (1983)	Kool Trash (1998)

Singles from Everywhere at Once
- 1. "A Million Miles Away" Released: 1982 (reissued 1983); 2. "Oldest Story in the World" Released: 1983

Professional ratings
Review scores
Source	Rating
AllMusic	4/5 stars
Robert Christgau	B−

Everywhere at Once is the second studio album and major-label debut by American power pop band the Plimsouls, released in 1983 by Geffen Records. The album reached #186 on the Billboard albums chart. It includes the radio hit "A Million Miles Away" which reached #11 on Billboard's Top Rock Tracks. It would be the band's last album until 1998's Kool Trash.

== Background ==
In 1981, the Plimsouls released their self titled debut album through Planet Records but left the label the same year, dissatisfied with the lack of promotion by their label. The album reached #153 on the Billboard albums chart. The following year, the band released the independent single "A Million Miles Away" on their own Shaky City label, after which they signed with Geffen Records for Everywhere at Once.

== Critical reception ==
Retrospectively, AllMusic felt that the album has mixed results, writing, "While the change to a major label did have a profound impact on the band, it wasn't always for the best. While Jeff Eyrich's somewhat heavy-handed production did take a little air out of their performance, the end result is far less clinical than other major-label mainstream rock records of the day."

Trouser Press wrote that the album is "bubbling with undiminished fire and melody."

== Track listing ==
1. "Shaky City" (Peter Case, Eddie Muñoz) – 2:27
2. "Magic Touch" (Case, Muñoz) – 3:19
3. "Oldest Story in the World" (Case) – 3:19
4. "Lie, Beg, Borrow, and Steal" (Ronny Weiss) – 2:45
5. "Play the Breaks" (Case, Muñoz, David Pahoa, Lou Ramirez, Jeff Eyrich) – 4:17
6. "How Long Will It Take?" (Case) – 2:30
7. "A Million Miles Away" (Case, Joey Alkes, Chris Fradkin) – 3:34
8. "My Life Ain't Easy" (Eddy Grant, Lincoln Gordon, Dervan Gordon) – 2:37
9. "Inch By Inch" (Case, Andrew Williams, Charlotte Caffey) – 2:35
10. "I'll Get Lucky" (Case) – 2:42
11. "Everywhere at Once" (Case) – 3:19

1992 reissue bonus track

12. "Hobo" (Case, Muñoz, Pahoa, Ramirez) – 3:23

Note

- Track 12 was released as the B-side to the "Oldest Story in the World" single; recorded at Baby O' Recorders, Hollywood, CA; produced by Jeff Eyrich.

== Personnel ==
Adapted from the album liner notes.

The Plimsouls

- Peter Case – vocals, six and twelve-string guitar, harmonica
- Eddie Muñoz – lead guitar, backing vocals
- David Pahoa – bass, backing vocals
- Lou Ramirez – drums, maracas, tambourine, timbales, castanets, backing vocals

Additional musicians

- Jeff Eyrich – Casio keyboard, guitar
- Andy Williams – backing vocals
- David Williams – backing vocals
- Steve Hunter – acoustic guitar (3)
- Phast Phreddie – backing vocals (4)
- Scott Wilk – Farfisa organ (4)
- William Norwood – high vocal (6)
- Brandon Matheson – tom toms (8)

Technical

- Jeff Eyrich – producer
- Dennis Kirk – engineer
- Jim Hill – engineer
- Win Kutz – engineer
- Greg Ladanyi – mixing (1–6, 9–12)
- Larry Brown – mixing (7, 8)
- Bobby Macias – assistant engineer, mixing assistant
- Wayne Tanouye – assistant engineer, mixing assistant
- Eduardo Fayad – assistant engineer
- Laura Livingston – assistant engineer
- Laurie Allison – assistant engineer
- Mikey Davis – assistant engineer
- Sandra Wilson – assistant engineer
- Steve Ford – assistant engineer
- Dennis Densmore – mixing assistant
- Dan Hersch – mastering
- David J. Donnelly – mastering supervisor
- Mick Haggerty – art direction, photography
- Mike Fink – design, artwork
