= Why Wait =

Why Wait may refer to:

- Why Wait (album), by Kristy Lee Cook
- "Why Wait" (song), by Rascal Flatts
- Why Wait", a song by Shakira from the album She Wolf

== See also ==
- Why the Wait, by Ingram Hill
