= The Kids Are the Same =

Studio album by Paul Collins' Beat
- Released: 1982
- Genre: Rock, power pop, pop
- Label: Columbia
- Producer: Bruce Botnick

Paul Collins' Beat chronology
The Beat (1979)	The Kids Are the Same (1982)	To Beat or Not to Beat (1983)

The Kids Are the Same is the second album by the American band Paul Collins' Beat (formerly the Beat), released in 1982. "On the Highway" was released as a single. The band supported the album with a North American tour. The Kids Are the Same sold around 30,000 copies, leading Columbia Records to drop the band.

== Production ==
The album was produced by Bruce Botnick, following aborted sessions with another producer. The band added Dennis Conway on drums, replacing Michael Ruiz. Most of the songs were written by frontman Paul Collins.

== Critical reception ==
Professional ratings
Review scores
Source	Rating
AllMusic	4/5 stars
The Clarion-Ledger	4/4 stars
Duluth News Tribune	9/10
The Encyclopedia of Popular Music	3/5 stars
MusicHound Rock: The Essential Album Guide	3/5 stars
Omaha World-Herald	3.5/5 stars
The Windsor Star	B+

The Globe and Mail said that "the band dabbles in so many different styles that no one of them could be called its own ... the playing and singing are hardly exceptional". The Blade-Tribune called the album "a masterpiece of basic rock". The Duluth News Tribune concluded that Collins "is one of those rare rockers who understands the form intuitively—these songs come from a place where rock exists in its natural state." The Clarion-Ledger noted that the band "is superb, especially lead guitarist Larry Whitman, who fits in rather than overwhelms." The Windsor Star labeled the songs "ravers all and sock-hoppable." The Intelligencer Journal listed The Kids Are the Same among the 20 best albums of 1982; the Fort Worth Star-Telegram placed it at No. 10.

In 2012, The Mercury stated that the band's first two albums "are still hailed as templates for how power-pop records should be made." AllMusic said that the title track "is a classic teen anthem waiting to be rediscovered." Trouser Press opined that "the band shows a high degree of musical volatility" on the first half of the album.

== Track listing ==
No.	Title	Length
1.	"That's What Life Is All About"
2.	"Dreaming"
3.	"On the Highway"
4.	"Will You Listen"
5.	"Crying Won't Help"
6.	"The Kids Are the Same"
7.	"Trapped"
8.	"It's Just a Matter of Time"
9.	"Met Her Yesterday"
10.	"I Will Say No"
