= Until Now =

Until Now may refer to:

- Until Now (Ingram Hill album), a 2002 album by Ingram Hill
- Until Now (Swedish House Mafia album), a 2012 album by Swedish House Mafia
