= The Man with the Blue Post-Modern Fragmented Neo-Traditionalist Guitar =

Studio album by Peter Case
- Released: April 11, 1989
- Studio: Ocean Way Recording, Sunset Sound and Sunset Sound Factory
- Genre: Alternative rock, alternative country, folk rock
- Label: Geffen
- Producer: Larry Hirsch, Steven Soles, Peter Case

Peter Case chronology
Peter Case (1986)	The Man with the Blue Post-Modern Fragmented Neo-Traditionalist Guitar (1989)	Six-Pack of Love (1992)

The Man with the Blue Post-Modern Fragmented Neo-Traditionalist Guitar (often called simply Blue Guitar) is an album by American singer-songwriter Peter Case, released in 1989. Its title is a reference to the Wallace Stevens poem "The Man With the Blue Guitar."

Guests include Los Lobos, T-Bone Burnett, Ry Cooder, Jim Keltner and David Lindley.

== Critical reception ==
Professional ratings
Review scores
Source	Rating
AllMusic	4.5/5 stars
The Rolling Stone Album Guide	4/5 stars

Writing for AllMusic, critic Brian Beatty stated: "Exceptional songs and musical guests, including Ry Cooder and members of Los Lobos and Tom Petty's Heartbreakers, make this... a worthwhile purchase..."

== Track listing ==
All songs by Peter Case unless otherwise noted.

1. "Charlie James" (Public Domain) – 3:07
2. "Put Down the Gun" – 3:41
3. "Entella Hotel" – 4:59
4. "Travellin' Light" (Case, Bob Neuwirth) – 4:11
5. "Poor Old Tom" – 3:57
6. "Old Part of Town" – 4:10
7. "Rise and Shine" (Case, Victoria Williams) – 4:20
8. "Two Angels" – 4:33
9. "This Town's a Riot" – 4:18
10. "Hidden Love" – 3:08

== Personnel ==
- Peter Case – vocals, guitar, piano
- Stephen Bruton – mandolin
- T-Bone Burnett – background vocals
- Ry Cooder – slide guitar
- Dennis Farias – horn
- Mitchell Froom – organ, piano
- David Hidalgo – 6-string bass, accordion, guitar, bass, ukulele, violin
- Jim Keltner – drums, percussion
- David Kemper – drums
- David Lindley – bouzouki, violin
- David McKelvy – harmonica
- David Miner – bass
- Jerry Scheff – bass
- Jack Sherman – guitar
- Steven Soles – guitar, bass, maracas, guitar, percussion, background vocals
- Benmont Tench – organ
- Daniel Timms – keyboards, organ, piano, background vocals
- Nick Lane – horn
- Michael Bannister – cymbals, drums
- Jorge Bermudez – tambourine
- John Berry, Jr. – horn, maracas, background vocals

Production

- Larry Hirsch – producer, engineer, mixing
- Peter Case – producer
- Scott Woodman – engineer
- Joe Schiff – assistant engineer
- Eric Rudd – assistant engineer
- Stephen Marcussen – mastering
