= Flying Saucer Blues =

Studio album by Peter Case
- Released: April 18, 2000
- Recorded: November–December 1999
- Genre: Alternative rock, alternative country, folk rock
- Length: 46:03
- Label: Vanguard
- Producer: Andrew Williams

Peter Case chronology
Full Service No Waiting (1998)	Flying Saucer Blues (2000)	Thank You St. Jude (2001)

Flying Saucer Blues is the seventh album by the American singer-songwriter Peter Case, released in 2000.

== Critical reception ==
Professional ratings
Review scores
Source	Rating
Allmusic	4/5 stars
No Depression	(mixed)

Music critic Denise Sullivan of Allmusic praised the album, writing "Never one to rely on formula, Case mixes his brand of incisive folk-rock with some simpatico musical styles…" Writing for No Depression, Jim Musser was equivocal about the album, writing "Maybe the singer-songwriter’s willful escape from pop bought its own particular travails. More likely, Peter Case is just very capable instead of great. This is (again) a collection of well-crafted songs; all of the pieces (again) seem to be here. The playing and songs are top-drawer; the voice is simply…nice."

== Track listing ==
All songs written by Peter Case unless otherwise noted.

1. "Paradise etc" – 3:51
2. "Cool Drink O' Water" – 5:02
3. "Blue Distance" – 4:50
4. "Walking Home Late" – 3:55
5. "Coulda Shoulda Woulda" (Case, Kevin Bowe, Duane Jarvis) – 2:43
6. "Something Happens" – 2:47
7. "Two Heroes" (Case, LeRoy Marinell) – 6:13
8. "Lost in Your Eyes" – 3:55
9. "Black Dirt & Clay" – 4:25
10. "Cold Trail Blues" – 4:38
11. "This Could Be the One" – 3:44

== Personnel ==
- Peter Case – vocals, guitar, harmonica
- Sandy Chila – drums
- Don Heffington – percussion
- David Jackson – upright bass
- Greg Leisz – dobro, lap steel guitar, mandolin, pedal steel guitar
- Andrew Williams – banjo, glockenspiel, guitar, harmonium, harmony vocals, background vocals
- Gabe Witcher – fiddle
- Darrell Leonard – horn
- Joe Sublett – horn
- David Perales – violin

Production

- Andrew Williams – producer, engineer, mixing
- Michael Meltzer – engineer
- Jim Wirt – mixing
- Greg Allen – package design, photography
- Doug Erb – illustrations
