= The Plimsouls (album) =

Studio album by the Plimsouls
- Released: February 1981
- Studio: Wally Heider Recording, Hollywood, CA
- Genre: Power pop
- Length: 31:10
- Label: Planet
- Producer: Danny Holloway

The Plimsouls chronology
Zero Hour (EP) (1980)	The Plimsouls (1981)	Everywhere at Once (1983)

Singles from The Plimsouls
- 1. "Now" Released: 16 February 1981; 2. "Zero Hour" Released: 11 May 1981

Professional ratings
Review scores
Source	Rating
AllMusic	4.5/5 stars
Trouser Press	favourable

The Plimsouls is the debut studio album by American power pop band the Plimsouls, released in February 1981 by record label Planet. The album reached #153 on the Billboard albums chart.

== Critical reception ==
Trouser Press said of the album that it showcases "vibrant, hummable tunes" as well as the band's affection for 1960s soul through their use of a horn section and a Wilson Pickett cover. AllMusic wrote that Peter Case's "rough-edged songs and the band's noisy performances are almost unbearably exciting," stating that "this is a true power pop classic."

Record World said of the single "Now" that "ringing guitars and defiant vocals spell hit."

Record World said that the single "Zero Hour" is "brash, rhythmic and full of crisp guitar riffs."

== Track listing ==
1. "Lost Time" (Peter Case, Joey Alkes, Chris Fradkin) – 3:41
2. "Now" (Case, Alkes, Fradkin) – 2:57
3. "In This Town" (Case) – 2:36
4. "Zero Hour" (Case) – 2:30
5. "Women" (Stevie Wright, George Young) – 2:50
6. "Hush, Hush" (Case, Alkes, Fradkin) – 2:34
7. "I Want What You Got" (Case) – 3:25
8. "Nickels and Dimes" (Case) – 3:05
9. "I Want You Back" (Case) – 2:33
10. "Mini-Skirt Minnie" (Lindell Hill, George Jackson, Earl Cage Jr.) – 2:42
11. "Everyday Things" (Case) – 2:29

The Plimsouls...Plus bonus tracks (1992, Rhino)

12. "Memory" (Case) – 2:23
13. "Dizzy Miss Lizzie" (Larry Williams) – 3:01
14. "Great Big World" (Case) – 3:00
15. "Zero Hour" (original version) (Case) – 2:36
16. "Hypnotized" (Case, Alkes, Fradkin) – 2:57
17. "How Long Will It Take?" (Case) – 2:51
18. "I Can't Turn You Loose" (Otis Redding) – 3:22
19. "When You Find Out" (Case) – 2:27
20. "Hush, Hush" (live version) (Case, Alkes, Fradkin) – 3:03

Notes

- Track 12 is a 1980 studio outtake; previously available on the Plimsouls fan club cassette Gangrene Tambourines, 1984
- Tracks 13 and 20 are B-sides of the "Zero Hour" single, 1981
- Tracks 14–18 are from the Zero Hour EP, 1980
- Track 19 is the B-side of the "Now" single, 1981

== Personnel ==
Adapted from the album liner notes.

The Plimsouls

- Peter Case – vocals, guitar, keyboards
- Eddie Muñoz – lead guitar
- David Pahoa – bass, vocals
- Lou Ramirez – drums

Additional personnel

- Jackie Kelso – baritone saxophone (1, 10)
- Doug Richardson – tenor saxophone (1, 10)
- Herman Riley – tenor saxophone (1, 10)
- Harold Battiste – horn arrangements (1, 10)

Technical

- Danny Holloway – producer
- Richard Digby Smith – engineer
- Tchad Blake – assistant engineer
- Doug Sax – mastering
- Mike Reese – mastering
- Tommy Steele – design
- Bob Seidemann – photography
