= The Case Files =

Compilation album by Peter Case
- Released: May 10, 2011
- Genre: Alternative rock, alternative country, folk rock
- Length: 42:13
- Label: Alive

Peter Case chronology
Wig! (2010)	The Case Files (2011)	HWY 62 (2015)

The Case Files is a compilation album by American singer-songwriter Peter Case, released in 2011. It consists of unreleased songs, out-takes and demos from Case's solo career.

== Critical reception ==
Professional ratings
Review scores
Source	Rating
Allmusic	4/5 stars

Allmusic critic Mark Deming wrote "Considering the odds-and-ends nature of this album, it's a pleasant surprise that The Case Files is so consistently strong ... The Case Files proves this man's cast-offs make for a better album than most acts' level-best efforts".

== Track listing ==
All songs written by Peter Case unless otherwise noted.

1. "(Give Me) One More Mile" – 3:00
2. "Let's Turn This Thing Around" – 3:13
3. "Anything (Closing Credits)" – 4:08
4. "The End" (Al Escovedo) – 3:16
5. "Good Times, Bad Times" (Mick Jagger, Keith Richards) – 3:17
6. "Milkcow Blues" (Traditional) – 4:39
7. "Kokomo Prayer Vigil" – 3:13
8. "Ballad of the Minimum Wage" – 3:11
9. "Steel Strings No. 1" – 3:40
10. "Trusted Friend" – 2:57
11. "Black Crow Blues" (Bob Dylan) – 3:34
12. "Round Trip Stranger Blues" – 4:05

== Personnel ==
- Peter Case – vocals, guitar, banjo, piano, Wurlitzer
- Mel Bransfield-Waters – bass
- Stephen Bruton – slide guitar
- T-Bone Burnett – guitar, percussion
- David Jackson – bass
- Duke McVinnie – bass
- Dave Meshell – bass
- Duane Jarvis – guitar
- Andrew Bush – drums
- Sandy Chila – drums
- David Ensminger – drums
- Mr. Bannister – drums
- Bryan Head – drums
- Ron Franklin – harp
- Stan Ridgway – keyboards

Production notes

- Doug Olson – engineer, mixing
- Stan Ridgway – engineer
- Joshua Case – engineer
- Pete Lyman – mastering
- Geoff Crowe – layout
- Anthony Artiagan – cover photo
