= Beeline (album) =

Studio album by Peter Case
- Released: September 10, 2002
- Recorded: April 2002
- Genre: Alternative rock, alternative country, folk rock
- Label: Vanguard
- Producer: Andrew Williams, Peter Case

Peter Case chronology
Thank You St. Jude (2001)	Beeline (2002)	Who's Gonna Go Your Crooked Mile? (2004)

Beeline is an album by American singer-songwriter Peter Case, released in 2002.

== Critical reception ==
Professional ratings
Review scores
Source	Rating
Allmusic	2/5 stars
No Depression	mixed

Writing for Allmusic, music critic Robert L. Doerschuk wrote "The low-budget production suggests that at least one of the goals here is to maintain Case's credibility as an off-center artist. In the end, though, this only contributes to a derivative quality… there's little to distinguish Bee Line from more insightful, wry, and far brighter highlights in the Case catalog." Writing for No Depression, David Menconi wrote of the album "In many ways, Beeline represents Case’s niftiest balancing act to date, adding touches of psychedelic ragtime and exotic raga drones to his steady rolling country blues… Beeline is anything but a downer, although the stoicism is more implied than spelled out."

== Track listing ==
All songs written by Peter Case unless otherwise noted.

1. "If You Got a Light to Shine" – 6:08
2. "Evening Raga" – 4:39
3. "I Hear Your Voice" – 5:05
4. "Lost in the Sky" – 5:42
5. "Gone" – 3:49
6. "Something's Coming" – 5:58
7. "Ain't Leaving Your Love" – 3:18
8. "It's Cold Inside" – 3:52
9. "Mañana Champeen" – 5:04
10. "First Light" – 6:29
11. "Something's Coming Remix" (Rob Swift) – 2:59

== Personnel ==
- Peter Case – vocals, guitar, harmonica, piano
- Sandy Chila – drums
- David Meshell – bass
- Joshua Case – guitar
- Andrew Williams – harmonium

Production

- Andrew Williams – producer, engineer, mixing
- Peter Case – producer
- Travis Dickerson – engineer
- Gavin Lurssen – mastering
- Joshua Case – computer editing
- Greg Allen – package design, photography
