= June's Picture Show =

Studio album by Ingram Hill
- Released: February 14, 2004
- Recorded: 2004
- Genre: Pop rock
- Length: 41:39
- Label: Hollywood Records

Ingram Hill chronology
Until Now (2002)	June's Picture Show (2004)	Why the Wait (2006)

June's Picture Show is the second studio album by the pop-rock band Ingram Hill.

The song "Will I Ever Make It Home?" was featured in the film 13 Going on 30.

== Track listing ==
1. "Chicago"
2. "Never Be the Same"
3. "Slippin' Out"
4. "Almost Perfect"
5. "On My Way"
6. "The Captain"
7. "Will I Ever Make It Home"
8. "Waste It All on You"
9. "To Your Grave"
10. "What If I'm Right"
11. "Maybe It's Me"
12. "Hangin' Around Again"

== Personnel ==
- Justin Moore - Lead vocals, Rhythm guitar
- Matt Chambless - Drums
- Shea Sowell - Bass, backing vocals
- Phil Bogard - Lead Guitar
