= Wig! =

Studio album by Peter Case
- Released: June 29, 2010
- Recorded: December 8, 2009
- Genre: Alternative rock, alternative country, folk rock
- Length: 46:14
- Label: Yep Roc
- Producer: Peter Case

Peter Case chronology
Let Us Now Praise Sleepy John (2007)	Wig! (2010)	The Case Files (2011)

Wig! is an album by American singer-songwriter Peter Case, released in 2010.

== History ==
Case had suffered heart problems and had major heart surgery in 2009. After his recovery, the album was made quickly and spontaneously. It is described as "the sweet spot where garage rock, punk, and the visceral wail of blues converge", diverging from Case's previous alternative folk and country blues.

== Critical reception ==
Professional ratings
Review scores
Source	Rating
Allmusic	4/5 stars

Writing for Allmusic, music critic Paul Carino wrote of the album "the off-the-cuff vibe creates a thrilling authenticity, hitting the sweet spot where garage rock, punk, and the visceral wail of blues converge." Bart Mendoza, writing for San Diego Troubadour, gave the album a positive review, calling it "a welcome addition to Cases’s canon and proof positive that his muse is just as strong as ever."

== Track listing ==
All tracks are written by Peter Case unless otherwise noted

No.	Title	Writer(s)	Length
1.	"Banks of the River"	Peter Case, Ron Franklin	5:08
2.	"Dig What You're Putting Down"		4:47
3.	"House Rent Jump"		3:18
4.	"New Old Blue Car"	Case, Marvin Etzioni, Victoria Williams	3:36
5.	"Look Out!"	Case, Franklin	3:30
6.	"Thirty Days in the Workhouse"	Huddie Ledbetter	2:48
7.	"Ain't Got No Dough"	Case, Franklin	3:50
8.	"My Kind of Trouble"		4:25
9.	"Somebody Told the Truth"		4:25
10.	"The Words in Red"		3:31
11.	"Colors of Night"		3:25
12.	"House Rent Party"		3:31

== Personnel ==
- Peter Case – vocals, guitar, harmonica, piano, bass
- Ron Franklin – guitar, piano, slide guitar
- Duane Jarvis – guitar, percussion
- D.J. Bonebrake – drums, percussion
- Bryan Head – drums, percussion
- Dave Meshell – bass

Production notes:

- Peter Case – producer
- Pete Lyman – engineer
- Gavin Lurssen – mastering
- Nathaniel Alford – mixing
- Andrew Bush – engineer, mixing
- Ron Franklin – engineer, mixing
- Denise Sullivan – cover photo, photography
- Frank Lee Drennen – photography
- Michael Triplett – package design
- Doug Erb – design
