= Six-Pack of Love =

Studio album by Peter Case
- Released: 1992
- Genre: Alternative rock, alternative country, folk rock
- Length: 42:45
- Label: Geffen
- Producer: Mitchell Froom; Peter Case

Peter Case chronology
The Man with the Blue Post-Modern Fragmented Neo-Traditionalist Guitar (1989)	Six-Pack of Love (1992)	Sings Like Hell (1993)

Six-Pack of Love is an album by American singer-songwriter Peter Case, released in 1992. The song "Dream About You" reached number 16 on the Modern Rock Tracks chart. It was Case's last album for Geffen Records.

== Critical reception ==
Professional ratings
Review scores
Source	Rating
AllMusic	2.5/5 stars
Chicago Tribune	3/4 stars

Music critic Denise Sullivan of AllMusic called the album "a failed attempt at expanding his folk roots and augmenting it with the tricky production of Mitchell Froom, Case's simple songs were lost in the morass." Trouser Press considered it "a gritty pop record on which [Case] plays a lot of piano, displays a John Lennon-ish voice and circles around the threat of romance as warily as an alley cat coming across a dead body."

== Track listing ==
1. "Vanishing Act" (Peter Case, Tonio K) – 3:33
2. "Deja Blues" (Case) – 3:47
3. "Dream About You" (Case, Andrew Williams) – 3:02
4. "When You Don't Come" (Case, Fontaine Brown) – 3:53
5. "Never Comin' Home" (Case) – 2:11
6. "It's All Mine" (Case, Tony Kenny) – 3:53
7. "Why Don't We Give It a Go?" (Case, Swan) – 2:13
8. "Why?" (Case, Tonio K.) – 3:39
9. "Last Time I Looked" (Case, Fred Koller, Diane Sherry) – 3:11
10. "Wonderful 99" (Case, John Prine) – 2:52
11. "I've Been Looking for You" (Case, Billy Swan) – 3:02
12. "Beyond the Blues" (Case, Bob Neuwirth, Tom Russell) – 3:57
13. "It Don't Matter What People Say" (Case, Koller) – 3:22

== Personnel ==
- Peter Case – vocals, guitar, piano
- Gary Mallaber – drums, percussion
- Mitchell Froom – keyboards
- Bruce Thomas – bass
- Michael den Elzen – guitar
- Steven Soles – background vocals

Production

- Mitchell Froom – producer
- Peter Case – producer
- Tchad Blake – engineer
- John Paterno – assistant engineer
- Tom Nellen – assistant engineer
- Max Garcia – assistant engineer
- Bob Ludwig – mastering
- Denise Keeley – photography
- Kevin Reagan – art direction
- Janet Wolsborn – design
