= Cold in California =

Studio album by Ingram Hill
- Released: August 2007
- Recorded: 2007
- Genre: Pop rock
- Label: Hollywood Records

Ingram Hill chronology
Why the Wait (2006)	Cold in California (2007)	Look Your Best (2010)

Cold in California is the third studio album by the American pop-rock band Ingram Hill, released on August 21, 2007.

== Track listing ==
1. "I Hear Goodnight" 3:26 (Ingram Hill / Mike Daly)
2. "Four Letter Word" 3:17 (Ingram Hill)
3. "What You Want" 3:40 (Adam Watts / Andy Dodd / Ingram Hill)
4. "Million Miles Away" 3:21 (Chris Fradkin / Joey Alkes / Peter Case)
5. "She Wants to Be Alone" 3:18 (Adam Watts / Andy Dodd / Ingram Hill)
6. "Why Don't You" 3:23 (Adam Watts / Andy Dodd / Ingram Hill)
7. "Something to Cry To" 3:23 (Ingram Hill / Mike Daly)
8. "Impossible" 3:19 (Ingram Hill)
9. "Finish What We Started" 3:26 (Danielle Brisebois / Ingram Hill / Oliver Leiber / Steve Robson)
10. "Troubled Mercy" 3:07 (Adam Watts / Andy Dodd / Ingram Hill)
11. "Cold in California" 3:43 (Ingram Hill / Joe Firstman)

== Personnel ==
- Justin Moore – lead vocals, rhythm guitar
- Matt Chambless – drums
- Shea Sowell – bass, backing vocals
- Phil Bogard – lead guitar
- Robert Hadley – mastering engineer
