= Sings Like Hell =

Studio album by Peter Case
- Released: 1993
- Studios: Big Mono, Atwater, California
- Genres: Alternative rock, alternative country, folk rock
- Length: 42:03
- Label: Vanguard
- Producer: Marvin Etzioni

Peter Case chronology
Six-Pack of Love (1992)	Sings Like Hell (1993)	Torn Again (1995)

Sings Like Hell is an album by American singer-songwriter Peter Case, released in 1993. In 1996 the album title gave rise to a monthly music series, Sings Like Hell (Music Series), staged at the Lobero Theater in Santa Barbara, California.

== History ==
The album was Case's first album on the Vanguard Records label after previously recording for the Geffen label. He had originally recorded and released the album on his own label before Vanguard took notice and re-issued it. Included are traditional songs and some of Case's own personal favorites. Case suffered from depression after being released by Geffen, but was pleased with Vanguard. "Vanguard takes on artists they believe in and lets them do what they need to do," says Case. "That’s what they did in the ’60s — that’s what they’re famous for — and they’re living up to that legacy. That’s so alien to the big-time record industry, in my experience."

== Critical reception ==
Professional ratings
Review scores
Source	Rating
Allmusic	4/5 stars

Music critic Denise Sullivan of Allmusic called the album "The perfect introduction to traditional American music for rock fans; folk and blues fans will also appreciate the richness in Case's delivery. His reading of "Lakes of Pontchartrain" is one for the books."

== Track listing ==
1. "Broke Down Engine" (Traditional, Johnny Winter) – 3:09
2. "Roving Gambler" (Traditional) – 3:41
3. "So Glad You're Mine" (Arthur Crudup) – 2:54
4. "Lakes of Ponchartrain" (Traditional) – 5:17
5. "Walkin' Bum" (Hank Mills) – 4:21
6. "How 'Bout You" (Jesse Winchester) – 3:14
7. "Match Box Blues" (Blind Lemon Jefferson, Albert King) – 2:56
8. "Rose Conolly" (Traditional) – 2:20
9. "Down in the Alley" (Traditional, Minnie McCoy) – 2:48
10. "Waltz of the Angels" (Dick Reynolds, Jack Rhodes) – 2:40
11. "Well Runs Dry" (Traditional) – 3:33
12. "North Coast Blues" (Peter Case) – 2:55
13. "Down the Line" (John Mayall, Roy Orbison, Sam Phillips) – 2:15

== Personnel ==
- Peter Case – vocals, guitar, harmonica, piano
- Michael Bannister – drums
- Don Heffington – drums
- Tammy Rogers – violin
- Tony Marsico – bass
- Marvin Etzioni – mandolin

Production

- Marvin Etzioni – producer
- David Vaught – engineer
- Jeff Zaraya – mastering
