= The Beat (American band) =

American power pop band

- Also known as: Paul Collins' Beat; Paul Collins & The Beat
- Origin: Los Angeles
- Genres: Power pop, new wave
- Years active: 1977–1989; 1994–present
- Labels: Columbia; MVS; Caroline; Sony Music; WMG; Get Hip; Bomp!; Wagon Wheel; Alive
- Members: Paul Collins; Juancho Bummer; Timm Buechler; Sammy Mead; Tim Schweiger; Chris Bongers
- Past members: Steven Huff; Mike Ruiz; Larry Whitman; Dennis Conway; Howard Parr; Jay Dee Daugherty; Jimmy Rip; Juancho Lopez; Octavio Vinck; Amos Pitsch; Justin Perkins; Patrick Collins; Pablo Cabanes Añó; Paul Bultitude; Jon Phillip
- Website: thepaulcollinsbeat.com

The Beat (soon renamed to Paul Collins' Beat) is an American rock and power pop band from Los Angeles that formed in 1979. Paul Collins' Beat resurfaced in the 1990s and continues to tour and record new material. Front man Paul Collins has released several projects with his alternative country group The Paul Collins Band, who play Americana music inspired by country rock and folk rock.

== Early development ==
The roots of The Beat lie in The Nerves, a seminal power pop combo featuring Paul Collins (born 1956, New York City), Peter Case (the future front man of The Plimsouls), and Jack Lee. Collins played drums; all three members composed and sang. Collins contributed several songs to the band including "Walking Out On Love," "Let Me Into Your Life" and one song, "Working Too Hard", to the group's only release, a 1976 self-titled four-song EP distributed by independent Bomp! Records. The Nerves are most famous for Lee's "Hanging on the Telephone" later popularized by Blondie on their breakthrough album Parallel Lines. After The Nerves' demise Collins and Case formed The Breakaways which went through several guitarists until Case and Collins both moved to guitar and recruited Mike Ruiz (drums - Milk 'N' Cookies) and Steven Huff (bass and backing vocals - The Apollo Stars). Case left the group after a few months of rehearsals to pursue a solo career which led to the eventual formation of The Plimsouls. Collins, Huff and Ruiz officially became "The Beat", when pressed for a group name prior to an interview to promote the release of The Breakaways recording of "Walking Out On Love" (credited as Paul Collins), on Bomp's Waves Vol. 1.

== Transition years ==
The Los Angeles power pop scene was beginning to garner national attention and with the help of Collins' friend from The Nerves days in San Francisco, Eddie Money and his record producer Bruce Botnick, Collins was able to ink a deal with Columbia/CBS and Bill Graham Management. CBS released their self-titled debut in October 1979. All 12 songs were Collins originals; Peter Case, Steven Huff and Eddie Money had one co-writing credit each, all on different songs. Continuing in The Nerves' vein, the album consisted of harmony-laden, driving guitar pop songs, including a re-recorded version of "Working Too Hard". The album was critically acclaimed and is today remembered as a classic of the power pop genre (see this 4.5-star review in AllMusic). The group appeared on Dick Clark's American Bandstand, (March 8, 1980), The Merv Griffin Show and that same year contributed a song to the soundtrack LP of the popular comedy movie Caddyshack. Despite promotion, respectable airplay on commercial and College radio, diligent touring alongside such popular artists as Ian Gomm, The Jam and a tour of Europe, The Beat found little commercial success.

The band's second Columbia LP, The Kids Are the Same was released in 1982, with drummer Ruiz now replaced by Dennis Conway, who played for both Elton John and Alice Cooper. The group was now billed worldwide as "Paul Collins' Beat".

The British ska group of the same name were first to establish themselves as "The Beat" in Europe, prompting a voluntary decision for the U.S. group to be billed as "Paul Collins' Beat" in Europe. In the U.S., Collins' "The Beat" was first to release an album in turn forcing the British group to use the name "The English Beat" in the U.S., albeit only after the British group was threatened with a lawsuit by Columbia, Collins' record label.

Not as critically successful as its predecessor, The Kids Are The Same was also a commercial flop. A two-year lag between releases, a name change and this "sophomore slump" resulted in the group being dropped from CBS-Columbia. Undaunted, the group self-financed the production of three videos featuring songs from the LP now abandoned by their former label. One of these videos "On The Highway", which had been modestly promoted to AOR radio by CBS, was put on medium rotation for several months on the then fledgling MTV network.

With an overhauled New York City line-up (Conway and Whitman were replaced by Patti Smith drummer Jay Dee Daugherty and Television/Tom Verlaine guitarist Jimmy Rip), the group reclaimed the name "The Beat" and released the five song 12-inch mini-album To Beat or Not To Beat in 1983, on the independent Jem/Passport label in the U.S.. One song from the album, "Dance, Dance", was made into a music video in 1984 and received limited exposure on MTV. To Beat or Not To Beat, with an additional song, was released in Europe where the group relocated (and would remain for the next several years) to promote the release and tour, this time featuring Paul's brother Patrick Collins on guitar and Fabian Jolivet on drums during that year of extensive touring and television appearances.

In 1985, another six song 12-inch mini-album Longtime Gone was produced by former Motörhead drummer Lucas Fox and recorded in London with British musicians, including Jim Barber on guitar (The Rolling Stones & Mick Jagger solo album), being released only in Europe. A live album recorded in Madrid, Spain with Spanish members (featuring Manolo Iglesias on drums) titled Live At The Universal followed in 1986. Collins relocated to San Francisco, releasing the album One Night, with yet another incarnation of an all American Beat, this time credited as "Paul Collins + The Beat", through Sony in 1989 (again only in Europe). One Night was their first album to feature acoustic instruments such as mandolin and acoustic guitar. This was their final studio album before disbanding. Collins would go on to record several solo albums before later re-forming a new version of The Beat.

== Later years ==
Collins embarked on a solo career in the 1990s, releasing "Paul Collins" in 1992, featuring numerous guest appearances by S.F. Bay Area notables. Collins then returned to his "hometown" of New York City. Focusing his songwriting on Country, Folk and Americana he formed "The Paul Collins Band" which produced the 1993 release "From Town To Town". Collins continues to tour, while retaining a cult following; he is particularly popular in Spain. The Paul Collins' Beat music videos "On The Highway" and "Dance, Dance" are occasionally aired on the VH1 Classic and MTV2 television networks.

In 2006, Collins resurrected "Paul Collins' Beat" with the help of bassist Juancho Bummer and a slightly younger Spanish lineup and recorded a live album entitled Live In Europe, released as a free MP3 CD album download on their official website followed by a CD of all new original material, "Flying High", recorded in Madrid, Spain. That was followed in March 2008 with Ribbon Of Gold. This album contains several songs the band performs live in concert, including Falling In Love With Her, I Still Want You, Big Pop Song and She Doesn't Want To Hang Around With You. Paul Collins' Beat latest release is a split 7-inch with the Italian powerpop band Radio Days, released by the Italian label Surfin Ki Records. In 2009, Bill Graham catalog released Live at Berkely Theatre with Eddie Money through Wolfgang's Vault.

Collins continues to tour and record new material.

== Comeback albums ==
In 2010, Collins Paul Collins' Beat signed a record deal with Alive Naturalsound and recorded an album of new material with Jim Diamond at his Ghetto Recorders studio in Detroit, Michigan. Diamond is a respected Record producer, who is best known for his work with The White Stripes. The studio was chosen because it relies on vintage recording and Diamond is said to use a 2" 24-track tape machine among other mixing boards and various pieces of equipment. The album was entitled "King Of Powerpop," which included artwork by famed artist Bill Stout in addition to a guest performance by Wally Palmar, vocalist and harmonica player from The Romantics and Ringo Starr & His All-Starr Band. In 2014, Alive Records released Collins' second comeback album, entitled Feel The Noise. In support of the new album, Collins embarked on a world tour and released a music video for the single, "I Need My Rock N' Roll."

== Green Day Broadway musical ==
In 2011, the American punk rock band Green Day launched the American Idiot Broadway musical production. Each night included a live rendition of the song "Walking Out On Love," which was written by Paul Collins. The song was previously recorded by Collins' groups The Beat and The Breakaways. Green Day frontman Billie Joe Armstrong is an outspoken fan of the song, which may appear on a future studio album by Green Day. To celebrate the success of the musical, The Paul Collins Beat joined Green Day onstage for live performances in New York.

== Collins and Case reunion tribute to the Nerves ==
In 2012, longtime friends and musical partners, Paul Collins and Peter Case embarked on a reunion tour paying tribute to their respective bands The Nerves, The Breakaways, The Beat and The Plimsouls. The touring band lineup for the Collins and Case tour was augmented by members of The Paul Collins Beat (Timm Buechler, bass, and Amos Pitsch, drums), offering audiences with full-band electric showcases. The tour included a date in Austin, Texas, where actor Bill Murray made a surprise appearance at the concert to introduce the band to the audience. The Beat had previously appeared on the Caddyshack original motion picture soundtrack alongside Murray in 1979. According to the L.A. Times Music Blog of March 22, 2012, the tour "fell apart" early due to "musical differences". Collins' guitarist is Tim Schweiger, a veteran musician who also tours with Tommy Stinson of The Replacements.

== The Beat Army ==
During 2005, Collins launched a new music program and partner-based booking agency that was recently renamed as The Beat Army. Collins created a forum where fans, bands, clubs, radio stations, blogs and record stores can network. The interaction between Paul Collins' Beat and other bands has enabled him to cross-promote his new projects, book shows on several continents and establish a worldwide network of industry friends, fans, musicians and artists from the genres of rock, punk rock, power pop, new wave, alternative rock, ska, garage rock, hardcore punk, classic rock and roll, skate punk, emo, melodic hardcore, Grindcore, crust punk, grunge, skacore, heavy metal, thrash metal, crossover thrash, metalcore, rapcore, post-hardcore and speed metal.

The business model for The Beat Army is a simple process in which a band or artist agrees to book a club or festival gig for both themselves and Paul Collins' Beat, who agree to perform the show as a headlining act. Once Collins and his management approve the contract, the band serves as a booking agent and the venue is chosen based upon its style of music and the type of people it attracts. After the performance, Collins divides the proceeds evenly between his band, himself and the members of the opening act.

With Collins' solo albums heavily rooted in the genres of alt-country, Americana, folk and country music, he continues to maintain a diversified fanbase. The Beat Army has enabled Collins to book shows with country bands, singer-songwriters, folk artists, and rockabilly bands.

== The Paul Collins' Beat tour with The English Beat ==
In Fall 2012, The Paul Collins Beat joined a package tour "The Two Beats Hearting As One Tour," co-headlining with Two-tone Ska group The Beat. The English Beat and The Paul Collins Beat were both part of the "new wave" of bands to emerge from the late 1970s and early 1980s. The styles of music they play are very different. The tour package included dates at large music halls, casinos, auditoriums and clubs. According to a September 2012 interview with Collins, "Contrary to what the internet fabricates, there never was and is no animosity toward The English Beat. I am still a big fan of The English Beat. Ska is really cool music. Dave is a good friend. He's always so nice and always upbeat. He's just as supportive of my music as I am of his. Both of our fanbases are enjoying hearing each other's music." According to an October 2012 press release, Dave Wakeling stated, “Paul and I originally met back in '83 and have been in touch occasionally over the years, but recently we've been in closer Facebook contact, which led to this idea becoming a reality....Two beats, hearting as one!”

== China tour ==
In Spring 2014, The Paul Collins Beat embarked on a groundbreaking tour of China, performing full-band electric concerts in nine cities, in addition to in-store performances at record shops and televised news programs. Supporting the Paul Collins Beat were Shanghai based punk group Round Eye who also organized the tour of the mainland.

Neither Collins nor his earlier groups The Nerves, The Breakaways or The Beat had previously performed in China, although each project retains a sizeable following due to the resurgence of vinyl LP records and recent worldwide reissues. The tour provided The Paul Collins Beat the opportunity to perform in large cities, small working class towns and student centers based around Chinese colleges. Collins also performed a special acoustic concert at Shanghai Experimental School, which attracted the attention of Chinese media outlets and was aired on television.

== Other information ==
Original Beat lead guitarist Larry Whitman (September 27, 1955 – July 26, 1997), a devoted fan of Phil Spector, died from a self-inflicted gunshot wound. Before joining The Beat, Whitman was producer, songwriter and member of L.A. pop group Needles & Pins, whose only release was the Spector influenced 45 RPM single "Don't You Worry". A poster of The Beat's self-titled first album can be seen in the opening credits of some episodes of WKRP In Cincinnati.

Portions of the album The Kids Are the Same were recorded in 1980 at Twentieth Century Fox Music Scoring Stage during a Musician's Union strike against the motion-picture and television industries. Although The Beat's song "There She Goes" is included on the soundtrack album of the film, Caddyshack, and listed in the closing credits, it was not used in the final cut of the film.

== Discography ==
=== Albums ===
as The Beat

- The Beat (1979, Columbia Records)
- To Beat or Not to Beat (EP, 1983, Passport Records)

as Paul Collins' Beat

- The Kids Are the Same (1982, Columbia Records)
- Long Time Gone (1985, Closer, Record Runner)
- Live at the Universal (1986, Twins)
- One Night (1989, Closer)
- Flying High (2004, Rock Indiana)
- Ribbon of Gold (2008, Rock Indiana)

Paul Collins solo

- Paul Collins (1992)
- Feel the Noise LP CD © Alive Records
- King of Power Pop! Paul Collins solo LP CD © Alive Records
- From Town to Town LP, CD © 1999 Caroline Records/Wagon Wheel Records
- Live in Spain © 1999 Wagon Wheel Records, Phono Music
- Let's Go (Paul Collins with the Yum Yums) © 1999 Pop the Balloon
- Live in Europe: The Concert Free Web Download CD © 2008 Wagon Wheel Records
- Live at Berkely Theatre with Eddie Money CD © 2009 Bill Graham Catalog on Wolfgang's Vault

Other

- The Beat or Not the Beat: A Tribute to Paul Collins Tribute Compilation (1994, Pop Attack)
