= Who's Gonna Go Your Crooked Mile? =

Compilation album by Peter Case
- Released: September 14, 2004
- Genre: Alternative rock, alternative country, folk rock
- Label: Vanguard
- Producer: Peter Case, Joshua Case, Seven Soles, Andrew Williams, Larry Hirsch

Peter Case chronology
Beeline (2002)	Who's Gonna Go Your Crooked Mile? (2004)	Let Us Now Praise Sleepy John (2007)

Who's Gonna Go Your Crooked Mile? is a compilation album by American singer-songwriter Peter Case, released in 2004. It includes three previously unreleased songs.

== Critical reception ==
Professional ratings
Review scores
Source	Rating
Allmusic	4/5 stars
No Depression	(no rating)

Writing for Allmusic, music critic Mark Deming wrote "…if you want a potent reminder of just how good a songwriter Case is, and how well he can make his material work in the studio, this album offers the evidence in spades." Russell Hall of No Depression magazine reviewed the album and wrote "Case rarely comes off as strident; few singers are better than he at conveying a yearning, scruffy romanticism. Moreover, songs such as the rockabilly throwaway “Coulda Shoulda Woulda" show that sometimes Case is concerned with nothing more than having a good time."

== Track listing ==
All songs written by Peter Case unless otherwise noted.

1. "Wake Up Call" – 3:28
2. "My Generation's Golden Handcuff Blues" – 4:12
3. "Crooked Mile" – 4:14
4. "Blind Luck" (Case, Fred Koller) – 4:16
5. "Spell of Wheels" (Case, Joshua Case) – 5:13
6. "On the Way Downtown" (Peter Case, Joshua Case) – 3:33
7. "Let Me Fall" – 4:14
8. "Two Heroes" (Case, LeRoy Marinell) – 6:11
9. "Blues Distance" – 4:48
10. "Coulda Shoulda Woulda" (Case, Kevin Bowe, Duane Jarvis) – 2:41
11. "Cold Trail Blues" – 4:36
12. "If You've Got a Light to Shine" – 4:03
13. "Something's Coming" – 5:43
14. "I Hear Your Voice" – 5:01
15. "First Light" – 4:56
16. "Gone" – 3:47

== Personnel ==
- Peter Case – vocals, guitar, harmonica, piano
- Sandy Chila – drums
- Lili Haydn – violin
- Gabe Witcher – violin
- Brad Rice – bass
- Eric Rigler – uilleann pipes
- Jerry Scheff – bass
- Willie Aron – electric piano
- Joshua Case – guitar, Wurlitzer
- Bryan Head – drums, glockenspiel
- Don Heffington – bodhran, drums, footsteps, jaw harp, percussion
- David P. Jackson – bass
- Warren Klein – tamboura
- Greg Leisz – guitar, Llap steel guitar, pedal steel guitar
- David Meshell – bass
- Darrell Leonard – horn
- Joe Sublett – horn
- Steven Soles – harmony, background vocals
- Billy Swan – harmony, background vocals
- Jeff Big Dad Turmes – clarinet, saxophone
- Andrew Williams – harmonium, harmony vocals, background vocals, guitar

Production

- Andrew Williams – producer, engineer, mixing
- Peter Case – producer, engineer
- Joshua Case – producer, mixing, computer editing
- J. Steven Soles – producer
- Larry Hirsch – producer
- Gavin Lurssen – compilation mastering
- Geoff Pearlman – engineer
- Greg Allen – package design, photography
