= Full Service No Waiting =

Album by Peter Case

Studio album by Peter Case
- Released: February 17, 1998
- Genre: Alternative rock, alternative country, folk rock
- Label: Vanguard
- Producer: Andrew Williams

Peter Case chronology
Torn Again (1995)	Full Service No Waiting (1998)	Flying Saucer Blues (2000)

Full Service No Waiting is the sixth album by the American singer-songwriter Peter Case, released in 1998.

== History ==
Full Service No Waiting was recorded quickly and on a tight budget. Case commented in an interview for No Depression: "Maybe our limitations worked for us on this one. “It was the freedom of the shoestring that allowed us to go with early takes, and work in a real energetic way. The whole process of going in and making a record can be kind of overwhelming. Even when you’ve done it a lot, it can clamp down on the spontaneity of the music. This time we really made a point of catching things when they were really fresh, and really alive — before they’d gotten run into the ground. So besides probably being my favorite record to work on, I think it was one of the quickest I’ve done."

Case rented a room in a nearby town to write the music for the album. Of the process of writing, he said, "I worked four hours every day, from 9 in the morning until 1 in the afternoon. The music poured out. But when I tried to do my next record, Flying Saucer Blues, like that, I couldn’t. My system rebelled from that approach. I have to trick myself. I don’t like to hit things head-on. I get the willies."

== Critical reception ==
Professional ratings
Review scores
Source	Rating
Allmusic	4/5 stars
Entertainment Weekly	B+

Music critic Denise Sullivan of Allmusic praised the album and questioned "With such a strong debut, follow-up and mid-career resurrection, the question still remains: when will Case achieve the recognition he deserves as one of his generation's finest songwriters?" In an article on Case for No Depression, Bob Townsend wrote of the record; "As he's done for more than a decade, Case delivers this latest bunch of songs through a timeless combination of melodic verve and closely observed lyricism. But it's his mature struggle with the restless ghosts of his past that makes the new disc so resounding." New York Magazine called the album "stunning" and that Case "makes the leap from romantic admirer of folk traditions to authentic practitioner."

== Track listing ==
All songs written by Peter Case unless otherwise noted.

1. "Spell of Wheels" (Peter Case, Joshua Case) – 5:17
2. "On the Way Downtown" (Peter Case, Joshua Case) – 3:36
3. "Let Me Fall" – 4:17
4. "Green Blanket (Part 1)" – 3:35
5. "Honey Child" – 4:41
6. "See Through Eyes" (Peter Case, Diane Sherry Case) – 4:04
7. "Until the Next Time" – 4:18
8. "Crooked Mile" – 4:03
9. "Beautiful Grind" – 4:07
10. "Drunkard's Harmony" – 6:58
11. "Still Playin" – 5:00

== Personnel ==
- Peter Case – guitar, vocals, harmonica
- Sandy Chila – drums
- Andrew Williams – harmonium, background vocal, guitar, mellotron
- Greg Leisz – lap steel, pedal steel, dobro, guitar
- David Jackson – upright bass, accordion
- Lili Haydn – violin
- Don Heffington – percussion, jaw harp, bodhran
- Eric W. Rigler – uilleann pipes
