= Ingram Hill =

American rock band

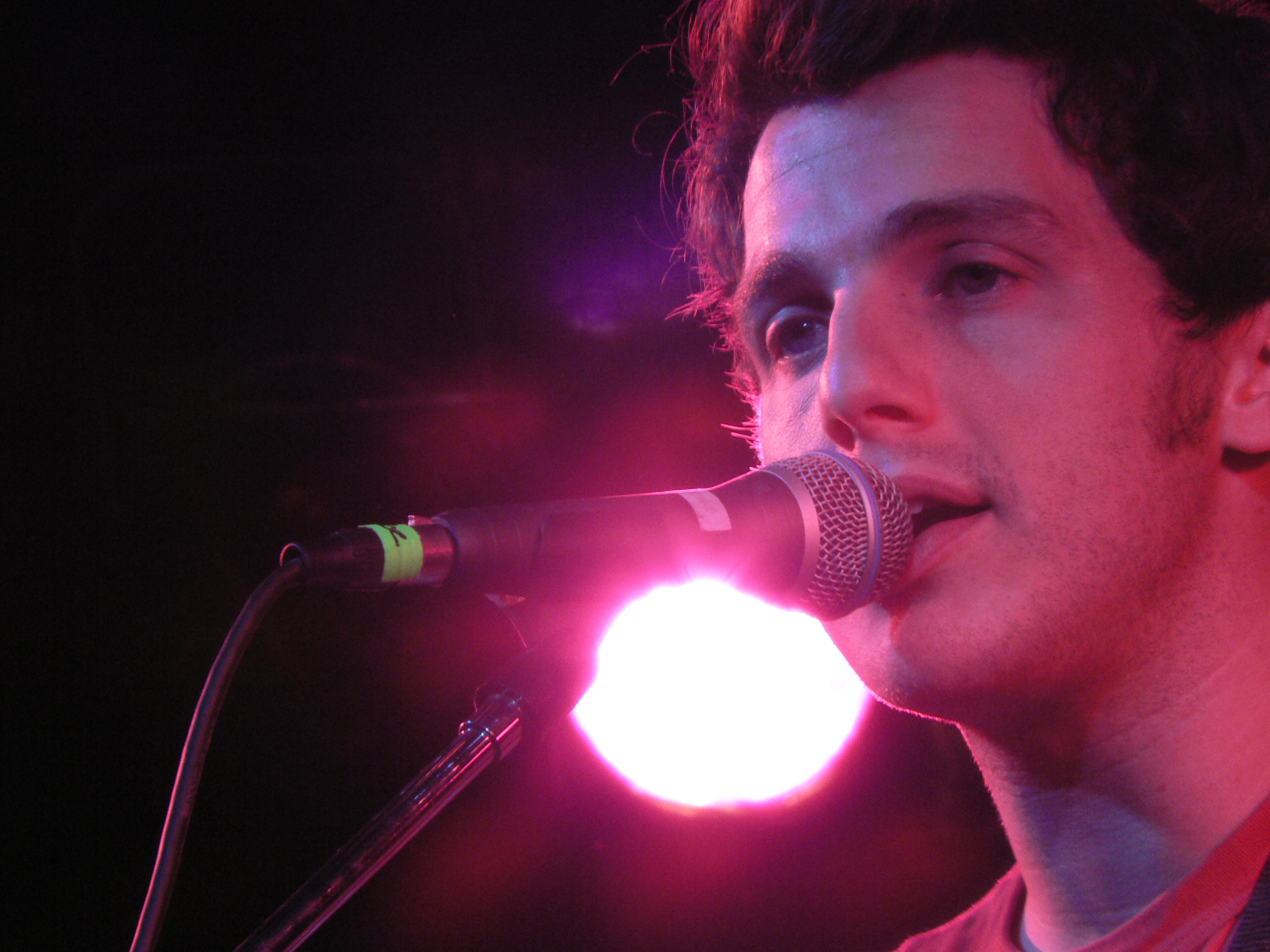
- Lead singer Justin Moore in 2007

Background information
- Origin: Memphis, Tennessee, U.S.
- Genres: Alternative rock; pop rock
- Years active: 2000–present
- Labels: Hollywood; Traveler Records; Rock Ridge
- Members: Justin Moore; Phil Bogard; Zach Kirk
- Past members: Matt Chambless; Shea Sowell
- Website: ingramhillmusic.com

Ingram Hill is an American rock band from Memphis, Tennessee. As of 2026, they have released five studio albums and two EPs.

== History ==
Ingram Hill was formed in 2000 by Justin Moore (lead vocals, rhythm guitar), Phil Bogard (lead guitar), Shea Sowell (bass), and Matt Chambless (drums).

In 2002, they released the EP Until Now on the independent label Traveler Records. The lead singer of Tonic, Emerson Hart, produced four of the eight tracks.

The band's first full-length album, June's Picture Show, which came out in 2004, was produced by Rick Beato. A year later, they released a cover of Boston's "More Than a Feeling" on the soundtrack to the sports comedy film Herbie: Fully Loaded. Also in 2005, they contributed a cover of "'39" for the Queen tribute album Killer Queen.

Ingram Hill have since issued the EP Why the Wait (2006) and the full-length albums Cold in California (2007), Look Your Best (2010), Blue Room Afternoon (2011), and Ingram Hill (2012).

== Band members ==
Current

- Justin Moore – vocals, guitar
- Phil Bogard – guitar
- Zach Kirk – bass, vocals

Past

- Matt Chambless – drums
- Shea Sowell – bass

== Discography ==
=== Studio albums ===
Title	Details	Peak chart positions	
Title	Details	US Heat	US Country
June's Picture Show	Release date: February 10, 2004; Label: Hollywood Records	—	—
Cold in California	Release date: August 21, 2007; Label: Hollywood Records	24	—
Look Your Best	Release date: September 28, 2010; Label: Rock Ridge Music	12	—
Blue Room Afternoon	Release date: June 21, 2011; Label: Rock Ridge Music	—	—
Ingram Hill	Release date: August 28, 2012; Label: Rock Ridge Music	29	54
"—" denotes releases that did not chart

=== EPs ===
Title	Details
Until Now	Release date: March 12, 2002; Label: Traveler Records
Why the Wait	Release date: October 31, 2006; Label: Hollywood Records

=== Singles ===
Year	Single	Peak positions	Album
Year	Single	Adult Top 40	Album
2004	"Will I Ever Make It Home"	22	June's Picture Show
2005	"Almost Perfect"	25	June's Picture Show
