= Torn Again =

Studio album by Peter Case
- Released: August 25, 1995
- Genre: Alternative rock, alternative country, folk rock
- Length: 47:56
- Label: Vanguard
- Producer: Larry Hirsch, Steven Soles

Peter Case chronology
Sings Like Hell (1993)	Torn Again (1995)	Full Service No Waiting (1998)

Torn Again is an album by American singer-songwriter Peter Case, released in 1995.

== Critical reception ==
Professional ratings
Review scores
Source	Rating
Allmusic	4.5/5 stars
Entertainment Weekly	A+

Music critic Denise Sullivan of Allmusic called the album a return to form, calling it "More heartfelt and less hardened, Case sings for the grown-ups."

== Track listing ==
All songs by Peter Case unless otherwise noted.

1. "Turnin' Blue" – 4:28
2. "Baltimore" – 4:30
3. "Workin' for the Enemy" – 4:20
4. "Breaking the Chain" (Case, Fontaine Brown) – 3:25
5. "Anything" (Case, Mark Hart) – 4:15
6. "Blind Luck" (Case, Fred Koller) – 4:16
7. "Little Wind (Could Blow Me Away)" (Case, Tom Russell) – 3:56
8. "Punch & Socko" – 2:43
9. "Wilderness" – 4:48
10. "Takin' It" – 3:50
11. "Airplane" – 4:22
12. "Moves Me Deeply" (Case, Billy Swan) – 3:03

== Personnel ==
- Peter Case – vocals, guitar, harmonica
- Don Heffington – drums
- Larry Hirsch – percussion
- Greg Leisz – dobro, mandolin, guitar, steel guitar
- Jerry Scheff – bass
- Steven Soles – drums, guitar, percussion, background vocals
- Billy Swan – background vocals
