= Why the Wait =

EP by Ingram Hill
- Released: October 31, 2006
- Recorded: 2006
- Genre: Pop rock
- Length: 20:41
- Label: Hollywood Records
- Producer: -

Ingram Hill chronology
June's Picture Show (2004)	Why the Wait (2006)	Cold in California (2007)

Why the Wait is an EP by the American pop-rock band Ingram Hill, released on October 31, 2006.

== Track listing ==
1. "Firefly Ride"
2. "Love Is Just a Word"
3. "Why the Wait (demo)"
4. "Solsbury Hill"
5. "Call It My Way"

== Ingram Hill ==
- Justin Moore – lead vocals, rhythm guitar
- Matt Chambless – drums
- Shea Sowell – bass, backing vocals
- Phil Bogard – lead guitar
