= Until Now (Ingram Hill album) =

Studio album by Ingram Hill
- Released: 2002
- Genre: Pop rock

Ingram Hill chronology
Until Now (2002)	June's Picture Show (2004)

Until Now is the debut EP by American pop-rock band Ingram Hill, independently released in 2002.

== Track listing ==
1. "Will I Ever Make It Home"
2. "Almost Perfect"
3. "Brother's Keeper"
4. "The Day Your Luck Runs Out"
5. "The Timing"
6. "Chicago"
7. "Maybe It's Me"
8. "Your Smiling Face"

== Personnel ==
- Justin Moore – Lead vocals, rhythm guitar
- Matt Chambless – drums
- Shea Sowell – bass, backing vocals
- Phil Bogard – lead guitar
