= HWY 62 =

Studio album by Peter Case
- Released: October 30, 2015
- Genres: Alternative rock, alternative country, folk rock
- Length: 42:32
- Label: Omnivore
- Producers: Peter Case, Sheldon Gomberg

Peter Case chronology
The Case Files (2011)	HWY 62 (2015)	On the Way Downtown (2017)

HWY 62 is an album by American singer-songwriter Peter Case, released in 2015.

== Critical reception ==
Professional ratings
Review scores
Source	Rating
All About Jazz	4.5/5 stars
Allmusic	4/5 stars
American Songwriter	4/5 stars
PopMatters	8/10 stars
Rolling Stone	3.5/5 stars
The Telegraph	4/5 stars

Writing for Allmusic, music critic Mark Deming wrote of the album "HWY 62 finds Peter Case rockin' the blues a little bit and singing with serious heart, soul, and wisdom all the time, and nearly three decades into his solo career he remains one of our best and most compelling singer/songwriters, with this album as proof." Steve Horowitz of PopMatters commented, "At its core, HWY 62 declares allegiance to the victims of unfairness, inequality, and the wrong things that happen to people, and announces that Case is one of them. That he can touch us so strongly with these tales reveals Case’s considerable artistic talents."

== Track listing ==
All songs written by Peter Case unless otherwise noted.

1. "Pelican Bay" – 3:56
2. "Waiting on a Plane" – 4:24
3. "New Mexico" – 3:52
4. "Water From a Stone" – 4:29
5. "All Dressed Up (For Trial)" – 3:33
6. "If I Go Crazy" – 5:06
7. "The Long Good Time" – 4:09
8. "Evicted" – 3:58
9. "Long Time Gone" (Bob Dylan) – 4:30
10. "Bluebells" – 3:30
11. "HWY 62" – 1:05

== Personnel ==
- Peter Case – vocals, guitar, harmonica, piano
- D. J. Bonebrake – drums, percussion
- Ben Harper – guitar, slide guitar
- Don Heffington – drums (snare)
- Jebin Bruni – keyboards
- David Carpenter – bass
- Cindy Wasserman – harmony

Production notes:

- Peter Case – producer
- Sheldon Gomberg – producer, engineer, mixing
- Larry Fergusson – engineer
- Jason Gossman – engineer
- Bill Mims – engineer
- Gavin Lurssen – mastering
- Reuben Cohen – mastering
- David Ensminger – photography
- Greg Allen – art direction, design
- Mark Linett – tape transfer
