= Hungry for Music =

American nonprofit organization

- Company type: Non-governmental organization
- Industry: musical charity
- Headquarters: Washington, D.C., United States
- Key people: Jeff Campbell (Founder)
- Products: Compact discs (for financial support)
- Website: www.hungryformusic.org

Hungry for Music is a charitable nonprofit organization located in Washington, D.C., that works to support music education and cultural enrichment, and acquires and provides musical instruments to underprivileged children around the world. Hungry for Music was founded and is directed by Jeff Campbell, and became a nonprofit 501(c)(3) charity organization in 1994. To date, the nonprofit has distributed thousands of free musical instruments to underprivileged children, groups and schools.

== Support ==
The organization acquires income, in part, through the sale of compact discs the organization produces. Campbell has also had success in acquiring major artists for the compilation compact discs, including licensed songs from performers such as Bruce Springsteen, Bob Dylan, Paul Simon and others. Other sources of income include conducting raffles, membership sales and concerts.

=== Federal grants ===
Hungry for Music was granted a Resources and Equipment grant from the National Educational Association in 2011.

=== Donors ===
Hungry for music is supported by many notable donors, including Vanguard, Hard Rock Cafe, BMI, Violins Etc., Strathmore, Austin Grill, Tau Beta Sigma fraternity, Mark's Kitchen, Rockport, and National Chamber Ensemble, among others.

Hungry for Music was showcased by BMI and Hard Rock Cafe in February 2011.
