= Paul Collins (musician) =

American musician and author (born 1956)

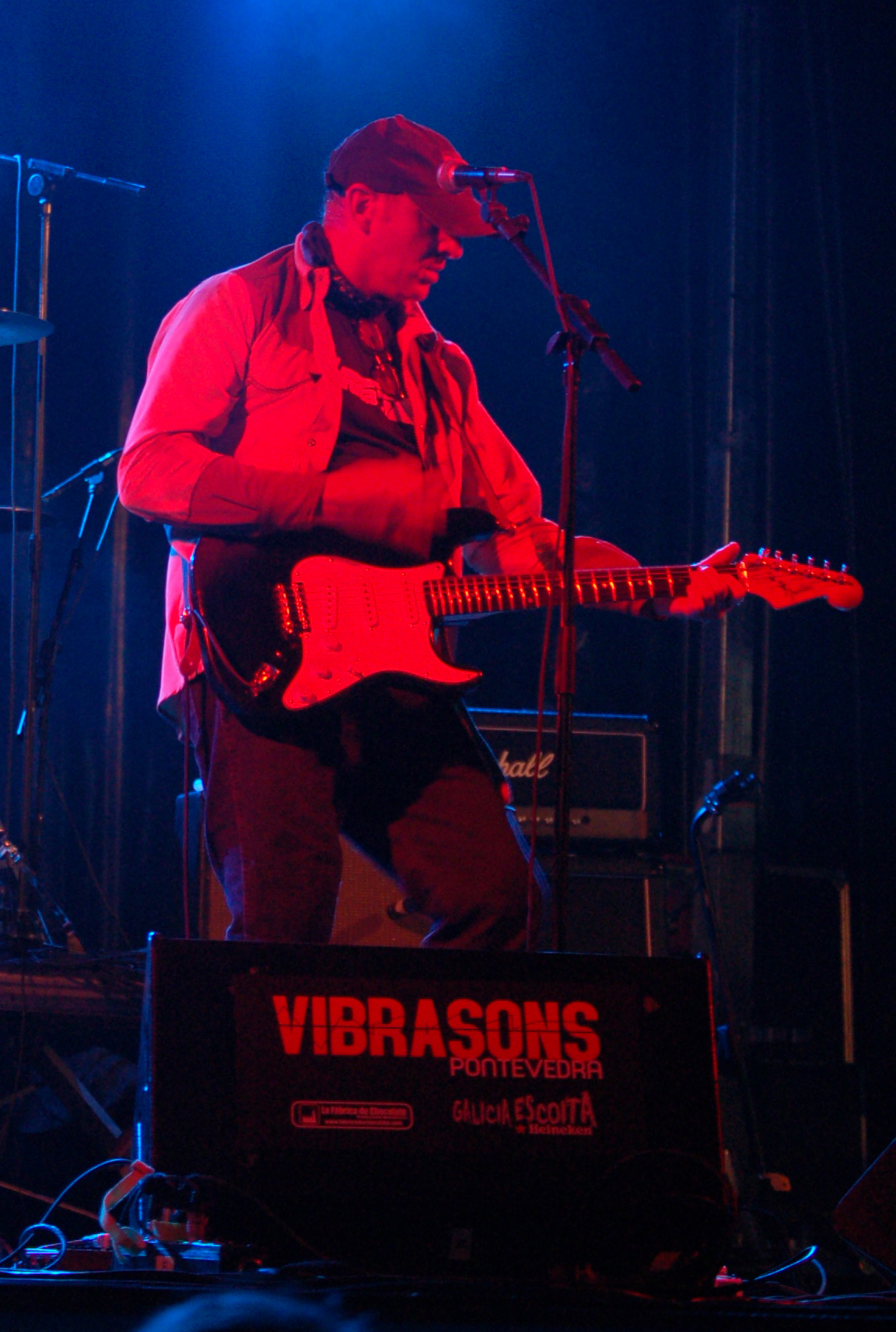
- Performing in Pontevedra, Spain in 2008

Background information
- Born: 1956 (age 69–70)
- Origin: New York City, United States
- Genres: Alternative rock, rock, power pop, punk rock, alternative country, folk rock, post-punk, garage rock, garage punk, indie rock, indie pop
- Instruments: Vocals, guitar, drums
- Years active: 1974–present
- Labels: Columbia, MVS (France), Caroline Records, Sony Music, Warner Music Group, Get Hip Records, Bomp! Records, Alive Records
- Website: www.thepaulcollinsbeat.com

Paul Vincent Collins (born 1956) is an American writer, author, music producer, and multi-instrumentalist. He is best known for his work in the power pop groups The Nerves, The Breakaways and The Beat.

== Biography ==
Collins was born in New York City. As a child, he lived in Old Tappan, New Jersey and Manhasset, New York. While a resident of Leonia, New Jersey, he formed a band called Home Grown. He attended Leonia Alternative High School.

Collins has released several solo projects with his alternative country group The Paul Collins Band, who play Americana music inspired by country rock and folk rock. Collins also continues to tour with his The Beat, an ever-changing lineup rock group which combines power pop with alternative rock and punk rock.

Collins began his career as the drummer (and sometime singer & songwriter) in an influential Los Angeles power pop trio The Nerves, alongside Jack Lee and future Plimsouls frontman Peter Case. The band is best remembered for "Hanging on the Telephone", a song later made famous by Blondie. Hanging on the Telephone was written by Jack Lee.

After Jack Lee left the Nerves, Collins and Peter Case continued practicing and recording with a variety of guitarists as the Breakaways; their best known song is "Walking out on Love", a song frequently performed by the Nerves in concert but never recorded by them. Tapes of their sessions surfaced in the late 2000s and were released on a compilation album in 2009.

Next, Collins formed his own group as singer, rhythm guitarist, and songwriter for The Beat, sometimes called The Paul Collins Beat to avoid confusion with the British ska group also called The Beat (or The English Beat in the US).

The Beat also known as The English Beat, were sued by Sony/Columbia in 1979. The same year, Sony/Columbia released Collins' self-titled debut in 1979.

Renamed the Paul Collins' Beat in the early 1980s, the band became icons in the genre of indie rock Paul Collins' Beat were in a constant state of touring and recording around the world. They appeared on Dick Clark's American Bandstand and contributed a song to the Caddyshack soundtrack, alongside Journey and Kenny Loggins. The band broke up in 1989, following the release of their sixth album, One Night. Paul Collins continues to perform to this day with ever-changing versions of Paul Collins' Beat, in addition to his solo project, country-rock band called the Paul Collins Band.

Since the early 1980s, Collins has been living on and off in Spain, where he has a particularly strong following, and spends most of his time performing in Europe and Japan, although he still holds citizenship in the United States. In fact, his two former wives are from Spain. During this time, he produced several Spanish pop bands, including La Granja, Los Limones and Los Protones.

In 2005, Collins released his first solo album of the decade, Flying High. The music received strong reviews and is reminiscent of the catchy power pop of The Beat, particularly in the opening song, Rock and Roll Shoes. Additionally, Flying High showcases Paul Collins' alt-country, roots-rock and Americana styles, with the singles Will You Be A Woman and Afton Place, which were released worldwide as music videos.

In March 2008, Paul Collins released Ribbon of Gold as the follow-up to 2005's critically acclaimed Flying High. This album contains several songs the band performs live in concert, including Falling in Love With Her, I Still Want You, Big Pop Song and She Doesn't Want To Hang Around With You.

In June 2008 Paul Collins moved back to his native New York City where he currently resides.

In 2009, Paul Collins released a fictional autobiography, entitled Mi madre, mi mentor y yo, in addition to writing a humour filled fictional autobiography 8 Million Stories: Pete The Fly. Copies of which seem nearly impossible to find. Paul Collins' Beat next release will be a split 7-inch with the Italian powerpop band Radio Days. The split will be released by the Italian label Surfin Ki Records in March 2010, followed by a full-length album released by Alive Naturalsound in Fall 2010.

In 2012 Paul Collins recorded a version of "Here Comes That Rainy Day Feeling Again" for a fund raising cd titled "Super Hits of the Seventies" for radio station WFMU.

== Green Day and Broadway musical cover a Paul Collins song ==
In 2010, the American punk rock band Green Day launched the American Idiot Broadway Musical Production. Beginning when Theo Stockman departed the show (he and frontman Billie Joe Armstrong were both fans), a live rendition of the song "Walking Out on Love" would regularly be performed during the curtain call, which was written by Paul Collins. The song was previously recorded by Collins' groups The Beat, The Nerves and The Breakaways. To celebrate the success of the musical, The Paul Collins Beat joined Green Day onstage for live performances in New York.

== Paul Collins and Peter Case reunion tribute to the Nerves ==
In 2012, longtime friends and musical partners, Paul Collins and Peter Case announced a reunion tour paying tribute to their bands The Nerves, The Breakaways, The Beat and The Plimsouls. The touring band lineup for the Collins and Case tour was augmented by members of The Paul Collins Beat, Timm Buechler on bass and Amos Pitsch on drums, offering audiences with a full-band electric showcase. The tour included a date in Austin, Texas, where actor Bill Murray made a surprise appearance at the concert to introduce the band. Collins' group The Beat had previously appeared on the Caddyshack original motion picture soundtrack alongside Murray in 1979. Due to personality issues, Paul Collins was dismissed from the tour which continued without him.

== The Paul Collins Beat tour with The English Beat ==
In Fall 2012, The Paul Collins Beat joined a package tour "The Two Beats Hearting As One Tour," co-headlining with Two-tone Ska group The Beat. The English Beat and The Paul Collins Beat were both part of the "new wave" of bands to emerge from the late 1970s and early 1980s. Ironically, the styles of music they play are very different. Both bands helped to define their respective genres, making them legends. The tour package will include dates at large music halls, casinos, auditoriums and clubs. According to a September 2012 interview with Collins, "Contrary to what the internet fabricates, there never was and is no animosity toward The English Beat. I am still a big fan of The English Beat. Ska is really cool music. Dave is a good friend. He's always so nice and always upbeat. He's just as supportive of my music as I am of his. Both of our fanbases are enjoying hearing each other's music." According to an October 2012 press release, Dave Wakeling stated, "Paul and I originally met back in '83 and have been in touch occasionally over the years, but recently we've been in closer Facebook contact, which led to this idea becoming a reality....Two beats, hearting as one!”

== The Beat Army ==
During 2005, Collins launched a new music program and partner-based booking agency that was recently renamed as The Beat Army. Collins created a forum where fans, bands, clubs, venues, radio stations, music festivals, blogs and record stores can network. Groups have the opportunity to swap shows, while Collins cross-promotes his various musical projects and tours.

The interaction between Paul Collins' Beat and other bands has enabled him to book shows on several continents and establish a worldwide network of industry friends, fans, musicians and artists from the genres of rock, punk rock, power pop, new wave, alternative rock, ska, garage rock, hardcore punk, classic rock and roll, skate punk, emo, melodic hardcore, grindcore, crust punk, grunge, skacore, heavy metal, Thrash metal, crossover thrash, metalcore, rapcore, post-hardcore and speed metal, alternative country, Americana, country rock, folk rock, rock and roll and rockabilly.

The business model for The Beat Army is a simple process in which Paul Collins' Beat and regional bands join forces to book small tours on their own DIY style. The bands share equipment and transportation, lodgings are supplied by local bands and or fans who welcome the musicians into their homes.

With Collins' solo albums distinctly different from his rock material and heavily rooted in the genres of American roots music, he continues to maintain a diversified fanbase. The Beat Army has enabled Collins to book shows with bands and artists in genres such as singer-songwriter, alternative country, Americana music, country rock, folk rock, and rockabilly.

== Discography ==
=== With The Nerves ===
- Nerves (Nerves, 1976)
- One Way Ticket (Bomp/Alive Records, 2009)
- The Nerves Live at the Pirate's Cove (Bomp/Alive Records, 2010)

=== With the Breakaways ===
- Walking out on Love (The Lost Sessions) (Bomp/Alive Records, 2009)

=== With The Beat ===
- The Beat (CBS, 1979)
- The Kids Are The Same (CBS, 1981)
- To Beat Or Not To Beat (1983)
- Long Time Gone (1985)
- Live at Universal (Twins, 1986)
- One Night (Sony, 1989)

=== Solo albums ===
- Paul Collins (Sony DRO, 1992)
- From Town To Town (Caroline Records, 1993)
- Live in Spain (Not Lame, 1997)
- Let's Go (2006)
- King Of Power Pop! (Alive Records, 2010)
- Live in Concert (2012)
- Feel The Noise (Alive Records, 2014)
- Out Of My Head (Alive Records, 2018)

=== DVDs ===
- Live in Concert (2012)

=== As The Paul Collins Beat ===
- Flying High (Lucinda/Get Hip, 2005)
- Ribbon of Gold (Rock Indiana/Get Hip, 2008)
- King of Powerpop (Alive Naturalsound, 2010)
- Feel The Noise (Alive Naturalsound, 2014)

=== In tribute to Paul Collins, Peter Case and Jack Lee ===
- Under the Covers Vol. 2: A Tribute to Paul Collins, Peter Case and Jack Lee (Volar Records/I Hate Rock and Roll Records)

== See also ==
- H1N1 (band)

== Bibliography ==
- Collins, Paul: Mi madre, mi mentor y yo, Gamuza Azul, Bilbao, Spain, 2006. ISBN 84-932124-4-X.
