= The Plimsouls =

American rock band

- The Plimsouls in the 1980s

Background information
- Origin: Paramount, California
- Genres: Power pop, alternative rock, Paisley Underground, post-punk
- Years active: 1978–1983, 1995–1998, 2005, 2007
- Labels: Beat, Planet, Geffen, Alive Naturalsound, New Rose, Varese
- Past members: Peter Case; Dave Pahoa; Louie Ramírez; Eddie Muñoz
- Website: https://www.facebook.com/theplimsouls.now

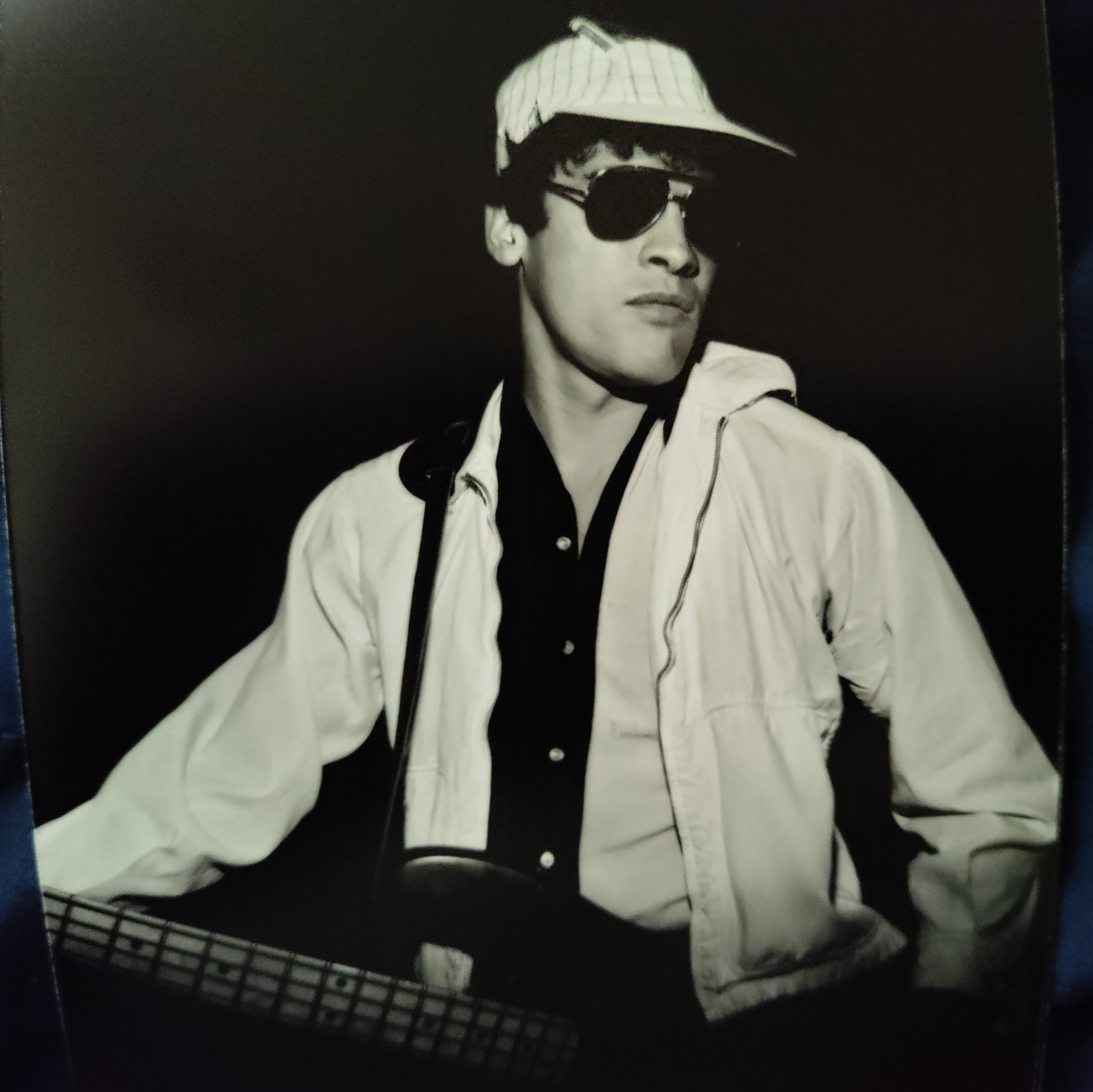
Dave Pahoa

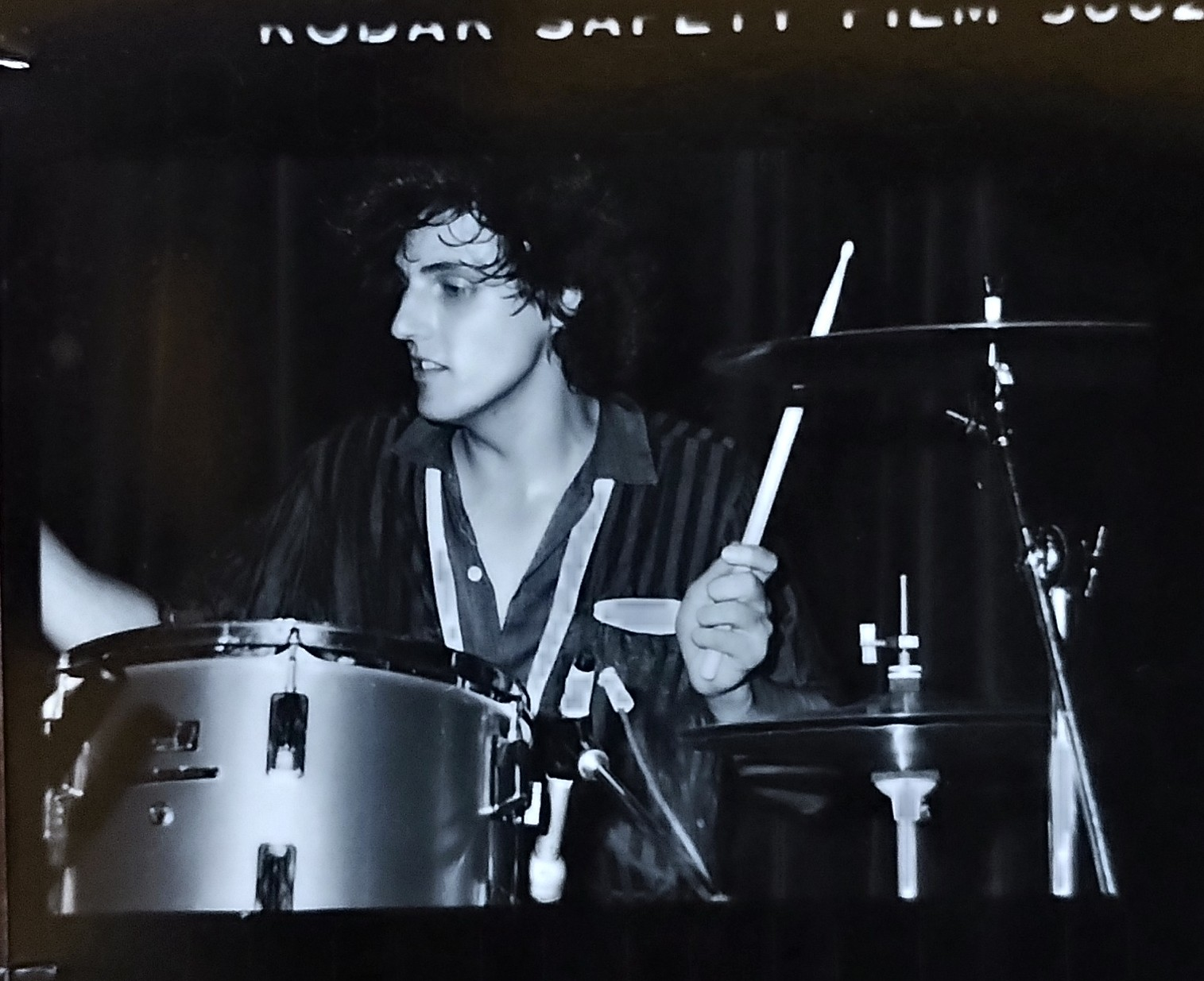
Drummer Lou Ramirez

The Plimsouls were an American rock band known for their hit 1982 single "A Million Miles Away", which was featured in the 1983 movie Valley Girl.

== History ==
The band was formed in Paramount, California, in 1978. They recorded two full-length albums and an EP and then split up in 1984. Different configurations of the original members have reunited intermittently since.

Formed by singer, songwriter and guitarist Peter Case (who had previously fronted the power pop band the Nerves), the Plimsouls began as a trio in 1978, initially named the Tone Dogs, which included Case, bassist Dave Pahoa, and drummer Lou Ramírez. From inception, the band quickly became a crowd favorite in the Los Angeles club scene. Long Beach promoter Stephen Zepeda signed the group to his Beat Records label for a five-song EP called Zero Hour which was released in 1980. Guitarist Eddie Muñoz joined the group during the recording of the EP, but did not play on it. The band's name came from a tweaking of "plimsoll", a type of shoe popular in the UK and favoured by the Beatles.

Danny Holloway produced the Zero Hour EP and managed the group. The song "Zero Hour" received heavy airplay on KROQ-FM, and the Plimsouls grew to be one of the top club draws in the city. Case received critical praise for his songwriting. In 1980, Planet Records signed the group and in February 1981 released their self-titled debut album which Holloway also produced. The single "Now" received strong local airplay in Los Angeles and was also covered by Phil Seymour, appearing on the 2011 CD edition of his second album. Seymour also appeared live with the Plimsouls during the late 1970s, both as a guest vocalist and as an artist on the same bill.

=== Second album/Valley Girl ===
The band received some national attention in 1982 when the single "A Million Miles Away" was released on their own Shaky City record label, distributed by Bomp! Records. The song reached No. 11 on the Billboard Top Tracks chart and was featured in the 1983 film Valley Girl. The band appeared in the film performing the song and parts of two others. The song was also included on the band's second album, Everywhere at Once, released May 18, 1983, by Geffen Records. "A Million Miles Away" was re-released as a single in 1983 and peaked at No. 82 on the Billboard Hot 100 chart. The band broke up in 1984. Several years later, in 1990, a then up-and-coming band named the Goo Goo Dolls covered "A Million Miles Away" on their Hold Me Up album. A re-recorded version of the song is also included on the soundtrack album to the 1994 film Speed.

=== Reunion ===
Case has continued with a solo career since the band's mid-1980s breakup. In 1996, the Plimsouls, without Ramirez, reunited for a few shows and some recording sessions, resulting in a little-heard reunion album called Kool Trash. This album featured drumming by new band member Clem Burke, who was also simultaneously a member of Blondie.

The Plimsouls have continued to reunite occasionally since that time, with Burke being replaced by Bryan Head.

In 2016 Muñoz registered a trademark for the band's name, and began touring as the Plimsouls, without the involvement of Case, Pahoa, or Ramirez. The Plimsouls brought legal action, which was decided in their favor; the name is owned by the Plimsouls, and "further use by Muñoz of the name would only cause confusion".

Original Plimsouls bassist David Pahoa died in September 2023.

== Discography ==
=== Studio albums ===
- The Plimsouls (1981), Planet Records – U.S. No. 153
- Everywhere at Once (1983), Geffen Records – U.S. No. 186
- Kool Trash (1998), Fuel 2000/Shaky City Records

=== Live albums ===
- One Night in America (1988)
- Live! Beg, Borrow & Steal, Oct. 1981 (2010)
- Beach Town Confidential (live 1983) (2012)

=== Singles and EPs ===
- Zero Hour (1980), Beat Records
- "Now" / "When You Find Out" (1981), Planet
- "A Million Miles Away" / "I'll Get Lucky" (1982), Shaky City
- "A Million Miles Away" / "Play the Breaks" (1983), Geffen – US No. 82

=== Compilation appearances ===
- "He Put the Bomp in the Bomp" – Tribute to Greg Shaw CD (2007)
