= Denise Sullivan =

American music journalist and historian

- Occupations: Music journalist; author
- Spouse: Peter Case
- Writing career
- Period: 1991–present
- Notable work: Keep on Pushing: Black Power Music from Blues to Hip-hop
- Website: denisesullivan.com

Denise Sullivan is an American music journalist, cultural worker and reporter, author of several music biographies including the critically acclaimed music-history book, Keep on Pushing: Black Power Music from Blues to Hip-hop, and editor of the San Francisco story collection, Your Golden Sun Still Shines.

== Early life and education ==
Sullivan first began writing about music for her high school newspaper in Cupertino, California while working as a record-store clerk. At the University of San Francisco, Sullivan joined radio station KUSF and adopted the DJ name Marie London. By the early 1980s, the station became one of the first in the nation to program punk rock and new wave music under its new 24-hour format. San Francisco had become home to an underground art-rock scene that morphed into punk and new wave within the span of five years, starting in the late 1970s.

Sullivan would graduate from USF with a degree in media studies, and went on to several roles in the music industry, including club DJ, publicist for 415 Records, and record-store owner. Working as an alternative-music marketing manager for Warner Brothers Records, touring throughout the southeast with bands including Faith No More and Jesus and Mary Chain, gave her an insider perspective on the music business. She went into music journalism full-time in 1991.

== Career ==
=== Music journalist ===
Sullivan wrote a live-music column, “The Show Goes On”, for The Contra Costa Times from 1992 to 2006. During that time she also was a contributor to The San Francisco Chronicle, SF Weekly, SF Bay Guardian, The Express, BAM and Raygun, among other publications. Her work also appeared on Rolling Stone online, as well as the popular '90s rock webzine Addicted to Noise.

In 2007, Sullivan began “The Origin of Song” column for Crawdaddy! online, where she contributed reviews, profiles and interviews with classic rock and soul musicians. She profiled rock icons in her “What Makes a Legend” feature and focused on punk and new wave in a “Class of ’77” series. Sullivan's interview subjects during her Crawdaddy! tenure included Bettye LaVette, Yoko Ono, Van Dyke Parks, Richie Havens, Janis Ian, Buffy Sainte-Marie, and Solomon Burke. Post-Crawdaddy!, she freelanced for the music magazines Paste and Blurt, and contributed an article on Tjinder Singh to the activism website Stir to Action. In 2018, she continued to write a monthly music column for Tourworthy online, and became a regular contributor to Downbeat.

Sullivan has contributed to several music reference books including The All Music Guide to Rock, The Rough Guide to Country Music, The MOJO Collection, and The Girl’s Guide to Taking Over the World.

=== Author ===
Sullivan has written music biographies on The White Stripes (The White Stripes: Sweethearts of the Blues) and R.E.M. (R.E.M. – Talk About the Passion). A collection of her work, Rip It Up! Rock’n’Roll Rulebreakers, features interviews with an array of iconoclasts in the rock world, including Wanda Jackson, The Kinks, Camper Van Beethoven, and the late Ike Turner.

Sullivan's 2011 book, Keep on Pushing: Black Power Music From Blues to Hip Hop, covers the history of African American music and its significance in the civil rights movement. As a history and analysis of roots, blues, jazz, disco, punk and hip-hop, the book focuses on popular music as a force for social transformation. Through oral history and historical research, Keep on Pushing is a guide to the music that gave rise to the black power movement, which is further linked to the gay rights and feminism. The book features a profile of folk musician and activist, Len Chandler, one of the few interviews with the singer-songwriter to appear in print.

Stephen Shames' documentary photography in his 2006 book, The Black Panthers, was the initial inspiration for Keep on Pushing. Being a self-confessed “record geek,” Sullivan found her book's storyline in American music, noting, in a quote attributed to Odetta, “you can either lie down and die, or insist on your own individual life. Those people who made up the songs were the ones who insisted upon life and living…”. Sullivan defines music in Keep on Pushing as history, “…and when we are talking about American music for change, it is tied directly to the African American struggle for freedom and equality.” She clarifies that the book is, “…an alternative to the usual history, a people’s history, with emphasis on musicians and songs.”

The book has received mostly favorable reviews. David Ensminger, of PopMatters, praises Sullivan's focus on women musicians linked to the civil rights movement, noting that “…Odetta and Nina Simone, hold sway and never surrender; even Billie Holiday, often associated with a bygone generation, provides her Strange Fruit as a kind of template, a way to ignore simple plaintive sentiment and jazz-spiel in favor of concerns for justice and a probe of history, with all the pain intact.” Ensminger points out that the book is not “…an all-inclusive, push-button reference,” but serves “to examine the oft-overlooked underdogs whose work is powerful and challenging.”

More reviews:

A pleasing survey of soul music, from Lead Belly to Johnny Otis to Michael Franti to Louis Farrakhan...Sullivan offers a welcome exploration of how African-American popular music became America’s vernacular. — Kirkus Reviews

Sullivan...combines impressive research and wide-ranging interviews in a multilayered narrative about the power of music within black liberation, civil rights, antiwar, and gender-related movements...This is for anyone interested in a thorough analysis of music as a commanding force in change as well as a continually evolving artistic presence. — Library Journal

Great book...Go get it. — Chuck D, Public Enemy

=== Other writing ===
Sullivan has contributed to The Virgin Guide to San Francisco (Virgin Publishing, 2000) and Underground San Francisco (Manic D Press, 1995). She became a guest contributor to the political blog, Down With Tyranny in 2015. In 2016, Sullivan was the Alley Cat writer-in-residence which culminated in the publication of the limited edition chapbook, "Awful Sweet." Sullivan was the editor and contributed to "Your Golden Sun Still Shines: San Francisco Personal Histories and Short Fictions" (Manic D Press, 2017), an anthology of writings about the city under pressure of gentrification. She co-edited "The City Is Already Speaking: The Sound of Calle 24," (United Booksellers, 2018) and published a second chapbook, The Rakish Tam (Phony Lid Books, 2018). She was a bi-monthly columnist for The San Francisco Examiner, profiling San Francisco residents under the banner, "S.F. Lives: the everyday people who make The City extraordinary" from 2018-2022. "I Want To Know," her writing on Sugar Pie DiSanto appears in a Reflections II: The Creative Process by artist James Gayles (Pochino Press, 2019). Her title essay appears in the catalog California Rocks! Photographers Who Made The Scene 1960-1980 (Sonoma Valley Museum of Art, 2020).

== Bibliography ==
R.E.M.—Talk About the Passion: An Oral History, Da Capo Press, 1998; ISBN 0306808579

The White Stripes: Sweethearts of the Blues, Backbeat Books, 2004; ISBN 0879308052

Rip It Up! Rock ’n’ Roll Rulebreakers, Backbeat Books, 2006; ISBN 0879306351

Keep on Pushing: Black Power Music from Blues To Hip Hop, Chicago Review Press, 2011; ISBN 1556528175

Shaman's Blues: The Art & Influences Behind Jim Morrison & The Doors, Sumach-Red Books, 2014; ISBN 1937753034

Your Golden Sun Still Shines: San Francisco Personal Histories and Small Fictions, editor, Manic D Press, 2017; ISBN 9781945665059
