= Peter Case =

American singer-songwriter (born 1954)

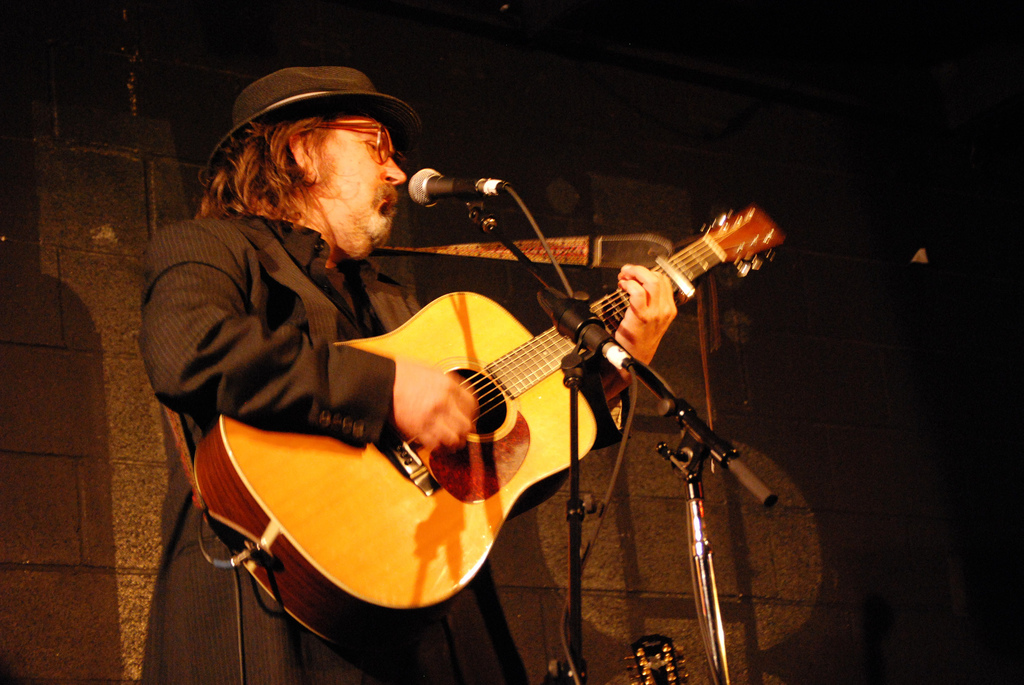
- Case at McCabe's, 2008

Background information
- Born: April 5, 1954 (age 72); Buffalo, New York, United States
- Genres: Rock and roll, blues, folk rock
- Occupations: Singer-songwriter, guitarist
- Instruments: Vocals, guitar, harmonica, piano, organ, bass
- Labels: Geffen, Vanguard, Alive/Naturalsound, Yep Roc
- Website: petercase.com

Peter Case (born April 5, 1954) is an American singer-songwriter and guitarist. His career is wide-ranging, from rock n' roll and blues, to folk rock and solo acoustic performance.

== Biography ==
=== Early career ===
Case was born in Buffalo, New York and lived in nearby Hamburg, New York. He wrote his first song "Stay Away," in 1965, at the age of eleven. A veteran of several rock bands and the local bar scene as a teenager, Case dropped out of high school when he was fifteen (he would later earn a GED), and after several years of traveling arrived in 1973 in San Francisco, where he performed as a street musician. During this period a documentary about the local music scene, Nightshift, directed by Bert Deivert, captured the young Case on film. In 1976, he teamed up with Jack Lee and Paul Collins to form the early punk-era band the Nerves in San Francisco. The group's 1976 EP track, "Hanging on the Telephone", was later recorded by Blondie.

The Nerves moved to Los Angeles on January 1, 1977, and played and promoted some of the first punk-era shows in that city, performing at The Masque, and the Whisky a Go Go, among other venues. They toured nationally in 1977, the first independent band of their era to do a national tour, as they opened shows for the Ramones, and Mink DeVille, and performed on co-bills with the Nuns, Devo, and Pere Ubu.

After the Nerves broke up in 1978, Case formed the rock n' roll band the Plimsouls in 1979. The Plimsouls became one of the top drawing live bands in California soon after the release of their debut EP "Zero Hour" on the Beat Records label in 1979. They grew in popularity and had two major label albums, the first on Planet/Elektra in 1981, and the next on Geffen Records, in 1983. In 1982, "A Million Miles Away" was released as a 12" single, on the Shaky City/Bomp! label, and became the band's signature song. It was a radio hit in California, and some other regions of the U.S. It eventually charted at No. 82 on the Billboard Hot 100. Their songs "A Million Miles Away," "The Oldest Story in the World," and "Everywhere At Once" were included in the movie Valley Girl (1983), but by the time that movie had become a cult favorite, the group had broken up.

Case briefly performed with Gurf Morlix, Victoria Williams (Case's first wife), and Warren Tornado Klein as the Incredibly Strung Out Band, but their collaboration never resulted in a record.

=== Solo career ===
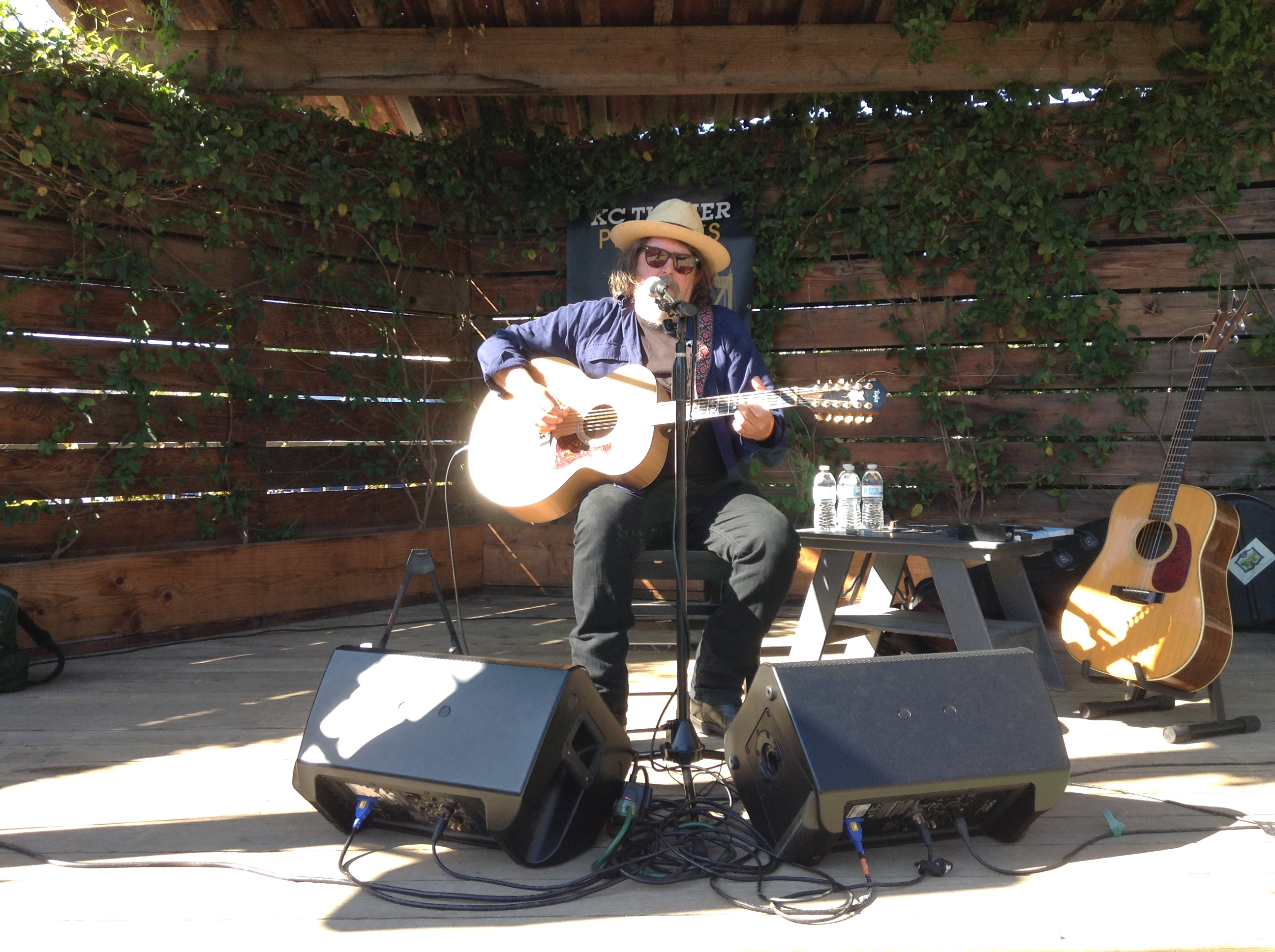
Case at Hopmonk Tavern in Novato California, 2016

Case struck out on his own with the self-titled album Peter Case released in 1986 on Geffen Records. Produced by T Bone Burnett and Mitchell Froom, the record included three songs co-written by Burnett and one by Victoria Williams, and also featured the talents of Williams, Morlix, Klein, Mike Campbell (of Tom Petty and the Heartbreakers), John Hiatt, Jim Keltner, Jerry Marotta, Roger McGuinn (of The Byrds), and Van Dyke Parks, among others. One of the songs on the album, "Old Blue Car," was nominated for a Grammy Award. Robert Palmer chose the album as the No. 1 release for 1986 in his year-in-review wrap-up for The New York Times.

In 1989, Case released a second solo album, The Man With the Blue Post-Modern Fragmented Neo-Traditionalist Guitar, this time with the help of artists like David Hidalgo of Los Lobos, Ry Cooder, and Benmont Tench. While not a major commercial success, the album was a favorite of critics and other musicians: Bruce Springsteen told Rolling Stone magazine that he was listening to Peter Case more than anyone else that year.

In 1992, Case scored a radio hit with the song "Dream About You" which peaked at No. 16 on the U.S. Billboard Modern Rock charts. After a third album for Geffen, Six-Pack of Love, Case recorded a live-in-the-studio album of cover versions of folk, blues, and country songs, Peter Case Sings Like Hell, which was released on Case's own Travelin' Light label. Case signed a contract with Vanguard Records, and the record was re-released on that label in 1993. His next Vanguard record, Torn Again, was issued in 1995, and features Case with a band including the rhythm section of Don Heffington and Jerry Scheff, with Greg Leisz on guitar.

In 1996, the Plimsouls reunited for the first of several reunions. Throughout the 1990s and early 2000s, Case continued to release albums as a solo performer, moving in an increasingly acoustic-oriented direction, and playing clubs and small venues. Torn Again was followed by Full Service No Waiting (1998), Flying Saucer Blues (2000), and Beeline (2002) all on Vanguard, in addition to Thank You St. Jude (2001), a self-released CD that featured David Perales on fiddle and background vocals. In a review of Flying Saucer Blues, critic Bill Wasserzieher declared, "I am convinced that nobody of Case's generation writes better songs or does better work in the tradition of Woody Guthrie."

In 2004 Vanguard released Who's Gonna Go Your Crooked Mile, a compilation of tracks from his albums for the label, which also included two previously unrecorded songs, "Wake Up Call" and "My Generation's Golden Handcuff Blues". Both tracks gave evidence of Case's strongly held political convictions.

In the late 1990s, he curated the musical program for the Getty Museum in Los Angeles. In 2001, he organized, produced, and performed on Avalon Blues, a tribute album to blues music pioneer Mississippi John Hurt, which was nominated for the 2002 Grammy Award for Best Traditional Folk Album. Case also performed Beatles songs at the Hollywood Bowl with George Martin. Case's solo performances have featured his own compositions as well as covers of songs by Memphis Minnie, Sleepy John Estes, Bob Dylan, Neil Young, and others. He frequently conducts songwriting workshops in California, where he now resides, and in other locations.

In February 2006, Hungry for Music, a non-profit organization based in Washington, DC, released a three-disc tribute to Case, entitled A Case for Case; the set featured cover versions of Case's songs performed by various artists, including John Prine, Susan Cowsill, Joe Ely, Dave Alvin, Maura O'Connell and others.

In 2006 Case began posting on his blog sections of a memoir entitled As Far As You Can Get Without a Passport, which was subsequently issued in book form in January 2007 by Everthemore Books. The memoir covers Case's very early days from the time he left his native upstate New York and wound up singing and playing on the streets of San Francisco. This period inspired some of his most memorable songs, including "Entella Hotel "and "Travellin' Light." John Doe, co-founder of the Los Angeles punk band X, contributed an introduction to the book. Case has continued to write and post autobiographical additional material.

On December 6, 2007, Case's Let Us Now Praise Sleepy John was nominated for a Grammy Award for Best Traditional Folk Album. The record was produced by Ian Brennan. The album featured "Every 24 Hours," a duet with Richard Thompson on harmony vocals and guitar, and "That Soul Twist," a duet with Merle Haggard pedal-steel man Norm Hamlet.

In January 2009, Case underwent heart surgery, leading to fund raising efforts by other musicians to help defray his medical costs. Case's next project, Wig!, a CD/LP was released on June 29, 2010, by Yep Roc Records. The record was an interpretation of electric blues, and featured D.J. Bonebrake on drums, and Memphis musician Ron Franklin on slide guitar and electric piano. Case and Franklin composed a number of the songs the day before the sessions, which lasted three days.

In 2012, The Case Files, a compilation of "studio out-takes, demos, and live shots," was released by Alive Naturalsound Records. This record included two 1985 demos made with T Bone Burnett, some spoken word pieces with music from a longer piece called Bomblight Prayer Vigil, and various other Case rarities.

In December 2014, Case went into the Carriage House studio in Los Angeles, and recorded HWY 62, an LP of new original songs, with a band including Ben Harper on lead guitar, D.J. Bonebrake of X, on drums, keyboardist Jebin Bruni, and bassist David Carpenter. The album was released in 2015.

September 2016 saw the re-release of his debut solo album expanded with 7 extra tracks.

In December 2019, Case went to The Old Whaling Church in Martha's Vineyard and recorded with producer Ron Franklin,The Midnight Broadcast, a concept album of traditional and contemporary material featuring Cindy Wasserman (vocals), Bert Deivert (mandolin, drums, vocals), Lee Fortier (harmonica, vocals) Franklin (moog, maracas) and Ross Johnson (as the DJ). Mixed by Boo Mitchell at Royal Recorders in Memphis, the album was released in 2021.

== Reunion tribute tour ==
In 2012, longtime musical partners Case and Paul Collins announced a reunion tour paying tribute to their groups the Nerves, the Breakaways, the Beat and the Plimsouls. The touring band line-up for the Collins and Case tour was augmented by members of the Paul Collins Beat (Timm Buechler, bass, and Amos Pitsch of Tenement, drums, and Tim Schweiger, a veteran musician). According to the Los Angeles Times Music Blog of March 22, 2012, the tour "fell apart" early due to "musical differences".

== Bibliography ==
- Bomblight Prayer Vigil. Verb, Issue Two. 2006.
- As Far As You Can Get Without a Passport. Everthemore. 2007.
- Epistolary Rex, With David Ensminger. CreateSpace. 2011.
- Somebody Told The Truth: Selected Lyrics and Stories. Boom & Chime Books. 2020.
