= Stan Ridgway discography =

- Studio albums: 9
- EPs: 1
- Live albums: 6
- Compilation albums: 2
- Tribute albums: 1
- Singles: 16

This article presents the discography of American singer-songwriter Stan Ridgway.

== Albums ==
=== Studio albums ===
Title	Album details	US	AUS	GER	NLD	NOR	SWI
The Big Heat	Released: 1986; Label: I.R.S.; Formats: CD, CS, LP	131	61	38	62	11	27
Mosquitos	Released: April 25, 1989; Label: Geffen, I.R.S.; Formats: CD, CS, LP	—	—	—	—	—	—
Partyball	Released: May, 1991; Label: Geffen, I.R.S.; Formats: CD, CS, LP	—	—	—	—	—	—
Black Diamond	Released: 1996; Label: Birdcage Records; Formats: CD	—	—	—	—	—	—
The Way I Feel Today	Released: 1998; Label: Dis-Information; Formats: CD	—	—	—	—	—	—
Anatomy	Released: October 19, 1999; Label: Ultramodern/New West; Formats: CD	—	—	—	—	—	—
Blood (with Pietra Wexstun)	Released: September 23, 2003; Label: A440/Sympathy for the Record Industry; Formats: CD	—	—	—	—	—	—
Snakebite: Blacktop Ballads & Fugitive Songs	Released: July 13, 2004; Label: redFLY; Formats: CD	—	—	—	—	—	—
Silly Songs For Kids - Volume One (with Pietra Wexstun)	Released: 2009; Label: A440; Formats: CD	—	—	—	—	—	—
Neon Mirage	Released: August 24, 2010; Label: A440; Formats: CD	—	—	—	—	—	—
Mr. Trouble	Released: September 18, 2012; Label: A440; Formats: CD	—	—	—	—	—	—
Priestess of the Promised Land (with Pietra Wexstun)	Released: October 10, 2016; Label: A440; Formats: CD	—	—	—	—	—	—
"—" denotes a recording that did not chart or was not released in that territory.

=== Extended plays ===
Title	Album details
Film Songs	Released: 1997; Label: TWA; Formats: CD

=== Live albums ===
Year	Title
2001	Stan Ridgway Live: “Poolside with Gilly”
2002	Stan Ridgway Live: The “Beyond Tomorrow” Show
2002	Stan Ridgway Live in NYC: The “Black Diamond” Tour
2002	Stan Ridgway Live: The Mosquitos Tour
2011	Live in Byron Bay Australia 1987
2012	Live In Santa Clara CA 1991 at One Step Beyond

=== Compilation albums ===
Title	Album details
Songs That Made This Country Great	Released: February 25, 1992; Label: I.R.S.; Formats: CD, LP
Holiday in Dirt	Released: February 12, 2002; Label: Ultramodern/New West; Formats: CD
The Complete Epilogues	Released: 2011; Label: A440; Formats: CD

== Singles ==
Title	Year	US Mod Rock	AUS	AUT	BE	GER	IRE	NLD	NOR	PL	SWI	UK	UK^{Indie}	Album
"Don't Box Me In" (with Stewart Copeland)	1983	—	—	—	—	—	—	—	—	—	—	91	—	Non-album single
"The Big Heat"	1985	—	91	—	—	—	—	—	—	—	—	—	13	The Big Heat
"Salesman"	1985	—	—	—	—	—	—	—	—	—	—	—	—	The Big Heat
"Drive, She Said"	1985	—	60	—	—	—	—	—	—	—	—	—	—	The Big Heat
"Camouflage"	1986	—	76	17	7	8	2	11	—	2	11	4	—	The Big Heat
"Walkin' Home Alone"	1986	—	—	—	—	—	—	—	—	—	—	—	—	The Big Heat
"End of the Line"	1987	—	—	—	—	—	—	—	—	—	—	—	—	Non-album single
"Goin' Southbound"	1989	8	—	—	—	—	—	—	—	—	—	—	—	Mosquitos
"Calling Out to Carol"	1989	13	—	—	19	—	—	23	—	—	—	91	—	Mosquitos
"Lonely Town"	1989	—	—	—	—	—	—	—	—	—	—	—	—	Mosquitos
"I Wanna Be a Boss"	1991	13	—	—	—	—	—	—	—	—	—	—	—	Partyball
"Big Dumb Town"	1996	—	—	—	—	—	—	—	—	—	—	—	—	Black Diamond
"Knife and Fork"	1996	—	—	—	—	—	—	—	—	—	—	—	—	Black Diamond
"Mission Bell"	2000	—	—	—	—	—	—	—	—	—	—	—	—	Anatomy
"Burnin' for Your Love"	2012	—	—	—	—	—	—	—	—	—	—	—	—	Non-album single
"Rebel King"	2017	—	—	—	—	—	—	—	—	—	—	—	—	Non-album single
"—" denotes a recording that did not chart or was not released in that territory.
