= Bill Noland =

American musician

William D. Noland (born April 1, 1954) is an American musician, composer, and producer best known for his membership in the rock bands Wall of Voodoo and Human Hands during the late 1970s and '80s.

== Human Hands ==
Noland was a founding member of Human Hands and was their keyboard player who wrote and produced some of the band's material. Rodney Bingenheimer helped to break them by playing their music on KROQ-FM. Human Hands split up at the end of 1981 and Noland went on to become a member of Wall of Voodoo.

== Wall of Voodoo ==
Bill Noland joined the band shortly after the release of Call of the West on I.R.S. Records. Noland played keyboards, trumpet and sang back-up vocals with Wall of Voodoo while touring extensively in the USA, Canada, Puerto Rico, and the UK. The culmination of the tour was Wall of Voodoo's 1983 US Festival performance for an estimated crowd of 150,000 fans. Shortly afterward, Bill Noland, Stan Ridgway and Joe Nanini left the band.

== Solo career ==
After leaving Wall of Voodoo, Noland became a sound engineer, mixer and producer. He produced tracks for Thin White Rope on Frontier Records, Field Trip for Slash Records, and produced and collaborated with Ridgway on his solo albums, The Big Heat (IRS, 1986), Mosquitos (Geffen, 1989), Partyball (Geffen, 1991), Songs That Made This Country Great (IRS, 1992), Black Diamond (Birdcage, 1995), Work the Dumb Oracle (IRS, 1995) and The Way I Feel Today (Dis-Information, 1998).

Noland also worked as a foley and ADR engineer and mixer for Bryan Singer's film Public Access, and the films Wizard of Oz, and Snow White as well as numerous television and cartoon features.

Bill Noland composed and produced the scores for the 2001 film The Vampire Hunters Club and the 2003 film The Low Budget Time Machine.

Currently, Noland has two solo albums available, Mandala La La, and Red Naugahyde Clyde.
