= Rick King =

Rick King may refer to:

- Rick King (director), American director
- Rick King (American guitarist), American guitarist featured on the Stan Ridgway album Neon Mirage
- Rick King (Canadian musician), founding member of the Canadian rock band Chimo!
- Rick King (composer), American keyboardist, composer, and conductor who performed on the Olivia Newton-John 2006 World Tour
- Rick King (producer), producer of Blood Done Sign My Name
- Ricky King, German guitarist
