= The Flesh Eaters (disambiguation) =

The Flesh Eaters are an American punk rock band founded in 1977.

The Flesh Eaters or Flesh Eaters may refer to:

- The Flesh Eaters (film), a 1964 horror film
- Flesh Eaters (EP), a 1978 EP by The Flesh Eaters

== See also ==
- Flesheater, a 1988 horror film
- Flesh-eating disease, or necrotizing fasciitis
