= Big Heat =

Big Heat may refer to:

- The Big Heat, a 1953 film noir directed by Fritz Lang
- The Big Heat (1988 film), a Hong Kong action film directed by Johnnie To and Andrew Kam
- "The Big Heat" (The Batman), an episode of The Batman
- The Big Heat (album), a 1986 album by Stan Ridgway
  - "The Big Heat" (song), a 1986 song by Stan Ridgway
- Big Heat (album), a 2000 album by Leslie Cheung
