= Calling Out to Carol =

Single by Stan Ridgway

from the album Mosquitos
- B-side: "Can't Stop the Show" (live)
- Released: May 1, 1989
- Recorded: Capitol Studios, Impala Studios and Knobworld, CA
- Genre: New wave, reggae rock
- Length: 4:04
- Label: Geffen Records
- Songwriter: Stan Ridgway
- Producers: Joe Chiccarelli, Stan Ridgway

Stan Ridgway singles chronology
"Goin' Southbound" (1989)	"Calling Out to Carol" (1989)	"I Wanna Be a Boss" (1991)

"Calling Out to Carol" is a song by American singer-songwriter Stan Ridgway and is the third and final single released in support of his 1989 album Mosquitos.

Reviewing the song for Music Week, Jerry Smith called the song a "less than thrilling new single which doesn't bode too well for his forthcoming new LP, Mosquitos."

== Formats and track listing ==
All songs written by Stan Ridgway

UK 7" single (EIRS 106)

1. "Calling Out to Carol" – 4:04
2. "Can't Stop the Show" (live) – 3:51

UK 12" single (EIRST 106)

1. "Calling Out to Carol" – 4:04
2. "Can't Stop the Show" (live) – 3:51
3. "Drive, She Said" – 4:39

== Charts ==
Chart (1989)	Peak position
Belgium Singles Chart	19
Dutch Singles Chart	23
UK Singles Chart	91
U.S. Billboard Modern Rock Tracks	13
