= Forever Came Today (album) =

Studio album by the Flesh Eaters
- Released: May 2, 1982
- Recorded: February 14, 1982
- Genre: Punk, heavy metal, rock and roll
- Label: Ruby/Slash
- Producer: Chris D.

The Flesh Eaters chronology
A Minute to Pray, a Second to Die (1981)	Forever Came Today (1982)	American Youth Report (1982)

Forever Came Today is an album by the American band the Flesh Eaters, released on May 2, 1982. The band supported it with a North American tour. "My Life to Live" was rerecorded for the band's 2019 album, I Used to Be Pretty.

== Production ==
Forever Came Today was recorded on Valentine's Day 1982. Frontman Chris D. wanted a more stable lineup for the band, as he was tired of being unable to practice on a regular basis. He included spiritual themes in his lyrics, and lamented that most young hardcore punk listeners did not respond to such concerns. D. admired Motörhead and Girlschool and wanted his guitar playing to take on a more heavy metal sound. He was also influenced by Catholic imagery and horror movies. Steve Berlin contributed on saxophone. "The Rosy Hours" is about finding and talking with someone who sees the world in a similar fashion. "The Wedding Dice" is about a murder in Mexico. "A Minute to Pray, a Second to Die" employs a Bo Diddley beat.

== Critical reception ==
Professional ratings
Review scores
Source	Rating
AllMusic	4.5/5 stars
Robert Christgau	C+
The Great Indie Discography	6/10
Spin Alternative Record Guide	8/10

Robert Palmer, in The New York Times, called the album "a more readily accessible mixture of punk, heavy metal, and early rock-and-roll influences." He later wrote that D.'s singing is "an effectively eerie howl". The Argonaut described the album as "possessed, frenzied singing on an overlay of aggressive, pounding music". The Star Press noted that most of the songs are about love—"mostly the painful and brutal side—and seldom has the music been able to deal with this dark side of emotion any better than the Flesh Eaters can and do on Forever Came Today."

The Baltimore Sun opined that D.'s "word play is far too busy to be borne by the generally frail melodies, and as a result the album suffers from a terminal case of overreach." LA Weekly concluded that Forever Came Today "edges closer to the Great Punk-Metal Fusion". Robert Christgau panned D.'s voice and use of "horror-movie imagery" as metaphor.

The Spin Alternative Record Guide labeled Forever Came Today a "pure [blast] of high-energy stomp" and "a firestorm of unmatched ferocity". The Trouser Press Record Guide praised the "epics of sweaty desperation". In 2015, The Big Takeover called the album the band's masterpiece.

== Track listing ==
No.	Title	Length
1.	"My Life to Live"
2.	"A Minute to Pray, a Second to Die"
3.	"Secret Life"
4.	"Shallow Water"
5.	"The Rosy Hours"
6.	"The Wedding Dice"
7.	"Hand of Glory"
8.	"Drag My Name in the Mud"
9.	"Because of You (Every Legend Dies a Quick Death)"
10.	"Tightrope on Fire"
