= No Questions Asked (album) =

Studio album by the Flesh Eaters
- Released: 1980
- Studio: Program Recorders, Los Angeles; Mental Ward
- Genre: Punk rock; garage punk
- Length: 24:20
- Language: English
- Label: Upsetter
- Producer: Chris D.

The Flesh Eaters chronology
Flesh Eaters (1978)	No Questions Asked (1980)	A Minute to Pray, a Second to Die (1981)

No Questions Asked is the first studio album by Los Angeles punk rock band the Flesh Eaters, released in 1980 on Upsetter Records. (Note: Upsetter #UPCJ 34)

== Critical reception ==
Professional ratings
Review scores
Source	Rating
AllMusic	4/5 stars

Jay Hinman, from Perfect Sound Forever, was of the view that:

"... The album suffers a wee bit from muted production and some discontinuity, which is not particularly surprising given that eight musicians rotated through 14 short tracks ... The sound is sharp, static bursts of punk heat, dressed up with Chris’ phantasmagoric visions of plagues, hemorrhages and rabid cops. The sound is best represented on tracks like "Impossible Crime", "Dominoes" and "Police Gun Jitters" ... It’s worth noting that Desjardins’s tales were repeatedly inspired by B-movies (the name of the band being a prime example ...), with a ghoulishness particularly heard in the lyrics of this LP. No Questions Asked marked the end of the first wave of the Flesh Eaters, and gave birth to the all-star roots/voodoo combo of 1981’s A Minute to Pray, A Second To Die."

== Reissues ==
In February 2004, Atavistic Records released a remastered edition on CD (Note: Atavistic #ALP143CD) of the original record, which was extended with ten bonus tracks, including the entire four-song debut EP Flesh Eaters from 1978, (Note: Upsetter #UPSET 8) the three cuts contributed by the band to the Tooth and Nail compilation in 1979, (Note: Upsetter #UP WR 1&2) and three previously unreleased demo recordings from 1978. Mark Wheaton was in charge of the mastering at Catasonic Studios in Echo Park, California.

== Track listings ==
=== 1980 LP release ===
All tracks are written by Chris Desjardins, except where noted.

Side A
No.	Title	Lyrics	Music	Length
1.	"Sleeping Sickness"		Stan Ridgway	1:42
2.	"Jesus Don't Come Through the Cotton"	Judith Bell, Fredo Sutton		0:54
3.	"Police Gun Jitters"			1:34
4.	"Dynamite Hemorrhage"		Stan Ridgway	1:33
5.	"Ten Inch Razor"		John Curry, Scott Lasken	2:06
6.	"Kiss on My Cheek" (spoken word)			0:13
7.	"Suicide Saddle"			1:49

Side B
No.	Title	Music	Length
1.	"Cry Baby Killer"		4:16
2.	"Dominoes"		1:54
3.	"Crazy Boy"	Joe Ramirez	2:09
4.	"The Child Comes First"		1:16
5.	"Home of the Brave"		1:07
6.	"Impossible Crime"		1:50
7.	"No Questions Asked"	Stan Ridgway	1:57
Total length:			24:20

=== 2004 remastered CD edition ===
The extended version contained 10 bonus tracks: 15 to 17 were originally released as part of the 1979 Tooth and Nail compilation, 18 to 21 were originally released in 1978 as the four-song EP Flesh Eaters, and 22 to 24 are previously unreleased material.

All tracks are written by Desjardins, except where noted.

No.	Title	Lyrics	Music	Length
1.	"Sleeping Sickness"		Stan Ridgeway	1:42
2.	"Jesus Don't Come Through the Cotton"	Judith Bell, Fredo Sutton		0:54
3.	"Police Gun Jitters"			1:36
4.	"Dynamite Hemorrhage"		Stan Ridgeway	1:32
5.	"Ten Inch Razor"		John Curry, Scott Lasken	2:09
6.	"Kiss on My Cheek" (spoken word)			0:14
7.	"Suicide Saddle"			1:50
8.	"Cry Baby Killer"			4:20
9.	"Dominoes"			1:56
10.	"Crazy Boy"		Joe Ramirez	2:10
11.	"The Child Comes First"			1:17
12.	"Home of the Brave"			1:08
13.	"Impossible Crime"			1:50
14.	"No Questions Asked"		Stan Ridgeway	1:57

Bonus tracks
No.	Title	Music	Length
15.	"Word Goes Flesh"	John Doe, Pat Garrett, Don Bonebrake	2:30
16.	"Pony Dress"		2:20
17.	"Version Nation"		1:53
18.	"Disintegration Nation"		1:53
19.	"Agony Shorthand"	Ramirez	2:00
20.	"Radio Dies Screaming"	Curry, Lasken	2:09
21.	"Twisted Road"		1:34
22.	"Disintegration Nation" (demo version)		1:55
23.	"Agony Shorthand" (demo version)		1:53
24.	"Twisted Road" (demo version)		1:32
Total length:			44:14

== Personnel ==
The Flesh Eaters

- Chris Desjardins (best known as Chris D.) – Vocals
- Joe Ramirez – Guitar
- Pat Garrett – Guitar (track B1)
- John Richey – Bass (A1, A3 to A5, B2 to B5, B7)
- John Doe – Bass (A2, A7, B1, B6)
- Karla "Maddog" Barrett – Drums (A1, A3 to A5, B2)
- Don Bonebrake – Drums (A2, A7, B1, B6)
- Joe Nanini – Drums (B3 to B5, B7)
- Judith Bell (credited as V) – Backing vocals (A2, A4, A5, B6, B7)
- Exene Cervenka – Bracelets and 8 ball

2004 bonus tracks personnel

- Chris Desjardins – Vocals
- Pat Garrett – Guitar (15, 16)
- John Doe – Bass (15, 16)
- Don Bonebrake – Drums (15, 16)
- Exene Cervenka – Backing vocals (15, 16)
- John Curry – Guitar (17 to 21)
- Scott Lasken – Bass (17 to 21)
- Dennis Walsh – Drums (17 to 21)
- Judith Bell (credited as V) – Backing vocals (17)
- Tito Larriva – Guitar (22 to 24)
- John Richey – Bass (22 to 24)
- Joe Nanini – Drums (22 to 24)

Production

- Randolph J. Stevens – Executive in charge of production
- Chris Desjardins – Production, graphic design (front cover)
- Judith Bell – Graphic design (back cover, disc labels)
- Larry Duhart – Engineering (Note: At Program Recorders Studios in Hollywood, California.)
- Zamp – Engineering (Note: At Mental Ward Studios.)
- Larry Boden – Mastering

Additional production (2004 CD edition)

- Chris Desjardins – Co-production (15, 16), remixing (17), mixing (22 to 24) (Note: At Catasonic Studios in Echo Park, California.)
- Judith Bell – Co-production (15, 16)
- Zamp – Engineering (15, 16)
- Randy Stodola – Co-production (17 to 21), production (22 to 24), engineering (17 to 24) (Note: At Alleycat House, Stodola's four-track home studio.)
- Flesheaters – Co-production (17 to 21)
- Mark Wheaton – Mastering
- Byron Coley – Liner notes
