= Film Songs =

EP by Stan Ridgway
- Released: 1997
- Genre: Alternative rock
- Length: 31:29
- Label: TWA
- Producer: Stan Ridgway

Stan Ridgway chronology
Black Diamond (1996)	Film Songs (1997)	The Way I Feel Today (1998)

Professional ratings
Review scores
Source	Rating
AllMusic	3/5 stars

Film Songs is an EP by American singer-songwriter Stan Ridgway. It was released on January 20, 1996, by TWA Records and comprises songs Ridgway composed for various films and two live performance tracks.

== Track listing ==
All tracks are written by Stan Ridgway.

No.	Title	Length
1.	"Susie Before Sunrise"	4:04
2.	"Deep Inside We're Blue"	4:34
3.	"Bing Can't Walk ('Cause Bob Broke Both His Legs)"	5:10
4.	"End of the Line"	5:53
5.	"Floundering"	3:11
6.	"Talk Hard" (live)	3:38
7.	"I Wanna Be a Boss" (live)	4:59

== Personnel ==
Adapted from the Film Songs liner notes.

Musicians

- Joseph Berardi – drums, percussion
- Stan Ridgway – lead vocals, acoustic guitar, harmonica, production (1–6)
- Mark Schulz – electric guitar, backing vocals
- David Sutton – electric bass, acoustic bass, backing vocals
- Pietra Wexstun – keyboards, backing vocals

Production and additional personnel

- Mitchell Froom – production (7)
- John Gillingham – recording (6, 7)
- Shelley Roye – cover art, design
- Doug Schwartz – mastering

== Release history ==
Region	Date	Label	Format	Catalog
Australia	1997	TWA	CD	TWAE022

== Actual film songs ==
Film songs includes mostly actual film music but is not a compilation of Ridgway's complete works for films at the time.

"End of the Line" features on the soundtrack of the 1987 production Terminus and was released as a single in Europe that year, as Ridgway recalls.
