= Blood (Stan Ridgway and Pietra Wexstun album) =

Studio album by Stan Ridgway and Pietra Wexstun
- Released: September 23, 2003
- Recorded: Impala Studios, Venice, Los Angeles, California
- Genre: Ambient
- Length: 53:59
- Label: A440, Sympathy for the Record Industry
- Producer: Stan Ridgway, Pietra Wexstun

Stan Ridgway chronology
Holiday in Dirt (2002)	Blood (2003)	Snakebite (2004)

Professional ratings
Review scores
Source	Rating
Allmusic	3/5 stars

Blood is a collaborative album by American singer-songwriter Stan Ridgway and electronic musician Pietra Wexstun. It was released on September 23, 2003 by Sympathy for the Record Industry and A440 Records.

== Track listing ==
All music is composed by Stan Ridgway and Pietra Wexstun.

No.	Title	Length
1.	"Entrance"	5:50
2.	"Drips"	2:59
3.	"Baptism of Jajo"	4:49
4.	"Wound"	4:53
5.	"40"	3:01
6.	"Fountain"	2:42
7.	"Rose"	3:08
8.	"Lincoln's Head"	3:59
9.	"Manus Christi"	2:02
10.	"The Cloven Bunny"	2:00
11.	"Night Visit"	6:21
12.	"Weeping"	2:20
13.	"Blood Suite in Four Movements"	6:27
14.	"Exit"	3:28

== Personnel ==
Adapted from the Blood liner notes.

Musicians

- Alvin Fike – brass
- Stan Ridgway – guitar, harmonica, Prophet-5 synthesizer, Chamberlin keyboard, sampler, production
- Laslo Vickers – cello, contrabass, violin
- Pietra Wexstun – piano, organ, mellotron, Juno 106 synthesizer, autoharp, sampler, voice, production

Production and additional personnel

- Bob Demaa – mastering
- Brian Jackson – design, art direction
- Sean P. Riley – executive production
- Mark Ryden – design, art direction

== Release history ==
Region	Date	Label	Format	Catalog
United States	2003	A440	CD	0001
United States	2003	Sympathy for the Record Industry	CD	SFTRI 732
