= Tooth and Nail (various artists album) =

Compilation album by various artists
- Released: Mid-1979
- Studio: Program Recorders; Mental Ward
- Genre: Punk rock; proto-hardcore
- Length: 35:41
- Language: English
- Label: Upsetter
- Producer: Chris Desjardins; Judith Bell

Tooth and Nail is a seminal compilation album featuring six early Californian punk rock bands: the Controllers, the Flesh Eaters, U.X.A., Negative Trend, Middle Class, and the Germs.

== Production ==
Except for Negative Trend and the Germs, all bands on Tooth and Nail were co-produced by the Flesh Eaters frontman Chris Desjardins and Judith Bell.

The Controllers, U.X.A., Middle Class, and the Germs were recorded at Program Recorders Studios in Hollywood, California. The Flesh Eaters' songs "The Word Goes Flesh" and "Pony Dress" were recorded at Mental Ward Studios.

With the exceptions of "Version Nation", "Mercenaries" and "I Got Power", all tracks were mixed by Michael Hamilton at Kitchen Sync Studios in Hollywood. "Version Nation" is Desjardins' remixed version of his song "Disintegration Nation", originally produced and engineered by Randy Stodola at Alleycat House (Note: Stodola's four-track home studio.) for the 7-inch EP Flesh Eaters (Note: Upsetter #UPSET 8) (Note: At the time of their debut release, the Flesh Eaters consisted solely of their founder, Chris Desjardins (pka Chris D.), backed by the members of the pioneering punk rock band the Flyboys; who by that time had become a power trio because of the death of David Wilson (aka David Way) in a car accident in early 1978.) released in 1978; whereas "Mercenaries" and "I Got Power" (Note: Overdubbed with new vocals by Rik L Rik.) are Desjardins and Rik L Rik's remixes (Note: Done at Media Art Studio in Hermosa Beach, California.) of demo recordings done by the third lineup of Negative Trend in November 1978, in a session produced by Robbie Fields from Posh Boy Records at Media Art Studio in Hermosa Beach, California.

Tooth and Nail was mastered by Larry Boden in May 1979 at MCA Whitney Recording Studios in Glendale, California. (Note: The mastering company and engineer, and the date of production, uncredited on the cover art, can be identified via the run-out groove etchings onto the original vinyl pressings, which reads as follows: "UP-J-1 MCA/LB" (first pressing's side A), and "WR-C-2 MCA/LB 5-29-79 ♡" (side B).)

== Release ==
Featuring only previously unreleased material, Tooth and Nail was originally issued in mid-1979 on Upsetter Records, in 12-inch LP format. (Note: Upsetter #UP WR 1&2) The record was also the debut release for U.X.A.

== Reissues ==
In 1989, 10 years after its debut, Upsetter repressed Tooth and Nail. Since then, the album has remained out of print, although most of its tracks were later re-released separately.

The Controllers' songs were included on their eponymous compilation, (Note: Bacchus Archives #BA1148) released in 2000 on Bacchus Archives, a sublabel of Dionysus Records.

In 2004, the Flesh Eaters' three contributions to the album were re-released as bonus tracks on the Atavistic Records' remastered CD reissue (Note: Atavistic #ALP143CD) of their first studio album No Questions Asked, (Note: Upsetter #UPCJ 34) originally released in 1980 on Upsetter.

Middle Class' "Love Is Just a Tool" and "Above Suspicion" were featured on their compilation album A Blueprint for Joy: 1978-1980, (Note: Velvetone #VLT 002) issued on CD by Velvetone Records in 1995. They were also included on their early recordings collection Out of Vogue: The Early Material, released on vinyl (Note: Frontier #31078-1) and CD (Note: Frontier #31078-1) by Frontier Records in 2008. "Archetype", an outtake from the Tooth and Nail recording sessions, was featured on both compilations.

In November 2011, Posh Boy issued the two Negative Trend tracks on Tooth and Nail, along with their five cuts, credited to Rik L Rik, on the compilation album Beach Blvd, as a downloadable digital collection titled November 1978.

== Re-recordings ==
The Flesh Eaters' "Pony Dress" was re-recorded for the 1982 punk rock compilation American Youth Report, (Note: Invasion #INV-1) a vinyl LP issued on Invasion Records, a sublabel of Bomp! Records.

A shorter version of U.X.A.'s eponymous song was recorded for their first album, Illusions of Grandeur, (Note: A 10-track version of Illusions of Grandeur, mixed by Alec Murphy, was put in circulation as a pre-release (without any cover art) in 1980. It was replaced, the following year, by the definitive 12-track edition mixed by David Hines (keeping the same catalog number).) released by Posh Boy Records in 1981, on vinyl (Note: Posh Boy #PBS 104) and cassette tape; (Note: Posh Boy #PBC 104) while their song "Social Circle" was re-recorded by a reformed U.X.A., still fronted by De De Troit, for their album Tree Punks at Real School, (Note: Payola #CD-001) issued on CD by the Belgian label Payola Records in 1997.

The three Germs songs on Tooth and Nail are early versions of the best known tracks of the same titles featured on (GI), (Note: Slash #SR-103) the band's first and only studio album, released later in the same year.

== Track listing ==
Where it is necessary, songwriting credits are listed in the format lyrics/music.

Side A
No.	Title	Writer(s)	Artist	Length
1.	"Another Day"	Kidd Spike/Mad Dog, Spike, Stingray	The Controllers	2:23
2.	"Electric Church"	Spike/Mad Dog, Spike, Stingray	The Controllers	3:07
3.	"Jezebel" (Wayne Shanklin cover)	W. R. Shanklin	The Controllers	3:00
4.	"The Word Goes Flesh"	Desjardins/Bonebrake, Desjardins, Doe, Garrett	The Flesh Eaters	2:31
5.	"Pony Dress"	Chris Desjardins	The Flesh Eaters	2:20
6.	"Version Nation"	Desjardins	The Flesh Eaters	1:52
7.	"Social Circle"	De De Troit/Billy Southard	U.X.A.	2:40

Side B
No.	Title	Writer(s)	Artist	Length
1.	"U.X.A." (United Experiments of America)	Kowalski, Troit/Piscioneri	U.X.A.	3:11
2.	"I Got Power"	Rik L Rik/Craig Gray	Negative Trend	1:31
3.	"Mercenaries"	Will Shatter/Gray	Negative Trend	2:36
4.	"Love Is Just a Tool"	Middle Class	Middle Class	1:10
5.	"Above Suspicion"	Middle Class	Middle Class	3:21
6.	"Manimal" (early version)	Darby Crash/The Germs	Germs	2:15
7.	"Dragon Lady" (early version)	Crash/The Germs	Germs	1:48
8.	"Strange Notes" (early version)	Crash/The Germs	Germs	1:56
Total length:				35:41

== Personnel ==
The Controllers

- Kidd Spike – vocals, guitar
- Johnny Stingray – bass, backing vocals
- Karla Duplantier (aka Karla Barrett, pka Mad Dog) – drums, backing vocals

The Flesh Eaters

- Chris Desjardins (pka Chris D.) – vocals
- Pat Garrett – guitar (tracks A4, A5)
- John Doe – bass (A4, A5)
- Don Bonebrake – drums (A4, A5)
- Exene Cervenka – backing vocals (A4, A5)
- John Curry – guitar (A6)
- Scott Lasken – bass (A6)
- Dennis Walsh – drums (A6)
- Judith Bell (credited as V) – backing vocals (A6)

U.X.A.

- Denise Semiroux (pka De De Troit) – vocals
- Billy Southard – guitar
- Patrick O'Sullivan – bass
- Richie O'Connell – drums

Negative Trend

- Richard Elerick (pka Rik L Rik) – vocals
- Craig Gray – guitar, backing vocals
- Will Shatter – bass, backing vocals
- Tim Mooney – drums, backing vocals

Middle Class

- Jeff Atta – vocals
- Mike Atta – guitar
- Mike Patton – bass, backing vocals
- Bruce Atta – drums

Germs (credited as Germs (GI))

- Darby Crash – vocals
- Pat Smear – guitar
- Lorna Doom – bass
- Don Bolles – drums

Production

- Randolph J. Stevens – executive in charge of production
- Chris Desjardins – co-production (A1 to A5, A7, B1, B4, B5), graphic design (cover, graphics)
- Judith Bell – co-production (A1 to A5, A7, B1, B4, B5), graphic design (cover, graphics, disc labels)
- John Doe – co-production (B6 to B8)
- Germs – co-production (B6 to B8)
- Larry Duhart – engineering (A1 to A3, A7, B1, B6 to B8)
- Zamp – engineering (A4, A5, B4 to B8)
- Henry Blau – engineering (B4, B5)
- Michael Hamilton – mixing
- Larry Boden – mastering
- Exene Cervenka – graphic design (cover, graphics, disc labels)
- Mick Toohig – graphic design (advising)
- Steve Samiof – photography
- Tim Norman – typography (front cover)

Production for "Version Nation"

- Randy Stodola – co-production, engineering
- Flesheaters – co-production
- Chris Desjardins – remixing

Production for Negative Trend

- Robbie Fields – production
- Glen Lockett (pka Spot) – engineering
- Rolf Erickson – engineering
- Chris Desjardins – remixing
- Rik L Rik – remixing
