= I Used to Be Pretty =

Studio album by the Flesh Eaters
- Released: January 18, 2019
- Genres: Garage rock, punk rock
- Length: 58:35
- Label: Yep Roc
- Producer: The Flesh Eaters

The Flesh Eaters chronology
Miss Muerte (2004)	I Used to Be Pretty (2019)

Professional ratings
Aggregate scores
Source	Rating
Metacritic	78/100
Review scores
Source	Rating
AllMusic	4/5 stars
American Songwriter	4/5 stars
Blurt	5/5 stars
Paste	7.6/10

I Used to Be Pretty is a studio album by American band the Flesh Eaters. It was released on January 18, 2019, through Yep Roc Records.

== Track listing ==
No.	Title	Writer(s)	Length
1.	"Black Temptation"	Chris D., Dave Alvin	5:03
2.	"House Amid the Thickets"	Chris D., Robyn Jameson	5:47
3.	"My Life to Live"	Chris D., Chris Wahl, Don Kirk, Robyn Jameson	5:07
4.	"The Green Manalishi"	Peter Green	4:34
5.	"Miss Muerte"	Chris D.	4:28
6.	"The Youngest Profession"	Chris D., Wayne James	6:40
7.	"Cinderella"	Gerry Roslie	3:48
8.	"Pony Dress"	Chris D.	2:29
9.	"The Wedding Dice"	Chris D.	4:29
10.	"She's Like Heroin to Me"	Jeffrey Lee Pierce	2:53
11.	"Ghost Cave Lament"	Chris D., Dave Alvin	13:17

== Personnel ==
- Chris D. - lead vocals
- Dave Alvin - guitar
- John Doe - bass
- Bill Bateman - drums
- D.J. Bonebrake - marimba, percussion
- Steve Berlin - saxophone
- Julie Christensen - backing vocals
