= No Questions Asked =

No Questions Asked may refer to:

- No Questions Asked (film), a 1951 film directed by Harold Kress
- "No Questions Asked" (How I Met Your Mother), a 2013 episode of the television series How I Met Your Mother
- "No Questions Asked" (Dead Zone), an episode of the television series The Dead Zone
- "No Questions Asked" (song), a 1988 song by the band Fleetwood Mac
- No Questions Asked (album), an album by the Flesh Eaters
