= Chris D. =

American singer, director and writer

- Born: Chris Desjardins; January 15, 1953 (age 73); Riverside, California, U.S.
- Education: Master's degree in film
- Alma mater: Loyola Marymount University
- Occupations: Musician, songwriter, producer, writer, actor, director, film programmer, history professor
- Years active: 1977–present
- Notable work: I Pass for Human
- Spouse: Julie Christensen (before 1988)
- Musical career
- Origin: Los Angeles, California, U.S.
- Genres: Punk rock, death rock
- Instrument: Singing
- Labels: Slash, Ruby, Enigma, New Rose, Upsetter, Invasion/Bomp, Zippo/Demon, Expanded, Dog Meat, Sympathy for the Record Industry, Atavistic, SST, Shakeytown Music/BMI
- Writing career
- Period: 2005–2009
- Genres: Poetry, fiction, non-fiction
- Subject: Japanese film history

Chris D. (born Chris Desjardins; January 15, 1953) is an American punk poet, singer, writer, rock critic, producer, and filmmaker. He is best known as the lead singer and founder of the early and long-running Los Angeles punk/death rock band the Flesh Eaters.

== Music (as performer) ==
=== Flesh Eaters ===
Desjardins was a feature writer at Slash magazine in 1977, when he formed the Flesh Eaters with several friends from the Los Angeles punk scene, including Tito Larriva. Their second album, A Minute to Pray, a Second to Die, recorded and released in 1981, featured John Doe and DJ Bonebrake from X, as well as Dave Alvin, Bill Bateman, and Steve Berlin from The Blasters. The band recorded two further albums; Forever Came Today (1982) and A Hard Road to Follow (1983) with Don Kirk on guitar, Robyn Jameson on bass and Chris Wahl on drums, Chris D. on vocals and occasionally Jill Jordan on backing vocals.

The Flesh Eaters were a staple of the L.A. punk scene in the 1980s. The band played alongside seminal bands like The Misfits and The Meat Puppets. A number of original Flesh Eaters releases, like River of Fever, were recorded through Shakeytown Music/BMI. Others were produced by Upsetter, Invasion/Bomp, Zippo/Demon or SST.

From 1989 to 1993 and from 1997 to 2000, Desjardins performed live with varying line-ups of The Flesh Eaters. During the first of these periods, three more albums came out on SST Records: Dragstrip Riot (1991), Sex Diary of Mr. Vampire (1992), and Crucified Lovers in Woman Hell (EP - 1993).Two additional albums, Ashes of Time (1999) and Miss Muerte (2004), were released.

In early 2006, to mark the 25th anniversary of A Minute to Pray, a Second to Die, Desjardins performed three shows in California and one in London, with Doe, Bonebrake, Alvin, Bateman, and Berlin. This Flesh Eaters lineup had not performed together since 1981.They reunited briefly in 2015 for a five-show tour and again for an eight-show run in 2018. They issued a new album, I Used to Be Pretty, in 2019.

=== Divine Horsemen ===
Desjardins was the co-leader, with then-spouse Julie Christensen, of the Divine Horsemen between 1984 and 1988. More than three decades later, Divine Horsemen reformed. A new album called Hot Rise of an Ice Cream Phoenix was released in 2021.

=== Solo and other works ===
Desjardins issued a solo semi-acoustic LP on America's Enigma Records and the French New Rose label, titled Time Stands Still by Chris D./Divine Horseman in 1984. The album was later released in Australia by Dog Meat Records of Melbourne. It features guest musicians John Doe, Jeffrey Lee Pierce, Linda "Texacala" Jones, and Dave Alvin.

Desjardins issued a second solo album titled I Pass for Human as "Stone By Stone" following the end of his marriage to Julie Christensen.

He released a further solo album Love Cannot Die through the Sympathy for the Record Industry label in 1995.

== Music (as producer and in other roles) ==
Chris D. worked as an A&R and in-house producer for Slash and Ruby Records from 1980 until early 1984. He produced all the Flesh Eaters' albums and co-produced The Gun Club's debut album, Fire of Love, with Tito Larriva in 1982. Desjardins produced the debut albums of The Dream Syndicate (The Days of Wine and Roses), Green On Red (Gravity Talks) and The Lazy Cowgirls. He remixed The Misfits' LP Walk Among Us with Glenn Danzig and the Germs' What We Do Is Secret (EP) with Pat Smear.

=== Upsetter Records ===
Upsetter Records
- Founded: 1978
- Founder: Chris Desjardins; Judith Bell
- Genre: Punk rock; hardcore punk; deathrock; garage punk; punk blues; alternative rock
- Country of origin: United States
- Location: Los Angeles, California

Upsetter Records was a Los Angeles, California-based record label founded in 1978 by Chris D. and his then-girlfriend, the animation and graphic artist Judith Bell.

Named in tribute to Lee "Scratch" Perry and the dub reggae, popular with the early punks, Upsetter was specifically created to release the early discography of the Flesh Eaters, The only exception in the label's catalog is the seminal Tooth and Nail compilation released in 1979, an album full of outstanding early Californian punk rock from the Controllers, Middle Class, the Germs, U.X.A., Negative Trend, and the Flesh Eaters themselves.

In parallel with their record label, Desjardins and Bell, in collaboration with Exene Cervenka, published the short-lived punk zine The Upsetter.

== Writer ==
=== Magazines, etc. ===
Desjardins wrote for Slash, Forced Exposure, Asian Trash Cinema and Cult Movies.

He also wrote liner notes and audio commentary tracks for DVDs of a variety of classic Japanese genre films, Italian cult and arthouse films.

=== Non-fiction ===
In 2005, Desjardins' tribute to fringe directors of Japanese cult, action and exploitation cinema of the period 1950 to 1980, was published by I.B. Tauris, entitled Outlaw Masters of Japanese Film.

Desjardins spent almost 20 years researching and compiling an encyclopedia of Japanese yakuza films. Titled Gun and Sword: An Encyclopedia of Japanese Gangster Films 1955-1980, research for the book was partly funded by the Japan Foundation Artist Fellowship. This work was published by Poison Fang Press in April 2013.

=== Fiction ===
- No Evil Star
- Dragon Wheel Splendor & Other Love Stories of Violence and Dread
- Shallow Water
- Mother's Worry

All were published in 2012.

=== Anthologies ===
Illiterati Press published Double Snake Bourbon, a 139-page collection of Desjardins' poetry, lyrics, and prose.

A Minute to Pray, A Second to Die, a 500-page anthology of Chris D.'s written work, was published at the end of 2009.

Writing for Slash: 1977-1981 - The Know-It-All Years, a collection of reviews, was issued in 2022.

== Film ==
Desjardins has acted in a number of films, both independent and big budget. In 1987, he had a small role in the Orion film No Way Out alongside Kevin Costner and Gene Hackman as an assassin. The same year, Desjardins appeared in Border Radio, an independent film that was later released as part of the Criterion Collection, as a musician who struggles with the consequences of a robbery.

In 2002, Desjardins wrote and directed his first feature film, I Pass For Human, which was produced and edited by Lynne Margulies. It was released in theaters in March 2004 and on DVD in October 2006. Desjardins had been attempting to produce the film since the 1980s under the original title "Hell's Belle".

He worked in the programming department of the American Cinematheque in Los Angeles from 1999, and was a programmer there from January 2006 until August 1, 2009.

He teaches film studies in California and also provided DVD commentary for several films.

== Personal life ==
Desjardins was married to Julie Christensen. The pair divorced in 1988. Following the divorce, Desjardins sought help for drug and alcohol problems in a 12-step program.
