= Dragstrip Riot (album) =

Studio album by the Flesh Eaters
- Released: 1991
- Genre: Punk rock
- Label: SST
- Producer: Chris D.

The Flesh Eaters chronology
Prehistoric Fits Vol. 2 (1990)	Dragstrip Riot (1991)	Sex Diary of Mr. Vampire (1992)

Dragstrip Riot is an album by the American band the Flesh Eaters, released in 1991. It was their first studio album since 1983's A Hard Road to Follow. They supported the album with a North American tour.

Lyrics to "Dragstrip Riot" appear in Bruce Harris Craven's novel Fast Sofa, published in 1993. The Flesh Eaters recorded a new song to promote the book, which was included with Fast Sofa as a flexi-disc. "The Youngest Profession" was rerecorded for 2018's I Used to Be Pretty.

== Production ==
The album was made with a new lineup of the band, with Chris D. the only longtime member. It contains covers of the Flamin' Groovies' "Slow Death" and Mott the Hoople's "Moon Upstairs". The title track stretches to almost 10 minutes.

== Critical reception ==
Professional ratings
Review scores
Source	Rating
AllMusic	3/5 stars
The Encyclopedia of Popular Music	2/5 stars
Spin Alternative Record Guide	5/10

Trouser Press concluded that the new band "proves potent enough to keep pace without clinging to their leader’s tornado-swept coattails, whether the context is quietly malicious delta blues ('The Youngest Profession'), Alice Cooper-via-Jim Thompson power-metal ('Sugarhead and Panther Breath') or stripped-down docudrama (the ten-minute title track), not to mention a handful of territory-defining covers." The Los Angeles Times called the new Flesh Eaters "a more tempered band with a blues and garage-rock sound that sometimes echoes such punk precursors as the Stooges, Television and the Patti Smith Group... Formerly a ranter and raver, Chris D. now can sing when he wants to."

The Arizona Daily Star wrote that "lead screamer Chris D. has reassembled his semi-legendary L.A. punk band, rediscovered the blues and now occasionally forgoes his trademark from-the-crypt wail to actually sing his lyrics, a combination of beat poetry, pulp fiction and B-movie themes." CMJ New Music Report thought that guitarist Wayne James's "every move is a new extension of L.A.M.F./Link Wray squint-eyed grace; his guitar/co-writing skills are within the bounds of both old Flesh Eaters style and stereotype bad-ass rocker blare."

AllMusic determined: "Overlong, but after over a decade they're in great shape." The Encyclopedia of Popular Music thought that the album "saw the band crashing out riotous swamp rock of a virulent, Cramps-type character."

== Track listing ==
No.	Title	Length
1.	"Tomorrow Never Comes"
2.	"Youngest Profession"
3.	"Soul Kiss"
4.	"Dragstrip Riot"
5.	"Bedfull of Knives"
6.	"My Baby's Done Her Best"
7.	"Sugarhead and Panther Breath"
8.	"Out of Nowhere"
9.	"Dove's Blood Ink"
10.	"Take My Hand"
11.	"Agony Shorthand"
12.	"Agony Sorehead"
13.	"Buried Treasure"
14.	"Moon Upstairs"
15.	"Slipped, Tripped, Fell in Love"
16.	"Slow Death"
17.	"Fur Magnet"
