= Mr. Trouble =

Studio album by Stan Ridgway
- Released: September 18, 2012
- Genre: Rock
- Length: 44:45
- Label: A440
- Producer: Stan Ridgway, Pietra Wexstun, Bruce Zelesnik

Stan Ridgway chronology
Neon Mirage (2010)	Mr. Trouble (2012)

Professional ratings
Review scores
Source	Rating
Allmusic	3.5/5 stars

Mr. Trouble is an album by Stan Ridgway, released on September 18, 2012 through A440 Music Group. The first six tracks are new recordings while the remaining songs are taken from Ridgway's performance on Mountain Stage in 2010.

== Track listing ==
All tracks are written by Stan Ridgway.

No.	Title	Length
1.	"The Drowning Man"	4:26
2.	"All Too Much"	6:11
3.	"Across the Border"	4:37
4.	"Mr. Trouble"	4:52
5.	"Gone Deep Underground"	3:37
6.	"We Never Close"	2:28
7.	"Afghan Forklift"	4:50
8.	"Turn a Blind Eye"	5:50
9.	"Stranded"	2:32
10.	"Camouflage"	4:09

== Personnel ==
- Stan Ridgway – vocals, acoustic guitar, harmonica, keyboards, producer
- Tommy Arizona – pedal steel guitar
- Bill Blatt – bass guitar
- Ralph Carney – saxophone, woodwind
- Enrico Deiro – accordion
- Ricky King – bass guitar, acoustic guitar, slide guitar
- Tim O'Brien – fiddle, violin
- Pollyanna Pierpoint – design
- Lazlo Vickers – violin
- Pietra Wexstun – Farfisa, keyboards, melodica, piano, vocals
- Bruce Zelesnik – drums, percussion, vibraphone, producer
