= Flesh Eaters (EP) =

Album by The Flesh Eaters

EP by the Flesh Eaters
- Released: 1978
- Recorded: Summer 1978
- Studio: Alleycat House
- Genre: Punk rock
- Length: 7:34
- Language: English
- Label: Upsetter
- Producer: Randy Stodola; Flesheaters

The Flesh Eaters chronology
Flesh Eaters (1978)	No Questions Asked (1980)

Flesh Eaters, also known as Disintegration Nation after the title of its opening track, is the four-song debut EP by American rock band the Flesh Eaters.

== Background ==
At the beginning of 1978, just a few months after being formed, the Flesh Eaters, in an early lineup composed of their founder, the singer and songwriter Chris Desjardins (pka Chris D.), guitarist Tito Larriva, bassist John Richey, and drummer Joe Nanini, went into a studio for their first time, with Randy Stodola of the Alley Cats as producer and engineer, to record early versions of the songs "Disintegration Nation", "Agony Shorthand", and "Twisted Road", which, as they were supposed to be demos only, remained unreleased until 2004, when they were featured as bonus tracks on the CD reissue (Note: Atavistic #ALP143CD) of No Questions Asked, the band's first full-length album originally released in 1980. (Note: Upsetter #UPCJ 34)

Shortly after, still in 1978, Chris D. would come back to Stodola's studio for a second session, this time backed by the members of the pioneering punk rock band the Flyboys, (Note: Who by that time had become a power trio because of the death of David Wilson (a.k.a. David Way) in a car accident in early 1978.) to record what would be the debut release of his band.

== Production and release ==
The Flesh Eaters EP, produced and engineered by Randy Stodola at Alleycat House, his four-track home studio, was released in 1978 on Upsetter Records, in 7-inch vinyl disc format. (Note: Upsetter #UPSET 8)

== Critical reception ==
In his biography of the Flesh Eaters for Perfect Sound Forever, Jay Hinman said that:

"... [The Flesh Eaters EP], with just a hint of the ferocity of the LPs to come, is full of jagged, blazing glory, with a touch of rockabilly adulation and an up-front, slashing guitar sound that laid down a subsequent trademark."

Trouser Press, for its part, commented:

"... to record the first Flesh Eaters EP", "[Chris] Desjardins ... borrowed an existing band – LA's flower-punk Flyboys —". "'Twas a wise choice: the trebly, hyperkinetic playing matches him lunge for lunge on four breathless numbers, including the well-beyond-Costello conflagration "Radio Dies Screaming.""

== Disintegration Nation EP ==
Disintegration Nation

EP by the Flesh Eaters
- Released: 2011
- Recorded: Early 1978
- Studio: Alleycat House
- Genre: Punk rock
- Language: English
- Label: TKO
- Producer: Randy Stodola

The Flesh Eaters chronology
Miss Muerte (2004)	Disintegration Nation (2011)

Disintegration Nation is an archival 7-inch EP featuring, for the first time on vinyl, and as a stand-alone release, the first studio recordings by the Flesh Eaters. It consists of demo versions of the songs "Disintegration Nation", "Agony Shorthand", and "Twisted Road", recorded at the beginning of 1978, just a few months after the band was formed, at the four-track home studio of Randy Stodola, who produced and engineered the session, with Chris D. on vocals, Tito Larriva on guitar, John Richey on Bass, and Joe Nanini on drums. The three songs would be re-recorded soon after, with revamped lineup, for the band's 1978 self-titled debut EP.

The Flesh Eaters's first ever studio session was first released in 2004, as bonus tracks, on the CD reissue of No Questions Asked, the band's 1980 first studio album.

The Disintegration Nation EP was released on July 15, 2011, on TKO Records, (Note: TKO #Round 183) as a limited edition of 500 copies, featuring cover art by Chris D.

=== Track listing ===
All tracks are written by Chris Desjardins, except where noted.

Side A
No.	Title	Length
1.	"Disintegration Nation"

Side B
No.	Title	Music	Length
1.	"Agony Shorthand"	Joe Ramirez
2.	"Twisted Road"

== Reissues ==
In 1979, a remixed version of "Disintegration Nation" was featured, retitled as "Version Nation", on the Tooth and Nail compilation album. (Note: Upsetter #UP WR 1&2)

In 1989, the Flesh Eaters EP was repressed featuring yellow disc labels instead of the original in white.

In 2004, the EP, in its entirety, was included as bonus tracks, on the Atavistic Records' remastered CD reissue of the band's first studio album, No Questions Asked, originally released in 1980 on Upsetter.

== Track listing ==
All tracks are written by Chris Desjardins, except where noted.

Side A
No.	Title	Music	Length
1.	"Disintegration Nation"		1:52
2.	"Agony Shorthand"	Joe Ramirez	2:01

Side B
No.	Title	Music	Length
1.	"Radio Dies Screaming"	John Curry, Scott Lasken	2:07
2.	"Twisted Road"		1:34
Total length:			7:34

== Personnel ==
The Flesh Eaters

- Chris Desjardins (a.k.a. Chris D.) – vocals
- John Curry – guitar
- Scott Lasken – bass
- Dennis Walsh – drums

Production

- Randy Stodola – co-production, engineering
- Flesheaters – co-production
- Chris Desjardins (credited as CD) – graphic design (front cover), photography (inner sleeve)
- Judith Bell – graphic design (disc labels), typography
- G Hitler – graphic design (disc labels), typography
- Richard Paulsen – illustration (back cover collage)
- Bonnie Ballistic – illustration (back cover drawing)
- J. Jennik – photography (inner sleeve)
- John Curry – photography (inner sleeve)
