= Songs That Made This Country Great =

Greatest hits album by Stan Ridgway
- Released: February 25, 1992
- Recorded: 1981–1991
- Genre: New wave
- Length: 70:36
- Label: I.R.S. Records
- Producer: Joe Chiccarelli, Stewart Copeland, [Phil Cul, Hugh Jones, Richard Mazda, Bill Noland, Stan Ridgway, Louis VanderBerg, Hal Willner

Stan Ridgway chronology
Partyball (1991)	Songs That Made This Country Great (1992)	Black Diamond (1996)

Professional ratings
Review scores
Source	Rating
AllMusic	4.5/5 stars
Q	3/5 stars

Songs That Made This Country Great is a compilation album by the American new wave artist Stan Ridgway, with songs spanning from his time with Wall of Voodoo to his third album, Partyball. It was released on February 25, 1992, through I.R.S. Records.

== Track listing ==
1. "Salesman" – 5:26
  - Originally from The Big Heat.
2. "Lonely Town" – 4:09
  - Originally from Mosquitos.
3. "Drive, She Said" – 4:23
  - Originally from The Big Heat.
4. "Don't Box Me In" – 4:36
  - Originally from the Rumble Fish Soundtrack.
5. "Can't Complain" – 3:49
  - Originally from Mosquitos.
6. "Goin' Southbound" – 4:42
  - Originally from Mosquitos.
7. "Ring of Fire (Single Edit)" – 3:44
  - Originally from The Index Masters.
8. "Camouflage (Single Remix Edit)" – 4:59
  - Originally from The Big Heat.
9. "The Overlords" – 4:59
  - Originally from Partyball.
10. "Lost Weekend" – 5:00
  - Originally from Call of the West.
11. "Cannon Song (a.k.a. Army Song)" – 2:17
  - Originally from The Threepenny Opera, released on Lost in the Stars: The Music of Kurt Weill.
12. "The Big Heat" – 4:30
  - Originally from The Big Heat.
13. "Peg and Pete and Me" – 4:41
  - Originally from Mosquitos.
14. "Mexican Radio (Edit)" – 3:56
  - Originally from Call of the West.
15. "I Wanna Be a Boss" – 4:52
  - Originally from Partyball.
16. "Walkin' Home Alone" – 4:33
  - Originally from The Big Heat.
