= I Pass for Human =

- Directed by: Chris D.
- Written by: Chris D.
- Screenplay by: Chris D.
- Produced by: Lynne Margulies; Richard Foos (Executive)
- Starring: Eleanor Whitledge; Josh Coxx; Eva Scott; Jennifer Ciesar; E. Shepherd Stevenson; Mary Woronov; John Diehl; Bryan Small; Texas Terri Laird; Iris Berry
- Cinematography: Brian O'Connell
- Edited by: Lynne Marguiles
- Music by: Danny Carey; E. Shepherd Stevenson
- Production company: Poison Fang Productions
- Distributed by: Ryko Distribution (Domestic); Arcanum Entertainment (DVD)
- Release date: March 21, 2004
- Running time: 102 Minutes
- Country: United States
- Language: English
- Budget: $35,000 (Estimated)

I Pass for Human is a 2004 independent horror film written and directed by Chris Desjardin (often referred to as simply "Chris D."). I Pass for Human was Chris D.'s directorial debut. The film was released theatrically at the San Francisco Horror Festival on March 21, 2004 and was released to DVD in late 2006.

== Plot ==
I Pass for Human follows the downward spiral of Jane (Eleanor Whitledge) following the heroin overdose and death of her boyfriend, Dax (Bryan Small). Jane soon finds herself using heroin herself to cope with the pain of mourning, as well as the shock of haunting visions of Dax following her. Finding heroin alone inadequate, in short order she replaces Dax with the company of new beau Rick (Josh Coxx). Not only is Rick a heroin addict, but he also has a dead significant other, Azami, whose jealousy apparently follows him from beyond the grave. The film plays on the conceit that heroin addicts escape death; in I Pass for Human, heroin leaves its users never quite dead, yet never quite alive.

== Reception ==
I Pass for Human's independent release and distribution has left its audience limited. Reviews have been mixed. Mainstream critics, in this case from Variety Magazine and Joblo Media, were impressed by the film's special effects and acting but felt the narrative was wanting. Independent reviewers such as DVD Verdict were more supportive, declaring I Pass for Human "works quite nicely".
