= Goin' Southbound =

Single by Stan Ridgway

from the album Mosquitos
- B-side: "Newspapers"
- Released: 1989
- Recorded: Capitol Studios, Impala Studios and Knobworld, CA
- Genre: New wave, alternative rock
- Length: 4:23
- Label: Geffen Records
- Songwriter: Stan Ridgway
- Producers: Joe Chiccarelli, Stan Ridgway

Stan Ridgway singles chronology
"Camouflage" (1986)	"Goin' Southbound" (1989)	"Calling Out to Carol" (1989)

"Goin' Southbound" is a song by American singer-songwriter Stan Ridgway and is the first single released in support of his 1989 album Mosquitos.

== Formats and track listing ==
All songs written by Stan Ridgway

European 7" single (060 24 1026 6)

1. "Goin' Southbound" – 4:43
2. "Newspapers" – 2:42

Australian 7" single (102088–7)

1. "Goin' Southbound" – 4:43
2. "Peg and Pete and Me" – 2:42

== Charts ==
Chart (1989)	Peak position
U.S. Billboard Modern Rock Tracks	8
