= Julie Christensen =

American singer-songwriter (born 1956)

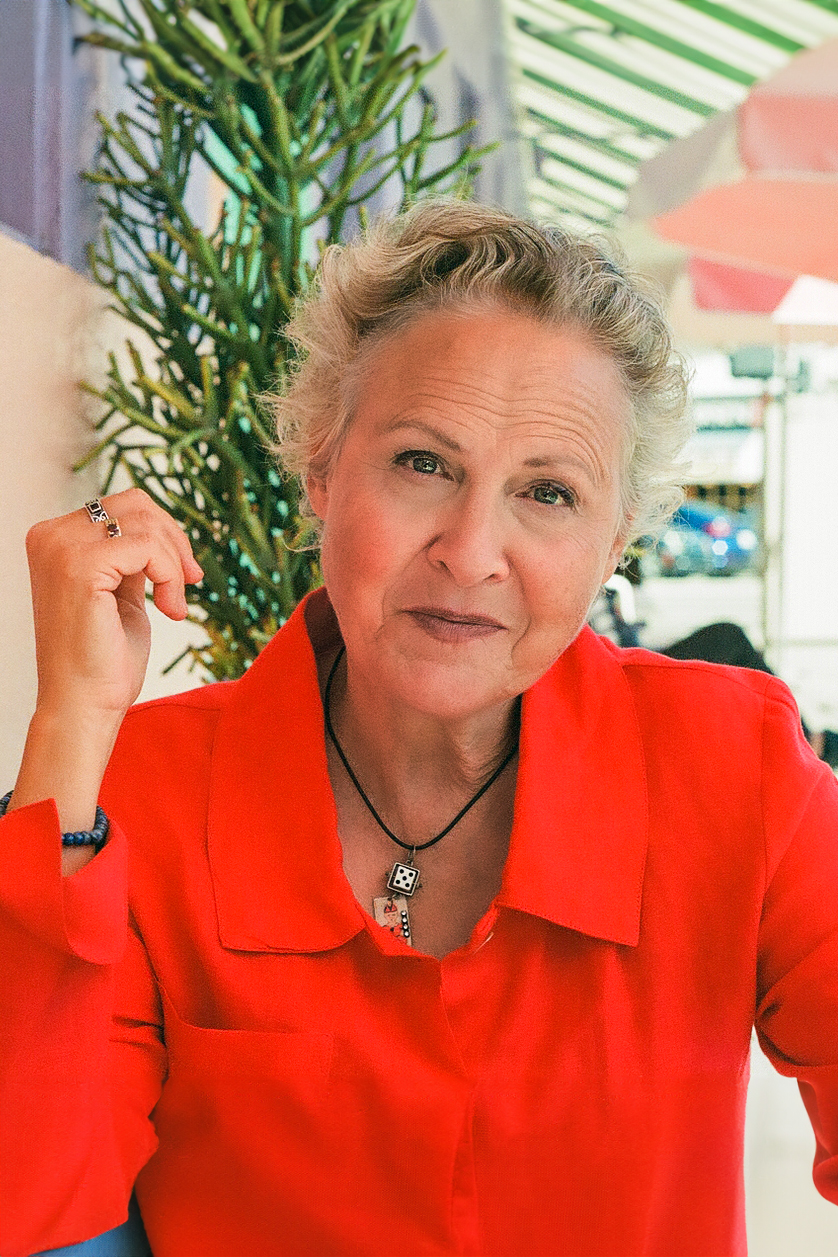
- Christensen in 2023

Background information
- Born: January 21, 1956 (age 70); Iowa City, Iowa, U.S.
- Genres: Rock; alt-country; roots; jazz
- Occupation: Singer-songwriter
- Instruments: Vocals; guitar
- Years active: 1976–present
- Member of: Divine Horsemen
- Website: stonecupid.com

Julie Christensen (born January 21, 1956) is an American singer and songwriter. Noted for its versatility, Christensen's music has been praised by critics. As a solo artist, Christensen has released nine albums as of 2023.

Christensen, a founding member of the Divine Horsemen, toured extensively with Leonard Cohen. She has performed or recorded with artists including Todd Rundgren, Iggy Pop, Public Image Ltd, Van Dyke Parks, John Doe, Exene Cervenka, and k.d. lang.

== Early life ==
Christensen was born in Iowa City and grew up in Newton, Iowa. Her father was a pharmacist and her mother, a nurse, played the organ at local Protestant churches. Julie grew up in that generation between Boomer and Gen-X (some call it “Generation Jones.”) Her mom and she would sit at the piano and play and sing through the Judy Collins songbook, which of course had several Leonard Cohen songs in it. She would listen to Iowa Public Radio, WLS in Chicago, WHO in Des Moines, and an FM station out of Little Rock. The oldest of four children, Christensen has three brothers, who were also musicians. Two of her brothers played together in a band, Jonesin', that was inducted into the Iowa Rock and Roll Hall of Fame in 2013. Julie was inducted herself in 2018.

A lyric soprano, Christensen began singing while she was a child. She performed at churches, and when she was 11, she appeared on the first of two television talent contests. In high school, she learned French, and after she graduated, she enrolled at the University of Iowa. She planned to learn Chinese, and majored in Asian studies.

== Career ==
=== Early career, the Divine Horsemen ===
During her first year at the University of Iowa, Christensen joined Longshot, a country-rock band; to tour with them, she dropped out of college. In 1978, she began singing with a show band, and after a year on the road, she moved to Austin, Texas. In Austin, she performed frequently with jazz artists, including bassist and producer Roscoe Beck of the group Passenger, who would later introduce Christensen to Leonard Cohen.

In 1981, Christensen moved to Los Angeles. While still performing from time to time with jazz groups, she began to sing with the underground bands of the early Los Angeles punk scene. In 1982, while sitting in with Top Jimmy & the Rhythm Pigs, she met Chris D., a producer and the founder of the seminal Los Angeles band, the Flesh Eaters. Impressed by her voice, he booked her as a backup vocalist for a Top Jimmy session he was producing. By 1984, Christensen and Chris D. had founded the Divine Horsemen; in 1985, they were married.

The Divine Horsemen's music combined elements of punk, rock, blues roots, and country. A reviewer for roots-music magazine No Depression said it "foreshadowed the alt-country genre." With a lineup that included members of X, the Blasters, the Gun Club, and Texacala Jones and Kid Congo, the band released their largely acoustic debut album, Time Stands Still, in late 1984. As a reviewer said in 2016, "Right up there with George Jones and Tammy Wynette, with Julie Christensen harmonizing circles around a despondent Chris D. The twin vocals wander, finish one another's sentences, fight, fuck, laugh, cry, and then join together in a gorgeously mismatched duo. Christensen's clear Emmylou-cry looms large."

The Divine Horsemen toured frequently and released three studio albums and two EPs between 1984 and 1987. Although they built a substantial following, their success was hampered by alcoholism and addiction within the band. Christensen struggled with a daily heroin habit; when she got clean in 1987, she left the band and ended her marriage.

More than three decades after the original Divine Horsemen dissolved, the band reformed. A new double LP album called Hot Rise of an Ice Cream Phoenix was released in 2021, followed by another double album called Bitter End of a Sweet Night in October 2023. Both were released by Larry Hardy on In the Red Records.

=== Leonard Cohen ===
Three months after she left the Divine Horsemen, she was approached by Roscoe Beck about working as a backup vocalist on an upcoming Leonard Cohen tour. Christensen excelled during her audition with Cohen's band—with her mother on piano, she had sung Leonard Cohen songs since she was a child. Next, she met with Cohen. He pointed out over lunch that the tour would be grueling, and Christensen responded with stories regarding the years she had spent on tour with the Divine Horsemen, playing at venues such as CBGB and the Cathay de Grande. Cohen was reportedly charmed. Perla Batalla and she began a seven-month tour as back-up singers for Cohen in March 1988, and continued to tour with him off and on for the next six years.

In 2003, Came So Far for Beauty: An Evening of Leonard Cohen Songs was commissioned by the Celebrate Brooklyn Performing Arts Festival with support from the Canadian Consulate General New York. Christensen took part in several performances of Came So Far for Beauty, which were curated and produced by Hal Willner. In addition to singing with Lou Reed, Nick Cave, Antony, Teddy Thompson, Linda Thompson, Rufus Wainwright, Beth Orton, Laurie Anderson, and Kate and Anna McGarrigle, she sang "A Singer Must Die" in a duet with Perla Batalla on Anthem.

The documentary film Leonard Cohen: I'm Your Man was based on the 2005 Sydney performance of Came So Far for Beauty. Christensen was featured both in the film and on the accompanying soundtrack, released by Verve Forecast in 2006.

=== Solo career and Stone Cupid ===
In 1989, Christensen signed with Polygram Records. Todd Rundgren produced the album, which was slated to be her solo debut. "She was unlike a lot of female singers, who may be creative in their songwriting and write suitably for their own delivery, but don't really try a broad range of styles," Rundgren said. "It was her ability to sing with conviction in a variety of approaches that made her extraordinary to me." In 1990, Polygram was restructured, and the record was shelved and Christensen dropped from the label.

In 1991, Christensen was featured in the Barry Levinson-directed film Bugsy, credited as ‘Ciros singer’.

In 1994, Christensen (who had remarried and become a mother) moved from Los Angeles to Ojai, California, where she focused on songwriting and recording as a solo artist. Unable to retrieve the master recordings from the Polygram sessions, she re-recorded some of its material and released it along with several new songs on her solo debut, 1996's Love Is Driving. Her second solo album, Soul Driver came out in 2000, and in 2006 and 2007, she released Something Familiar and Where the Fireworks Are, two stylistically distinct records that she wrote and recorded simultaneously. Rather than using her own name, she sometimes performed and recorded using the name Stone Cupid.

With 2012's Weeds Like Us, Christensen returned to her folk-rock roots. The album had taken shape several years earlier as an acoustic project, which would be produced by Christensen's longtime friend and mentor, Kenny Edwards. Edwards died in 2010, succumbing to a blood clot that resulted from the chemotherapy treatment he was undergoing for cancer. Devastated by his loss, Christensen put the album on hold until 2012. Re-envisioned, it was produced by Jeff Turmes, best known for his work with Mavis Staples.

Christensen and her family relocated from Ojai to East Nashville, Tennessee, in 2013. In addition to performing as a solo artist, she played regularly with a band composed of guitarists Chris Tench and Sergio Webb, bassist Bones Hillman, and drummer Steve Latanation. They used the name Stone Cupid, and in January 2016, they released The Cardinal, co-produced by Christensen and Turmes.

Subsequent records with her Nashville band are 2018’s A Sad Clown and 2022’s 11 From Kevin - Songs of Kevin Gordon.

Christensen moved to Jemez Springs, New Mexico, in 2020, where she reconnected with bassist and composer Terry Lee Burns, a New Mexico native she had known for almost 40 years. Together, they produced The Price We Pay for Love, an all-ballads record, in 2023.

== Personal life ==
Christensen is married to actor John Diehl. Their son, born in 1993, Magnus Diehl, is an actor and filmmaker.

== Discography ==
=== with Stone Cupid ===
- The Cardinal (2016)

=== as Julie Christensen ===
- Love Is Driving (1996)
- Soul Driver (2000)
- Something Familiar (2006)
- Where the Fireworks Are (2007)
- Weeds Like Us (2012)
- A Sad Clown (2018)
- 11 From Kevin: Songs of Kevin Gordon (2022)
- The Price We Pay for Love (2023)

=== with the Divine Horsemen ===
- Time Stands Still (Enigma) 1984
- Devil's River (SST) 1986
- Middle of the Night(SST) 1986
- Snake Handler (SST) 1987
- Handful of Sand (SST) 1987
- Hot Rise of an Ice Cream Phoenix (in The Red) 2021
- Bitter End of a Sweet Night (in The Red) 2023
