= Out of Vogue =

EP by Middle Class
- Released: January 1979
- Genre: Hardcore punk, punk rock
- Length: 4:55
- Label: Joke Records
- Producer: Billy S. Star

Middle Class chronology
Out of Vogue (1979)	Scavenged Luxury (1980)

Out of Vogue is the debut EP by American punk rock band the Middle Class. It was distributed locally by independent label Joke Records in January 1979, though it received only small local success in an era where punk had virtually no chance of radio airplay in the US. The band has achieved more recognition in recent years, being featured in the documentary American Hardcore in 2006. According to the documentary, vocalist Jeff Atta quoted that instead of learning instruments and adopting punk as a style, the band instead learned to play the first punk rock records, also relying on precision rather than perfection.

The EP, coming as it did before most other generally recognized landmarks of hardcore punk, is, along with Black Flag's Nervous Breakdown EP, sometimes considered the first record in the genre.

== Track listing ==
- All songs written by Middle Class

=== Side A ===
1. "Out of Vogue" - 1:00
2. "You Belong" - 1:07

=== Side B ===
1. "Situations" - 1:47
2. "Insurgence" - 1:01

== Personnel ==
- Jeff Atta - lead vocals
- Mike Atta - lead guitar
- Mike Patton - bass
- Bruce Atta - drums
