= Byron Coley =

American music critic

Byron Coley is an American music critic who wrote prominently for Forced Exposure magazine in the 1980s, from the fifth issue until the magazine ceased publication in 1993. Prior to Forced Exposure, he wrote for New York Rocker, Boston Rock, and Take It! Coley is one of the first writers to have extensively documented indie rock from its inception to the present day. Coley was a contributing writer and the Underground Editor at Spin in the 1980s and '90s, and currently writes for Wire and Arthur with Thurston Moore. He has also run Ecstatic Yod, a record label and shop based in Florence, Massachusetts.

Coley has contributed liner notes to albums by Borbetomagus, the Flesh Eaters, Sonic Youth, Dinosaur Jr., The Dream Syndicate, Big Boys, Yo La Tengo, John Fahey, Steffen Basho-Junghans, Flaherty/Corsano duo, Urinals, and numerous others. He has also appeared in documentaries about musical artists Half Japanese, Minutemen, Jandek, The Holy Modal Rounders and Borbetomagus, in each extolling the genius of the subject matter. When he wrote the Flesh Eaters' entry in the Spin Alternative Record Guide, Coley stated that he considers A Minute to Pray, A Second to Die the best rock album ever recorded. For the 2007 Deluxe Edition of Sonic Youth's Daydream Nation, he contributed to the liner notes with a reflective essay on the album.

In 1990 Coley began the Father Yod record label in order to put out a Spacemen 3 record. In 1993 the label partnered with Thurston Moore's label Ecstatic Peace and began releasing records under the name Ecstatic Yod. This label operates a retail outlet in Florence, Massachusetts. In 2006 it released OvO's record Smut.

Coley is a published poet and occasionally gives public readings of his (and others') works. He also wrote a biography of Chuck Norris that was published in 1986.

In 2010, Coley became involved with Feeding Tube Records in Northampton, Massachusetts, a record store where he sells rare items from his personal collection.

In 2011, Coley published the first collection of his reviews, C'est la guerre : Early writings 1978-1983, in a bilingual edition put out by Montreal publisher L'Oie de Cravan.
