= A Minute to Pray, a Second to Die (album) =

Studio album by the Flesh Eaters
- Released: 1981
- Studio: Rhapsody Studios
- Genre: Punk rock
- Label: Ruby Records
- Producer: Chris D.

The Flesh Eaters chronology
No Questions Asked (1980)	A Minute to Pray, a Second to Die (1981)	Forever Came Today (1982)

A Minute to Pray, a Second to Die is the second album from American punk rock band the Flesh Eaters. Released in 1981, it is perhaps their most acclaimed work. The band's roster on this album comprises Dave Alvin (guitar), John Doe (bass), Chris D. (vocals, maracas), Steve Berlin (saxophone, rhythm sticks), D. J. Bonebrake (maracas, snare, marimbas) and Bill Bateman (drums).

== Critical reception ==
Professional ratings
Review scores
Source	Rating
AllMusic	4.5/5 stars
Spin Alternative Record Guide	10/10
The Village Voice	B+

Reviewing the album in 1981 for The Village Voice, Robert Christgau wrote, "this eschews the no-speed-limit egoism of El Lay punk convention for a more matoor view of the world, based on the idea that horror movies are worth taking seriously. Not bad for a laff." AllMusic's Patrick Kennedy later called it "a classic album of trashy-noir darkness, seamy Hollywood dreck, campy blues horror, and Stax-influenced, stripped-down guitar punk". In the 1995 Spin Alternative Record Guide, Byron Coley gave the album a perfect score and named it "in my opinion, the finest album ever recorded", writing "[t]he lineup ... was absolutely incredible, sliding between roars of punk bombast, American swamp-roots underpinnings, and explosive jazzy improvs like no one before or since."

== Track listing ==
All tracks composed by Chris D. except where noted.

1. "Digging My Grave" – 4:21
2. "Pray Til You Sweat" – 2:36
3. "River of Fever" – 3:55
4. "Satan's Stomp" – 5:49
5. "See You in the Boneyard" – 3:30
6. "So Long" – 3:30
7. "Cyrano de Berger's Back" (John Doe) – 3:22
8. "Divine Horseman" – 7:08

"Cyrano de Berger's Back" was composed by John Doe, and was later covered by his band X on their albums See How We Are and Alphabetland.
