= I.R.S. Records Presents The Cutting Edge =

- Also known as: The Cutting Edge
- Genre: Music variety show
- Directed by: Jonathan Dayton and Valerie Faris
- Starring: Jools Holland; Jeffrey Vallance; Wazmo Nariz; Peter Zaremba
- Country of origin: United States

Production
- Producers: Jay Boberg; Carl Grasso
- Running time: 60 minutes

Original release
- Network: MTV
- Release: March 1983 – September 1987

I.R.S. Records Presents: The Cutting Edge, also known as The Cutting Edge or IRS's The Cutting Edge, is a music program that aired on MTV from March 1983 to September 1987, on the last Sunday of every month. The show was retitled The Cutting Edge Happy Hour in 1987.

== Background ==
The show was intended to feature performers who might otherwise not be seen on MTV, and featured the earliest appearances on MTV for acts like Madonna, the Red Hot Chili Peppers and R.E.M. The co-founders of I.R.S., Miles Copeland III and Jay Boberg, also saw the program as an effective promotional tool for I.R.S. recording artists at a time when much of the music industry had not yet perceived the marketing value of music videos. Copeland later described himself as "the only record company executive ever to have had his own show on MTV".

== Broadcast history ==
Produced by Jay Boberg and Carl Grasso of I.R.S. Records for MTV, and directed by Jonathan Dayton and Valerie Faris, the first year of the show featured a variety of hosts including Jools Holland, Jeffrey Vallance, and Wazmo Nariz, before settling on Peter Zaremba, the lead singer of the Fleshtones. Interviews with musicians and performances were videotaped in clubs, recording studios and private homes.

As it evolved, the program began to produce programs that focused on regional music scenes around the United States, such as in Winston-Salem, Austin and different neighborhoods around Los Angeles. A 1985 episode filmed in Austin was an important contributor to the brief flourishing of the local "New Sincerity" music scene.

Los Angeles Times critic Terry Atkinson, writing in July 1986, called The Cutting Edge "simply the best program about pop music that we have", with "the most interesting and adventurous new acts".

After a six-month hiatus, the program returned in June 1987 as The Cutting Edge Happy Hour directed by C.D. Taylor. The renamed show was videotaped at a single location, the Hollywood Holiday Inn. A June 1987 episode presented a wide range of performers from Frank Zappa to Ladysmith Black Mambazo, but overall, the series became more focused on Southern California bands, and lost popularity before ending by September 1987.
