= Black Diamond (Stan Ridgway album) =

Studio album by Stan Ridgway
- Released: January 20, 1996
- Studio: Impala and Living Presence (Los Angeles, California)
- Genre: Folk rock, alternative rock
- Length: 50:52
- Label: Birdcage
- Producer: Stan Ridgway

Stan Ridgway chronology
Songs That Made This Country Great (1992)	Black Diamond (1996)	Film Songs (1997)

Black Diamond is the fourth studio album by the American singer-songwriter Stan Ridgway, released in 1996.

== Production ==
"As I Went Out One Morning" is a cover of the Bob Dylan song. "Luther Played Guitar" is about the guitar player Luther Perkins. "Gone the Distance" addresses the death of Kurt Cobain.

== Critical reception ==
Professional ratings
Review scores
Source	Rating
AllMusic	3/5 stars
Calgary Herald	4.5/5 stars
Uncut	1/5 stars

The Washington Post determined that "the Dylan tune is one indication that Ridgway wants to be taken seriously, and he does tone down his arch vocal style on some of these songs." The Boston Globe wrote that the album, "though quieter and more spare than much of Ridgway's work, continues his pattern of writing moody story-songs, restless character studies imbued with dark, spooky undertones."

== Track listing ==
All tracks are written by Stan Ridgway, except "As I Went Out One Morning", by Bob Dylan.

No.	Title	Length
1.	"Big Dumb Town"	4:20
2.	"Gone the Distance"	3:03
3.	"Knife and Fork"	4:52
4.	"Down the Coast Hwy"	4:23
5.	"Luther Played Guitar"	4:20
6.	"Stranded"	4:51
7.	"Wild Bill Donovan"	2:54
8.	"Man of Stone"	3:47
9.	"Pink Parakeet"	4:58
10.	"Underneath the Big Green Tree"	3:21
11.	"As I Went Out One Morning"	3:13
12.	"Crystal Palace"	6:50

== Personnel ==
Adapted from the Black Diamond liner notes.

Musicians

- Stan Ridgway – vocals, theatre organ, acoustic guitars, electric guitars, harmonica, recorder
- Pietra Wexstun – keyboards, backing vocals
- Harlan Boddicker – bass guitar
- Bob Elmo – bass guitar, cello, violin
- Ted Andersen – drums, percussion
- Larry Grennan – percussion, backing vocals
- Todd Sharp – saxophones, woodwinds

Production

- Stan Ridgway – producer
- Larry Grennan – recording, mixing
- Doug Schwartz – mastering at Audio Mechanics (Burbank, California)
- Ed Colver – photography
- Fred Davis – design

== Release history ==
Region	Date	Label	Format	Catalog
United States	1996	Birdcage	CD	11007
United States	2012	Birdcage	LP	11007
