= The Big Heat (song) =

Single by Stan Ridgway

from the album The Big Heat
- B-side: "Salesman"
- Released: 1985
- Recorded: Fiddler's Studio, J.C. Studios and The Lighthouse, Hollywood, CA
- Genre: New wave, alternative rock
- Length: 4:26
- Label: I.R.S.
- Songwriter(s): Stan Ridgway
- Producer(s): Hugh Jones

Stan Ridgway singles chronology
"Don't Box Me In" (1983)	"The Big Heat" (1985)	"Drive, She Said" (1985)

"The Big Heat" is the debut solo single by American singer-songwriter Stan Ridgway, released in 1985 from his 1986 debut solo album The Big Heat. The song dates back to his time in Wall of Voodoo, and was performed live by the group in 1982.

== Formats and track listings ==
All songs written by Stan Ridgway, except where noted.

European 7" single (ILSA 6296)

1. "The Big Heat" – 4:32
2. "Drive, She Said" – 4:35

Australian 7" single (ILSA 12.6588)

1. "The Big Heat" – 4:32
2. "Pick It Up (And Put It in Your Pocket)" – 4:32

Netherlands 12" single (ILSA 12.7025)

1. "The Big Heat" – 4:33
2. "Stormy Side of Town" – 5:01
3. "Salesman" – 5:28

UK 7" single (IRM 123)

1. "The Big Heat" – 3:49 (remix)
2. "Foggy River" (Fred Rose) – 4:20

UK 12" single (IRMT 123)

1. "The Big Heat" – 3:52 (remix)
2. "Foggy River" (Fred Rose) – 4:20
3. "Salesman" – 5:26

== Charts ==
Chart (1985)	Peak position
UK Indie Chart	13
Chart (1987)	Peak position
Australian Singles Chart	91
