= The Way I Feel Today (Stan Ridgway album) =

Studio album of cover songs by Stan Ridgway
- Released: 1998
- Recorded: February 1998
- Studio: El Rey and Impala Studios, Los Angeles, CA
- Genre: Traditional pop, easy listening
- Length: 62:36
- Label: Dis-Information
- Producer: Stan Ridgway

Stan Ridgway chronology
Film Songs (1997)	The Way I Feel Today (1998)	Anatomy (1999)

Professional ratings
Review scores
Source	Rating
Allmusic	2/5 stars

The Way I Feel Today is an album of cover songs by the American singer-songwriter Stan Ridgway, released in 1998 by Dis-Information Recordings.

== Track listing ==
No.	Title	Writer(s)	Length
1.	"Witchcraft"	Coleman, Leigh	3:17
2.	"What Now My Love"	Bécaud, Delanoë, Sigman	3:13
3.	"I've Got You Under My Skin"	Porter	3:46
4.	"I Concentrate on You"	Porter	2:41
5.	"Angel Eyes"	Brent, Dennis	3:51
6.	"It Had to Be You"	Isham Jones, Gus Kahn	2:52
7.	"Yesterdays"	Otto Harbach, Jerome Kern	4:26
8.	"The Coffee Song"	Hilliard, Miles	2:42
9.	"My Way"	Anka	5:13
10.	"One for My Baby (and One More for the Road)"	Arlen, Mercer	4:33
11.	"My Baby Just Cares for Me"	Walter Donaldson, Gus Kahn	2:07
12.	"Oh, What a Beautiful Mornin'"	Rodgers and Hammerstein	2:21
13.	"On a Clear Day"	Lerner, Lane	3:10
14.	"If I Ruled the World"	Bricusse, Ornadel	3:06
15.	"Ol' Man River"	Hammerstein, Kern	3:09
16.	"Make Someone Happy"	Comden, Green, Styne	1:55
17.	"As Time Goes By"	Hupfeld	2:39
18.	"The Impossible Dream (The Quest)"	Darion, Leigh	3:43
19.	"Send in the Clowns"	Sondheim	3:52

== Personnel ==
Adapted from The Way I Feel Today liner notes.

Musicians

- Stan Ridgway – lead vocals, production
- Don Bell – saxophone, brass
- Hecate's Angels – backing vocals
- Rick King – guitar
- Bill Noland – keyboards, production
- Mark Plemsone – string arrangements
- David Sutton – bass guitar
- Pietra Wexstun – backing vocals, production

Production and additional personnel

- Michael Dittrick – recording, editing
- Matt Maxwell – cover art, art direction
- Robert McNeely – production

== Release history ==
Region	Date	Label	Format	Catalog
United States	1998	Dis-Information	CD	0300-2
