= Drive, She Said (song) =

Single by Stan Ridgway

from the album The Big Heat
- B-side: "Rio Greyhound"
- Released: 1985
- Recorded: Fiddler's Studio, J.C. Studios and The Lighthouse, Hollywood, CA
- Genre: New wave, alternative rock, hard rock
- Length: 4:23
- Label: I.R.S.
- Songwriter: Stan Ridgway
- Producer: Hugh Jones

Stan Ridgway singles chronology
"The Big Heat" (1985)	"Drive, She Said" (1985)	"Camouflage" (1986)

"Drive, She Said" is a song by the American singer-songwriter Stan Ridgway and was released as a single in support of his 1985 debut album The Big Heat.

A music video was created for the song, which was filmed in a black and white super 8 film format in Hollywood. It was directed by Andrew Doucette and produced by Tina Silvey under Silvey-Lee Productions. The plot of the music video is centered around a female bank robber who hijacks the taxi of a cabdriver.

== Formats and track listing ==
All songs written by Stan Ridgway, except where noted.

Netherlands 7" single (A 7026)

1. "Drive, She Said" – 4:23
2. "Rio Greyhound" – 3:11

Netherlands 12" single (A 12.7026)

1. "Drive, She Said" – 4:23
2. "Rio Greyhound" – 3:11
3. "Can't Stop the Show" – 3:43

Australian 7" single (ES 1120)

1. "Drive, She Said" – 4:23
2. "Twisted" – 3:35

== Charts ==
Chart (1986)	Peak position
Australian Singles Chart	60
