= Snakebite: Blacktop Ballads & Fugitive Songs =

Studio album by Stan Ridgway
- Released: 2004
- Genre: Rock
- Length: 68:27
- Label: redFLY
- Producer: Stan Ridgway

Stan Ridgway chronology
Blood (2004)	Snakebite: Blacktop Ballads & Fugitive Songs (2004)	Neon Mirage (2010)

Snakebite: Blacktop Ballads & Fugitive Songs is an album by Stan Ridgway. It was released in 2004 through redFLY Records.

== Production ==
After the deaths of two former Wall of Voodoo bandmates, Ridgway wrote "Talkin' Wall of Voodoo Blues Pt. 1", a reflection on the band's history.

== Critical reception ==
Professional ratings
Review scores
Source	Rating
AllMusic	4/5 stars
The Encyclopedia of Popular Music	3/5 stars

PopMatters called the album "full of the sort of lyrical darkness that's been a hallmark of Ridgway's material since the get-go." The Monterey County Weekly wrote: "To accompany his off-kilter lyrics, Ridgway plays music that evokes country blues artists, Tom Waits and arty electronic bands from the ‘80s. Throughout the album, strange instruments accentuate Ridgway’s surreal stories." The Stranger wrote that "the dusty, atmospheric songs of Snakebite bristle and twitch with stringed instruments." The Times of Northwest Indiana called it "perhaps [Ridgway's] finest overall collection to date," writing that "like the best of Ridgway's eclectic oeuvre, the 16 songs nestled into this 'Three Act' album are musical vignettes populated by a twisted cast of darkly-hue characters most everyone can relate to in some way."

== Track listing ==
All tracks are written by Stan Ridgway, except where noted.

No.	Title	Writer(s)	Length
1.	"Into the Sun"		3:29
2.	"Wake Up Sally (The Cops Are Here)"		3:02
3.	"Afghan/Forklift"		4:49
4.	"King for a Day"		5:26
5.	"Your Rockin' Chair"		3:43
6.	"Monsters of the Id"	Mose Allison	4:04
7.	"Running with the Carnival"		4:39
8.	"Our Manhattan Moment"	Stan Ridgway, Pietra Wexstun	5:19
9.	"Crow Hollow Blues"		2:28
10.	"That Big 5-0"		2:47
11.	"God Sleeps in a Caboose"		5:37
12.	"Throw It Away"		3:16
13.	"My Own Universe"		3:33
14.	"Classic Hollywood Ending"		3:54
15.	"Talkin' Wall of Voodoo Blues Pt. 1"		5:55
16.	"My Rose Marie (A Soldier's Tale)"		5:19

== Personnel ==
- Bob Demaa – mastering
- Baboo God – mixing
- Stan Ridgway – Banjo, Bells, Celeste, Composer, Engineer, Guitar, Guitar (Nylon String), Hammer Dulcimer, Harmonica, Harp, Mandolin, Melodica, Slide Guitar, Sound Effects, Vocals, production, engineering, mixing
- Doug Schwartz – mastering
- Alvin Fike – Brass, French Horn, Saxophone, Woodwind
- Skip Heller – Guitar, Guitar (Nylon String), Hi String Guitar, Piano
- Brantley Kearns – Fiddle
- Ricky King – Flute (Wood), Guitar, Vocals
- David Sutton – Bass, Bass (Acoustic), Box
- Pietra Wexstun – Autoharp, Celeste, Composer, Effects, Elka, Farfisa Organ, Glockenspiel, Juno, Loops, Mellotron, Oberheim Synthesizer, Organ, Programming, Reed Organ, Sampling, Sound Effects, Vocals, Wurlitzer
- Bruce Zelesnik – Bird Calls, Drums, Handclapping, Hand Drums, Jawbone, Percussion, Prop Design, Rake, Rhythm, Siren, Sound Effects, Spoons, Train Whistle, Trash Cans
