= Holiday in Dirt =

Compilation album by Stan Ridgway
- Released: Feb. 12, 2002
- Genre: Alternative rock
- Label: Ultramodern/New West
- Producer: Stan Ridgway

Stan Ridgway chronology
Anatomy (1999)	Holiday in Dirt (2002)	Blood (2003)

Professional ratings
Review scores
Source	Rating
AllMusic	4/5 stars
Entertainment Weekly	A−

Holiday in Dirt is an album by Stan Ridgway, released in 2002 through Ultramodern/New West Records. It is a collection of leftovers, rarities, compositions for film soundtracks. A quasi-cinematic project, the release of the Holiday in Dirt album was accompanied by a showing of 14 short films by various independent filmmakers, each film a visual interpretation of one of the songs on the album. A compilation DVD of the films, titled Holiday in Dirt: 14 Short Films of the Music of Stan Ridgway and produced by Minneapolis filmmakers Chris Strouth and Rick Fuller, was released in February 2005.

== Track listing ==
All tracks composed by Stan Ridgway.

No.	Title	Length
1.	"Beloved Movie Star"	4:48
2.	"Operator Help Me"	4:18
3.	"Time Inside"	3:56
4.	"End of the Line"	5:51
5.	"Garage Band '69"	3:21
6.	"Bing Can't Walk"	5:07
7.	"Brand New Special and Unique"	2:51
8.	"After the Storm"	2:53
9.	"Floundering"	3:11
10.	"Amnesia"	2:53
11.	"Whatever Happened to You?"	3:33
12.	"Act of Faith"	4:17
13.	"Beloved Movie Star"	10:54
14.	"[Untitled Hidden Track]"	3:29

== Credits ==
- Stan Ridgway: Composer, guitar, harmonica, keyboards, liner notes, primary artist, producer, vocals
- Ted Andersen: Drums
- Baboo God: Engineer
- Don Bell: Saxophone
- Tchad Blake: Engineer
- Bob DeMaa: Mastering
- Mitchell Froom: Guest artist, organ, producer
- Zander Schloss: Banjo, guitarron, slide guitar
- Chris Strouth: Compilation producer
- David Sutton: Bass guitar
- Pietra Wexstun: Autoharp, keyboards, melodica, background vocals
