= Anatomy (Stan Ridgway album) =

Studio album by Stan Ridgway
- Released: October 1999
- Genre: Alternative rock
- Length: 47:14
- Label: New West
- Producer: Stan Ridgway

Stan Ridgway chronology
The Way I Feel Today (1998)	Anatomy (1999)	Holiday in Dirt (2002)

Anatomy is an album by Stan Ridgway. It was released in October 1999 through New West Records. The disc is a multimedia CD that includes three songs, "Camouflage," "I Wanna Be A Boss," and "The Roadblock," in the now-defunct Liquid Audio format, which were recorded live at the Strand in Los Angeles on November 2, 1991.

== Critical reception ==
Professional ratings
Review scores
Source	Rating
AllMusic	3/5 stars
The Encyclopedia of Popular Music	4/5 stars
Los Angeles Times	2.5/4 stars

The Hartford Courant wrote that the album "seems like a collection of creepy musical stories and eerie instrumentals ... there are often revelations buried under [Ridgway's] haunting musical stories that surface with a jolt days after the disc is done playing." The Sun Sentinel called Anatomy one of 1999's best albums, writing that Ridgway "tours the invisible world of loners and losers for this twilight sermon on the decline of, well, everything." MTV wrote that Ridgway's "moody pieces ... continue to reflect his beginnings as a movie score composer." The New Yorker called the album "a delightfully dark and moody disk."

== Track listing ==
All tracks composed by Stan Ridgway except "Sixteen Tons", by Merle Travis.

No.	Title	Length
1.	"Mission Bell"	5:02
2.	"Deep Blue Polka Dot"	4:38
3.	"Train of Thought"	4:14
4.	"Murray's Steakhouse Story"	1:06
5.	"Susie Before Sunrise"	4:01
6.	"Sweet Pig Alley"	1:12
7.	"Valerie Is Sleeping"	3:03
8.	"Mickey the Priest"	2:17
9.	"Mama Had a Stove"	3:39
10.	"Whistle for Louise"	4:26
11.	"Picasso's Tear"	4:16
12.	"Sixteen Tons"	6:48

== Credits ==
- Stan Ridgway: guitar, producer, keyboards, harmonica, vocals
- Ivan Knight: drums, percussion
- David Sutton: bass guitar
- Baboo God: Engineer
- Chris Strouth: executive producer
- Rick King: guitar
- Adrid Frid: harp, dulcimer
- Pietra Wexstun: keyboards, vocals
- Mastered by Doug Schwartz
- Bart Funsten: Studio assistance
- Recorded by Larry Grennan
- Jeff Stooger: Recorder, flute
- Tommy Arizona: steel guitar
- Jerome Bangote: trumpet, flugelhorn
