= Don't Box Me In =

Single by Stewart Copeland & Stan Ridgway

from the album Rumble Fish (Original Motion Picture Soundtrack)
- B-side: "Drama at Home"
- Released: 1983
- Genre: New wave
- Length: 4:10
- Label: A&M
- Songwriters: Stewart Copeland; Stan Ridgway
- Producer: Stewart Copeland

Stewart Copeland singles chronology
"Rich in a Ditch" (1980)	"Don't Box Me In" (1983)	"Koteja" (1985)

Stan Ridgway singles chronology
"Don't Box Me In" (1984)	"The Big Heat" (1985)

"Don't Box Me In" is a collaboration between the Police drummer Stewart Copeland and former Wall of Voodoo vocalist Stan Ridgway, recorded as part of the soundtrack for the Francis Ford Coppola movie Rumble Fish and subsequently released as a single. Copeland plays guitar, drums, bass and keyboards, and Ridgway sings and plays harmonica.

== Music video ==
A music video for the song, directed by Howard Deutch, included footage from Rumble Fish is interspersed with black and white images of Ridgway and Copeland in the studio.

== Chart positions ==
The song peaked at No. 91 in the UK singles chart in 1984.

Chart (1984)	Peak position
UK Singles (Official Charts)	91
