= Divine Horsemen =

American punk rock band

The Divine Horsemen are an American punk/roots band founded in 1983 by Chris D. (Desjardins), formerly of L.A. punk rock band the Flesh Eaters. The band developed a distinctive (and at the time, very new) alt country- type sound. They took their name from a voodoo term; a worshiper who is possessed by loa during a ceremony is said to be being ridden by "the divine horsemen". The term was also used as a song title by the Flesh Eaters.

Desjardins re-worked several old songs by the Flesh Eaters, notably "Poison Arrow", and exercised his literary side by namechecking Chester Himes, Jim Thompson, Donald Goines, James Ellroy, Harry Crews, Ambrose Bierce and James Joyce amongst others on the track "What Is Red" from the Snake Handler LP.

== Personnel ==
Other band members included Julie Christensen (Chris' then-wife), Matt Lee and Peter Andrus, as well as the Flesh Eaters stalwart Robyn Jameson. They were joined at times by members of L.A. punk bands like Kid Congo Powers of The Gun Club and the Cramps and Jeffrey Lee Pierce of The Gun Club.

Divine Horsemen broke up in 1988. However, more than three decades later, the band reformed. A new album called Hot Rise of an Ice Cream Phoenix was released in 2021. Bitter End of a Sweet Night followed in 2023.

== Albums ==
=== Note on Record Labels ===
The information below provides the record label at the time the album was released. Most of these labels are now defunct or no longer include these albums in their catalog. They have currently been relicensed and reissued by Atavistic Records.

- 1984 Time Stands Still Enigma Records
  - Track Listing
    - When The Rain Comes Down
    - Lily White Hands
    - Past All Dishonor
    - Frankie Silver
    - Sanctuary
    - Heat From The Sun
    - Little Sister
    - Hell's Belle
    - Time Stands Still
    - Tears Fall Away
    - My Sin (Chris D.- Matt Lee -Divine Horsemen)
    - Devil's River
    - Mothers Worry
    - Tenderest Kiss
- 1986 Devil's River on SST Records
  - Track Listing
    - My Sin (Chris D.- Matt Lee -Divine Horsemen)
    - Sapphire
    - Devil's River
    - He Rode Right Into Town
    - Come Into This Place (aka Poison Arrow Of Flame)
    - Tenderest Kiss
    - Love Call
    - Too Young To Die
    - It Doesn't Matter
    - Middle Of The Night
- 1986 Middle of the Night on SST Records
  - Track Listing
    - Middle Of The Night
    - Field Of Stone
    - If Only I Could
    - Little Sister
    - Mother's Worry
    - It Doesn't Matter
    - Gimmie Shelter
    - Voodoo Idol
- 1987 Snake Handler on SST Records
  - Track Listing
    - Snake Handler
    - Kiss Tomorrow Goodbye
    - Stone By Stone (Fire Is My Home)
    - Curse Of The Crying Woman
    - Someone Like You
    - Fire Kiss
    - What Is Red
    - Blind Leading The Blind
    - That's No Way To Live
- 1987 Handful Of Sand EP on SST Records
  - Track Listing
    - Handful Of Sand
    - Curse Of The Crying Woman
    - Frankie Silver (Live)
    - Past All Dishonor (live)
    - Sanctuary (Live)
- 2021 Hot Rise of an Ice Cream Phoenix on In the Red Records
  - Track Listing
    - Mystery Writers
    - Falling Forward
    - Ice Cream Phoenix
    - Mind Fever
    - Handful of Sand
    - Any Day Now
    - 25th Floor
    - Can't You See Me
    - No Evil Star
    - Strangers
    - Barefoot in the Streets
    - Stoney Path
    - Love Cannot Die
- 2023 Bitter End of a Sweet Night on In the Red Records
  - Track Listing
    - Memory Fails
    - Talking In Your Sleep Again
    - You Knew No Other Way
    - Vanina Vanini
    - Bitter End
    - No Mercy
    - The Next Man That I See
    - Dirty Like An Angel
    - On The Wane
    - Murder of Courage
    - These Evils
    - Coffee Shop Blues
    - Notorious
    - Garden of Night
    - Footprints on the Moon
    - It's Still Nowhere
