= Bill Bateman (drummer) =

American drummer (born 1951)

Bill Bateman is an American drummer best known for his long service in the Blasters. He has also played for the Flesh Eaters, the Red Devils, and the Cramps.

In writing of the talent that the Blasters contained, Henry Rollins singled out Bateman as "one of the best drummers there is." A peer drummer, Dennis Diken of the Smithereens, called Bateman in 1987 "one of the most electrifying drummers I've ever heard. His intensity and spirit make your jaw drop."

== Early life ==
Bateman was born on December 16, 1951, in Orange, California. He grew up in Downey, California, where he was neighbors with his future bandmates in the Blasters: Phil Alvin, Dave Alvin, and John Bazz. As Dave Alvin recalled in 2014, they were all like brothers - and fought like brothers too. From boyhood, the quartet shared a deep and abiding love of all forms of American music, and they ventured together into Los Angeles blues clubs, learning from veterans.

== With the Blasters ==
In Make the Music Go Bang! (1997), Los Angeles music journalist Chris Morris described the Blasters c. 1980 and the "brute energy" that the band generated, including "the indefatigable drummer Bill 'Buster' Bateman." Dave Alvin echoed Morris in another history of the L.A. punk scene, Under the Big Black Sun. He noted how "Bill Bateman pounding his drums as if he were trying to kill the damn things" contributed to the band's "undeniably manic, energetic magic."

On occasion Bateman used large meat bones as drumsticks, as observed by Belinda Carlisle of the Go-Go's, with whom Bateman had a two-year relationship in the early 1980s. (One photograph shows them playfully arm-wrestling.)

Yet Bateman also possessed subtlety and rhythmic complexity. Pointing to their mutual education in old American music of all kinds, Phil Alvin said that he used to play a lot of country blues with just Bateman accompanying him, and that Bateman often practiced by playing along with country blues. It helped "explain the Blasters' ability to infuse borrowings from blues, country and soul music with the proper accents, the right touch."

Bateman is pictured on the cover of the 1983 album Non-Fiction, clad in mechanic's coveralls and bearing a rose.

The Blasters played less frequently in the late '80s. In late 1988, Bateman began to devote more of his time to the Blue Shadows (later the Red Devils). Dave Carroll succeeded him as Blasters drummer in 1993 and was subsequently replaced by Jerry Angel in 1994.

After playing on the reunion tours and albums that featured the original lineup in the early 2000s, Bateman rejoined the Blasters on a regular basis in 2008, replacing Jerry Angel. As of 2022, the Blasters remain active with Bateman still holding the drum seat (Video on YouTube).

== With the Flesh Eaters ==
Bateman, along with fellow Blasters members Dave Alvin and Steve Berlin, performed on the 1981 album A Minute to Pray, A Second to Die by the Los Angeles punk band the Flesh Eaters. This lineup, which also included John Doe and D.J. Bonebrake, assembled once again in 2006, performing three shows in California and one in England to mark the album’s 25th anniversary. They reunited briefly in 2015 for a five-show tour and again for an eight-show run in 2018. They issued a new album, I Used to Be Pretty, in 2019.

== With the Blue Shadows/Red Devils ==
Los Angeles club King King (a former Chinese restaurant) opened in late 1988, and Bateman was one of the core members of the Blue Shadows, who took up a regular residence. They attracted the attention of producer Rick Rubin, who prompted them to switch names to the Red Devils. This group released the live album King King in 1992. They broke up in 1994. Bateman subsequently played in later incarnations of the Blue Shadows and the Red Devils.

== With the Cramps ==
Bateman joined the long-running psychobilly band the Cramps in 2004 for a tour that started that summer. Guitarist Poison Ivy noted that they had known him for 20 years. The tour concluded that November, and then the Cramps went on another one of their extended hiatuses. When they reconvened in the summer of 2006, Bateman did a tour of Europe. For their last live shows, however, previous drummer Harry Drumdini was back with them.

== Other activities ==
In recent years, Bateman has performed with the band Electric Children in addition to the Blasters.

He has also built drum sets under the name Bateman Drum Company. Outside of music, he has worked as a carpenter, which he also enjoys because it entails woodworking.

== Personal life ==
In 1985, Bateman married Jennifer Berry, the adopted daughter of actor Ken Berry and actress Jackie Joseph. The duration of the marriage was short, but the ceremony and reception were memorable. Ken Berry had worked with Andy Griffith on Mayberry R.F.D., and Griffith was in attendance, as were Bateman's bandmates from the Blasters, members of Los Lobos, The Go-Go's, and other well-known local rockers.
