= Camouflage (Stan Ridgway song) =

1986 song by Stan Ridgway

Single by Stan Ridgway

from the album The Big Heat
- B-side: "Rio Greyhound"
- Released: 1986
- Studio: Fiddler's, J.C., The Lighthouse (Hollywood, California)
- Length: 7:05; 5:00 (single edit)
- Label: I.R.S.
- Songwriter: Stan Ridgway
- Producer: Louis Van Den Berg

Stan Ridgway singles chronology
"Drive, She Said" (1985)	"Camouflage" (1986)	"Goin' Southbound" (1989)

"Camouflage" is a song by American singer-songwriter Stan Ridgway, released as the third single from his 1986 debut solo album The Big Heat. The song was a chart hit in Europe, peaking at No. 2 in Ireland and No. 4 in the United Kingdom but did not chart in the United States.

== Lyrics ==
The song, written in the style of a cowboy ballad, is sung from the viewpoint of a young PFC (Private first class) of the United States Marine Corps during the Vietnam War. On a search and destroy mission ("hunting Charlie down") he becomes separated from his patrol. Alone in the jungle, he feels himself surrounded and begins to fear for his life; just then, a "big marine" introducing himself as "Camouflage" comes to his rescue. The two fight together through the course of a night making their way back to base, during which the PFC notices that Camouflage is unaffected by bullets and is capable of superhuman feats such as pulling palm trees out of the ground and "swatting them Charlies with it; from here to kingdom come." Camouflage leaves after leading the PFC to the edge of his camp. On his return, the PFC is informed that Camouflage had been on his deathbed for the past week, and died the previous night; just before his death, he said "Semper Fi" and expressed his last wish, "to save a young marine".

Ridgway said, "It may sound kind of Charlie Daniels, but I certainly don't think any Vietnam veterans deserve any less respect after what they've sacrificed. I started thinking about the war... you know lumberjacks have Paul Bunyan, the folklore bit. And I just wanted to make a song that was a tribute in some way. Just a soldier story. It coulda been any of us."

== Reception ==
Spin said, "It's all there: good American boys, treacherous gooks, exotic Asian locale, just like something out of one of those old men's adventure/exploitation mags. Is it camp? Is it serious? The worst part is not knowing whether a guy classy enough to name his first solo album after a film noir would slander this particular Asian war for independence."

== Other versions ==
The Swedish power metal band Sabaton released a cover of "Camouflage" as a bonus track on their 2016 album The Last Stand.

== Charts ==
=== Weekly charts ===
Chart (1986)	Peak position
Australia (Kent Music Report)	76
Austria (Ö3 Austria Top 40)	17
Belgium (Ultratop 50 Flanders)	7
Europe (European Hot 100 Singles)	14
Ireland (IRMA)	2
Netherlands (Dutch Top 40)	14
Netherlands (Single Top 100)	11
Switzerland (Schweizer Hitparade)	11
UK Singles (Official Charts)	4
West Germany (GfK)	8

=== Year-end charts ===
Chart (1986)	Position
Belgium (Ultratop)	81
Europe (European Hot 100 Singles)	76
Netherlands (Single Top 100)	78
UK Singles (OCC)	66
West Germany (Media Control)	61
