= Wazmo Nariz =

American singer

Wazmo Nariz (born Larry Grennan in Chicago, Illinois) is a quirky new wave singer and songwriter. His first success came with an independent single, "Tele-tele-telephone" which was recorded and released on the independent Chicago label Fiction Records in 1978. The single was picked up and was one of Stiff Records' early releases in the UK. They released an EP the next year and I.R.S. Records founder Miles Copeland III signed Wazmo and his band to Illegal Records/I.R.S. The signing resulted in the full-length LP Things Aren't Right and featured the single "Checking Out The Checkout Girl" which received some airplay around the Midwestern U.S. as well as on WPIX-FM in New York City. Further success was limited and there were no other Illegal Records/I.R.S. releases for Wazmo Nariz.

Wazmo Nariz's next recording was the Big Records release Tell Me How To Live. The album cover was designed by Rick Landerman, who also designed logos and posters for him. It was also issued in a plain white cover, hand-stamped with "This album jacket is Hand Stamped. If it looked nicer, the album wouldn't sound Different!" Again, success was limited and five years went by before another recording was released, this time a 12" single "Yahoo Eeeee".

In 1983 Wazmo briefly served as one of the first hosts of the MTV alternative music program, I.R.S. Records Presents The Cutting Edge. "Checking Out the Checkout Girl" is included on the 1989 I.R.S. compilation album These People Are Nuts!

In keeping with Wazmo's quirky reputation, the album cover for "Things Aren't Right" (displayed on the show) has a cover photo that is slightly off-center. Nariz's trademark was his tendency to wear two neckties side by side.

Wazmo has worked with Stan Ridgway under his real name, Larry Grennan, along with his drummer Bruce Zelesnik. Zelesnik performed as a permanent member of Ridgway's band starting in 2002.

On the March 14, 2017 broadcast of The Tonight Show Starring Jimmy Fallon, Wazmo's song "Checking Out the Checkout Girl" was sampled as part of the humorous "Do Not Play List" segment.

Wazmo Nariz band members:

- Jeff Hill - Guitar and backing vocals
- Bruce Zelesnik - Drums
- Jeff Boynton - Keyboards
- James E.McGreevy III - Bass
