= Ricky King =

German guitarist

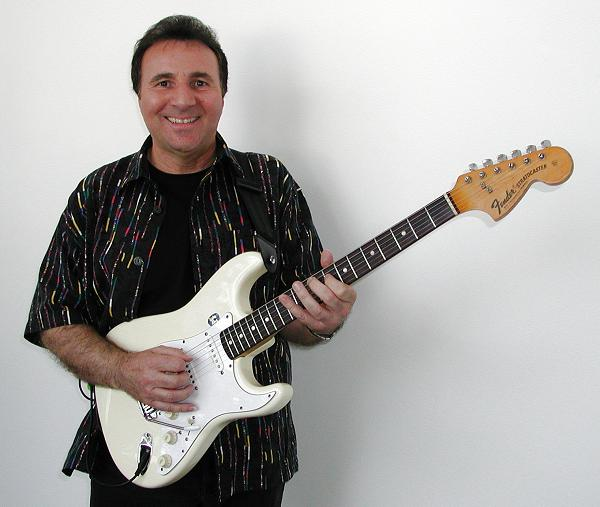
Ricky King.

Ricky King (born Hans Lingenfelder March 12, 1946 in Rastatt, Baden-Württemberg) is a German guitarist. His singles "Verde" and "Le rêve" reached the top ten in Germany, Austria, and Switzerland in 1976. and number 65 in Australia in 1977. In the Netherlands, "Verde" reached number 10 in early 1977.
