= Neon Mirage =

Studio album by Stan Ridgway
- Released: August 24, 2010
- Genre: Rock
- Label: A440 Records

Stan Ridgway chronology
Snakebite (2004)	Neon Mirage (2010)	Mr. Trouble (2012)

Professional ratings
Review scores
Source	Rating
Allmusic	3.5/5 stars

Neon Mirage is an album by Stan Ridgway. It was released on August 24, 2010 through A440 Records. It has been called his most emotionally revealing and mature work to date.

== Track listing ==
1. "Big Green Tree"
2. "This Town Called Fate"
3. "Desert of Dreams"
4. "Halfway There"
5. "Turn a Blind Eye"
6. "Wandering Star"
7. "Flag Up on a Pole"
8. "Lenny Bruce" (Bob Dylan cover)
9. "Scavenger Hunt"
10. "Behind the Mask"
11. "Neon Mirage"
12. "Day Up in the Sun"

== Personnel ==
- Stan Ridgway - acoustic guitar, electric guitar, harmonica, electronics, vocals
- Joe Berardi - percussion
- Ralph Carney - woodwinds, saxophone, flute, panpipes, horns
- Amy Farris - violin, viola, cello, mandolin, vocals
- Don Heffington - percussion
- Rick King - acoustic guitar, electric guitar, electric bass, resonator guitar, slide guitar, pedal steel guitar, vocals
- Brett Simons - bass guitar
- Pietra Wexstun - keyboards, piano, organ, electronics, melodica, vocals
- Bruce Zelesnik - percussion
