= Mosquitos (album) =

Studio album by Stan Ridgway
- Released: 1989
- Studios: Capitol Studios (Hollywood, California); Impala Studios (North Hollywood, California); Knobworld (Echo Park, California)
- Genre: Rock
- Length: 40:53
- Label: Geffen
- Producers: Stan Ridgway; Joe Chiccarelli

Stan Ridgway chronology
The Big Heat (1986)	Mosquitos (1989)	Partyball (1991)

Professional ratings
Review scores
Source	Rating
AllMusic	4.5/5 stars
Robert Christgau	B
Hi-Fi News & Record Review	B:2

Mosquitos is the second solo album by American singer-songwriter Stan Ridgway. It was released in 1989 on Geffen Records.

== Reception ==
Trouser Press called it "a record so chock full of atmosphere that it's nearly visual. As before, Ridgway is more of a narrator than a singer, and he shows his skill as a song- and story-writer on nearly every cut. If The Big Heat was film noir, Mosquitos is The Last Picture Show."

== Track listing ==
1. "Heat Takes a Walk" - 2:43
2. "Lonely Town" - 4:09
3. "Goin' Southbound" - 4:42
4. "Dogs" - 4:05
5. "Can't Complain" - 3:49
6. "Peg and Pete and Me" - 4:41
7. "Newspapers" - 2:41
8. "Calling Out to Carol" - 4:04
9. "The Last Honest Man" - 4:01
10. "A Mission in Life" - 5:53

== Personnel ==
Adapted from the Mosquitos liner notes.

- Stan Ridgway – acoustic piano (1, 4, 5, 10), insect sounds (1), vocals (2–10), lead guitar (2), harmonica (2, 4, 6, 10), "twang" guitar (3), keyboards (5, 6, 8), tin cup (6), electric lead guitar (9)
- Jim Lang – keyboard programming, computer programming, keyboards (1–3, 6, 7), Hammond organ (2), synth bass (3), drum programming (3), vibraharp (8)
- Bernard Sauser-Hall – additional keyboards (1), cloudburst sounds (1), clavinet (3), acoustic piano (4), keyboards (4, 5, 7, 9, 10)
- Pietra Wexstun – additional keyboards (1), cloudburst sounds (1), keyboards (3–5, 9, 10), backing vocals (4, 6, 9)
- Peter White – accordion (7)
- Eric Williams – electric guitars (1, 3, 4, 7, 10), acoustic guitar (2, 5, 6, 8–10), 12-string guitar (3), ukulele (5), bouzouki (6), guitars (7), electric sitar (7), electric 12-string guitar (8), mandolin (8), hammered dulcimer (8)
- Marc Ribot – additional electric guitars (2, 3), electric guitars (4, 8, 10)
- Gregg Arreguin – electric guitars (6)
- Roger Kleier – electric guitars (9)
- Joe Ramirez – bass (1, 4, 8), backing vocals (4), ratchet (4)
- Tim Landers – acoustic bass (2, 10), fretless bass (5, 6), bass (7, 9)
- Denny Fongheiser – drums (9)
- Joseph Berardi – percussion (1, 10), wildlife sounds (1), drums (2–8, 10), congas (5), marimba (5), accordion (6)
- Steve Reid – percussion (1, 2, 4, 6, 8, 10), wildlife sounds (1), congas (2), bongos (8)
- Jon Kip – woodwinds (1)
- Marty Krystall – woodwinds (1)
- Steve Berlin – saxophones (4)
- Phil Kenzie – saxophone (6)
- Steve Fowler – horns (9)
- Bruce Fowler – trombone (8), horns (9), trombone solo (9)
- Walt Fowler – horns (9)
- Van Dyke Parks – string arrangements (1)
- Roger Lebow – cello (1)
- Daniel Smith – cello (1)
- Berg Garabedian – violin (1)
- Ezra Kliger – violin (1)
- Sid Page – violin (1), concertmaster (1)
- Paul Shure – violin (1)
- Richard Greene – electric violin (3)
- Joe Chemay – backing vocals (2)
- Jim Haas – backing vocals (2)
- Jon Joyce – backing vocals (2)
- Larry Grennan – backing vocals (3, 5, 9), pulleys (5), weights (5)
- Tori Amos – backing vocals (4, 6, 9)

=== Production ===
- Gary Gersh – executive producer
- Joe Chiccharelli – producer
- Stan Ridgway – producer
- Peter Doell – recording
- Ken Jones – additional tracking (5)
- John Porter – additional tracking (5)
- Csaba Pectoz – mixing at The Grey Room (Hollywood, California)
- Jim Dineen – assistant mix engineer
- Bob Ludwig – mastering at Masterdisk (New York City, New York)
- Sharon Cain – design
- Gabrielle Raumberger – design
- Scott Lindgren – cover concept, photography
- Chris Lamson for Long Arm Talent – management

== Accolades ==
Year	Publication	Country	Accolade	Rank
1989	Best	France	"Albums of the Year"	8
"*" denotes an unordered list.

== Chart positions ==
=== Singles ===
Year	Title	Peak chart positions			
Year	Title	US Mod	BE	NLD	UK
1989	"Calling Out to Carol"	13	19	23	91
1989	"Goin' Southbound"	8	—	—	—
"—" denotes singles that were released but did not chart.
