= Middle Class (band) =

American punk rock band

- Origin: Santa Ana, California, U.S.
- Genres: Punk rock, hardcore punk, post-punk
- Years active: 1977–1982, 2011–2014
- Past members: Mike Atta; Jeff Atta; Bruce Atta; Mike Patton; Matt Simon

Middle Class were an American punk rock band established in 1977 from Orange County, California. The band consisted of Jeff Atta on vocals, Mike Atta on lead guitar, Mike Patton (not to be confused with Mike Patton) on bass, and Bruce Atta on drums.

== History ==
Michael Azerrad states that "by 1979 the original punk scene [in Southern California] had almost completely died out." "They were replaced by a bunch of toughs coming in from outlying suburbs who were only beginning to discover punk's speed, power and aggression";"dispensing with all pretension, these kids boiled the music down to its essence, then revved up the tempos...and called the result "hardcore", creating a music that was "younger, faster and angrier, [and] full of...pent-up rage..."

The band's Out of Vogue record is widely regarded as the first hardcore punk record, a view supported by author Steven Blush in his book American Hardcore: A Tribal History. The band themselves have also been called the first hardcore band even though Black Flag formed in 1976.

The band pioneered a shouted, fast version of punk rock which would shape the hardcore sound that would soon emerge. The band achieved success in the hardcore punk scene of Southern California. Their first shows were in 1978 in various Los Angeles clubs and ballrooms.

Their only LP, Homeland, is different from their other work and compares to the records of the Pop Group and Wipers. The song "Listen" became a staple on US college radio in the mid-80s.

The band reunited in 2011, with Matt Simon replacing original drummer Bruce Atta, and played sporadically until 2014 when guitarist Mike Atta died of kidney and lung cancer, on April 20, 2014, aged 53. Mike Patton and Matt Simon continued to play together in the band Eddie and the Subtitles. On November 11, 2024, it was announced that Jeff Atta had died.

== Discography ==
Studio albums

- Homeland (1982)

EPs

- Out of Vogue (1978)
- Scavenged Luxury (1980)

Compilations

- A Blueprint for Joy: 1978-1980 (1995)
- Out of Vogue: The Early Material (2008)

Various Artists compilations

- Tooth and Nail (1979)
