= Terminus (1987 film) =

1987 film by Pierre-William Glenn

- Film poster
- Directed by: Pierre-William Glenn
- Written by: Patrice Duvic; Alain Gillot; Wallace Potts
- Produced by: Anne François; Marita Coustet
- Starring: Johnny Hallyday; Karen Allen; Jürgen Prochnow
- Cinematography: Jean-Claude Vicquery
- Edited by: Thierry Derocles
- Music by: David Cunningham
- Release date: 28 January 1987 (France)
- Running time: 110 minutes
- Countries: France; Germany
- Languages: French; English

Terminus is a 1987 French-German science fiction film directed by Pierre-William Glenn.

== Plot ==
In the year 2037, an international sport has been established, wherein a driver of a truck must cross the country and arrive at a designated terminus, while confronting obstacles and enemies along the way. The lead truck, named "Monster", has been designed by a boy genius (Gabriel Damon) and is to be piloted through the course by a woman named Gus (Karen Allen). Eventually, the truck's AI fails and Gus ends up in uncharted territories. There, she encounters leather-clad "hoods" (hoodlums) that torture her and eventually kill her. Prior to dying, she befriends a fellow prisoner (Johnny Hallyday), who later uses the truck to rescue himself and a young orphan. Meanwhile, the boy genius watches them by an artificial satellite so that he may see how well the truck's software works. The conclusion reveals that as he watches the truck, he is himself watched and evaluated by the sinister doctor (Jürgen Prochnow) who cloned him.

== Cast ==
- Johnny Hallyday as Stump (Manchot)
- Karen Allen as Gus
- Jürgen Prochnow as Doctor/Sir/The Hostile Truck Driver
- Gabriel Damon as Mati
- Dominique Valera as The Commander

== Reception ==
This film has been categorized as a strange oddity with Moria giving it two of four stars. The props and sets were praised. This French-German production is one of the strangest oddities to emerge from the cycle of films inspired by Mad Max 2.

== Soundtrack ==
Released as a vinyl album in France by Carrere

A1 End Of The Line (Long Version) Vocals – Stan Ridgway 05:40

A2 Tracks 1:50

A3 The Grey's Pursuit 2:17

A4 Highway Chase 3:12

A5 Docteur Labo 1:42

A6 Monster's Drive 2:06

A7 Military Roadblock 2:05

B1 Love Theme "Terminus" Composed By – Stan Ridgway Performer – Stan Ridgway 4:30

B2 Princess Tango 2:42

B3 Bridge In Fire 1:15

B4 Jailbird 2:15

B5 Terminus (Front Title) 3:36

B6 Highway Chase 3:12

All compositions by David Cunningham except A1 and B1 by Stan Ridgway
