= The Controllers (Los Angeles band) =

The Controllers were an American Los Angeles-based punk rock band, who were formed in early 1977.

The original members were Kidd Spike (guitar/vocals), guitarist/vocalist Johnny Stingray, and Gaye Austin (drums). Later members included Hillary Dillary (drums), D.O.A. Danny (a.k.a. Dan Davis, bass), Charlie Trash (drums) and Mad Dog (a.k.a. Karla Duplantier, drums).

The Controllers were part of the rapidly growing Los Angeles punk rock scene in 1977, even becoming favorites at Brendan Mullen's underground club The Masque. They were the first band to play an advertised show at The Masque and the last to play there in any form in 1996 at a record release party held by Exene Cervenka.

Their debut releases, in 1978, was the "Neutron Bomb" single on the seminal punk label, What Records? A different version of the song, "(The Original) Neutron Bomb", appeared as part of a 1978 three-song compilation EP on What Records? along with songs by The Eyes and The Skulls. They released the "Slow Boy" EP in 1979 on Siamese Records before the band's demise.

Retrospective releases include the album The Controllers, issued in 2000 by Bacchus Archives, and Another Sunny Day, issued by Artifix Records in 2006.
