= The Big Heat (album) =

Album by Stan Ridgway

Studio album by Stan Ridgway
- Released: 1986
- Studios: Fiddler's Studio, J.C. Studios and The Lighthouse, Hollywood, CA
- Genres: New wave, alternative rock, avant-pop
- Length: 42:15
- Label: I.R.S.
- Producers: Joe Chiccarelli, Mitchell Froom, Hugh Jones, Bill Noland, Stan Ridgway, Louis van den Berg

Stan Ridgway chronology
The Big Heat (1986)	Mosquitos (1989)

Singles from The Big Heat
- 1. "The Big Heat" Released: 1985; 2. "Salesman" Released: 1985; 3. "Drive, She Said" Released: 1985; 4. "Camouflage" Released: 1986; 5. "Walkin' Home Alone" Released: 1986

Professional ratings
Review scores
Source	Rating
AllMusic	3/5 stars
The Village Voice	B

The Big Heat is the debut solo album by American musician Stan Ridgway (former Wall of Voodoo vocalist), released in 1986 by I.R.S. Records. Named after the 1953 film noir of the same name, the original release consisted of nine songs, including the No. 4 UK hit "Camouflage". In 1986, the album reached No. 131 on the Billboard 200. The album was re-released in 1993 with six additional tracks and again re-released in 2007.

== Recording ==
Ridgway said of the album, "I wanted to bring a lot of influences to the surface. In Voodoo, we would take the influences and hide them. I wanted to move along and be able to do a jazz song. My heroes are people like Miles Davis who go through different musical stages and don't get stagnant." He opted to solicit the assistance of outside producers, including Joe Chiccarelli and Mitchell Froom. Discussing his decision, Ridgway expressed his belief that self-producing would have presented some difficulties, although he ultimately believed that he could have provided more creative input on the production choices.

== Reception ==
Billboard wrote that the album combines "modern electronic instrumentation with a sly array of offbeat timbres, from banjo to trombone, that set Ridgway's vision apart." Spin said, "A man of few words, he makes every line count for something — either an image that evokes a scene or a line of dialogue that evokes a character. His decision to build and record in his own studio has paid off with a well-balanced sound that has lots of space for odd acoustic instruments to dart in and out of his synth-based arrangements."

Trouser Press said, "It's no coincidence that the lyrics are printed on the inner sleeve in prose format; the singer is a pulp novelist at heart. The Big Heat is a rare record — one that will have you as interested in the lyrical action as its substantial musical attributes."

== Track listing ==
All tracks are written by Stan Ridgway, except where otherwise indicated.

Side one
No.	Title	Length
1.	"The Big Heat"	4:26
2.	"Pick It Up (And Put It in Your Pocket)"	4:32
3.	"Can't Stop the Show"	3:45
4.	"Pile Driver"	4:44
5.	"Walkin' Home Alone"	4:31

Side two
No.	Title	Length
1.	"Drive, She Said"	4:11
2.	"Salesman"	5:23
3.	"Twisted"	3:37
4.	"Camouflage"	7:05

CD edition bonus track
No.	Title	Length
10.	"Rio Greyhound"	3:12

1993 remastered CD track listing
No.	Title	Writer(s)	Length
11.	"Stormy Side of Town"		5:02
12.	"Foggy River"	Fred Rose	4:32
13.	"End of the Line"		5:51
14.	"Nadine"	Chuck Berry	3:26
15.	"Can't Stop the Show" (live)		3:53
16.	"Drive, She Said" (live)		4:39

- Before the album's release, the track "Pick It Up (And Put It in Your Pocket)" was used in a 1985 episode of Miami Vice.

== Personnel ==
Adapted from The Big Heat liner notes.

- Stan Ridgway – lead vocals, guitar (A3, A5, B1, B2, B4), keyboards (A1, A4, B2-B4), harmonica (A1, B1), banjo (A2), bass guitar (B3), production (A3-A5), engineering (A3-A5)

Musicians

- K. K. Barrett – drums (B1)
- Chris Becerra – drums (B4)
- Joe Berardi – drums (A5)
- Hugo Burnham – percussion (A2)
- Luis Cabaza – bass guitar (B2)
- Mr. Christopher – violin (A1), cello (A1)
- Mark Cohen – banjo (A4), mandolin (A4)
- John Dentino – keyboards (A1)
- Bruce Fowler – trombone (A5)
- Richard Gibbs – instruments (B2)
- Richard Greene – violin (A2)
- Mark Lewis – backing vocals (B4)
- Mark Morris – backing vocals (B4)
- Bill Noland – keyboards (A1, B1, B2), piano (A2), production (B2)

Musicians (cont.)

- Joe Ramirez – backing vocals (A4), drum programming (A4), guitar (B1)
- Tom Rechoin – percussion (A2)
- Steve Reid – percussion (B2)
- Mark Terlizzi – bass guitar (A3)
- Louis van den Berg – keyboards (A3-A5, B3, B4), producer (A3-A5), engineering (A3-A5)
- Mike Watt – bass guitar (A3)
- Pietra Wexstun – backing vocals (A3)
- Eric Williams – guitar feedback
- Bruce Zelesnik – drums (A1)

Production and additional personnel

- Joe Chiccarelli – production (B2), engineering (B2), mixing (B2)
- Mitchell Froom – production (A2), keyboards (A2)
- Carl Grasso – art direction
- Jim Hill – engineering (A2)
- Hugh Jones – production (A1, B1), engineering (A1, B1), mixing (A1), keyboards (A1)
- Scott Lindgren – photography, cover art
- Andy Waterman – mixing (A2-A5, B1)

== Chart positions ==
Album

Chart (1986)	Peak position
Australia (Kent Music Report)	61
Germany (Media Control Charts)	38
Netherlands (MegaCharts)	62
Norway (VG-lista)	11
Switzerland (Swiss Hitparade)	27
US Top Pop Albums (Billboard)	131

== Accolades ==
Year	Publication	Country	Accolade	Rank
1986	Best	France	"Albums of the Year"	3
1986	Q	United Kingdom	"Albums of the Year"	*
1986	Sounds	United Kingdom	"Albums of the Year"	*
1990	Mucchio Selvaggio	Italy	"The Best Albums of the 80s"	*
1990	Velvet	Italy	"The 100 Best Albums of the 80s"	*
1991	Rock & Folk	France	"The 250 Best Albums from 1966-1991"	3
1999	Panorama	Norway	"The 30 Best Albums of the Year 1970-98"	19
2002	Mucchio Selvaggio	Italy	"100 Best Albums by Decade"	1-20
"*" denotes an unordered list.

== Release history ==
Region	Date	Label	Format	Catalog
Spain	1986	Epic	CD, CS, LP	40-2687
United Kingdom	1986	I.R.S.	CD, LP	1008
United States	1986	I.R.S.	CD, LP	5637
United States	1993	I.R.S.	CD	X2 0777 7 13125 26
United Kingdom	2012	Water	CD	Water252
