= Partyball =

Studio album by Stan Ridgway
- Released: May 1991
- Studios: American Recording Co. and The Bakery (North Hollywood, California); Impala (Los Angeles, California); Master Control (Burbank, California)
- Genre: Rock
- Length: 47:19
- Label: Geffen
- Producer: Stan Ridgway

Stan Ridgway chronology
Mosquitos (1989)	Partyball (1991)	Songs That Made This Country Great (1992)

Singles from Partyball
- 1. "I Wanna Be a Boss" Released: 1991

Partyball is the third album by Stan Ridgway, released in 1991.

== Critical reception ==
Professional ratings
Review scores
Source	Rating
AllMusic	3/5 stars
The Encyclopedia of Popular Music	3/5 stars

Trouser Press wrote that the album "serves up odes to trigger-happy cops, hopeless love, Harry Truman and the atom bomb, otherworldly chain gangs and plague-ridden dystopias, interrupted by odd instrumental interludes that continue Ridgway’s fascination with soundtrack music for invisible movies." The Los Angeles Times called the songs "mainly about the fearsome distortions that come from dominance, power and an unwillingness to acknowledge weakness and vulnerability as our common human lot."

== Track listing ==
All tracks composed by Stan Ridgway

1. "Watch Your Step/Jack Talked (Like a Man on Fire)" - 4:19
2. "I Wanna Be a Boss" - 4:52
3. "Mouthful of Sand/The Roadblock" - 5:31
4. "Snaketrain" - 3:53
5. "Right Through You" - 3:45
6. "The Gumbo Man" - 3:34
7. "Harry Truman" - 3:51
8. "Venus Is Hell/Overlords" - 5:39
9. "O.K?/Uba's House of Fashions" - 4:36
10. "Bad News at the Dynamite Ranch/Beyond Tomorrow" - 7:19

== Personnel ==
Adapted from the Partyball liner notes.

- Stan Ridgway – vocals, backing vocals (1, 9, 10), keyboards (2–6, 8), acoustic guitar (2, 6, 7), guitars (3–5, 8), harmonica (3)
- Bernard Sauser-Hall – keyboards (1, 7, 9, 10), organ (6)
- Pietra Wexstun – keyboards (1, 7, 9, 10), backing vocals (1, 2, 5, 9, 10)
- Jeff Boynton – acoustic piano (5)
- Mark Schulz – guitars (1, 9, 10), electric guitar (2, 7)
- Don Teschner – lap steel guitar (4)
- Joe Ramirez – bass (1, 6, 7, 9), backing vocals (1, 9)
- David Sutton – bass (2), fretless bass (5)
- Joseph Berardi – drums (1, 2, 6, 7, 9, 10), timpani (1), percussion (6, 8, 10)
- Jim Hill – additional drum programming, anvil (8)
- Elmo Smith – saxophone (3, 8)
- Beth Anderson – backing vocals (2)
- John Batdorf – backing vocals (2)
- Larry Grennan – backing vocals (2, 10)
- Evon Williams – backing vocals (2)

Production

- Stan Ridgway – producer
- Jim Hill – engineer, recording, mixing (1.1, 2–9.2, 10.1)
- Joe Chiccharelli – mixing (1.2, 9.2, 10.2)
- Andrew Ballard – second engineer
- Bill Cooper – second engineer
- Mike Green – second engineer
- Alan Yoshida – mastering at The Mastering Lab (Hollywood, California)
- Beth Escott – art direction, design
- Kevin Reagan – Geffen art direction
- Rocky Schenck – photography

== Chart positions ==
=== Singles ===
Year	Title	Peak Chart positions
Year	Title	US Mod
1991	"I Wanna Be a Boss"	13
