= Stan Ridgway =

American musician (born 1954)

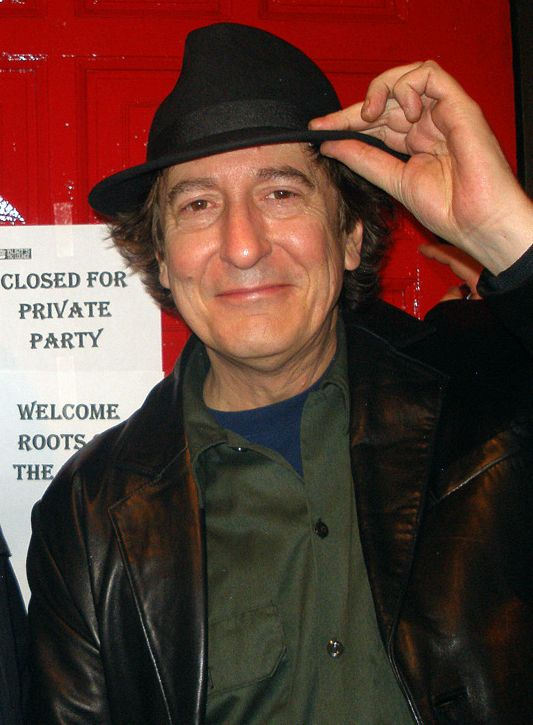
- Ridgway in 2009

Background information
- Born: Stanard Ridgway Funsten; April 5, 1954 (age 72); Barstow, California, U.S.
- Genres: New wave; industrial rock; film score; punk rock
- Instruments: Vocals; guitar; keyboards; harmonica
- Years active: 1977–present
- Labels: Restless; I.R.S.; Geffen; Birdcage; New West
- Website: stanridgway.com

Stanard Ridgway (born April 5, 1954) is an American singer-songwriter, and film and television composer known for his distinctive voice, dramatic lyrical narratives, and eclectic solo albums. He was the original lead singer and a founding member of the band Wall of Voodoo.

== Early life ==
Stan Ridgway was born in Barstow, California, in the "high desert", and raised in Los Angeles. He claims to have been a budding ventriloquist who spent his first night in jail at the age of 12 for stealing street signs. Ridgway also had a childhood fascination with folk music, pestering his parents until they bought him a banjo at the age of 14.

== Wall of Voodoo ==
The band was named by Ridgway before their first show, in reference to a comment made by a friend, while recording and overdubbing a Kalamazoo Rhythm Ace drum machine, which was a gift from voice actor Daws Butler. While listening to some of the music created in the studio, Ridgway jokingly compared the multiple-drum-machine and Farfisa-organ-laden recordings to Phil Spector's Wall of Sound, whereupon the friend commented it sounded more like a "wall of voodoo" and the name stuck.

Wall of Voodoo's music was a mix of new wave and Ennio Morricone's Spaghetti Western soundtracks of the 1960s. Adding to the music's distinctiveness was percussive and textural experimentation, i.e. mixing drum machines with unconventional instruments such as pots, pans and various kitchen utensils, raw electronics with interlocking melodic figures as well as twangy spaghetti-western guitar. On top of the mix was Ridgway's unusual vocal style and highly stylized, cinematic narratives heavily influenced by science fiction and film noir, sung from the perspective of ordinary people and characters wrestling with ironies inside the American Dream.

== Solo career ==
Ridgway embarked on a solo career in 1983, shortly after Wall of Voodoo's appearance at the US Festival. He collaborated on the song "Don't Box Me In" with Stewart Copeland for the soundtrack to Francis Ford Coppola's 1983 film Rumble Fish. In 1986 he released his first proper solo album, The Big Heat, which included the top 5 European (including UK) hit "Camouflage". This was followed by numerous other solo recordings: Mosquitos (1989), Partyball (1991), Black Diamond (1995), Anatomy (1999), The Way I Feel Today (1998), a collection of big band standards, and Holiday in Dirt (2002), a compilation of outtakes and previously unreleased songs. Ridgway's album Snakebite: Blacktop Ballads and Fugitive Songs (2005), features the narrative song, "Talkin' Wall Of Voodoo Blues Pt. 1", a history of his former band in song.

Ridgway's album Holiday in Dirt was a quasi-cinematic project, with the release of the album accompanied by a showing of 14 short films by various independent filmmakers, each film a visual interpretation of one of the songs on the album. A compilation DVD of the films was released in February 2005.

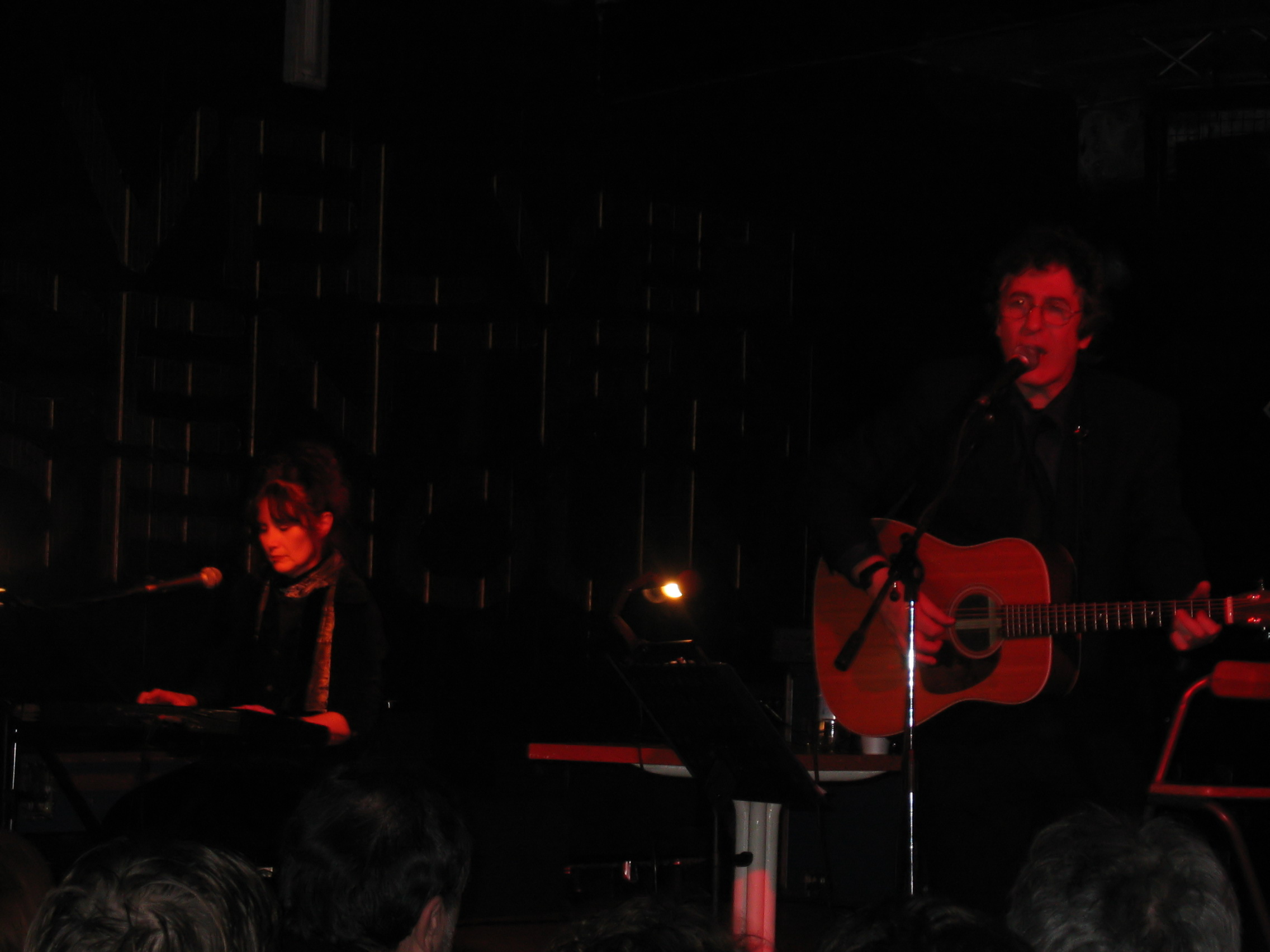
Ridgway (right) performing with Pietra Wexstun in 2005

In 1994, Ridgway began work on a new project in the form of a trio called Drywall, the other members of the trio being Ridgway's wife, keyboardist/vocalist Pietra Wexstun of the band Hecate's Angels (who had previously worked with Ridgway on Mosquitos and Partyball), and former Rain Parade drummer Ivan Knight. In 1995, Drywall released its first album (first of a "trilogy of apocalyptic documents"), titled Work the Dumb Oracle. A short film directed by Carlos Grasso, titled The Drywall Incident, was released the same year. An extended, instrumental soundtrack album for The Drywall Incident was released in 1996.

Ridgway and Wexstun also collaborated and forayed into new musical territory, composing a suite of mostly instrumental and orchestral pieces to accompany an exhibition of postmodern surrealist artist Mark Ryden's paintings after being introduced by a mutual friend, Sean P. Riley, who toured with Wall of Voodoo on their 1982 "Call of the West – Tour of Virtue" as the band's merchandiser. The album was released on CD in 2003 as Blood – Miniature Paintings of Sorrow and Fear in a unique 3-panel packaging design by the artist, which quickly sold out of its limited pressing of 7,500. Ridgway plays banjo and harmonica in Wexstun's group Hecate's Angels.

Ridgway and Drywall regrouped in 2006 to release the album Barbeque Babylon, the third "apocalyptic document" with the single "The AARP Is After Me". The new Drywall lineup features Rick King on guitars and bass and Bruce Zelesnik on drums and percussion. In 2008, Ridgway and Wexstun released Silly Songs for Kids Vol. 1, a collection of children's songs that feature the duo and also saxophonist and woodwind player Ralph Carney.

Ridgway has also contributed to albums and projects by producer Hal Willner, Frank Black and the Catholics, the Flesh Eaters, the Divine Horsemen, The Ray Campi Quartet, the Fibonaccis, and Roger McGuinn.

== Discography ==
With Wall of Voodoo:

- Wall of Voodoo (1980)
- Dark Continent (1981)
- Call of the West (1982)

With Drywall:

- Work The Dumb Oracle (1995)
- Barbeque Babylon (2005)

As a Solo Artist:

- The Big Heat (1986)
- Mosquitos (1989)
- Partyball (1991)
- Songs That Made This Country Great (1992)
- Black Diamond (1996)
- The Way I Feel Today (1998)
- Anatomy (1999)
- Holiday in Dirt (2002)
- Snakebite (2004)
- Neon Mirage (2010)
- Mr. Trouble (2012)
- Priestess of the Promised Land (2016)

== Film scores ==
- Rumble Fish (1983), directed by Francis Ford Coppola (end title song "Don't Box Me In" with Stewart Copeland)
- Terminus (1987), directed by Pierre-William Glenn (title song "End Of The Line")
- Slam Dance (1987), directed by Wayne Wang (song "Bing Can't Walk")
- Pump Up the Volume (1990), directed by Allan Moyle (song "Talk Hard")
- Future Kick (1991), directed by Damian Klaus (score)
- Floundering (1994), directed by Peter McCarthy (title song & "My Drug Buddy" (later renamed "Amnesia" when released on Holiday in Dirt))
- September Songs – The Music of Kurt Weill (1994), directed by Larry Weinstein (singer Cannon Song).
- Box of Moonlight (1996), directed by Tom DiCillo (writer: "Mexican Radio" – as Stanard R. Funsten)
- Melting Pot (1997), directed by Tom Musca (score)
- Death Smokes a Big Cigar (1997), directed by Franco Riccardi (score)
- Error In Judgment (1998), directed by Scott Levy (score)
- Desperate But Not Serious (1999), directed by Bill Fishman (score)
- Speedway Junky (1999), directed by Nick Perry (score)
- The Keening (1999), directed by Alex & Andrew Smith (score)
- Simpatico (1999), directed by Matthew Warchus (end title song)
- $pent (2000), directed by Gil Cates Jr. (score)
- Vengeance (2001), directed by Brian Belefant (songs)
- Desert Saints (2002), directed by Richard Greenberg (song)

== Related artists ==
- Wall of Voodoo
- Pete McRae
- Hal Willner
- Frank Black and the Catholics
- The Flesh Eaters
- Divine Horsemen
- The Fibonaccis
- Roger McGuinn
