= Samuel Tilden Norton =

American architect

S. Tilden Norton
- Born: January 12, 1877; Los Angeles, California
- Died: February 16, 1959 (aged 82); Los Angeles, California
- Education: Los Angeles High School
- Occupation: Architect
- Practice: Norton and Wallis, Architects
- Buildings: Greek Theatre, Los Angeles Theatre, Wilshire Boulevard Temple

Samuel Tilden Norton (January 21, 1877 – February 16, 1959), or S. Tilden Norton as he was known professionally, was a Los Angeles–based architect active in the first decades of the 20th century. During his professional career, he and Abram M. Edelman were considered the city's preeminent synagogue architects, and he was also associated with the firm of Norton & Wallis.

== Personal life ==
Norton was born on January 21, 1877, to Isaac and Bertha (Greenbaum) Norton. Isaac Norton moved to Los Angeles in 1869 and was the founder of an early building and loan firm, Metropolitan Building and Loan Assn. Bertha was the daughter of Mr. and Mrs. E. Greenbaum, the latter the first Jewish woman to come to Los Angeles, having arrived in 1851. Norton's siblings included Albert, an attorney and financier and Florence (Florie) Norton Desenberg (married M. B. Desenberg).

Norton graduated in 1895 from Los Angeles High School.

Norton married the former Esther Gro(e)del, daughter of Selina and Louis Groedel, in Baltimore in 1904. They had a daughter, Elizabeth, who attended USC, married J. L. Rudé, and bore Norton three grandchildren. The family lived for many years at 66 Fremont Place near downtown Los Angeles. Norton died on February 16, 1959, at the age of 82 after a long illness, at Cedars of Lebanon Hospital, predecessor to today's Cedars-Sinai Medical Center.

== Professional career ==
Following his graduation from high school, Norton immediately began his professional training working as a draftsman for Edward Neissen, a Los Angeles architect. He later moved temporarily to New York City for further design apprenticeship work. Upon his return to Los Angeles, Norton founded his own architectural firm around 1902 at 253 South Broadway, Room 316. He later moved to 607 South Hill Street, Room 418. By the 1930s, his office was at Room 1210, 704 South Spring Street—the Financial Center Building of which he had been the architect in 1927.

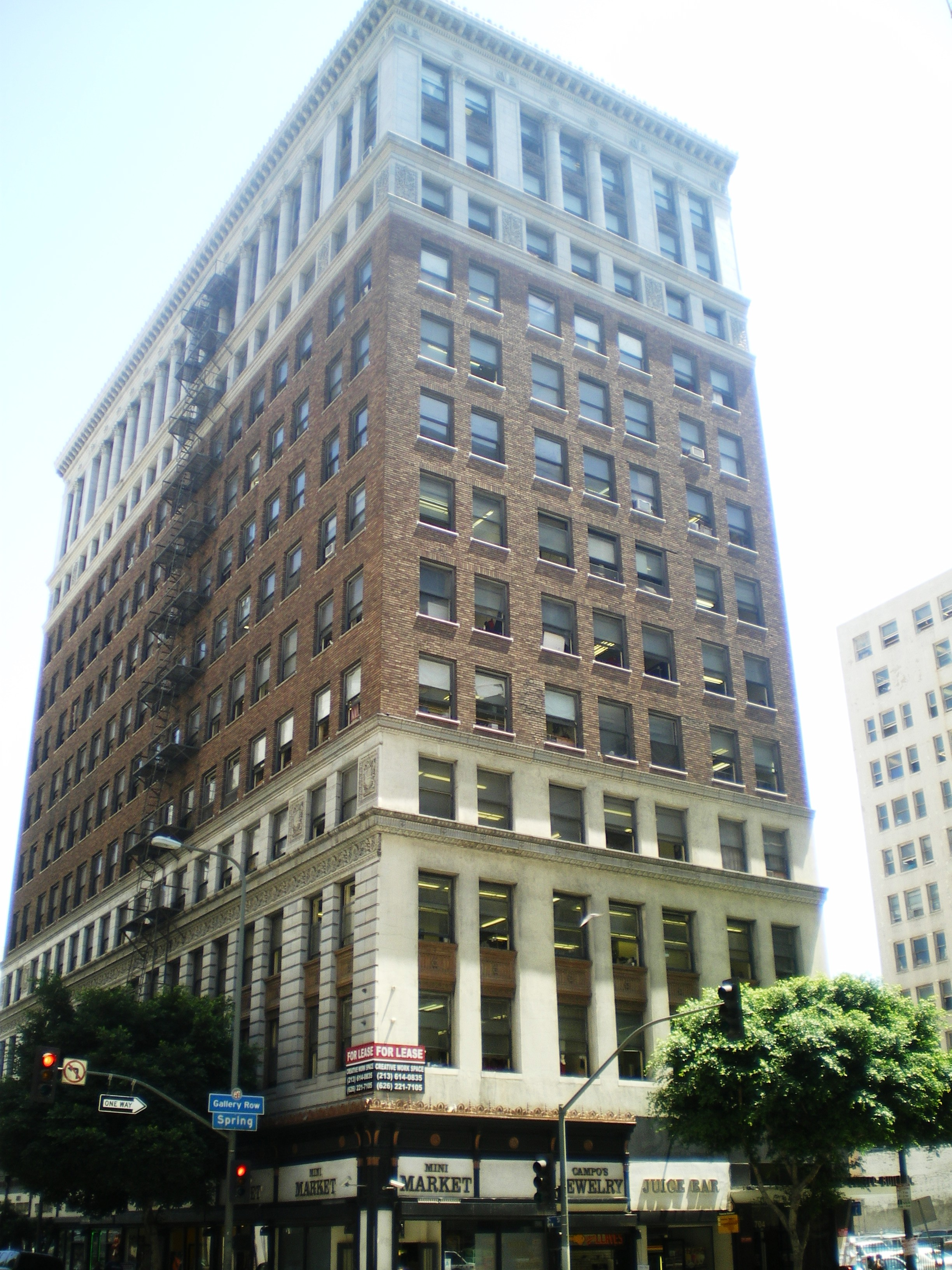
Financial Center Building on Spring St., designed by Norton and also the location of his office

Norton had early on formed a partnership with Frederick H. Wallis, their firm being known as Norton and Wallis, Architects. He was also associated with the family-owned Norton Investment Company (or Norton Securities Company).

== Community activities ==
Norton was very involved in his community. He was a founder and charter member of the Hillcrest Country Club and served as a director of the Prudential Building and Loan Association. He was also a proud upholder of his faith, serving as president of the Board of Trustees of Congregation B'nai B'rith, the Jewish Men's Professional Club of Los Angeles, Nathan Straus Palestine Society, and Jewish Consumption Relief,. In addition, he was a director of the Federation of Jewish Welfare Organizations, the Jewish Welfare Fund, and Wilshire Boulevard Temple. Norton was professionally active as well, having served as president of the Southern California Chapter of the American Institute of Architects which he had joined around 1912. He also wrote articles about houses for The Illustrated Magazine beginning in the early 1900s.

== List of works ==
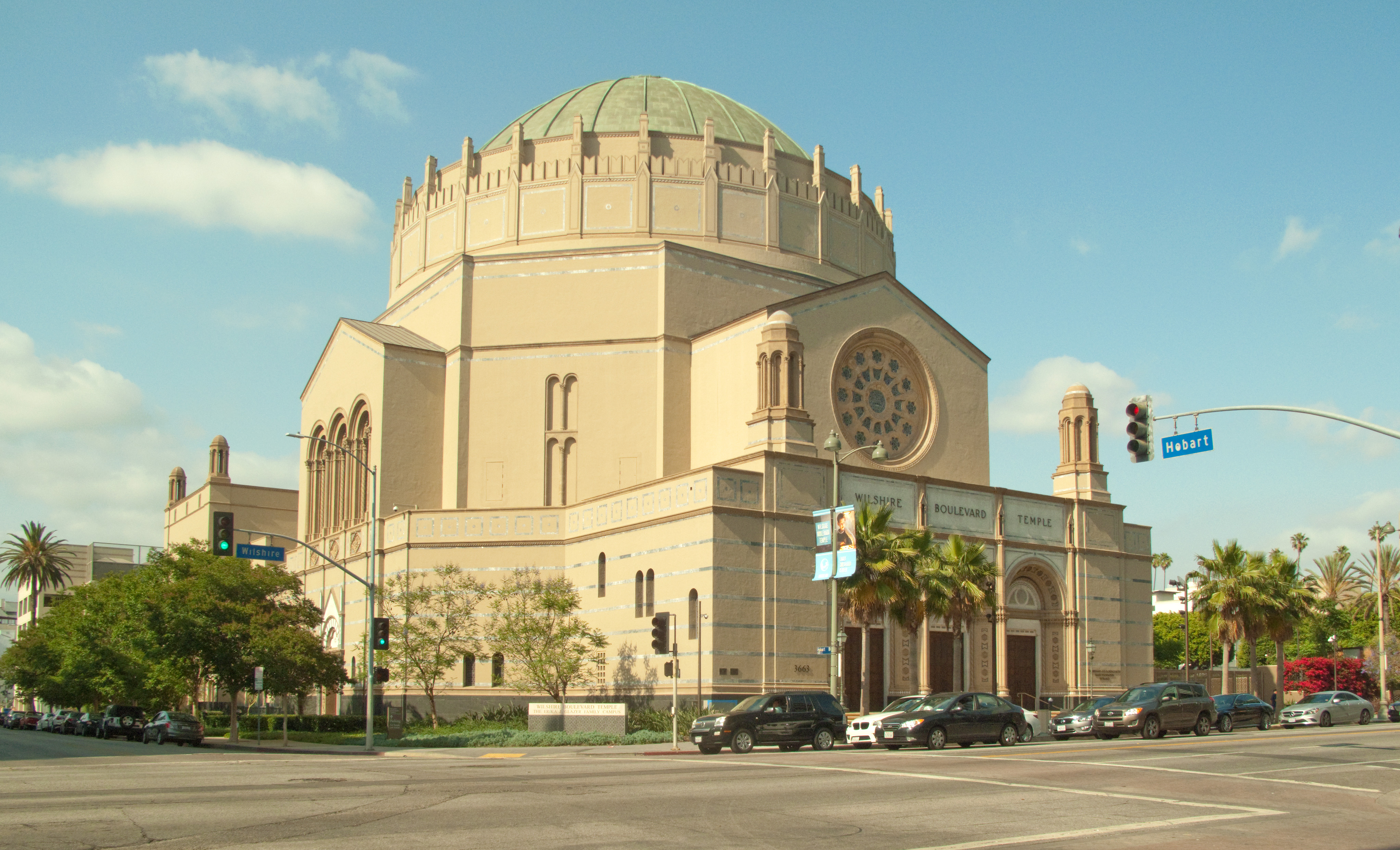
Wilshire Boulevard Temple

Norton designed many Jewish landmarks in the Los Angeles area, including:

- Sinai Temple No. 1 (1909), LAHCM No. 173
- Concordia Club (1909)
- B'nai B'rith Lodge (1923)
- Jewish Orphans Home of Southern California (1925)
- Sinai Temple No. 2 (1926), with Frederick H. Wallis, LAHCM No. 91
- Young Men's Hebrew Association, Soto and Michigan (1925), with Frederick H. Wallis
- Temple Israel (1927)
- Council of Jewish Women clubhouse (1928)
- Wilshire Boulevard Temple (1929), with Abram M. Edelman, LAHCM No. 116, NRHP No. 81000154

Other Norton works include (in Los Angeles unless otherwise noted):

- Flat building, 7th and Union (1902)
- Apartment house, Winston between Wall and San Pedro St. (1903)
- Three-flat building, California west of Hill St. (1903)
- H. M. Nichols Residence, Glendora, California (1903)

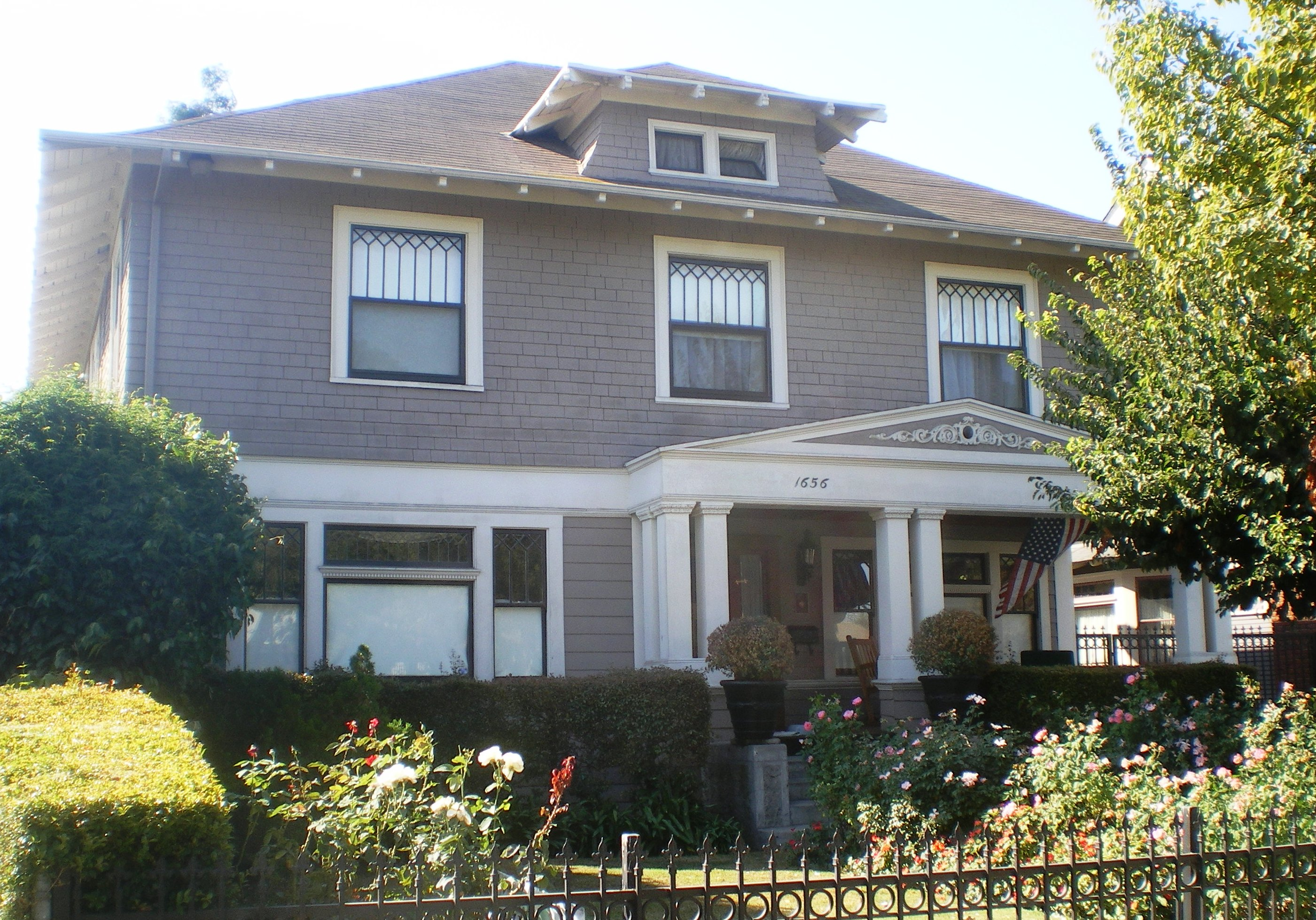
Residence at 1656 W. 25th Street

- Residence at 1656 W. 25th St. (1905)
- Amestoy Residence at 1659 S. Hobart Blvd. (1903)
- Central Department Store (1906-7, demolished prior to 1930)
- Norton Block, Maricopa, California (1910)
- Apartment building, 4th between Crocker and San Pedro St. (1912)
- Allen Hotel, Pier & Ocean Front, Santa Monica, California (1913)
- Southern California Gas Co. Headquarters (1913)
- Office block, southeast comer of 5th and Main St. (1914)
- I. F. Norton Residence (1915)
- Hotel at Figueroa and 2nd St. (1923)
- A. E. Newman residence at 86 Fremont Pl. (1929)
- William Fox Office Building (now Fox Jewelry Mart) (1930)
- Los Angeles Theatre (1930), with S. Charles Lee, LAHCM No. 225, NRHP-listed
- Southern California Telephone Company building (1931 remodel)

=== With Frederick H. Wallis ===
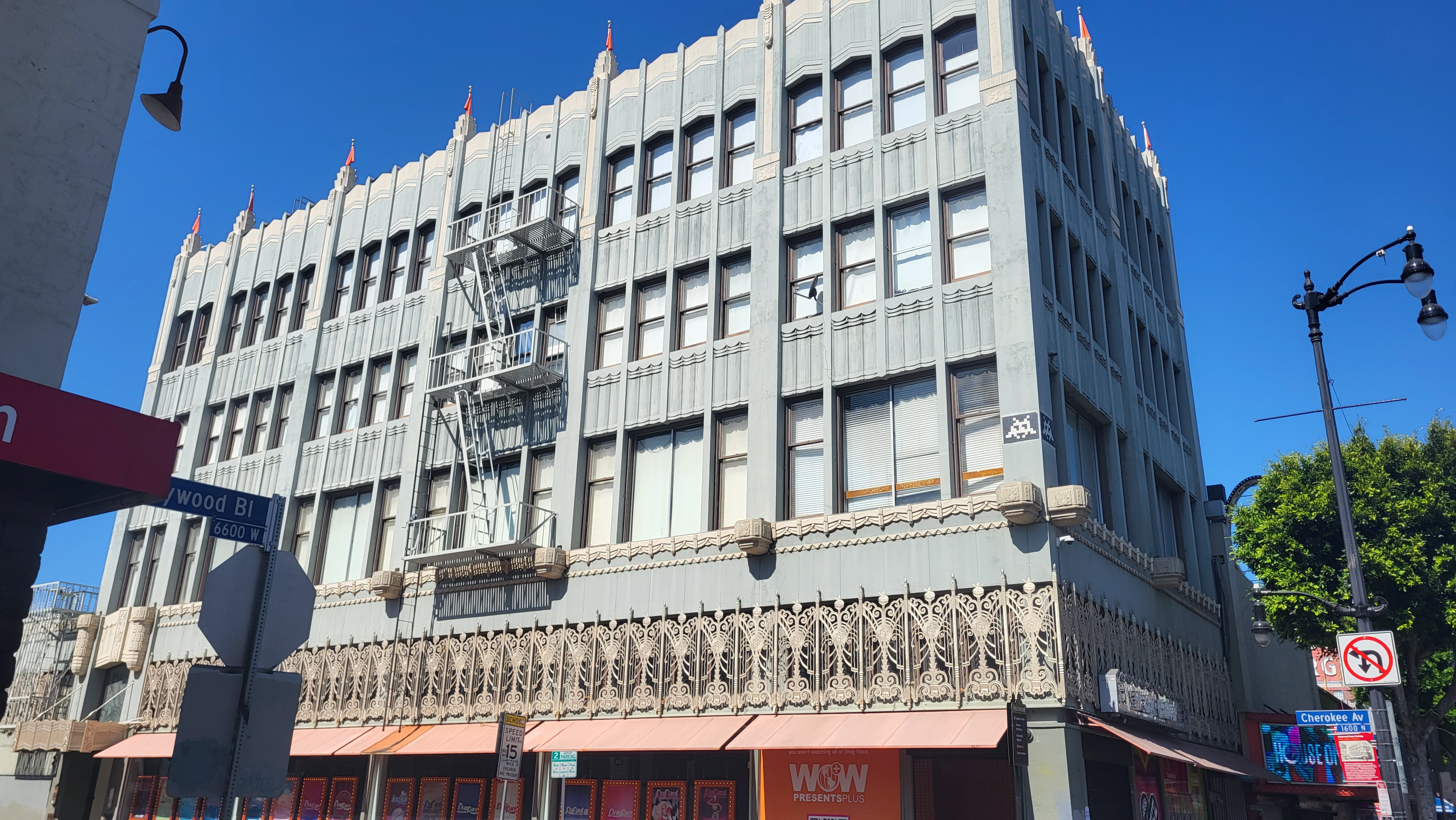
Shane Building

- Financial Center Building (1924), NRHP-listed
- Greek Theatre (1929–30)
- Shane Building (1930), NRHP-listed
- Ritz Theatre, (1930)

== See also ==
- List of American architects
- List of people from Los Angeles
