= Yes L.A. =

1979 compilation EP by various artists

Compilation album EP by various artists
- Released: August 1979
- Recorded: 1978–1979
- Genre: Punk rock
- Length: 13:26
- Label: Dangerhouse

Professional ratings
Review scores
Source	Rating
The Vinyl District	A

Yes L.A. is a six-song compilation EP featuring first-generation Californian punk rock bands. It was also the final release of the short-lived but influential Dangerhouse Records label.

== Overview ==
A one-sided picture disc released at the twilight of the early Los Angeles punk scene, (Note: "Just as the scene was being split into harder-driving, superadrenalized extreme power metal-punk on one side and simpy new wave power pop on the other, the first L.A. punk compilation album, ... Yes L.A., was released..." – Brendan Mullen) Yes L.A. features some of its most acclaimed bands: the Bags, the Eyes, the Alley Cats, Black Randy and the Metrosquad, X, and the Germs.

The record title makes parody of No New York, (Note: Antilles #AN-7067) the seminal no wave compilation album issued a year earlier, perceived as pretentious by West Coast punkers. The EP even included a satirical disclaimer printed on the disc saying: "Not produced by Brian Eno".

The compilation includes a 1978 rawer early version of X's song "Los Angeles", described by Dangerhouse Records co-founder David Brown as "a scathing, literal depiction of the scene which needs no explanation". The record also features a rare alternate mix of the Germs' "No God", a song originally produced by Geza X (Note: "... We [Dangerhouse Records] were kind of feuding with him [Geza X] about some of his production techniques, which at the time was squirrelly because he's such a creative guy and he'd try anything. So we had taken the tapes of the Germs that Slash magazine owned and remixed them the way we would do it – sort of the Geza way. It was interesting to compare..." – David Brown) for the EP Lexicon Devil, (Note: Slash #SCAM 101) previously released in May 1978.

The Yes L.A. EP has become highly sought after by record collectors.

== Production and release ==
Yes L.A. was mastered by Jeff Sanders at Crystal Sound Studios in Hollywood, California.

All songs on the compilation were previously unissued, with the only exception of Black Randy and the Metrosquad's tune "Down at the Laundrymat", featured on the band's studio album Pass the Dust, I Think I'm Bowie (Note: Dangerhouse #PCP-725) from July 1979.

Yes L.A. was originally released in August 1979 on Dangerhouse Records, in a limited edition of 2,000 copies pressed on 12-inch clear vinyl discs. (Note: Dangerhouse #EW-79)

== Artwork and packaging ==
Designed by Pat Garrett, the record artwork was silkscreened by hand on the ungrooved side of each single disc, with one of three different color combinations, namely, green/black, green/blue, and green/red. Some of those copies were misprinted. (Note: 20 or 30, according to David Brown from Dangerhouse Records.) Examples include discs with text only, with the background image in front of the text, or the image and text on the side with the grooves, rendering such a record unplayable.

Some non-silkscreened black vinyl test pressings are known to exist.

Original copies came without a sleeve, instead packaged in a clear plastic bag with a white cardboard backing.

== Reissues ==
At some point during the 1990s, the rights to Yes L.A. (and the entire Dangerhouse Records catalog) were acquired by Frontier Records.

In June 2013, after 34 years out of print, Yes L.A. was reissued by Frontier in a one-time limited edition of 1,000 almost exact replicas of the original EP (Note: Frontier #FLP 31079) to commemorate the label's 100th release.

== Track listing ==
Where it is necessary, songwriting credits are listed in the format lyrics/music.

No.	Title	Writer(s)	Artist	Length
1.	"We Don't Need the English"	Craig Lee	Bags	1:13
2.	"Disneyland"	Joe Ramirez, John Richey/Ramirez	Eyes	2:00
3.	"Too Much Junk" (Dangerhouse version)	Randy Stodola	The Alley Cats	2:41
4.	"Down at the Laundrymat"	Black Randy/Bob Deadwyler	Black Randy and the Metrosquad	3:26
5.	"Los Angeles" (Dangerhouse version)	John Doe	X	2:12
6.	"No God" (Dangerhouse mix)	Darby Crash	Germs	1:54
Total length:				13:26

== Personnel ==
Bags

- Alicia Armendariz (pka Alice Bag) – vocals
- Patricia Morrison (pka Pat Bag) – bass
- Craig Lee (pka Craig Bag) – guitar
- Rob Ritter – guitar
- Terry Graham (pka Terry Dad Bag) – drums

Eyes

- Joe Ramirez – vocals, guitar
- Jimmy Leach – bass, backing vocals
- Joe Nanini – drums
- David Brown – organ

The Alley Cats

- Randy Stodola – vocals, guitar
- Dianne Chai – vocals, bass
- John McCarthy – drums

Black Randy and the Metrosquad

- Black Randy – vocals
- Bob Deadwyler – guitar
- Keith Barrett (aka KK Barrett) – drums
- Pat Garrett – bass
- David Brown – electric piano
- John Duchac (pka John Doe) – percussions (wastebasket)

X

- Exene Cervenka – vocals
- Billy Zoom – guitar
- John Doe – bass, vocals
- Don Bonebrake – drums

Germs

- Darby Crash – vocals
- Pat Smear – guitar
- Lorna Doom – bass
- Nicky Beat – drums
- Don Bolles – backing vocals and hand clapping
- Pat Delaney – backing vocals and hand clapping

Production

- Dangerhouse – production (track 4), co-production (1 to 3, 5), remixing (6)
- Geza X – production (6), co-production (1)
- Eyes – co-production (2)
- Randy Stodola – co-production (3)
- Jimmy Nanos – co-production (5), engineering (5)
- Pat Rand (Pat Garrett) – co-production (5), graphic design
- X – co-production (5)
- Mike Hamilton – engineering (4)
- Jeff Sanders – mastering

== See also ==
- 1979 in music
- Punk rock in California
