= The Alley Cats (punk rock band) =

Punk rock band

- Origin: Los Angeles, California, United States
- Genres: Punk
- Years active: 1977–1982, 2015–present
- Labels: Dangerhouse, Time Coast
- Members: Randy Stodola, Apryl Cady, Matt Laskey
- Past members: Dianne Chai, John McCarthy later members as The Zarkons: Terry Cooley, Freda Rente reformations after 2010: Paula O'Rourke, Pam Jag, Malti Kennedy, Joe Barile

The Alley Cats are a Los Angeles, California-based punk rock trio formed in 1977. The original line-up, featuring Randy Stodola (guitar and vocals), Dianne Chai (bass and vocals) and John McCarthy (drums), was a fixture of the early L.A. punk rock scene. Signed to Dangerhouse Records alongside other seminal California-based punk bands including the Bags, Black Randy and the Metro Squad, and X, they released their first single "Nothing Means Nothing Anymore" backed with "Give Me a Little Pain" on March 30, 1978. They are among the six bands featured on the 1979 compilation album Yes L.A. and appear in the 1982 film Urgh! A Music War.

The Alley Cats were regular performers at such Los Angeles venues as Club 88, Hong Kong Café, The Masque, and the Whisky a Go Go. Music writer Chris Morris remarked that the band "made some of the toughest, most nihilistic music on the scene."

Reformed as "The Zarkons", they released two albums, Riders In The Long Black Parade (1985) and Between the Idea & the Reality...Falls the Shadow (1988), before disbanding in 1988.

After a 20-year hiatus, Stodola reformed the trio and currently performs as The Alley Cats along with fellow North Dakota-native Apryl Cady (bass and vocals) and Matt Laskey (drums). The line-up appears on the 2020 compilation album SPIKE: A San Pedro Compilation as well as the 2025 album We All Walk Among Shadows Until We Become One. Live performances include songs from the band's early albums as well as covers and new material.

== Discography ==
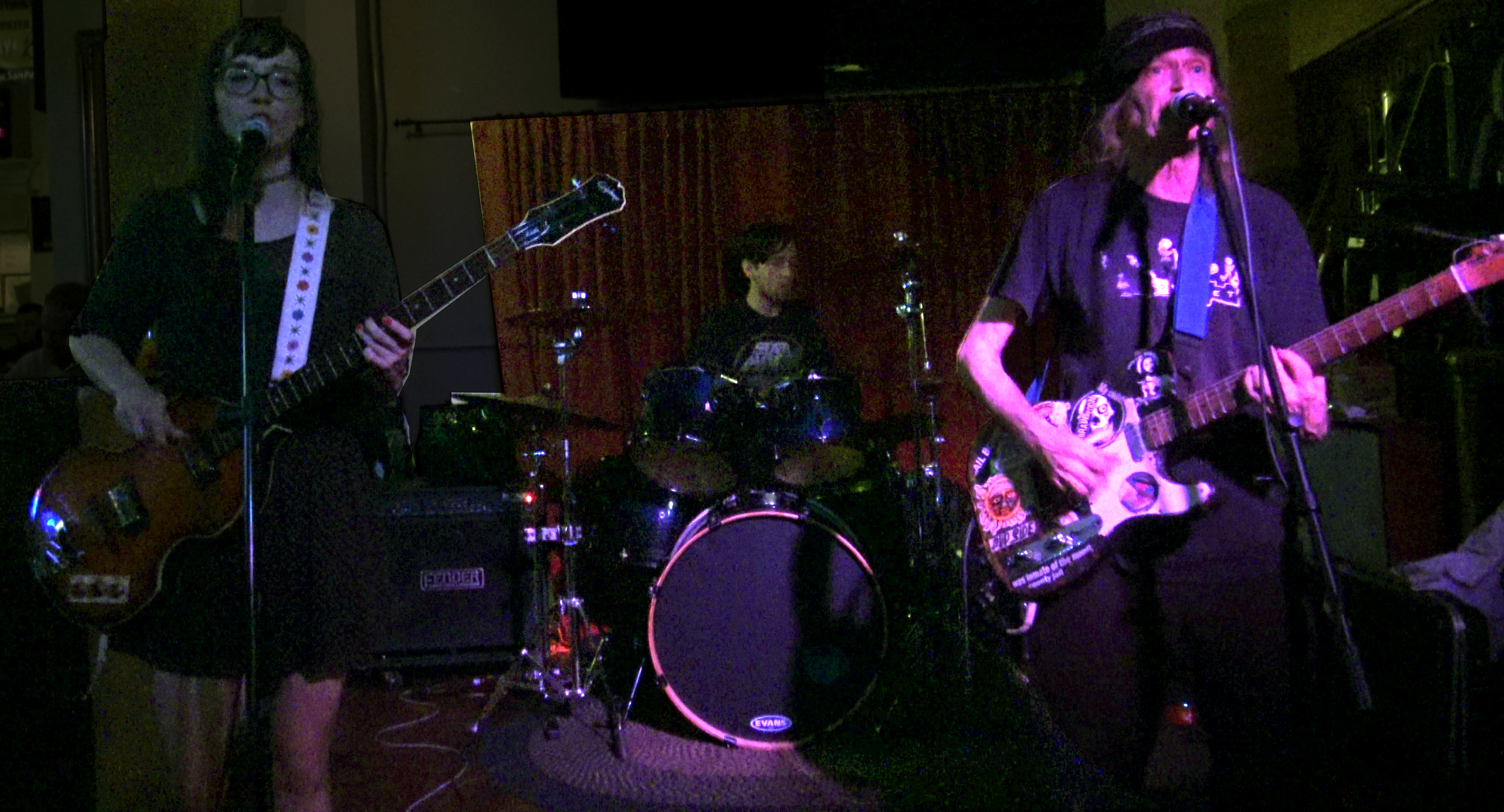
The Alley Cats at the San Pedro Brewing Company in San Pedro, California, June 18, 2016 L-R Apryl Cady, Matt Laskey, Randy Stodola

=== Albums ===
- 1981 - Nightmare City
- 1982 - Escape From The Planet Earth
- 1985 - Riders In The Long Black Parade (as The Zarkons)
- 1988 - Between the Idea & the Reality…Falls the Shadow (as The Zarkons)
- 2007 - 1979-1982 (Anthology)
- 2025 - We All Walk Among Shadows Until We Become One

=== Singles and EPs ===
- 1978 - Nothing Means Nothing Anymore
- 1980 - Too Much Junk

=== Soundtracks and compilations ===
- 1979 - Yes L.A. (compilation)
- 1981 - Urgh! A Music War (soundtrack)
- 1991 - Dangerhouse, Vol. 1 (compilation)
- 1993 - Dangerhouse, Vol. 2: Give Me A Little Pain! (compilation)
- 1993 - We're Desperate: The L.A. Scene 1976-79 (compilation) - "Nothing Means Nothing Anymore"
- 1996 - Live From the Masque, Vol. 2: We We Can Can Do Do What What (compilation)
- 2020 - SPIKE: A San Pedro Compilation (compilation)

== Filmography ==
- 1981 - Urgh! A Music War
- 2011 - The Alley Cats Live at the Whisky A Go Go
