= Dianne Chai =

American musician

- Genres: Punk rock
- Occupation: Musician
- Instrument(s): Bass, vocals
- Years active: 1977-1988
- Labels: Dangerhouse, Time Coast

Dianne Chai is an American bass player. She was one of the founders of the L.A. punk rock band The Alley Cats.

== Career ==
Chai formed The Alley Cats with then-husband Randy Stodola and drummer John McCarthy.

Chris Morris (former senior writer at Billboard, music editor at The Hollywood Reporter and critic at The Los Angeles Reader), writing in John Doe's book Under the Big Black Sun: A Personal History of L.A. Punk said, "They made some of the toughest, most nihilistic music on the scene." Violence at shows featuring bands such as the Bags and The Alley Cats caused Madame Wong's restaurant to stop featuring punk bands and switch to slower tempo new wave acts.

Chai along with ex-Alley Cats John McCarthy and Randy Stodola formed The Zarkons in 1985 for which Chai sang and played bass.

Chai eventually remarried to the manager of The Alley Cats, Marshall Berle, and began working as a travel agent in Florida.
