= Club 88 =

Music venue in Los Angeles, US (1977–1990)

Coordinates: 34°1′50″N 118°26′50″W

- Address: 11784 W. Pico Blvd. Los Angeles; United States
- Capacity: 250
- Opened: July 1977
- Closed: March 1990

Club 88 was an all-ages live music venue that was a key part of the early Los Angeles punk scene in the late 1970s and early 1980s. Many seminal punk and New Wave groups got their start playing shows there.

== History ==
Club 88 — named after a popular Tokyo nightclub from the early 1960s — was founded in July 1977 by Wayne Mayotte in a rundown former strip club located on Pico Boulevard in Los Angeles's Westside. Mayotte, a 57-year-old recently retired engineer at the time, intended to curate jazz lineups, but he quickly found a following hosting acts from the burgeoning New Wave and punk scenes. Notable acts that took the stage during the club's run include The Blasters, The Motels, Black Flag, the Go-Go's, Social Distortion, Minutemen, the Gun Club, Firehose, Saint Vitus, Jawbreaker, Red Kross, Berlin, and X.

== Closure ==
The venue closed its doors in March 1990 after the building that housed it was sold. It was one of many L.A. punk venues that closed its doors around this time, including Club Lingerie (1991) and Madame Wong's West (1991). The building has since been torn down.
