= World of Wonder (company) =

American production company

- Type: Private
- Industry: Entertainment
- Founded: 1991; 35 years ago
- Founder: Randy Barbato; Fenton Bailey
- Headquarters: Los Angeles, California, United States
- Services: Film production; Film distribution; Television production; Television distribution
- Website: www.worldofwonder.com

World of Wonder Productions (WOW) is an American production company founded in 1991 by filmmakers Randy Barbato and Fenton Bailey. Based in Los Angeles, California, the company specializes in documentary television and film productions with a key focus on LGBTQ topics. Together, Barbato and Bailey have produced programming through World of Wonder for HBO, Bravo, HGTV, Showtime, BBC, Netflix, MTV and VH1, with credits including the Million Dollar Listing docuseries, RuPaul's Drag Race, and the documentary films The Eyes of Tammy Faye (2000) and Mapplethorpe: Look at the Pictures (2016).

World of Wonder is best known for its contributions towards LGBTQ programming, for which they won an Outfest Annual Achievement Award in 2011. Their most well known production is RuPaul's Drag Race. They have managed the career of drag queen and titular host RuPaul since the early 1990s, eventually producing the television franchise alongside the majority of its live shows, podcasts, television specials, and conventions.

== History ==
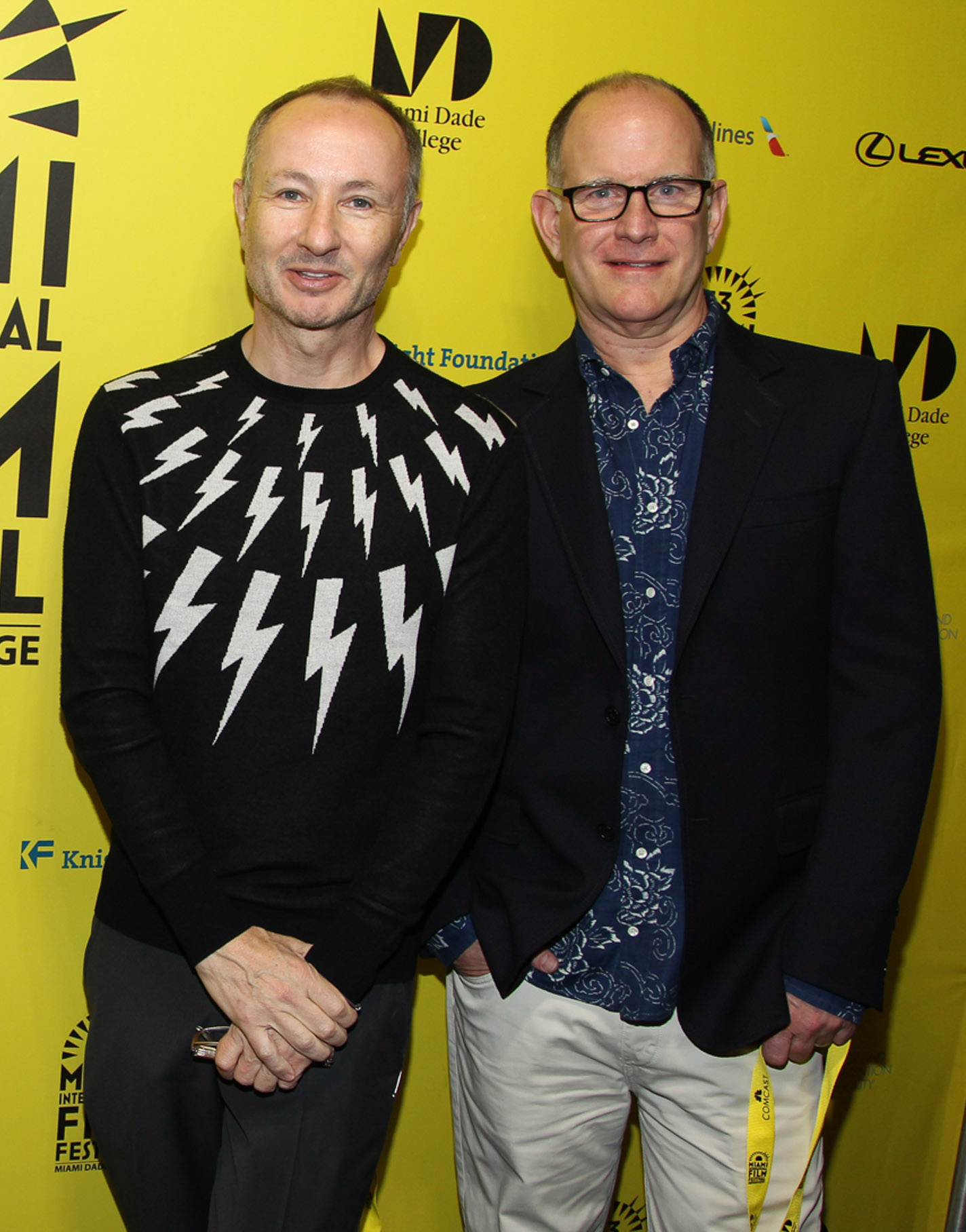
Filmmakers Randy Barbato and Fenton Bailey at the Miami International Film Festival presentation of Mapplethorpe: Look at the Pictures (2016). Photo: David Heischrek

World of Wonder was co-founded as a record label and management company by Barbato and Bailey in the mid-1980s after meeting in New York University's (NYU) graduate film program, with the name coming from a British magazine Bailey used to read as a child. The two formed Fabulous Pop Tarts, a disco-pop rock duo, and began performing regularly at Danceteria and other clubs in downtown New York City. They produced two albums, Age of the Thing, which included their hit single New York City Beat, and Gagging on the Lovely Extravaganza, which included guest appearances by Lady Miss Kier, RuPaul, Martyn Phillips, and Filthy the Dog.

Barbato and Bailey moved on to begin organizing projects in television production and licensing, documentary filmmaking, and the career expansion of their friends and fellow artists, particularly RuPaul, whom they met in Atlanta in the 1980s. They produced RuPaul's first album, RuPaul is: StarBooty!, in 1986, and became his manager shortly after launching World of Wonder in 1991. They have since produced all of his television shows, his DragCon bi-coastal conventions and music productions, and have earned multiple Emmy Awards.

One of Barbato and Bailey's early television documentaries, Died on the 4th of July: Nelson Sullivan's World of Wonder, shares its name with the production company. The documentary, a one-hour portrait of Nelson Sullivan, was created from an archive of over 1,200 hours of video footage taken over the decade preceding Sullivan's death of a heart attack on July 4, 1989. Died on the 4th of July aired on the UK's Channel 4, was included on the DVD release of Party Monster: The Shockumentary, and contributed to Sullivan's posthumous rise in notoriety. The early focus on Sullivan solidified the company's interest in documentary filmmaking. In 2014, Barbato and Bailey were honored with the International Documentary Association's (IDA) Pioneer Award, "celebrating exceptional achievement, leadership, and vision in the nonfiction and documentary community."

World of Wonder operates out of the Shane Building on Hollywood Boulevard. Designed by architects S. Tilden Norton and Fredrick H. Wallis and erected in 1930, the building served as the original home of the Directors Guild of America. The World of Wonder Storefront Gallery now occupies the ground floor retail space, with production and management offices occupying the upper three stories. The basement, once home to the punk rock club The Masque, now houses the company's video archive and a soundstage.

== Television ==
World of Wonder primarily produces television content for networks in the US and UK, including BBC, Channel 4, FIVE, HBO, Cinemax, TLC, PBS, Showtime, A&E, MTV, VH1 and Bravo. Productions over the past three decades include RuPaul's Drag Race, Manhattan Cable with Laurie Pike, Takeover TV, The Adam and Joe Show,Tori & Dean: Inn Love, Good Work, Million Dollar Listing, Heli-Loggers, Pam: Girl on the Loose, Big Freedia: Queen of Bounce, and Island Hunters. World of Wonder also produced the documentary series One Punk Under God, Sex Change Hospital, and TransGeneration, one of the first unscripted television shows to focus on the transgender community, which won the 2006 GLAAD Award for Outstanding Documentary.

Another franchise by World of Wonder, Million Dollar Listing, debuted in Los Angeles in 2006, and has since expanded to include New York, San Francisco, and Miami series. The spin-off, Sell It Like Serhant, featuring one of Million Dollar Listing New York's top brokers, Ryan Serhant, launched in 2018. In 2021, Barbato and Bailey produced and directed Catch and Kill: The Podcast Tapes and Small Town News: KPVM Pahrump for HBO. The company has received several Emmy Awards nominations for their documentary programming.

=== RuPaul's Drag Race ===
World of Wonder produced The RuPaul Show, hosted by RuPaul from 1996 until 1998. The company partnered with RuPaul to pitch the reality television show RuPaul's Drag Race to Logo TV, which was immediately picked up for a season and aired in February 2009. The company also produced multiple spinoff series:

- RuPaul's Drag U, which lasted for three seasons from 2010 until 2012
- RuPaul's Drag Race: All Stars, beginning in 2012 and featuring returning drag queens
- RuPaul's Drag Race: Untucked, a behind-the scenes after show aired following each new episode of the original series

World of Wonder's work in television has been honored with over two dozen Emmy nominations, including multiple wins for RuPaul's Drag Race. The show has notably received awards for Outstanding Reality Competition Program and Outstanding Host for a Reality or Competition Program.

== Documentary films ==
World of Wonder has produced many feature-length documentary films, many focusing on provocative subjects, several of which have garnered industry awards and nominations. These include Inside Deep Throat, which premiered at Sundance Film Festival, HBO biopic Wishful Drinking, starring Carrie Fisher, which received two Emmy nominations, and Becoming Chaz, which premiered at Sundance as the Oprah Winfrey Network's (OWN) first ever documentary and was nominated for three Emmy awards.

World of Wonder has also produced feature films Party Monster, starring Macaulay Culkin and Seth Green, and Menendez: Blood Brothers, starring Courtney Love, Nico Totorella, Benito Martinez, and Myko Oliver.

Barbato and Bailey have produced a host of other original documentaries, including Party Monster: The Shockumentary, The Eyes of Tammy Faye, Monica in Black and White, Gender Revolution with Katie Couric, and The Last Beekeeper. In 2017, Out of Iraq, a documentary chronicling the relationship between two soldiers serving in Iraq won a daytime Emmy for Logo TV. In March 2018, the documentary When the Beat Drops, directed by Jamal Sims, premiered at the Miami International Film Festival, where it won the Knight Documentary Achievement Award. In 2018, World of Wonder produced and directed Liberty: Mother of Exiles, an HBO documentary examining the history of the Statue of Liberty. The company was also commissioned by YouTube to create Stonewall Outloud, a documentary based on the Stonewall protests of 1969, using the audio recordings of StoryCorps founder, Dave Isay.

== Content ==
Over the years, World of Wonder has expanded its presence into new media types, including conventions, video-on-demand, social media, and blogging. The WOW Report, a blog providing daily coverage of the pop culture and nightlife sectors, was named Best Counter Culture Blog by LA Weekly in 2011.

In 2015, World of Wonder added conventions to their portfolio with the launch of RuPaul's DragCon LA, located at the Los Angeles Convention Center. The company is also responsible for RuPaul's DragCon NYC, launched in 2017 and hosted in Javits Convention Center. The New York City edition of the convention is the largest collection of drag art and culture in the world, with over 50,000 attendees in its sold-out first year. DragCon and World of Wonder expanded to London in 2020 with RuPaul's DragCon UK. During the COVID-19 pandemic, DragCon LA was hosted online as Digital DragCon.

In January 2020, the production company began their first Las Vegas Strip residency, RuPaul's Drag Race Live!, where former contestants from the Drag Race franchise perform at the Flamingo Las Vegas, directed by RuPaul and Jamal Sims. World of Wonder also has a YouTube channel with the name WOWPresents, which features over 5,000 videos and has more than 1.9 million subscribers.

== WOWIE Awards ==
First introduced in 2013, the WOWIE Awards are World of Wonder's tribute to the best in LGBTQIA+ entertainment, trailblazers, activism, artistry, and pop culture. The awards coincided with World of Wonder's annual holiday party until 2022, when they included it as a closing event at DragCon LA. Since 2020, the awards ceremony is streamed live on the WOWPresents YouTube channel. Categories include Best Drag Queen Music Video, Best Red Carpet Look, Best Breakout Star, Best Blog or Website and Best LGBTQ Comedian.

== WOW Presents Plus ==
In November 2017, World of Wonder launched the subscription streaming service WOW Presents Plus. The service contains a multitude of original series and live events spanning the realm of pop culture and LGBTQ society. Exclusive original series include: Sketchy Queens, UNHhhh, and Painted with Raven. The service is also the main international distributor in some regions for RuPaul's Drag Race and the international versions of the franchise. It also includes many web series found on WOWPresents' YouTube channel, such as Detox's Life Rehab and La Vida de Valentina.

== Awards and nominations ==
- Best Counter Culture Blog, awarded to The WOW Report by LA Weekly in 2011.
- Television Critics Association (TCA) Award for Outstanding Achievement in Reality Programming, awarded to RuPaul's Drag Race in 2014.
- GLAAD Media Award for Outstanding Reality Program, awarded to Big Freedia in 2014.
- IDA Pioneer Award, awarded to Barbato and Bailey in 2014.
- Nomination for Emmy Award for Outstanding Unstructured Reality Program, Million Dollar Listing: New York, 2015.
- Nomination for Emmy Award for Outstanding Cinematography For A Nonfiction Program and Outstanding Documentary or Nonfiction Special, Mapplethorpe: Look at the Pictures, 2016.
- Daytime Emmy Award for Outstanding Special Class Special, awarded to Out of Iraq in 2017.
- RuPaul's Drag Race has been nominated for twenty-nine Emmy Awards and has won thirteen, including Outstanding Host for a Reality or Competition Program in 2016 and the same award in 2017 along with Outstanding Makeup for a Variety, Nonfiction or Reality Program and Outstanding Picture Editing for a Structured Reality or Competition Program.
- Knight Documentary Achievement Award, awarded to When the Beat Drops in 2017.
- 2 Streamy Awards nominations for Show of the Year in 2017 and Best Unscripted Series in 2019, UNHhhh.
