= Punk rock in California =

Overview of punk rock in the U.S. state of California

Since the mid-1970s, California has had thriving regional punk rock movements. It primarily consists of bands from the Los Angeles, Orange County, Ventura County, San Diego, San Fernando Valley, San Francisco, Fresno, Bakersfield, Alameda County, Sacramento, Lake Tahoe, Oakland and Berkeley areas.

== History ==
=== Pre-1976 ===
Los Angeles had a very strong glam rock scene in the early 1970s, mostly centered on the club Rodney Bingenheimer's English Disco, run by Rodney Bingenheimer, who later, as a disc jockey for KROQ's Rodney on the ROQ radio show, did much to promote LA punk bands. Many figures from this earlier scene would play notable roles in the later punk scene.

In the mid-1970s from 1974 to 1975 a wave of proto-punk bands emerged from Los Angeles, including the Flyboys and Atomic Kid.

The Runaways, an all-female teenaged band featuring Joan Jett, Sandy West, and Micki Steele, formed in Los Angeles in 1975 under the management of Kim Fowley. The band combined elements of glam rock, hard rock, and proto-punk rock. The group would become one of the first punk or punk-adjacent bands anywhere to release recordings, with their self-titled debut LP and its single "Cherry Bomb" released the following year.

=== 1976–1979 ===
Starting in 1976, following recent releases of recordings by punk bands such as the Ramones, a number of punk bands formed in the Los Angeles and Orange County area. Among these bands were the Dils (originally from Carlsbad),the Zeros (originally from Chula Vista), the Weirdos, the Screamers, the Germs, the Dickies, Nervous Gender, Bags, X, Black Randy and the Metrosquad and the Go-Go's. Many bands also formed in the San Francisco Bay, including The Nuns, Crime, Avengers, Negative Trend, The Mutants, The Sleepers, The Offs and Dead Kennedys. California punk of this period was musically very eclectic, and the punk scene of the time included a number of bands whose sound crossed over to art punk, experimental punk, new wave, electropunk, punk-funk, rockabilly, deathrock and hard rock.

The Damned's first Los Angeles visit in April 1977 became an early rallying point for the city's punk scene. The Weirdos used the Damned's crowded appearance at Bomp! to promote their self-booked show at the Orpheum Theatre later that night. Among those who came to see the Damned were Bobby Pyn, Pat Smear, Lorna Doom, and Donna Rhia of the newly formed Germs. When Pyn and Smear claimed that the Germs were ready to play, the boast became a challenge, and the Weirdos added them to the Orpheum bill. That night, the Germs gave their first live performance. Captain Sensible also joined the Weirdos for "Pushin' Too Hard"; the November 1977 issue of Bomp! later called the concert a "now-legendary show". Cornell University Library's history of the scene calls the Orpheum concert punk's "spectacular start" in Los Angeles.

When the Damned's planned Whisky a Go Go appearance with Television fell through, Tomata du Plenty and The Screamers housed the stranded band at the Wilton Hilton. Stan Lee of The Dickies secured a last-minute booking that brought the Damned and The Quick to the Starwood on April 18 and 19. Alice Bag recalled that much of the Orpheum audience returned for the Damned two days later. To Bag, the speed with which word spread and the replacement show filled demonstrated that Los Angeles's scattered punks were becoming a scene.

The Starwood audience included Joan Jett, Clem Burke, Chris Stein, Leonard Phillips, Pleasant Gehman, and Robert Lopez, whose later accounts captured the concert's spectacle, its challenge to conventional rock performance, and the burst of band formation that followed the Orpheum and Starwood shows. Burke remembered that "all hell was breaking loose on stage": Rat Scabies set fire to the cymbals while Captain Sensible appeared in a tutu. As the performance erupted, Jett removed a studded belt and swung it around while the group shouted from the balcony. With flames rising from the cymbals, Burke characterized the scene as "pretty much perfect chaos." A contemporary review in Slash similarly emphasized the band's speed, theatrical presentation, instrumental force, and rejection of polished rock convention. Phillips contrasted the Damned's short, disorderly set with the long songs, instrumental solos, and emphasis on expensive equipment that had previously shaped his idea of a rock performance. Gehman described the night as a personal turning point, while Lopez associated the Orpheum and Starwood shows with a rush of audience members starting bands. John Doe of X, who lived in the apartment opposite the Starwood, remembered the Damned's debut there as one of the defining shows witnessed from that apartment. Photographer Jenny Lens recalled Rodney Bingenheimer joining Captain Sensible onstage at the Starwood. Lens also stressed the importance of Rodney on the ROQ as the radio program through which Los Angeles punk listeners heard new records and learned about concerts. Melanie Nissen connected the visit with the launch and visual direction of Slash, which became central to the first-wave Los Angeles scene.

==== Emergence of hardcore punk ====
In 1978 in Southern California, the first hardcore punk bands arose, including Middle Class, Black Flag, Vicious Circle, Fear, and the Circle Jerks. Hardcore bands and fans tended to be younger than the art punks of the older LA scene and came mainly from the suburban parts of the Los Angeles area, especially the South Bay and Orange County. This resulted in a rivalry between the older artsy "Hollywood" scene and the hardcore "suburban", "surf punk", or "beach punk" scene. Those in the "Hollywood" scene often disliked what they saw as the musical narrowness of hardcore and the violence associated with "suburban" punks (the South Bay and Orange County punk scenes had a particular reputation for violence), while the "suburban" punks looked down on what they perceived as the lack of intensity of older "Hollywood" bands (the Germs being a notable exception with lead singer Darby Crash) and the fashion consciousness of "Hollywood" punks.

The Penelope Spheeris documentary The Decline of Western Civilization, shot in early 1979 and early 1980, documents the period when the older LA punk scene was being completely taken over by hardcore. It features performances by bands from both scenes. Decline was filmed in part at punk shows sponsored and promoted by David Ferguson, who in 1979 formed CD Presents, a label that would record and promote a number of pioneering groups from the California punk scene. Ferguson and CD Presents organized New Wave 1980, the first festival gathering and showcasing punk bands from all over the West Coast.

By 1979, hardcore had displaced the Hollywood scene and become the dominant expression called hardcore punk in both Northern and Southern California. By this time, many of the older punk bands had broken up or become relatively inactive. A few of these, such as X and The Go-Go's, went on to mainstream success as punk or new wave bands.

=== 1980–1984 ===
By the early 1980s, hardcore was the dominant form of punk music in California. Notable hardcore bands active in that period included the Circle Jerks, Black Flag, the Adolescents, Minutemen, Descendents, T.S.O.L., China White, Agent Orange, the Vandals, Love Canal, Wasted Youth, Social Distortion, D.I., White Mice, Channel 3 (band), Dr. Know, the Mentors and NOFX in Southern California, and the Dead Kennedys, Flipper, MDC, and Verbal Abuse in the San Francisco Bay Area.

Despite the dominance of hardcore during this period, punk also began to diversify. Agent Orange had a noticeable surf rock influence, while the Angry Samoans were strongly influenced by 1960s garage rock. Other bands such as the Joneses and Tex and the Horseheads became popular for playing a form of punk rock influenced by simple rock n roll without the ultra-fast beat of most hardcore bands.

Black Flag, T.S.O.L., Fear, D.I., the Adolescents, Suicidal Tendencies, D.R.I. and others influenced later metal bands such as Anthrax, Slayer and Metallica. These hardcore bands also created a crossover sound: the genres of thrash and early metalcore grew out of this fusion.

The hardcore scene, particularly in Los Angeles and Orange County, gained a reputation for violence at shows due to the formation of several hardcore punk gangs. The topic of violence at punk concerts was featured in episodes of the popular television shows CHiPs and Quincy, M.E., in which Los Angeles hardcore punks were depicted as being involved in murder and mayhem. In the early 1980s, punk concerts increasingly became sites of violent battles between police and concertgoers, particularly in Los Angeles, but also in San Francisco. Henry Rollins argued that, in his experience, the police caused far more problems than they solved at punk performances. At one point, Black Flag was in fact under heavy surveillance by police who were convinced that the band was the cover for a drug ring.

Cities like Sacramento, Lake Tahoe and neighboring Reno, Nevada followed San Francisco and Los Angeles, creating their own underground hardcore scenes. Local promoter Stuart Katz brought punk rock to Sacramento in the early 1980s, starting off with shows in auditoriums at McKinley Park. Katz eventually opened Club Minimal in South Sacramento, booking early hardcore acts such as Black Flag, Circle Jerks, Flipper and Crucifix, as well as local bands. The police department soon shut down the club, but Katz led a 1960s style peaceful protest inside the lobby of City Hall, joined by more than a hundred punk rockers. The protest made the cover page of the Sacramento Union.

==== Nardcore ====
Nardcore is a hardcore punk movement that originated in the Oxnard suburbs of Silver Strand Beach and Port Hueneme. Early bands of the nardcore scene include Agression, Dr. Know, False Confession, Ill Repute, Habeas Corpus, Stalag 13, RKL and Scared Straight.

Around 1977, the first group in the area was a Moorpark band called the Rotters, emulating the new sounds of English punk rock. After playing a few parties for high school age audiences, Agression latched onto the style. The younger, future members of Dr. Know and Ill Repute were in the audiences saying "Oh, we can do that."

The first venues to regularly host punk shows in the Oxnard area were Casa Tropical (a Quonset hut at the Oxnard Airport), Town and Country (Port Hueneme), Skate Palace (Port Hueneme), and Casa de la Raza (Santa Barbara).

The local skate scene played heavily in the scene, many people riding in backyard half pipes or breaking into backyards with empty pools to skate. "We were all skaters before we were punkers," said Brandon Cruz, singer for several Nardcore bands.

There was and still is a strong sense of unity and community among the generations of Nardcore bands. Some unity came from the coverage by a local publication called 60 Miles North, which began in 1983 initially as a xeroxed flyer for an Alley Cats concert in nearby Camarillo. Ill Repute singer John Phaneuf says "Goldenvoice played a big role in getting the Oxnard scene big in L.A."

Much of the early promotion of nardcore was due to Mystic Records, in Hollywood, California, and its founder Doug Moody, and promotion director, Mark Wilkins. Mystic launched many bands onto vinyl which helped them form relationships with the music industry.

By combining the words "Oxnard" and "hardcore", the name is a reference to the Oxnard, California hardcore punk scene. Brandon Cruz credits Dr. Know guitarist Ismael Hernandez as the originator of the term. This coastal suburban community, sixty miles north-west of Los Angeles, California, was the spawning ground for many hardcore punk bands of the early 1980s and became a hotbed for punk and skate bands. Their collective sound became known as "Nardcore." Nardcore was popularized by the bands themselves, with a little help from Mystic records, Doug Moody and Mystic Promotion Director Mystic Mark Wilkins over a series of Vinyl Releases in the early 1980s. Nardcore tends to have a lot of the same characteristics as skate punk; however, it has a sound closer to traditional hardcore punk. A congealing of the style was the eponymous compilation LP release in 1984.

Punk music was Exploited, Discharge. The bands coming from England, and the bands that copied them were punk bands. The stuff we were producing was an original form of Californian music, thrash, or skateboard punk. It originated here.

— Doug Moody

=== 1984–1992 ===
By the mid-1980s, many major punk acts such as Black Flag and Dead Kennedys, had broken up. Other bands that had remained such as T.S.O.L. and Circle Jerks began to change their sound in favor of more hard rock or metallic directions while other bands such as D.I., Agent Orange and the Adolescents continued on with their standard Punk Rock sound and released new material throughout the mid-1980s and 1990s. In 1985, Bad Religion reemerged from a hiatus and returned to Punk Rock with their 2nd EP, Back to the Known, featuring a sound that would later be continued and expanded on with albums like Suffer and No Control. During this time period a new generation of bands emerged, influenced by their early 80s predecessors. This new scene would produce bands such as ALL, Chemical People, Guttermouth, Urban Scum, Jughead's Revenge, Lagwagon, the Offspring, Pennywise, Face to Face, and Big Drill Car, and in San Francisco, No Use for a Name, Jawbreaker, the Lookouts, and the Swingin' Utters.

In the late 1980s and early 1990s, San Diego was home to a burgeoning post-hardcore scene centered on bands like Pitchfork, Rocket From the Crypt, the Renegades and Unwritten Law. Several of these bands played important roles in the so-called math rock movement.

The Bay Area punk scene began to flourish in the late 1980s. In 1987, Matt Freeman and Tim Armstrong (future members of Rancid) started ska-punk band Operation Ivy. Other Bay Area bands were Mr. T Experience, Isocracy, Green Day, Samiam, and Crimpshrine. Over the next 20 years the Bay Area punk scene formed such influential punk bands such as Swingin Utters, Rancid, One Man Army, the Forgotten, AFI on record labels such as Sympathy for the Record Industry and Dead to Me.

While many of the second wave bands still retained the speed and anger of the first wave bands, others focused on a more melodic Ramones approach featuring lighthearted lyrics about relationships and other non-political situations.

In the early to mid-1990s, bands like Bad Religion, Social Distortion and the Offspring achieved large-scale success, being played on MTV as well as mainstream radio. Up until that point, only alternative format FM stations like KROQ 106.7 in Los Angeles, KWOD 106.5 in Sacramento, 91X in San Diego, Live 105 in San Francisco and Channel 92.3 in San Jose, as well as local public and college radio stations such as KDVS 90.3 in Davis played punk music.

=== 1993-2004 ===
In 1989, Social Distortion signed with Epic Records becoming the first band from the scene, since the Dickies in the late 1970s, to get a major label deal. Their album, simply titled Social Distortion became a minor hit with four singles "Let It Be Me", "Ball and Chain", "Story of My Life" and a cover of Johnny Cash's "Ring of Fire" all charting on the Modern Rock Tracks top 25. In 1993, following the success of Social Distortion, Bad Religion were signed to Atlantic Records and reissued then-current album Recipe for Hate for the label that same year. Unlike Social Distortion however, Recipe for Hate initially received mixed reviews from music critics but brought the band a little success, peaking at #14 on Billboard's Heatseekers chart.

Also in 1993, Green Day signed a deal with Reprise Records and released their first major label album Dookie in 1994. Dookie became a huge success, peaking at #2 on the Billboard top 200 album chart and selling over 20,000,000 albums worldwide, and over 10,000,000 in the first year alone. Shortly after the success of Dookie, the Offspring's album Smash achieved similar results selling over 16,000,000 albums. However Smash unlike Dookie, was released by independent punk label Epitaph Records, and paved the way for other independent punk bands to achieve success. Formed in 1992, skate punk trio Blink-182 after having spent the next two years recording in DIY fashion two splits and three demos, including the commercially available Buddha signed to independent label Cargo in 1994. They released their debut album Cheshire Cat through Cargo imprint Grilled Cheese in February 1995. The record, and heavy touring in support, helped the band gain a following in and out of the San Diego local punk scene and subsequently Australia. After opening for bigger bands in the scene like Pennywise and NOFX, Fletcher Dragge, who strongly believed in the trio, convinced Warped Tour founder Kevin Lyman to bring them on the next line up. They put out one EP They Came To Conquer... Uranus in 1996. During this time period, the trio had accumulated genuine interest among major labels, which resulted in a bidding war between MCA, Interscope and Epitaph. The band grew tired of Cargo's lack of distribution and faith in the trio, ultimately signing with MCA and entered the studio after completing tour obligations to record their second LP Dude Ranch, released in June 1997 to moderate success. It gave the band their first hit single, "Dammit". Two years later the album was certified platinum with one million copies sold.

Soon thereafter, Green Day and the Offspring were joined by Bad Religion, NOFX, and Rancid, whose respective albums Stranger Than Fiction, Punk in Drublic, and ...And Out Come the Wolves, were all certified Gold or Platinum (with the first being released on Atlantic and last two on Epitaph). Also during this period, ALL, Face to Face and a reunited Circle Jerks were all signed to major labels, Interscope, A&M and Mercury respectively. The success of these bands also led to success for Southern California ska punk bands like No Doubt, Sublime, Reel Big Fish, Goldfinger, as well as Northern California ska punk outfits like Smash Mouth. In June 1999, Blink-182 released their seminal album Enema of the State, now with a new drummer in Travis Barker, catapulting the trio into mainstream success and spearheading a second wave of pop punk, whose influence had an extensive impact in the genre.

==== Current nardcore ====
As of 2019, there are a handful of bands that play punk rock music that hail from Oxnard and surrounding areas: Bare Minimum, Bootleg Brigade, Global Warning, Civil Conflict, Crazy D & the Nutz, Dead Heat, Malice Thoughts, Marron, Mullholand, Omega Point, Sordo, Violation of Probation and 3-Day Holocaust. As do many of the original Nardcore bands, Dr. Know, Ill Repute, False Confession, and Stalag 13. There has also been a revival of Nardcore as of late 2018 thanks to promoters such as Midnight Society Productions, Bangerz Only, Sleep Away, David Stalsworth (drummer of the above band, Civil Conflict), Ventura Pyrate Punx, Skip Nasty, and Casa Anarkia. The musical style has transcended the years, recently becoming a faster brand of punk. In the early years of Nardcore, there was a scene of localism with songs such as "Oxnar'd by Ill Repute and "Locals Only" by Agression. Nardcore music now includes various musical sub-genres that all fall within the umbrella of punk: thrash metal, skate punk, surf punk (due to Ventura being a beach community), powerviolence, youth crew punk, hardcore and others. The music scene involves a large mix of people as Oxnard and surrounding areas are racially diverse. Band members are predominantly Hispanic of Mexican descent.

Marron has released two LP records. Sordo has various split cassette tape, as well as split vinyl releases with bands of the same genre.

== Art ==
The proliferation of punk concerts and albums in California generated a like proliferation of flyer and album cover art. Some of the artists involved in producing art for the early punk scene later went on to greater notability. Mark Vallen, a painter and graphic artist, was associated with the early LA punk scene; his work was featured on a number of fanzine and album covers. Gary Panter was also closely associated with the early LA punk scene and produced the Screamers distinctive logo. Raymond Pettibon (brother of Greg Ginn of Black Flag) was similarly associated with the LA hardcore scene, especially Black Flag and the Minutemen, producing Black Flag's distinctive "four bars" logo. Winston Smith, a San Francisco collage artist, was associated with Dead Kennedys and also did a piece of artwork named "God Told Me to Skin You Alive" for Green Day's fourth album Insomniac.

== Diverse punk rock artist and groups ==
According to historian Gaye Theresa Johnson the emergence of ethnic punk rock bands in Los Angeles was a result of double marginalization of individuals within the African-American and Latino communities during the late 1970s. She says some punk artists suggest that this double marginalization was necessary for these groups to develop the "D.I.Y." attitude associated with Punk Rock groups. These bands drew upon their working class experiences and sexual and racial identities in their music. Los Angeles' punk scene produced notable ethnic artist such as Alice Bag. Born Alicia Armendariz in 1958, Alice Bag, went on to become a member of punk rock groups Masque Era and the leader of the Bags. Bag was one of the few female leaders in the Punk Rock scene in the 1980s. Bag says one of the things that inspired her to join the punk rock scene was being rejected by the leaders of her high school's Brown Berets club. Bags says the organization didn't think she was serious about civil rights issues because of her appearance. Chicano and Chicana artists like Bag and Los Crudos challenged the idea that Punk Rock was an exclusively white genre by incorporating Spanish lyrics into their music. Bag continues to participate in the Punk Rock scene four decades after her debut, making her first solo track in 2016. Bag also continues to support the female punk rock scene in Los Angeles by interviewing and highlighting them on her website.

=== Queercore ===
San Francisco and Los Angeles were major centers for both gay and punk subcultures, and there has long been crossover between them, with bands such as Nervous Gender and MDC featuring openly gay or bisexual frontpersons. When the queercore scene emerged in the early 1990s, California cities were major hubs of this emerging subculture. Pansy Division, a defining band in the queercore scene, hailed from San Francisco. In Los Angeles, Extra Fancy was one of the first post-alternative punk rock bands to be led by an openly gay individual, Brian Grillo. Grillo's intimidating look went against the stereotypical image of a gay male and was supposed to depict a radical homosexual enraged against machismo. Vaginal "Creme" Davis was an African American artist from Watts that emerged from the queercore scene in Los Angeles. Davis became well known for challenging the mainstream view of the gay community. He called it the "ultimate conformist culture" and said, "I never fit into the mainstream gay world and never will." Davis performed in drag and began a band with Alice Bags where its members dressed up as teenage Latinas.

== Notable venues ==
Notable punk rock venues in California
Name	Image	City	Dates	Notes
924 Gilman Street		Berkeley	1986–present	
The Allen Theater		South Gate	2002–2007	
Aquatic Park		Berkeley	1980s	Hardcore/crossover festivals billed as "Eastern Front" and nicknamed "Day on the Dirt" were annually held here in the 1980s.
Berkeley Square		Berkeley	1970s - 1990s	Seminal venue supporting local punk scene and focal point of NorCal thrash scene.
Barrington Hall		Berkeley	until 1984	Former student co-operative residence
The Casbah		San Diego	1989–present	
Cathay de Grande		Hollywood	1980s	
Chain Reaction		Anaheim	1990s-present	
Che Cafe		San Diego	1980–present	
The Coconut Teaszer		Los Angeles	mid/late 1980s–mid 2000s	8117 Sunset Blvd.
Chuck Landis' Country Club		Reseda	1979-1990s	
Cloyne Court		Berkeley	1980s–2000s	Student co-operative residence
Cobalt Cafe		Canoga Park	1990–2014	
Cuckoo's Nest		Costa Mesa	1978–1981	
The Deaf Club		San Francisco	1978–1979	
The Elite Club		San Francisco	early 1980s	Venue is currently, formerly, and better known as The Fillmore
The Farm		San Francisco	late 1970s–1980s	
Fender's Ballroom		Long Beach	1984–1989	
Grand Olympic Auditorium		Los Angeles	1980–2005	
Great American Music Hall		San Francisco	1972–present	
Hong Kong Café		Los Angeles	1979–1981	In Chinatown
Koo's Arts Cafe		Santa Ana	1994 - 200?	First all ages venue in Orange County
Mabuhay Gardens		San Francisco	1976–1986	In North Beach
Madame Wong's		Los Angeles	1978–1985	In Chinatown
The Masque		Los Angeles	1977–1979	
Mission Records		San Francisco	1990s	
The Phoenix Theater		Petaluma	1982–present	
Raji's		Hollywood	1980s–1990s	Hastings Hotel building, 6160 Hollywood Blvd.
Rock on Broadway		San Francisco	1984–1985	In same building as The Mabuhay, lower level of 435 Broadway
Ruthie's Inn		Berkeley	until 2002	
Showcase Theater		Corona	2000s	
The Smell		Los Angeles	1997–present	
SOMA		San Diego	1986–1999; 2002–present	
Starwood		Los Angeles	1973–1981	
The Stone		San Francisco	1980–1990	412 Broadway
The Sound of Music		San Francisco	1980-1987	162 Turk Street in the Tenderloin.
Target Video		San Francisco	1978–1981	
Valencia Tool & Die		San Francisco	late 1970s–early 1980s	
The Warfield		San Francisco	1979–present	
Trocadero Transfer		San Francisco	1990s	
Warm Water Cove		San Francisco		informal, park setting
Whisky a Go Go		Los Angeles	1964–1982; 1986–present	

== Notable labels ==
While a few bands like Green Day, the Offspring, and AFI appear on major labels, many of the bands are signed to local independent punk labels. Many of these labels were started by local musicians as a way to sell their own bands' records, but grew into labels with a large roster of bands. Some of these labels include:

- Adeline Records – started by Pro Skater Jim Thiebaud, Green Day's Billie Joe Armstrong, and his wife Adrienne Armstrong.
- Alternative Tentacles – started by Dead Kennedys member Jello Biafra
- Asian Man Records – started by Skankin' Pickle's Mike Park
- BYO Records – started by Youth Brigade's Shawn and Mark Stern
- CD Presents Records - started by David Ferguson
- Dangerhouse Records – started by former Screamers member David Brown
- Epitaph Records – started by Bad Religion's Brett Gurewitz
- Fat Wreck Chords – started by NOFX's Fat Mike
- Fearless Records
- Frontier Records
- Sleep It Off Records – started by punk band Less Than Jake.
- Geykido Comet Records
- Gravity Records - started by Heroin
- Hellcat Records – started by Bad Religion's Brett Gurewitz and Rancid's Tim Armstrong
- Hopeless Records
- Kung Fu Records – started by the Vandals' Joe Escalante and Warren Fitzgerald
- Lookout! Records – started by the Lookouts frontman Larry Livermore
- Mordam Records
- Mystic Records
- New Alliance Records – started by the Minutemen
- Nitro Records – started by the Offspring's Dexter Holland and Greg K.
- Pure Noise Records
- Posh Boy Records
- Punkcore Records
- Slash Records – associated with the fanzine Slash
- Slap-a-Ham Records
- SST Records – started by Black Flag guitarist Greg Ginn
- Subterranean Records
- Sympathy for the Record Industry

== Fanzines ==
- Cometbus
- Flipside
- Maximum RocknRoll
- Razorcake
- Slash

== See also ==
- Music of California: Punk rock
- StreetArt: The Punk Poster in San Francisco 1977–1981
