= The Masque =

Nightclub in California, United States

Coordinates: 34.100752°N 118.334989°W

- Interactive map of The Masque
- Address: 1655 North Cherokee Avenue; Hollywood, Los Angeles, California; United States
- Type: Punk rock nightclub

Construction
- Opened: 1977
- Closed: 1978

The Masque was a small punk rock club in central Hollywood, California which existed from 1977 to 1978. It is remembered as a key part of the early LA punk scene.

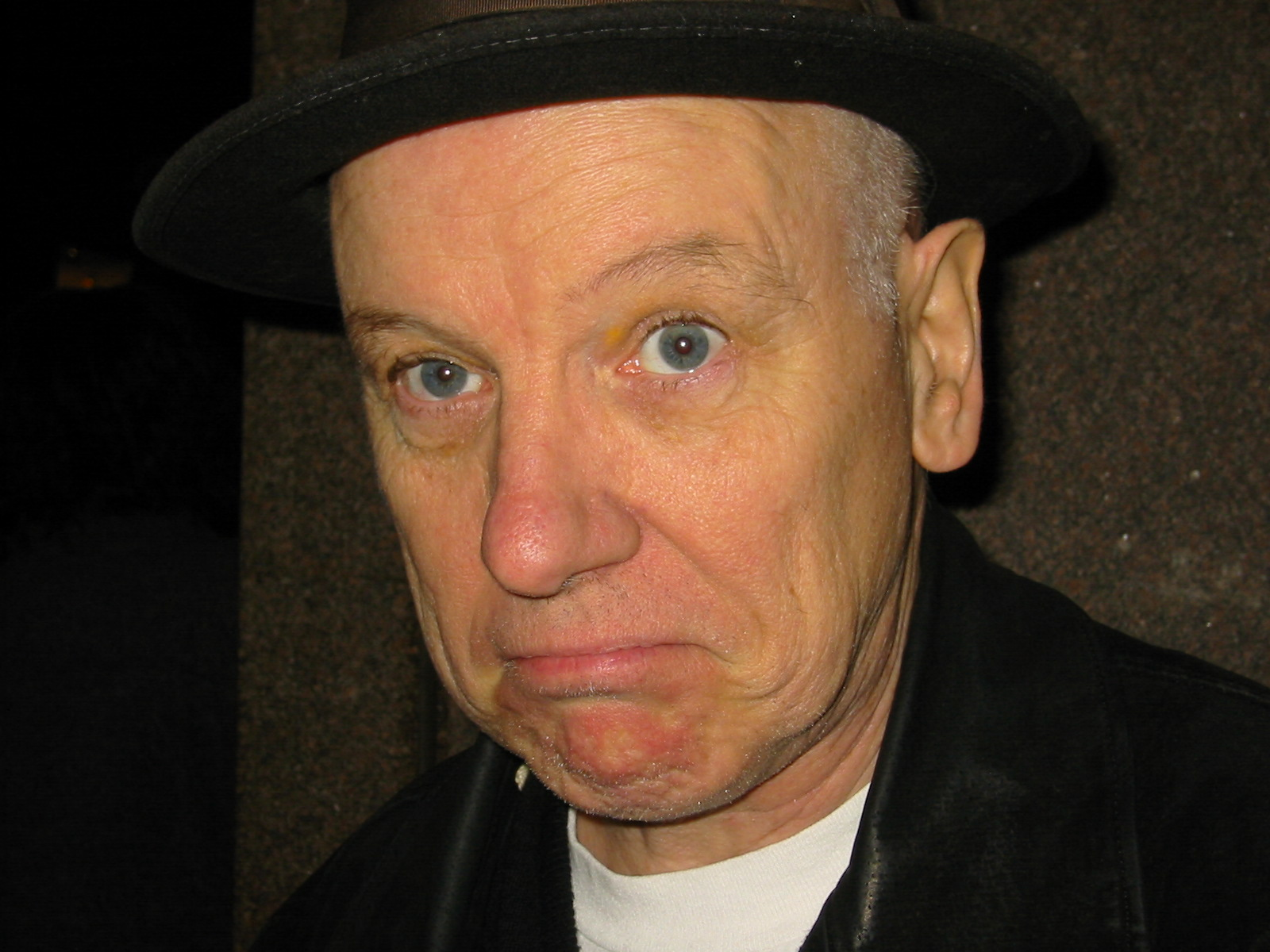
The Masque founder Brendan Mullen in 2003

== History ==
Considered the “CBGB of the West”, The Masque was founded by Scottish-American rock promoter Brendan Mullen, opening on August 18, 1977. It quickly became the nexus of the Los Angeles punk subculture. It was located in the basement of the Shane Building, with a secondary access point in the building's neighboring pornographic movie theater.

Many California punk bands frequently performed there, including the Dickies, X, Germs, Bags, the Screamers, Black Randy and the Metrosquad, the Alley Cats, the Go-Go's, Suburban Lawns, the Mau Maus, the Weirdos, the Zeros, the Avengers, the Dils, the Skulls and the Controllers.

Rhino 39, one of Long Beach, California's earliest punk rock bands, also played there often.

Several bands rented practice space at the Masque, including the Motels, the Controllers, Secrets, the Skulls and the Go-Go's.

At least two compilation records featuring live performances at the Masque were released.

First generation punk fanzines like Flipside and Slash covered the scene at the Masque.

The original Masque was closed by fire marshals on January 14, 1978.

== After closing ==
Mullen went on to open and promote shows at the Other Masque (aka New Masque and Masque 2), also located in Hollywood, from December 1978 through spring 1979. Bands appearing at The Other Masque included the Dead Boys (with local musicians backing Stiv Bators including Nicky Beat of the Weirdos), the Cramps (after moving from New York City), Wall of Voodoo, the Flyboys, the Crowd, the Mutants, Dead Kennedys, The Red Army, X, Germs and others. The loss of the Other Masque resulted in punk bands having to move to the Sunset Strip clubs like the Whisky a Go Go or Gazzarri's. This change in performance venues contributed to the fading of the LA punk scene in the early 1980s.

After the second Masque closed, Mullen opened Club Lingerie, which lasted until 1991.

The music video for "Perfect" by the Smashing Pumpkins, filmed in 1998, featured The Masque and its original graffiti.

The building was renovated in 2001. While most of the walls were removed, the remaining walls in the basement (which now houses the World of Wonder archive) continue to display much of the original graffiti.

Mullen died of a stroke on October 12, 2009. Red Hot Chili Peppers bassist Flea wrote a two-page article on Mullen's passing along with his memories of the Masque in an October 2009 article for the Los Angeles Times. Mullen had been one of the first club promoters to give the Chili Peppers their start in 1983, at Club Lingerie. The band included a tribute to Mullen, "Brendan's Death Song", on their 2011 album I'm with You.

Footage of the remnants of the Masque, as it appeared in 2015, was featured in the documentary Who Is Billy Bones?, which also included archival interview footage of Mullen discussing the formation of The Skulls.
