= Korean United Church of Chile =

Church in Santiago, Chile

The Korean United Church of Chile was founded by missionaries of the Presbyterian Church in Korea (HapDong). It has close fellowship with the Korean-American Presbyterian Church. It has 350 members and adopted the Westminster Confession and the Heidelberg Catechism.
