= Reformed Presbyterian Church in Paraguay =

Church in Asunción, Paraguay

The Reformed Presbyterian Church in Paraguay was established by Korean missionaries. It came into existence in 1975, when Pastor Seung Yong Kim came to Asunción. It was first called the Iglesia Presbiteriana Asunción de los Coreanos. In 1986, other Korean missionaries arrived and the Reformed Presbyterian mission came into existence. A theological seminary came into existence. It is affiliated with the Korean American Presbyterian Church. It has 2,500 members in two parishes and 21 prayer stations. The Westminster Confession of Faith is the official confession. There is no women ordination.
