= False Confession (band) =

American punk band

False Confession is an American hardcore punk band, that formed in the early 1980s in the Oxnard, California, area. They are one of the founding members of the "Nardcore" punk movement.

Their first 7-inch EP Left to Burn was released by Mystic Records in 1984. The tracks included:

1. Left To Burn
2. Feline
3. Scared
4. Our Savior
5. Just As I Am
6. Lies

They were also featured on the Nardcore Compilation LP.

One of the members, Scotty Morris, went on to form the swing band Big Bad Voodoo Daddy in 1989. Another member, Harry, joined The Cramps as Harry Drumdini from January 1994 to August 2003.

In June 2012, the band performed a reunion show and announced their return with almost the entire original lineup of Israel, Harry, Fred, and new bass player Ismael. Scotty Morris has too much of a full schedule with Big Bad Voodoo Daddy to return to the band at this time.

== Members ==
Original lineup:

- Israel Madlangbayan(sic) - Vocals
- Harry Misenheimer - Drums
- Fred Matatquin - Guitar
- Scott Morris - Bass

Current lineup:

- Israel M. - Lead Vocals
- Harry M. - Lead Drums
- Ismael H. - Lead Bass
- Fred M. - Lead Guitar

== Discography ==
- Nardcore Compilation LP, Mystic Records 1984
- Left to Burn 7-inch, Mystic 1984
- Covers, Compilation LP, Mystic 1985
- Mystic Super Seven Sampler No. 1, Compilation 7-inch, Mystic 1985
- Let's Die, Compilation, Mystic 1985
- Out of the Basement Demo 1983 LP, Queer Pills 2013
- Resurrectionists LP, Puke N' Vomit Records, 2021
