= Sound of Music (punk club) =

Punk venue and bar in San Francisco (1980–1987)

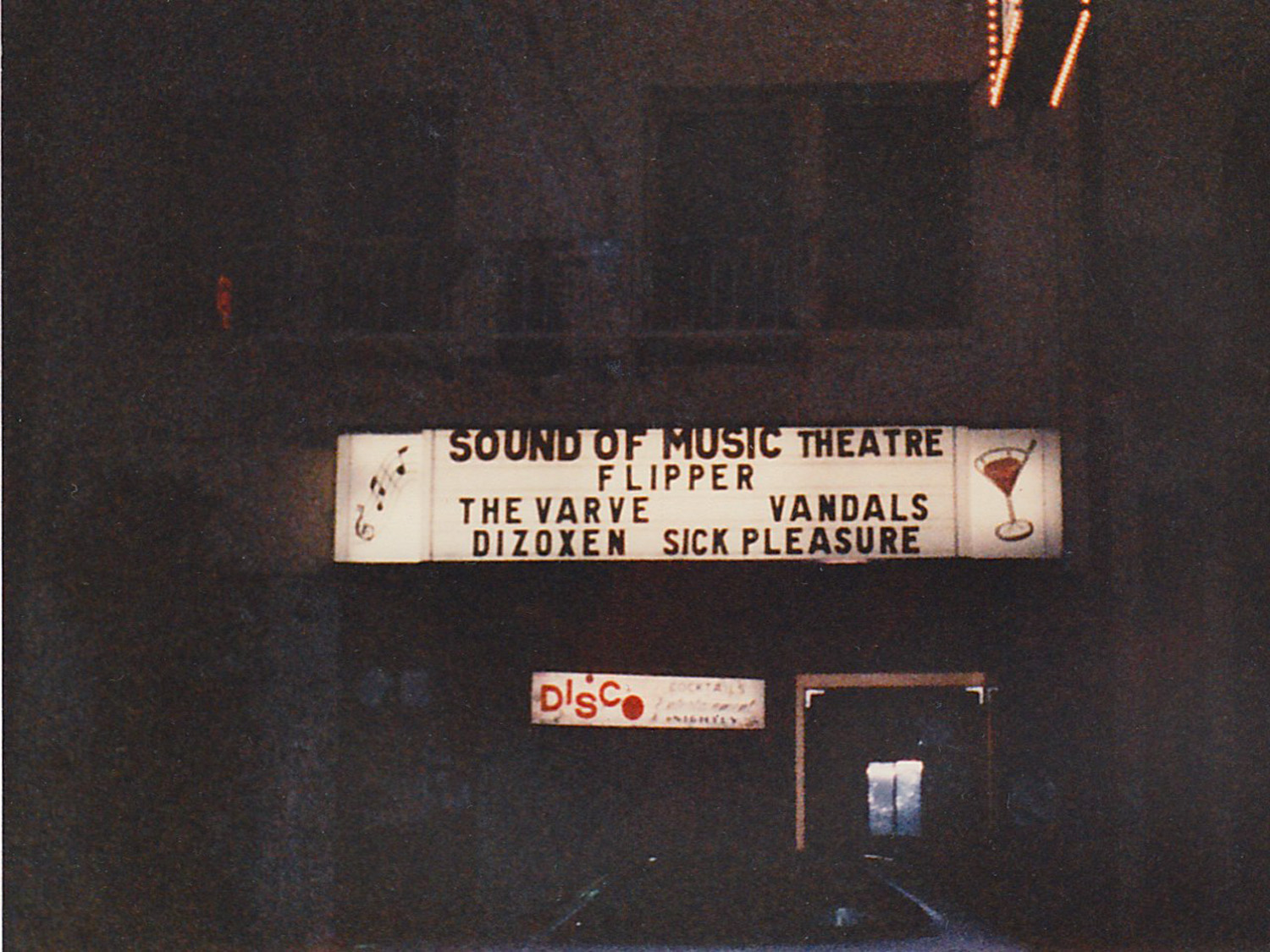
- The Sound of Music, circa 1981
- Interactive map of Sound of Music
- Address: 162 Turk Street, San Francisco, California, U.S.
- Type: Nightclub, bar
- Events: punk rock, new wave

Construction
- Opened: 1980
- Closed: 1987

The Sound of Music club was a punk music concert venue and bar located at 162 Turk Street in the Tenderloin District of San Francisco, California, active from 1980 to 1987.

== History ==
The Sound of Music was a bar in the Tenderloin, which featured drag shows. By 1980, the proprietor, Celso Roberto, became amenable to trying other genres. Linda Barnhizer and Alan Naldrett, two local promoters who occasionally ran shows at a venue at Fort Mason, convinced Celso that punk music would be a good match for the club. The new genre of punk music was already thriving at a few venues in the city, including North Beach's Mabuhay Gardens, a Filipino restaurant during the day and punk nightclub in the evening. The Police, Devo, and Blondie were some of the notable bands that made their first Bay Area appearances at the Mabuhay Gardens.

The first punk performance at Sound of Music was in February 1980, with the bands The Employees and Freon. The venue became a full-time punk club, with many new up-and-coming bands playing most days of the week. Refreshments consisted of cans of beer sold out of coolers for a dollar. A few notable bands, such as Flipper, Juvenile Justice and Vicious Circle, played their first gigs at the Sound of Music. Faith No More and Frightwig performed frequently at the Sound of Music in their early days. Game Theory broke in its San Francisco-based lineup with a pseudonymous debut appearance in May 1985.

The punk scene would morph into an indie rock and pop scene, which was reflected in the bar's ongoing eclectic lineups. The last show booked was in 1987.

== See also ==
- Punk rock in California
