= Esther Wong =

American music promoter (1917–2005)

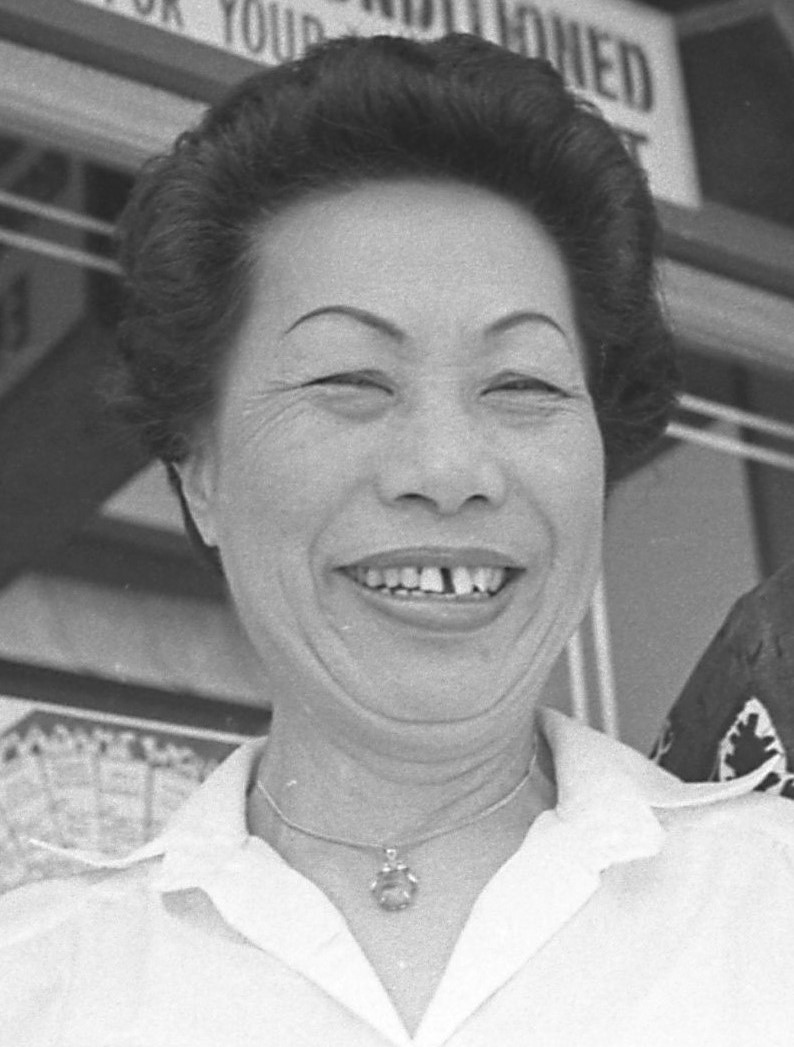
- Wong in 1979
- Born: August 13, 1917; Shanghai, China
- Died: August 14, 2005 (aged 88); Los Angeles, California, U.S.
- Occupations: Music promoter, businesswoman, restaurant owner
- Spouses: George Wong; Harry Wong
- Children: 2

Esther Wong (August 13, 1917 – August 14, 2005) was a Chinese-American music promoter, called the "Godmother of Punk" in Los Angeles, California.

== Life ==
Esther Wong was born in Shanghai in 1917. Her father had been an automobile importer, and she had been well-educated and well-traveled before emigrating to the United States in 1949 to escape the Communist takeover of China. She worked as a clerk for a shipping company for 20 years before opening Madame Wong's (黃家園), a Los Angeles Chinatown restaurant with a floorshow—originally at 949 Sun Mun Way, located in the original 1938 Rice Bowl restaurant.

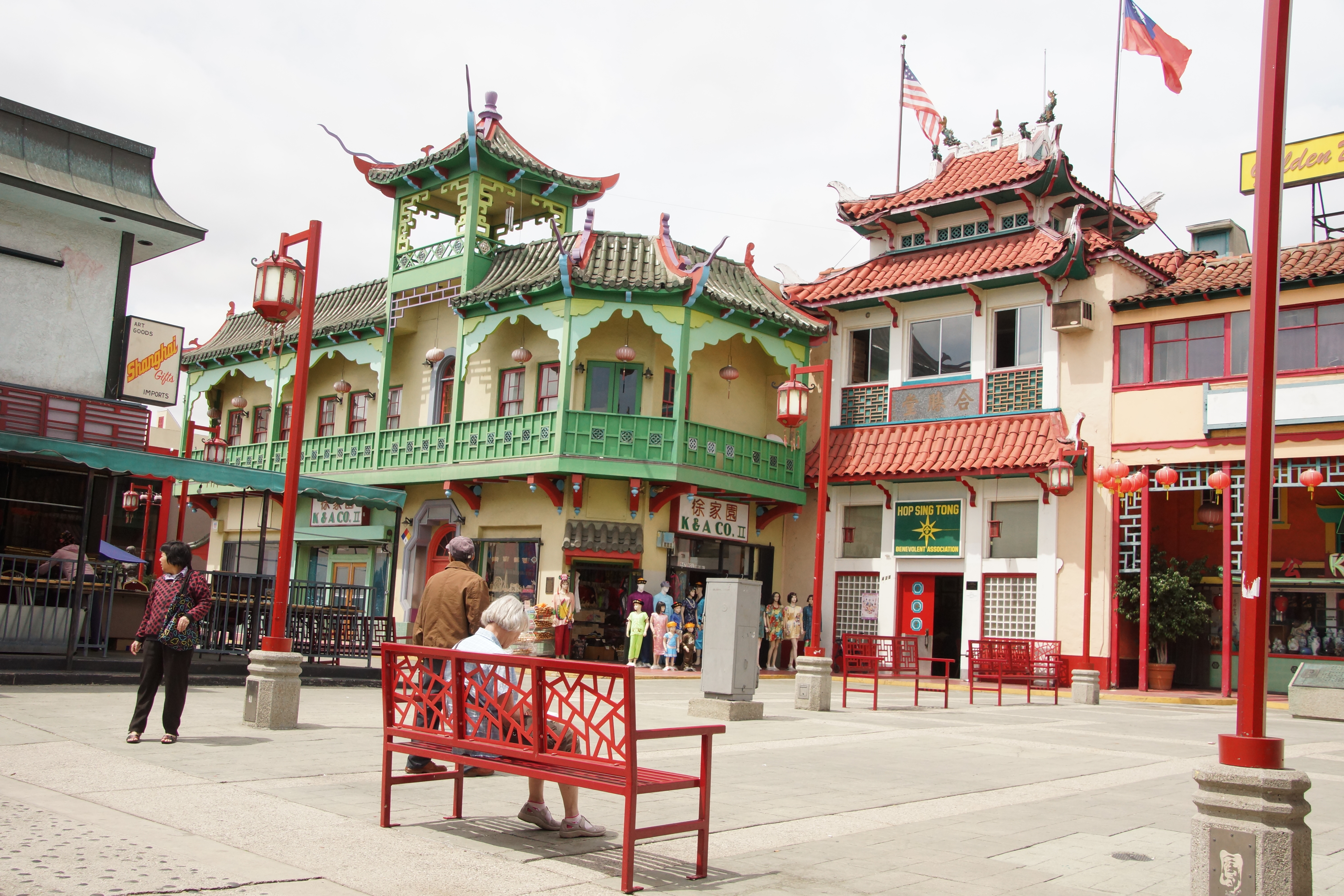
Madame Wong's occupied the upper floor of 949 Sun Mun Way (green-trimmed balcony) in Chinatown Central Plaza, next to the Hop Sing Tong building

After fierce initial resistance, she became a punk rock and new wave music promoter. Polynesian dance acts weren't attracting customers, yet when Paul Greenstein, a Los Angeles "bum vivant," first approached her husband George about booking bands, she declined. Greenstein's persistence, and the fact that he had already given the nearby "Atomic Cafe" a new lease on life (cross-pollination between owners' children worked the magic), caused her to agree to a trial run in October 1978. The first rock show featured The Furys and Gary Valentine's The Know, with many more shows soon following including The Alley Cats, The Zippers and others. Initially, under Greenstein, a showcase for unsigned, unbookable punk-bands, Madame Wong's was one of the few places such bands could perform. With the exit of Greenstein, Madame Wong's morphed into a power-pop palace with bookings more influenced by a now-interested Wong. Notable bands that she showcased included Los Lobos, The Knack, The Police, The Motels, The Members, Fishbone, The Go-Go's, X, The Alley Cats, The Bangs, Oingo Boingo, Los Illegals, Candy, Guns N' Roses, Black Flag, Daniel Amos, Fear, Red Hot Chili Peppers, and the Ramones. Eventually, this led to her nickname, the "Godmother of Punk."

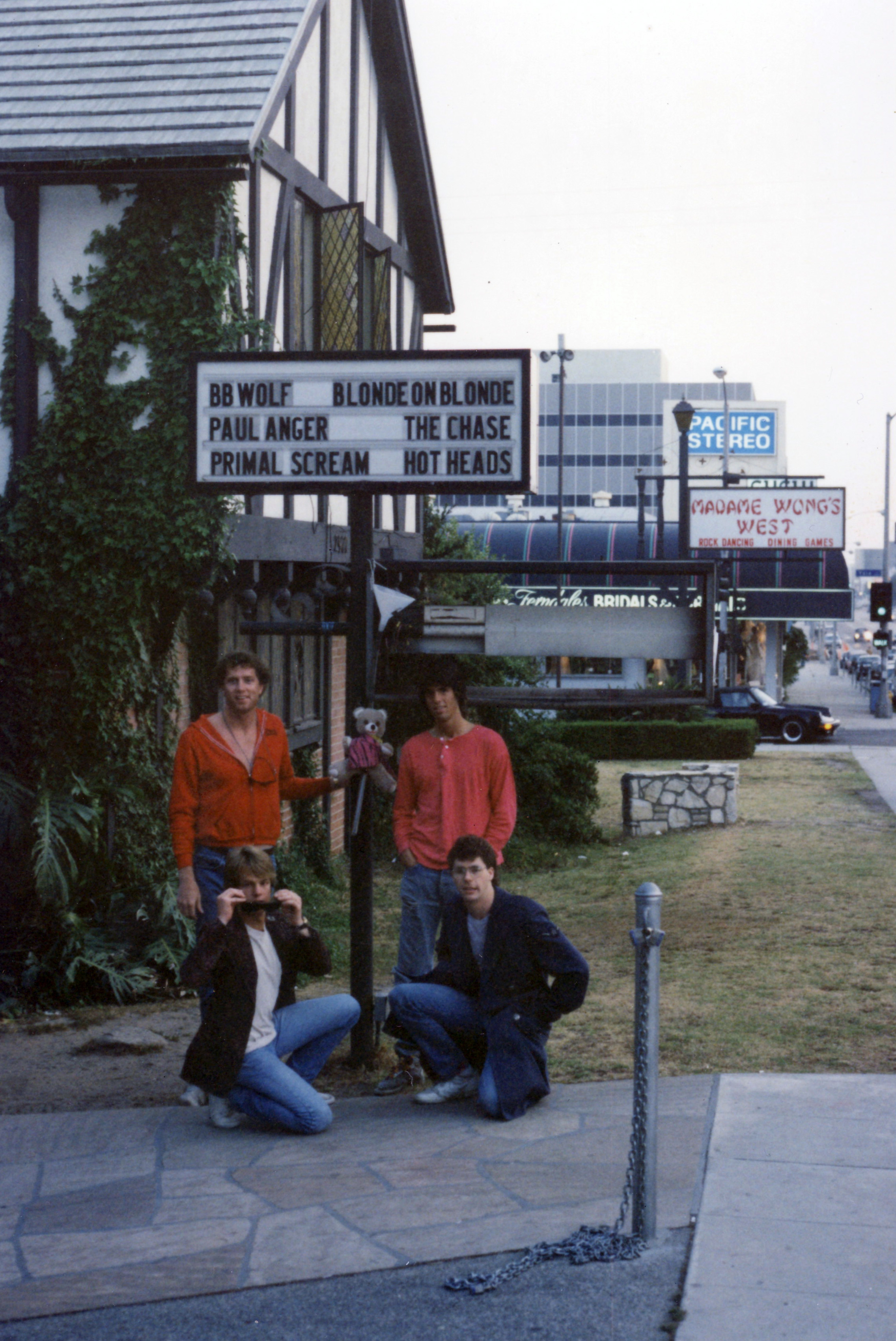
Madam Wong's West

She closed the original "Madame Wong's" after a fire in 1985. She opened another venture, "Madame Wong's West" at 2900 Wilshire in Santa Monica, California in 1978 and it had a successful run before it closed in 1991.

The original "Madame Wong's" unofficially reopened for a brief period in 2009/2010, when Ben Kramer, Stuart Friedel, and Rob Cudd, who were living in an apartment that now occupies the premises, hosted concerts in their living room, using the name Madame Wong's in homage to the original venue. Acts that year included Devendra Banhart, Vampire Weekend's secret 2009 Halloween show, The Answering Machine, Wavves, Smith Westerns, Jounce, Pearl Harbor and the Explosions, Backbiter, Salvador Santana, The Growlers, Harlem, and others.

Esther Wong died from emphysema and lung cancer on August 14, 2005, in Los Angeles, aged 88. She was survived by her second husband, Harry Wong, two children, six grandchildren, and four great-grandchildren.

== See also ==
- Hong Kong Café
- Atomic Cafe
