= Norton & Wallis =

Architectural Firm

- Type: Architectural firm
- Founders: Samuel Tilden Norton; Frederick H. Wallis
- Defunct: 1959
- Headquarters: Los Angeles, California, United States

Norton & Wallis was an architectural firm in Los Angeles that designed several historic buildings. The firm included partners, Samuel Tilden Norton (1877–1959) and Frederick H. Wallis.

== Projects ==
=== Norton & Wallis ===
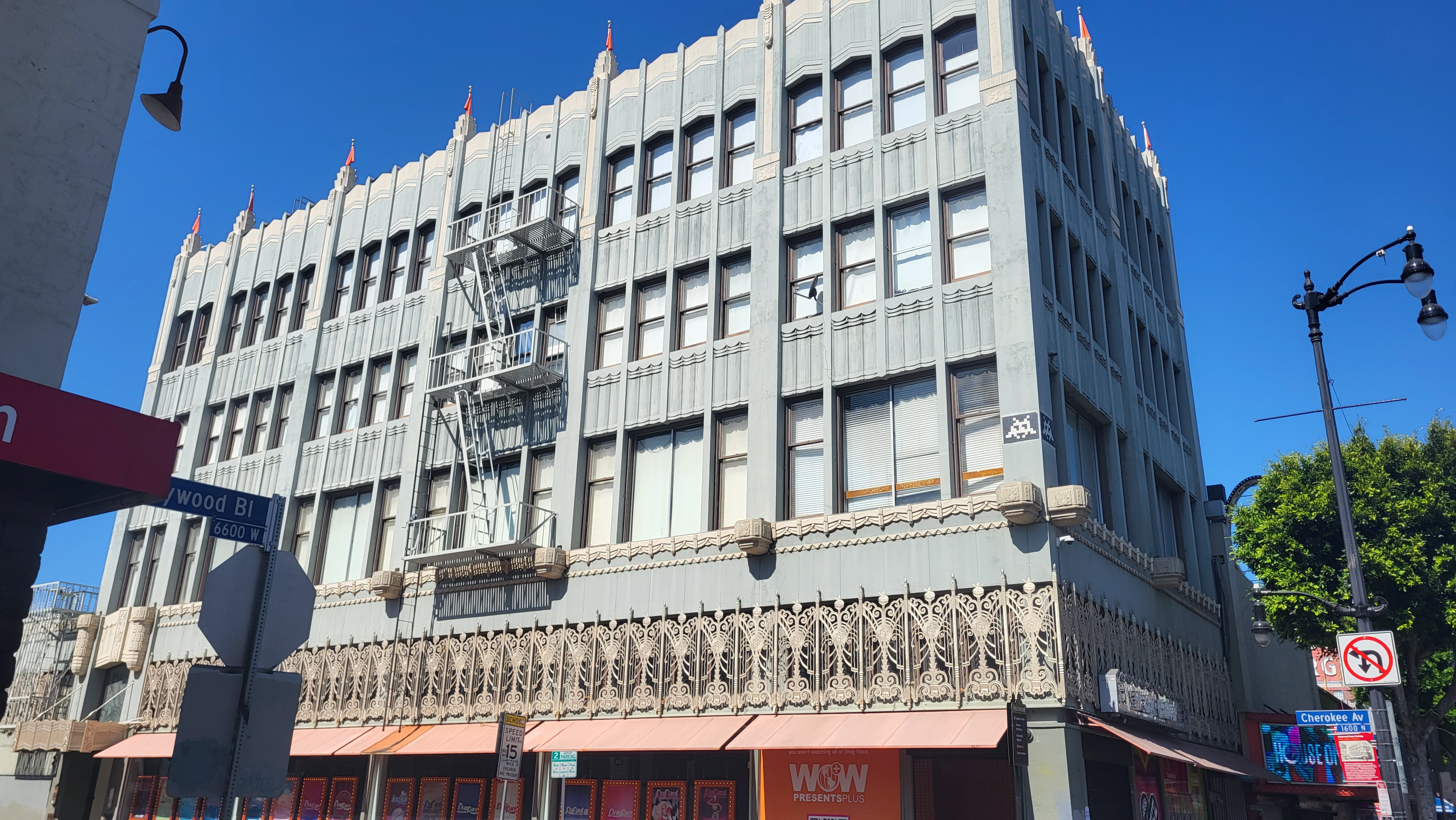
Shane Building

- Financial Center Building (1923), contributing property in the Spring Street Financial District
- Temple Sinai No. 2 (1925), LAHCM No. 91
- Young Men's Hebrew Association (1925)
- Greek Theatre (1930)
- Shane Building (1930), contributing property in the Hollywood Boulevard Commercial and Entertainment District
- Ritz Theatre (1930)

=== Frederick H. Wallis ===
- Upton Sinclair House (1923), NRHP No. 71000153
