= Pass the Dust, I Think I'm Bowie =

Studio album by Black Randy and the Metrosquad
- Released: 1979
- Studios: Kitchen Sync (except tracks 4 and 12)
- Label: Dangerhouse Records
- Producer: Dangerhouse (as listed in liner notes)

Pass the Dust, I Think I'm Bowie is the sole studio album by Black Randy and the Metrosquad, released in 1979 by record label Dangerhouse.

== Reception ==
Professional ratings
Review scores
Source	Rating
AllMusic	3/5 stars
Tiny Mix Tapes	favorable

Online magazine Tiny Mix Tapes called it "heavily intoxicating, and despite all the nastiness abound, a pretty damn good time."

== Track listing ==
All songs written by Black Randy (lyrics) and David Brown (music), except where noted.

1. "I Slept in an Arcade" – 2:28 (Music: Pat Garrett)
2. "Marlon Brando" – 1:54
3. "I Tell Lies Every Day" – 1:54 (Lyrics: Metrosquad; Music: Brown, Bob Deadwyler)
4. "Down at the Laundrymat" – 3:27 (Music: Deadwyler)
5. "I Wanna Be a Nark" – 1:45 (Music: Garrett)
6. "Give It Up or Turn It A-Loose" – 2:15 (Music: Charles Bobbitt)
7. "Idi Amin" – 1:30 (Music: Metrosquad)
8. "Sperm Bank Baby" – 1:20
9. "Barefootin' on the Wicket Picket" – 4:02 (Lyrics: Brown; Music: Brown, Tom Hughes)
10. "San Francisco" – 1:54
11. "Tellin' Lies" – 1:54 (Music: Brown, Deadwyler)
12. "(Say It Loud) I'm Black and Proud (Part 1)" – 2:54 (Lyrics and Music: James Brown; arr. Black Randy and Metrosquad)
13. "(Theme From) Shaft" – 2:41 (Lyrics and Music: Isaac Hayes; arr. Black Randy and Metrosquad)
