= Shane Building =

Building in Los Angeles, California, U.S.

- U.S. Historic district – Contributing property
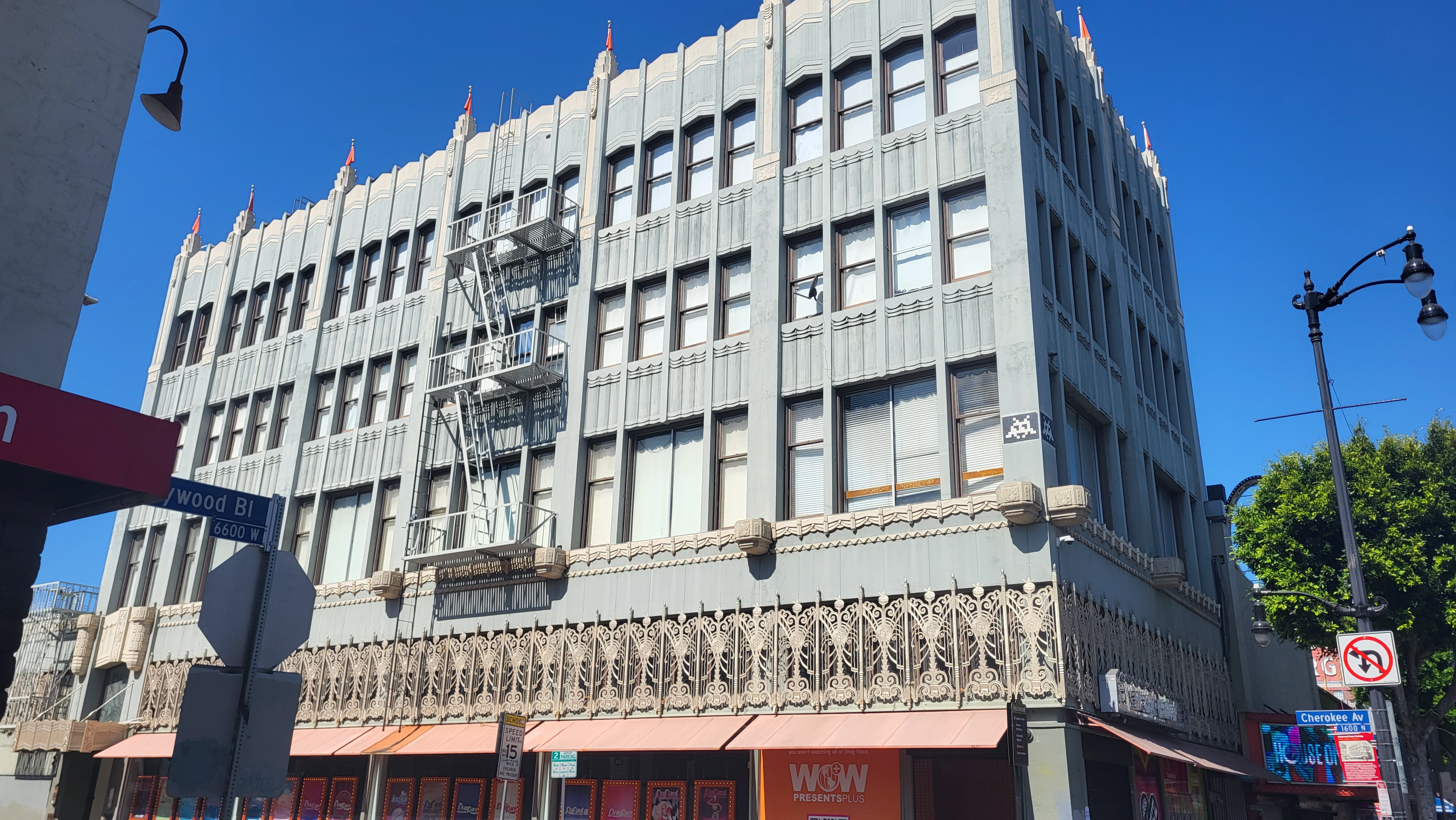
- The building in 2024

- Location within the Los Angeles metropolitan area
- Location: 6650-6654 W. Hollywood Blvd. and 1655 N Cherokee Ave Hollywood, California
- Coordinates: 34.101°N 118.335°W
- Built: 1930
- Architect: Norton & Wallis
- Architectural style: Zigzag Moderne
- Part of: Hollywood Boulevard Commercial and Entertainment District (ID85000704)
- Designated CP: April 4, 1985

Shane Building, also known as Hollywood Center, is a historic four-story building at 6650-6654 W. Hollywood Blvd. and 1655 N Cherokee Ave in Hollywood, California.

== History ==
Built in 1930, Shane Building was designed by Norton & Wallis. The building was the original home of the Writers Guild of America and the Screen Actors Guild, and was once home to the Directors Guild of America as well.

During the 1970s and 1980s, the building was owned by Walnut Properties/Pussycat Theatres (Vincent Miranda, George Tate). From August 1977 to January 1978, the building's basement was home to Los Angeles's first punk rock club, The Masque. The club also had a secondary access point from the building's neighboring pornographic theater. The Ramones opened in the basement club before becoming famous.

In 1985, the Hollywood Boulevard Commercial and Entertainment District was added to the National Register of Historic Places, with Shane Building listed as a contributing property in the district.

In 2000, the building was bought by Randy Barbato and Fenton Bailey to serve as headquarters for their production company World of Wonder. The building was purchased from SDH Properties LLC for $3 million ($5.61 million in 2025).

== Architecture ==
Shane Building was built with reinforced concrete and features an art deco style known as Zigzag Moderne. Elements of the style prominent in the building include highly stylized gates, elaborate etched glass, verticality through pilasters that extend from the second story to above the parapet, and chevron shaped panels that articulate the top story windows.

The building is known for having one of the finest Art Deco lobbies in Hollywood.

== See also ==
- List of contributing properties in the Hollywood Boulevard Commercial and Entertainment District
