= Ritz Theatre (Hollywood, California) =

Former movie theater in Hollywood, Los Angeles

Ritz Theater
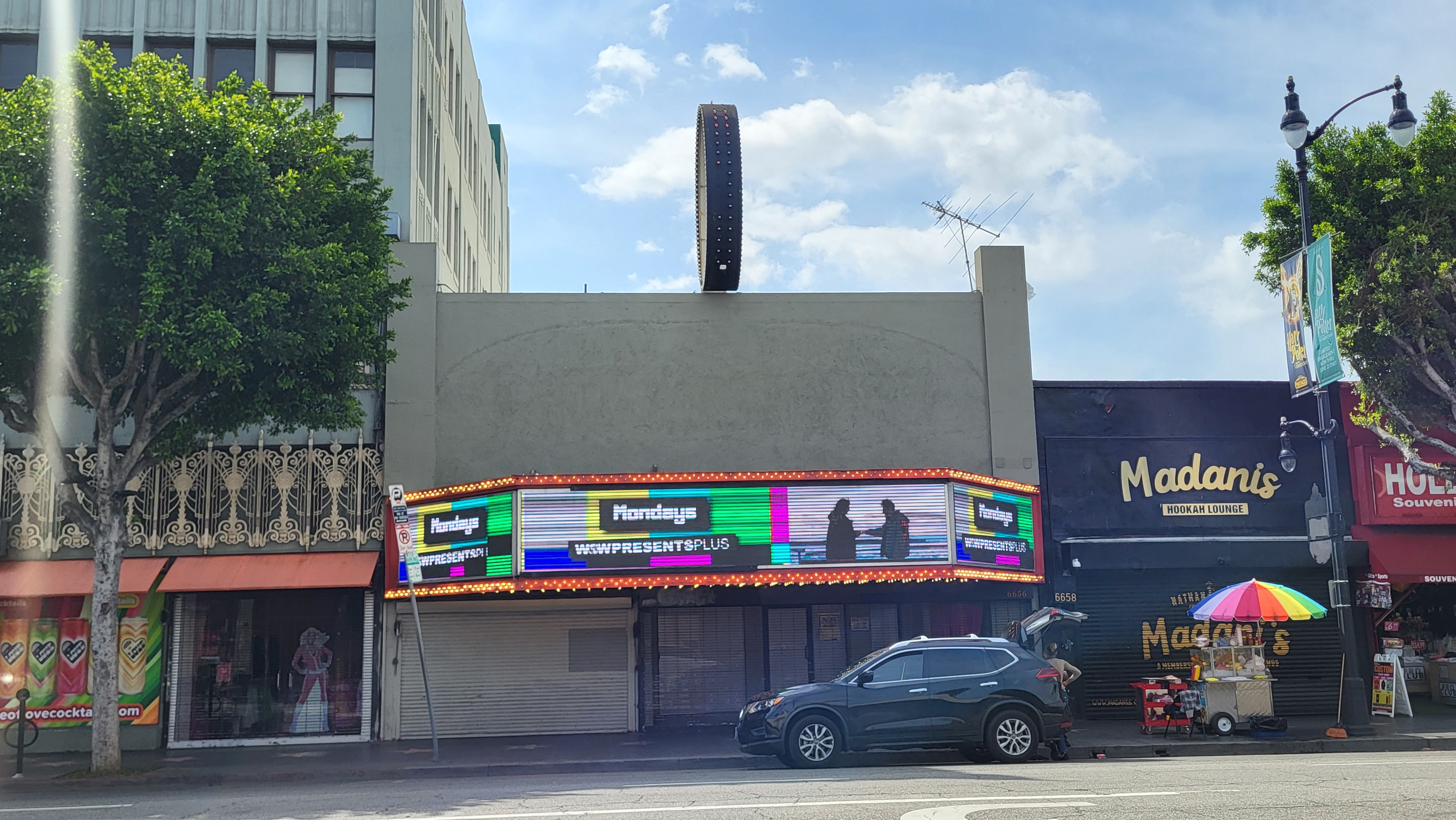
- The building in 2025
- Interactive map of Ritz Theater
- Address: 6656 Hollywood Boulevard, Hollywood, California
- Coordinates: 34.101°N 118.335°W
- Capacity: 386 originally
- Type: Indoor Newsreel and movie theater

Construction
- Built: 1930
- Opened: May 2, 1940
- Renovated: 1939, 1969, 2016
- Closed: 1991
- Years active: 1940-1991, 2017-2018
- Architect: Norton & Wallis

Hollywood's Ritz Theatre, formerly News View Theatre, Newsreel Theatre, Hollywood Newsreel, New View Theatre, Pacific New View, Pussycat Theatre, and briefly Hologram USA Theater, is a historic former newsreel and movie theater located at 6656 W. Hollywood Boulevard in Hollywood, California.

== History ==
The building that would become the Ritz Theatre was originally built for retail in 1930. In 1939–1940, it was repurposed into the 386-seat News View Theatre (also known as Newsreel Theater), designed by Norton & Wallis and featuring a streamline moderne interior and Art Deco lettering on its exterior.

The theater opened on May 2, 1940, boasting a policy of screening newsreels air-expressed from New York in 15 hours and London in 40. The theater's first screening included views of the siege of Warsaw, a special reel that applied words of Washington to European events of the day, and lighter fare such as sports, woman's issues, Lew Lehr commenting on bathing beauties, and various other items. The Bear's Tale, a Merrie Melodies cartoon, was also screened, as was Carey Wilson's commentary on A Door Will Open and Pete Smbth's Spots Before Your Eyes.

By 1944, the theater was owned by ABC Theatres. In 1949, the theater starting going by Hollywood Newsreel, and in 1954, it changed its name to New View Theatre as it transitioned from newsreels to features. In 1968, Pacific Theatres acquired the theater and renamed it Pacific New View, and the theatre was renovated, including the addition of a snack bar, in 1969.

In 1974, the theater was taken over by the porno theater chain Pussycat Theaters, where Deep Throat would play for more than ten years, ending in 1989. Additionally, from August 1977 to January 1978, the theater's neighbor housed Los Angeles's first punk rock club in its basement, with a secondary access point through a staircase from this theatre.

In 1984, the Hollywood Boulevard Commercial and Entertainment District was added to the National Register of Historic Places, and while this theater is in the district, it was not listed as a contributing or non-contributing property.

In 1989, the theater became the Ritz Theatre, which closed in 1991. It was managed by Johnny Legend and Eric Caidin.

In 1994, the theater became a church, which closed in 2015. In November 2017, the building was reopened by Alki David as Hologram USA Theater, which closed one year later.

In 2020, the building was used as a marijuana lounge.

== In popular culture ==
This theater has been featured in numerous films, including Lethal Weapon, Alex in Wonderland, Death Wish II, Exit Through the Gift Shop, and Once Upon a Time in Hollywood.
