= Financial Center Building =

Building in Los Angeles, California

- U.S. Historic district – Contributing property
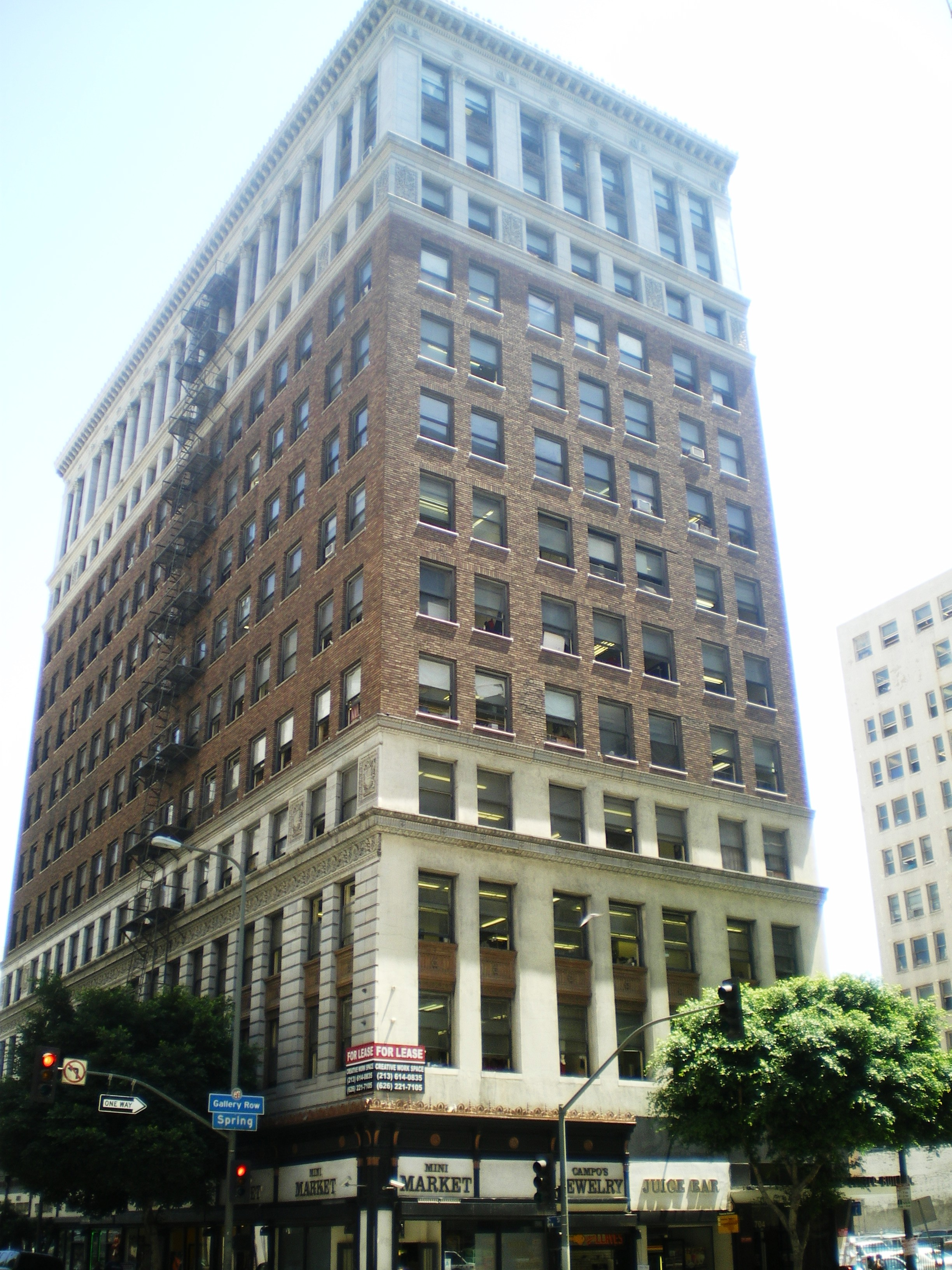
- The building in 2008

- Location within the Los Angeles metropolitan area
- Location: 700-704 S. Spring Street and 126-140 W. 7th Street, Los Angeles, California
- Coordinates: 34.0444°N 118.2521°W
- Built: 1923
- Architect: Norton and Wallis
- Architectural style: Commercial Style/Beaux Arts
- Part of: Spring Street Financial District (ID79000489)
- Designated CP: August 10, 1979

Financial Center Building is a historic building located at 700-704 S. Spring Street and 126-140 W. 7th Street in downtown Los Angeles, California. It is a contributing property in the National Register of Historic Places-listed Spring Street Financial District and the City of Los Angeles-listed Seventh Street Commercial Historic District.

== History ==
Financial Center Building was designed by Norton and Wallis and built in 1923–1924. It was originally designed to house financial offices.

A 1923 newspaper article about its planned construction said that it would be of "class A, steel and fireproof construction featuring semiglazed mottled sienna terra cotta for the exterior walls on the four lower floors and three upper stories. Other floors on the exterior will be finished in light sienna tapestry brick." The construction team had a friendly race with the builders of an adjacent new building. The lobby was built with decorative travertine stone, bronze doors, and a polychrome painted ceiling.

Shortly after construction, S.W. Straus & Co. offered real estate bonds backed by the building's mortgage. By 1933, the bonds were in default.

Tenants in 1940 included an audit office of the Federal Surplus Commodities Corporation and a Food Stamp Division Administrative Office.

In 1979, the Spring Street Financial District was added to the National Register of Historic Places, with Financial Center Building listed as a contributing property in the district. The building is also included in the City of Los Angeles-listed Seventh Street Commercial Historic District.

== Architecture and design ==
Financial Center Building is thirteen stories and built of brick, tile, and concrete with a steel frame. The United States Department of the Interior describes the building as "basically Commercial Style," while other sources including the City of Los Angeles and Los Angeles Conservancy describe the building as having a Beaux Arts design. The building facade features pressed brick, terra cotta, metal, and many ornamental details.

== See also ==
- List of contributing properties in the Spring Street Financial District
