= Atomic Cafe (diner) =

Defunct diner in Los Angeles, California, U.S.

Coordinates: 34.0489°N 118.2384°W

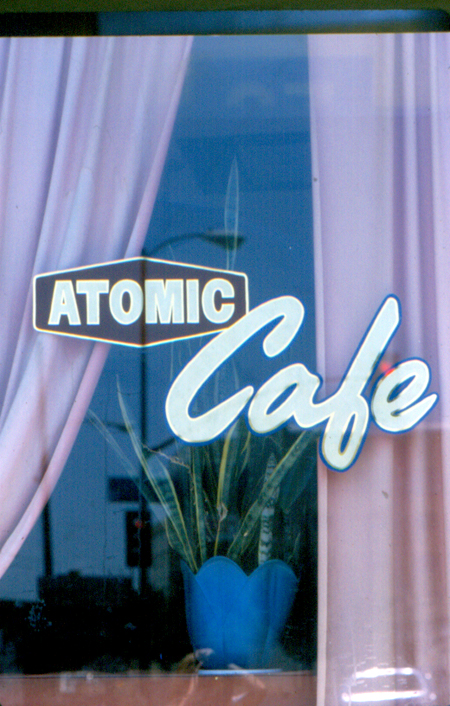
Atomic Cafe window circa 1980

The Atomic Cafe was a diner located at 422 East First Street in the Little Tokyo district of Los Angeles, California.

== History ==
The cafe opened in 1946, during the post-war Atomic Age marked with a pop culture obsession with all things atomic. It was owned and operated by the Matoba family and founded by Ito and Minoru Matoba. The cafe was notable as a popular gathering place for adherents of punk rock in Los Angeles from 1977 forward. This was mainly because the proprietor's daughter, "Atomic Nancy" Matoba, covered most of the interior walls and ceiling with posters and fliers for punk rock bands. Music promoter Paul Greenstein frequented the cafe and promoted it among the punk counterculture scene. In addition the jukebox was a combination of punk singles, new wave music, classic rock and roll, standards, and songs in Japanese.

The cafe closed its doors on Thanksgiving Day, November 23, 1989.

The building that housed the Atomic Cafe was demolished in January 2015 to create a new subway station as part of the Regional Connector.

== Popular culture ==
The diner lends its name to, and footage of it appears in, the 1982 documentary The Atomic Cafe.

Mentioned in the lyrics to "Adolescent" from the 1978 album Electrify Me by The Plugz.

Mentioned in the lyrics to "Kabuki Girl" from the 1982 album Milo Goes to College by the Descendents.

The Atomic Cafe appears briefly in the 1983 film, Blue Thunder and in the Lionel Richie video "Running with the Night" of the same year.

A cafe appearing in the 1985 film Mad Max Beyond Thunderdome was named "The Atomic Cafe."

The cafe was featured in the 2021 Netflix animated series City of Ghosts.
