= Dangerhouse Records =

Record label

- Founded: 1977
- Founder: David Brown, Pat Garrett, Black Randy
- Defunct: 1980
- Genre: Punk rock, art punk, garage punk
- Country of origin: United States
- Location: Los Angeles, California

Dangerhouse Records was a punk music record label based in Los Angeles, California.

== Overview ==
Dangerhouse was one of the first independent labels to document the burgeoning West Coast punk rock scene. Started in 1977 and collapsing by the end of 1980, it was a short-lived enterprise, which nonetheless left an indelible mark on the punk rock history.

Established by David Brown and Pat "Rand" Garrett, both members of the punk rock band Black Randy and the Metrosquad, the company operated on a limited budget, supported by the more conventional typesetting and aerospace jobs of the founders. Black Randy himself got a day job in telemarketing and joined the effort as a business partner.

Despite its scarce resources, Dangerhouse was notable for its production quality. They released records on many of California's finest first-wave punk bands, including X, The Eyes, The Bags, The Alley Cats, Avengers, the Weirdos, and the Dils.

Discord, a lack of financial reward, big label competition, and the rise of hardcore punk in the South Bay/OC are cited as the reasons for the demise of the company.

== Discography ==
In its brief existence, Dangerhouse Records put out only 14 7-inch vinyl records, one LP, and one compilation 12-inch EP.

Dangerhouse Records discography
| Year | Artist | Title | Format | Type | Catalog # |
|---|---|---|---|---|---|
| 1977 | Randoms | "ABCD" | 7" | single | PT-1 |
| 1977 | Black Randy and the Metrosquad | Trouble at the Cup | 7" | EP | MO-721 |
| 1977 | Avengers | We Are the One | 7" | EP | SFD 400 |
| 1977 | The Dils | 198 Seconds of The Dils | 7" | single | SLA-268 |
| 1978 | The Weirdos | "We Got the Neutron Bomb" | 7" | single | SP-1063 |
| 1978 | The Alley Cats | "Nothing Means Nothing Anymore" | 7" | single | LOM-22 |
| 1978 | X | "Adult Books" | 7" | single | D88 |
| 1978 | Black Randy and His Elite Metrosquad | Idi Amin | 7" | EP | IDI-722 |
| 1978 | Howard Werth | "Obsolete" | 7" | single | DH-101 |
| 1978 | The Deadbeats | Kill the Hippies | 7" | EP | IQ-29 |
| 1978 | Bags | "Survive" | 7" | single | BAG 199 |
| 1979 | The Eyes | "TAQN" | 7" | single | IZE-45 |
| 1979 | Rhino 39 | "Xerox" | 7" | single | RH-39 |
| 1979 | Black Randy and Metrosquad | "I Slept in an Arcade" | 7" | single | KY-724 |
| 1979 | Black Randy and the Metrosquad | Pass the Dust, I Think I'm Bowie | LP | studio album | PCP-725 |
| 1979 | various artists | Yes L.A. | 12" | compilation EP | EW-79 |
| 2013 | Sienna Nanini | Pants Down Time | LP | studio album | LAMB-01 |

== See also ==
- List of record labels
