= The Know (band) =

American musical band

- Origin: Los Angeles, California, U.S.
- Genres: Dream pop; shoegaze
- Years active: 2019–present
- Members: Daniel Knowles; Jennifer Farmer
- Website: www.wearetheknow.com

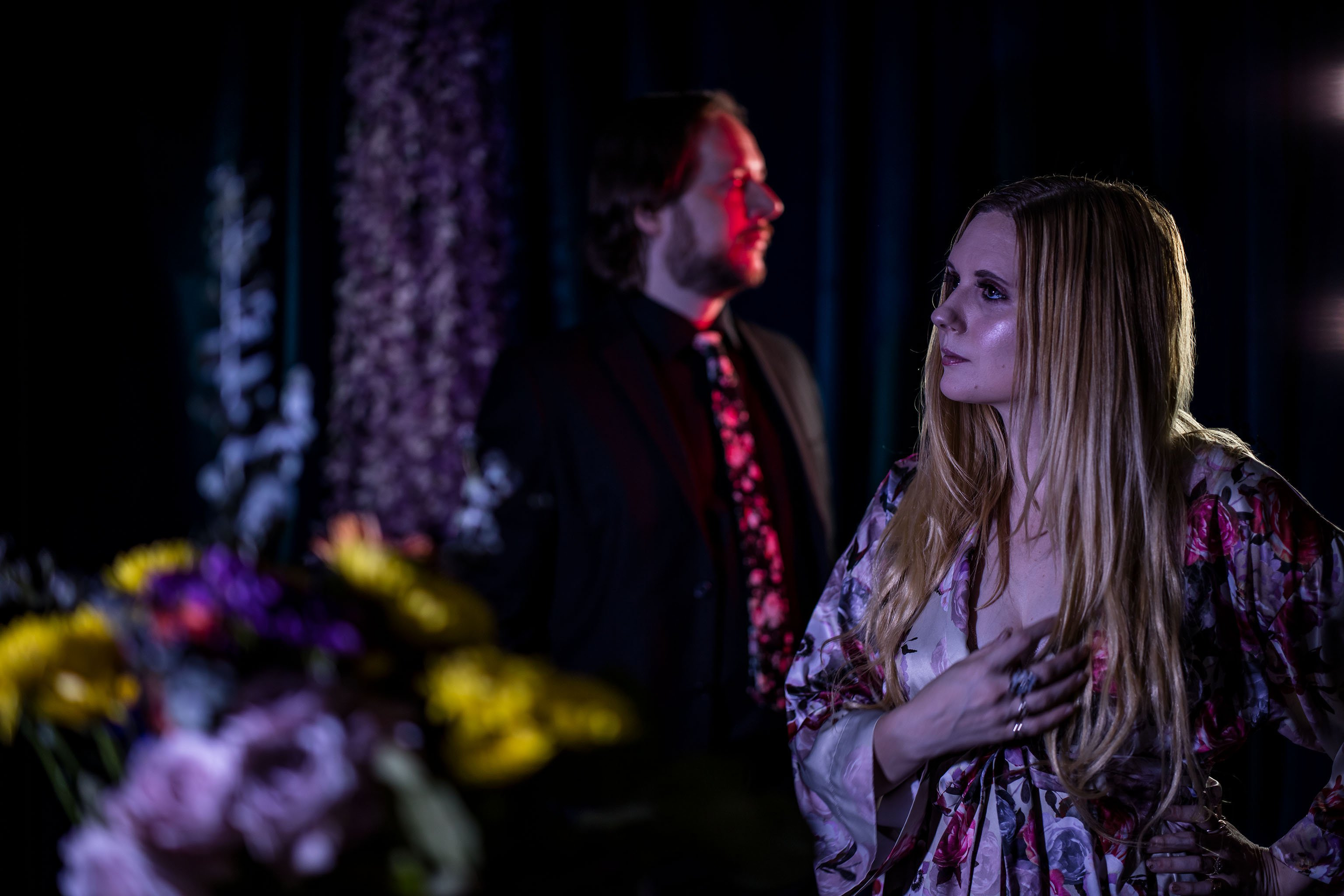
The Know (band)

The Know is a Los Angeles-based dream pop and shoegaze band composed of husband and wife duo, Daniel Knowles and Jennifer Farmer.

== History ==
The Know began in late 2018 when Daniel Knowles suggested to his wife, Jennifer Farmer, that instead of traveling home for the holidays that they stay put and try to create music together, just the two of them. For the next few weeks, they isolated themselves in their home studio and started the band which was officially launched in 2019 in Los Angeles, CA.

Daniel Knowles records, produces, mixes, masters, and plays all of the instruments on the recordings. He was previously a producer and guitarist for UK shoegaze band Amusement Parks on Fire. Jennifer is the lead vocalist and serves as co-writer for the band. She also directs all of the band's visuals and music videos.

== Discography ==
The Know's first release was their lead single entitled 143 which was premiered by Flood Magazine and The 405. It was met with critical acclaim and made several “best of 2019" lists including Nicorola and DKFM. The single is also being played on BBC Music Introducing East Midlands & Sveriges Radio P3 in Stockholm.

In January 2020, the duo released their second single entitled Hold Me Like You Know Me which garnered comparisons to Phil Spector’s Wall of Sound and David Lynch’s Twin Peaks.

=== Singles ===
Year	Single
2019	143
2020	Hold Me Like You Know Me

== See also ==
- Dream pop
- Shoegazing
