= Rhino 39 =

- Origin: Long Beach, California
- Genres: Punk rock, Hardcore punk, “Proto-hardcore”
- Years active: Late 1970s - 1980s, through late 1990s, 2014–present.
- Labels: Dangerhouse, Triple X, Bemisbrain, Bomp, Nickle and Dime, Frontier, Munster, Artifix, Mediadumpster
- Members: Mark R. Malone, Tim Carhart, Jason Scharback, Matt Goss
- Past members: Dave Bratton, Joel Bratton, Larry Parrot

Rhino 39 was among the wave of punk bands originating in the Los Angeles, California area in the late 1970s. The band was notable for recording an early hardcore punk single ("Xerox"/"No Compromise") on the Dangerhouse label. Members Mark R. Malone (bass), Larry Parrot (guitar), Tim Carhart (drums) were with the band throughout its tenure. Original singer Dave Bratton (also known by his stage name, Dave Dacron) died in an auto accident in April, 1980, after which his younger brother Joel Bratton took on the role of vocalist and sang on their self-titled LP. In the 1990s, Jason Scharback took over as vocalist and later Matt Goss (Aggressive Bastards) joined as guitarist for a Dangerhouse reunion in 2014 to present. Rhino 39 is known for its good musicianship and anger-free, light-hearted showmanship.

Rhino 39's Millikan High School classmate, Jack Grisham, the vocalist for the punk rock band T.S.O.L. (True Sounds of Liberty) was inspired in part to start his own band when Rhino 39 performed at a Winter party he held in the late 1970s — the flyer touted Rhino as "dead band". After finding success in later years, Grisham and T.S.O.L. often tapped Rhino 39 as their supporting act.
