= Korean American Presbyterian Church =

- Classification: Protestant
- Orientation: Calvinist
- Theology: Evangelical Reformed
- Polity: Presbyterian
- Associations: NAPARC
- Region: United States, Canada, Latin America, Philippines, Asia, Russia
- Origin: 1978; Philadelphia, Pennsylvania
- Branched from: Presbyterian Church in Korea
- Congregations: 650 (2021)
- Members: 80,000 (2021)
- Official website: www.kapc.org

The Korean American Presbyterian Church (KAPC) is a conservative Presbyterian denomination in the United States and Canada.

== History ==
The Korean American Presbyterian Church was formed in 1978 by Korean immigrants on the campus of Westminster Seminary in Philadelphia, Pennsylvania. On its founding date the church consisted of five presbyteries: the Presbytery of California, the Central Presbytery, New York Presbytery, Presbytery of Philadelphia, and Canada Presbytery. The denomination is a conservative, doctrinally driven church. In the late 1990s, the church consisted of 19 presbyteries not just in North and South America, but also in Russia and Europe. In 1983, it joined the North American Presbyterian and Reformed Council.

Looking at the expansion history of this denomination, which started with five presbyteries and went through 31 presbyteries, after the establishment of the General Assembly with more than five presbyteries in 1978, the North California Presbytery was separated from the Korean-American Presbytery in the same year. Subsequently, in 1981, the Southeastern Presbytery was separated from the New York Presbytery, and in 1982, the Southern Presbytery was separated from the Korean-American Presbytery. In 1983, the Mid-America Presbytery joined the denomination. In 1984, the Capital Area Presbytery was separated from the New York Presbytery, and in 1985, the denomination, which was then based in North America, expanded its reach to Central and South America, and the Paraguay Presbytery joined the denomination. In 1987, the Southern California Presbytery was separated from the Korean-American Presbytery, and in 1989, the South America Presbytery joined the denomination, but it was merged with the Central and South America Presbytery in 1990. In 1991, the Europe Presbytery joined the denomination, and in 1992, the New York City Presbytery joined as a conference from the New York Presbytery, and the following year, in 1993, the New York Presbytery was renamed the New York East Presbytery, and it expanded into two presbyteries. In 1994, the Western California Presbytery was separated from the Korean-American Presbytery, and in the same year, the Brazil Presbytery joined the denomination. In 1996, the Hawaii Presbytery and the Eastern Canada Presbytery joined the denomination, and in the same year, the New England Presbytery was separated from the New York East Presbytery. In 1998, the New Zealand Presbytery joined the denomination, and in 1999, the Eastern North America Presbytery, which was affiliated with the Presbyterian Church in Korea, dissolved itself and decided to join the local presbytery, and the Northwestern Presbytery of the denomination joined, merging with the Korean-American Presbytery to become the Northwestern Presbytery, and in the same year, the New York City Presbytery and the Northeast Presbytery also merged and were renamed the New York City Presbytery. In 2000, the Pennsylvania Presbytery was separated from the Philadelphia Presbytery, and in 2002, an English Presbytery was established to meet the needs of second-generation Korean-Americans. In 2003, the English Council was established under the name of the North American Council. The North California Council was divided into the East and West Councils, and the Los Angeles Council was also established from the California Council. In 2005, the North California West Council was divided into the North and South Councils, and in 2008, the Washington Council was established from the Capital Council. In 2009, the Pacific Council joined and allowed the establishment of the New York East Council. In 2012, the LA Central Council was established from the Los Angeles Council, and the Rocky Mountain Council was established from the Central Council. In 2013, the Cami Council was established from the Northwest Council, and in 2014, the Garden Council was established from the New York Council and the East Coast Council was established from the West Coast Council. In 2015, the North and South California Councils were integrated into the North California Council. In 2017, the Southwest Council was established from the Southern California Council, and in 2018, the Southeast Asia Council was renamed the Asia Council. In 2019, the Los Angeles Council and the LA Central Council were merged into the Los Angeles Council. In 2020, the North American Council was divided into the North American East and West Councils.

== Statistics ==
In California the church it used to maintains its own Seminary. The denomination also maintains accredited seminaries in Northern California, Chicago, and New York, but accepts other conservative Seminary graduate pastors after examination. According to KAPC statistics for 2010, the denomination had 53,000 baptized members, 600 affiliated congregations. The church has ministries in the US army, and chaplains. It experienced rapid growth. The church now has 31 presbyteries, included 6 presbyteries in Southern California, 1 presbyteries in Northern California, a Presbytery in Hawaii, it has 15 presbyteries in the Eastern American states, a Central Presbytery, Southern and Southeastern US Presbyteries, it has in Brazil a Brazilian Presbytery, one in the Philippines, and the Latin America Presbytery and the Presbytery of New Zealand,. In 2002, an English language Presbytery was launched. It has missions in 19 countries.

In 2021, the denomination estimated a total of 80,000 members (70,000 communicants and 10,000 non-communicants).

The main office of the General Secretary located in Las Vegas, Nevada.

== Doctrine ==
The church adheres to the Westminster Confession of Faith, Westminster Larger Catechism, Westminster Shorter Catechism.

== See also ==
- Reformed Presbyterian Church in Paraguay
- Korean United Church of Chile
