= Black Randy and the Metrosquad =

American punk rock band

Background information
- Origin: Los Angeles, California, U.S.
- Genres: Punk rock
- Years active: 1977–1982
- Label: Dangerhouse
- Past members: Black Randy; David Brown; Bob Deadwyler; Pat Garrett; KK Barrett; Joe Ramirez; Tom Hughes; Joe Nanini

Black Randy and the Metrosquad was an American punk rock band from the late 1970s and early 1980s in the Los Angeles punk scene. They gained notoriety not only for their surreal and smutty sense of humor, but also for their amalgamation of proto-punk, 1970s porn, pop, and avant-garde music.

== History ==
The band formed in Los Angeles in 1977 with Black Randy (born John Morris, January 5, 1952 - November 11, 1988) as frontman, David Brown on keyboards, and other members, including Pat Garrett, on guitar. However, the band had a rotating line-up, which even included live back-up singers known as the Blacketts which often included Exene Cervenka, Alice Bag, Lorna Doom, Belinda Carlisle, Jane Wiedlin, and featured several members of The Eyes.

Black Randy's lyrics gave him a reputation for being as witty as he was offensive with songs about porn, Marlon Brando, and Idi Amin. Their first single, "Trouble at the Cup", advocated fighting the police, describing a fantasy wherein street hustlers on Hollywood Boulevard would rise up and take violent revenge for the frequent police harassment they experienced. He also covered James Brown's "Say It Loud - I'm Black and I'm Proud". The band also covered various porn music themes from the 1970s.

They released many vinyl singles and cassette tapes from 1977 onwards which were later compiled on an album called, Pass the Dust, I Think I'm Bowie, which had sophisticated and even innovative musical arrangements that had more in common with post-punk than hardcore bands like Black Flag. This album led to the band being the most represented act on Dangerhouse Records, the label established by Brown and Garrett. This was the label's only album release, though this was not due to nepotism, but rather to bands with major-label aspirations worrying that being associated with Black Randy's offensive songs could jeopardize their chances of being signed. The band appeared in Lou Adler's 1981 satirical punk rock film Ladies and Gentlemen, The Fabulous Stains, performing "I Slept in an Arcade". Pass the Dust... was reissued in 2004 by Sympathy for the Record Industry, and as a double LP by Vinyl Countdown Records in 2009, including the original album, the Dangerhouse singles, demos, live material, and a Black Randy phone call. Frontier Records reissued the album in 2016 on transparent pink vinyl, including a digital download with the non-LP Dangerhouse singles as bonus tracks, with a limited cassette edition co-released with Burger Records.

The band imploded in mid-1982, when their frontman succumbed to drug and alcohol problems, which were evident in chaotic live shows, where songs were hardly sung and Brown tried, to no avail, to salvage the show. Morris died on November 11, 1988, of complications from AIDS. Black Randy was portrayed by Chris Pontius in the film What We Do Is Secret, a biopic of Darby Crash.

== Discography ==
=== Albums ===
- Pass the Dust, I Think I'm Bowie (1979), Dangerhouse – reissued (2004), Sympathy for the Record Industry, (2009), Dangerhouse|Elective Affinities Corp. (cassette) 2015, Vinyl Countdown, (2016), Frontier Records, (2016), Burger/Frontier (cassette).

=== Singles ===
- "Trouble at the Cup" (1977), Dangerhouse.
- Idi Amin EP (1978), Dangerhouse – as Black Randy & his Elite Metrosquad.
- "I Slept in an Arcade" (1979), Dangerhouse.

=== Various artists compilation appearances ===
- "Down at the Laundrymat", on Yes L.A. (1979), Dangerhouse.
