= The Ugly Americans in Australia =

Live album by Wall of Voodoo
- Released: 1988
- Recorded: 1987
- Venue: Palace Theatre, Melbourne; Big Joe's Bar 'n Grill, Bullhead City, Arizona
- Length: 37:13 (LP); 46:31 (CD/CS)
- Label: IRS
- Producer: Wall of Voodoo, Barry Rudolph

Wall of Voodoo chronology
Happy Planet (1987)	The Ugly Americans in Australia (1988)	The Index Masters (1991)

The Ugly Americans in Australia is a live album by American rock band Wall of Voodoo, mostly recorded at The Palace, St Kilda in Melbourne in August 1987, during the group's Australian tour.

== Background ==
Bassist Bruce Moreland had departed the group again by this stage, and in order for Chas T. Gray to play bass in addition to his normal keyboard duties, the group took on guest keyboardist Roger Mason from popular Australian band the Models.

Two of the album's tracks, "Living in the Red" and "The Heart Never Can Tell", were recorded at Big Joe's Bar 'n Grill in Bullhead City, Arizona. The CD and cassette versions included another two tracks from Bullhead: "The Grass Is Greener" and a cover of Woody Guthrie's "Pretty Boy Floyd".

The album was dedicated to renowned German producer Conny Plank, who had died in December 1987. Plank had not worked with Wall of Voodoo, but his productions for such German progressive/experimental bands as Kraftwerk, Neu!, Cluster, Harmonia and Guru Guru were an influence on the group's music.

The album title and sleeve notes make reference to the bestselling 1958 exposé The Ugly American, by Eugene Burdick and William J. Lederer. The front cover painting was by iconic artist Robert Williams, featuring a vicious clown beating another with his fists while female conjoined twins in skimpy attire look on with astonished looks. The full title of Williams' painting is "An Allegory of Contradictions Revealing Serendipity Purveyors of Mirth Presenting a Tableau of Blood and Grease Paint in a Circusian Clash to the Death", while the colloquial title is "Duelling Bimbos".

This album completed the band's contract with IRS Records, and they disbanded by mid-1988.

== Track listing ==
Side one
No.	Title	Writer(s)	Length
1.	"Red Light"	Stan Ridgway, Marc Moreland, Bruce Moreland, Joe Nanini, Chas T. Gray	3:45
2.	"Crazy, Crazy Melbourne"	Jim Field, Andy Prieboy	0:53
3.	"Wrong Way to Hollywood"	Gray, Field, Prieboy	4:37
4.	"Living in the Red"	Gray, Prieboy	3:50
5.	"Blackboard Sky"	Prieboy	4:45

CD/cassette bonus track
No.	Title	Writer(s)	Length
6.	"Pretty Boy Floyd"	Woody Guthrie	5:19

Side two
No.	Title	Writer(s)	Length
1.	"The Heart Can Never Tell"	Gray, Neil Leukhardt, M. and B. Moreland	4:35
2.	"Far Side of Crazy"	Prieboy	4:17
3.	"Ring of Fire"	June Cash, Merle Kilgore	5:47
4.	"Mexican Radio"	Ridgway, M. Moreland, Nanini, Gray	4:44

CD/cassette bonus track
No.	Title	Writer(s)	Length
5.	"The Grass Is Greener"	Gray, Leukhardt, M. Moreland, Prieboy	4:40

- In 2012, the album was remastered and re-released by Australian reissue label Raven Records as part of a double CD set with the previous albums Seven Days in Sammystown and Happy Planet, as well as three non album bonus tracks.

== Personnel ==
Wall of Voodoo

- Chas T. Gray – keyboards, backing vocals, bass guitar
- Ned Leukhardt – drums, percussion
- Marc Moreland – guitars
- Andy Prieboy – vocals, keyboards

Additional musician

- Roger Mason – keyboards and backing vocals

Technical

- Barry Rudolph – co-producer, mixing
- Wall of Voodoo – co-producer, mixing
- Greg Edward – engineer
- Ernie Sheesly – co-engineer ("Living in the Red", "Pretty Boy Floyd", "The Heart Can Never Tell", "The Grass Is Greener")
- Ryan Greene – co-engineer ("Living in the Red", "Pretty Boy Floyd", "The Heart Can Never Tell", "The Grass Is Greener")
- Joseph Prieboy – back cover computer graphics
- Andy Prieboy – layout
- Ron Scarselli – layout
