= Authority Zero =

American punk rock band

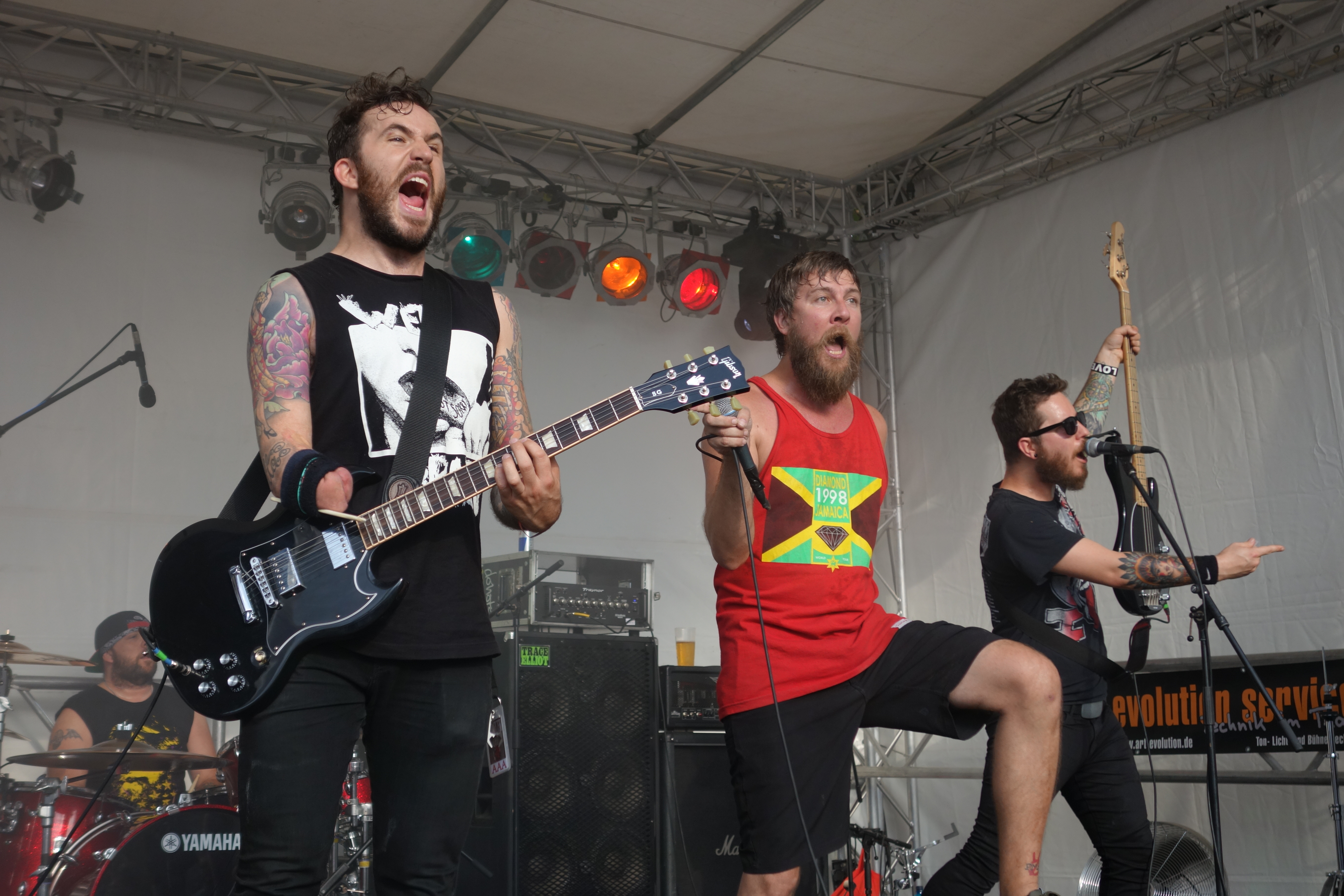

Background information
- Origin: Mesa, Arizona, U.S.
- Genres: Ska punk; skate punk; art punk; surf rock; punk rock; reggae rock
- Years active: 1994–present
- Labels: Lava; Atlantic; Big Panda; Suburban Noize; Viking Funeral; Hardline Entertainment; Bird Attack Records; Concrete Jungle Records
- Members: Jason DeVore; Mike Spero; Chris Dalley; Brandon Landelius
- Past members: Bryan Sandell; J. W. Gordon; Jerry Douglas; Bill Marcks; Dean Farmer; Zach Vogel; Jim Wilcox; Jeremy Wood; Dan Aid; Josh "Ralphie" Schneider; Chris Bartholomew; Chad Martin; Eric Walsh
- Website: authorityzero.com

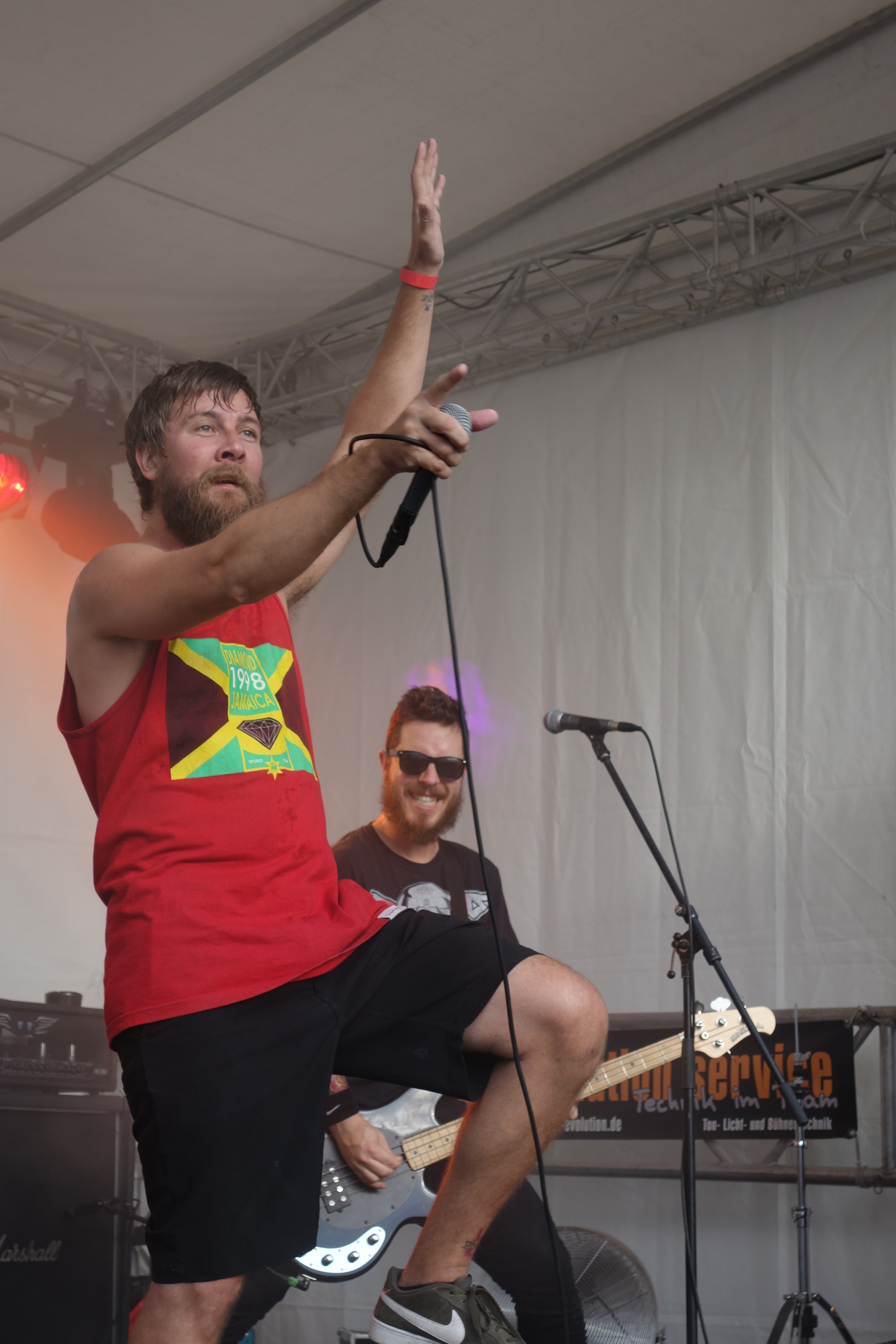
Singer Jason DeVore and bassist Mike Spero

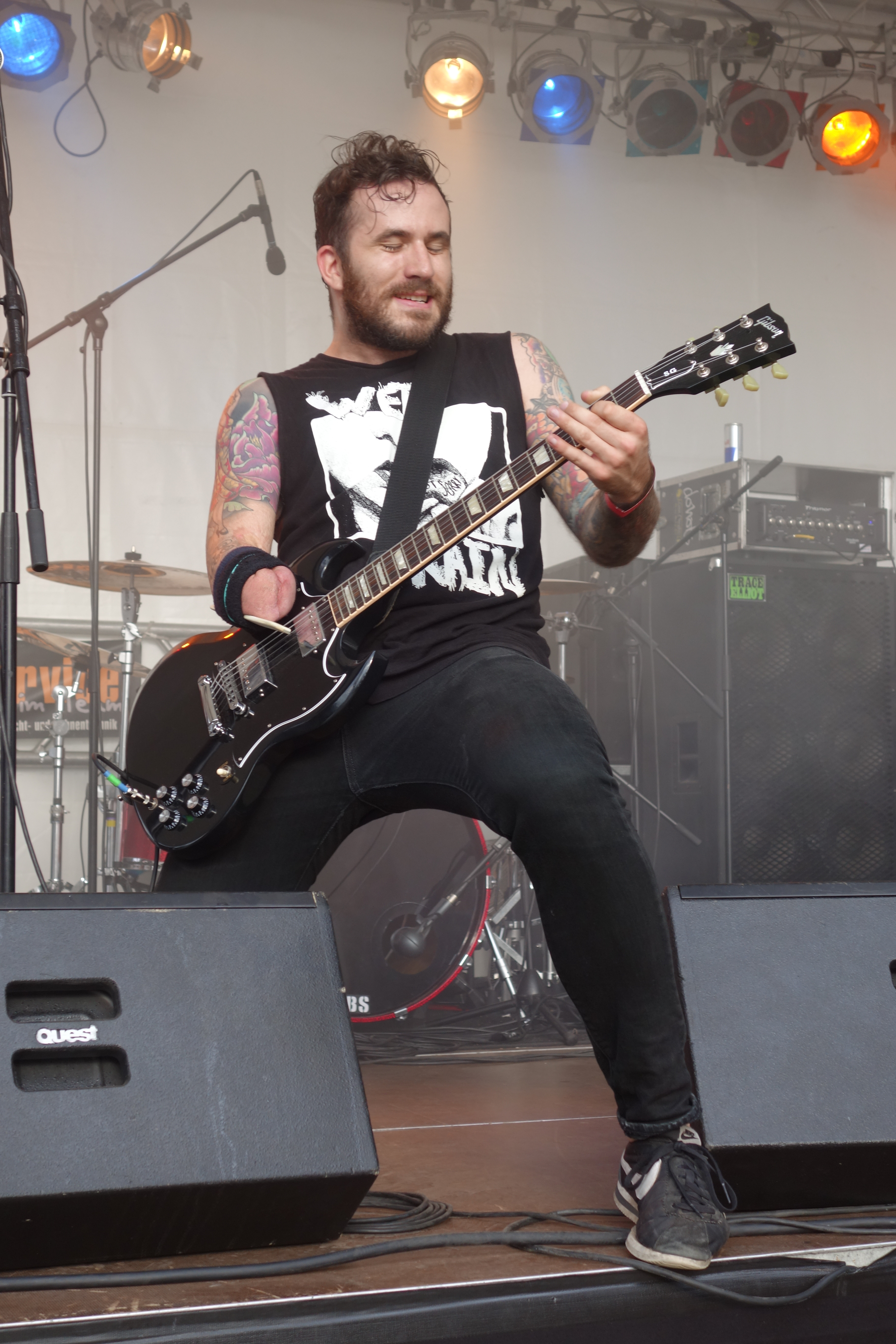
Guitarist Dan Aid

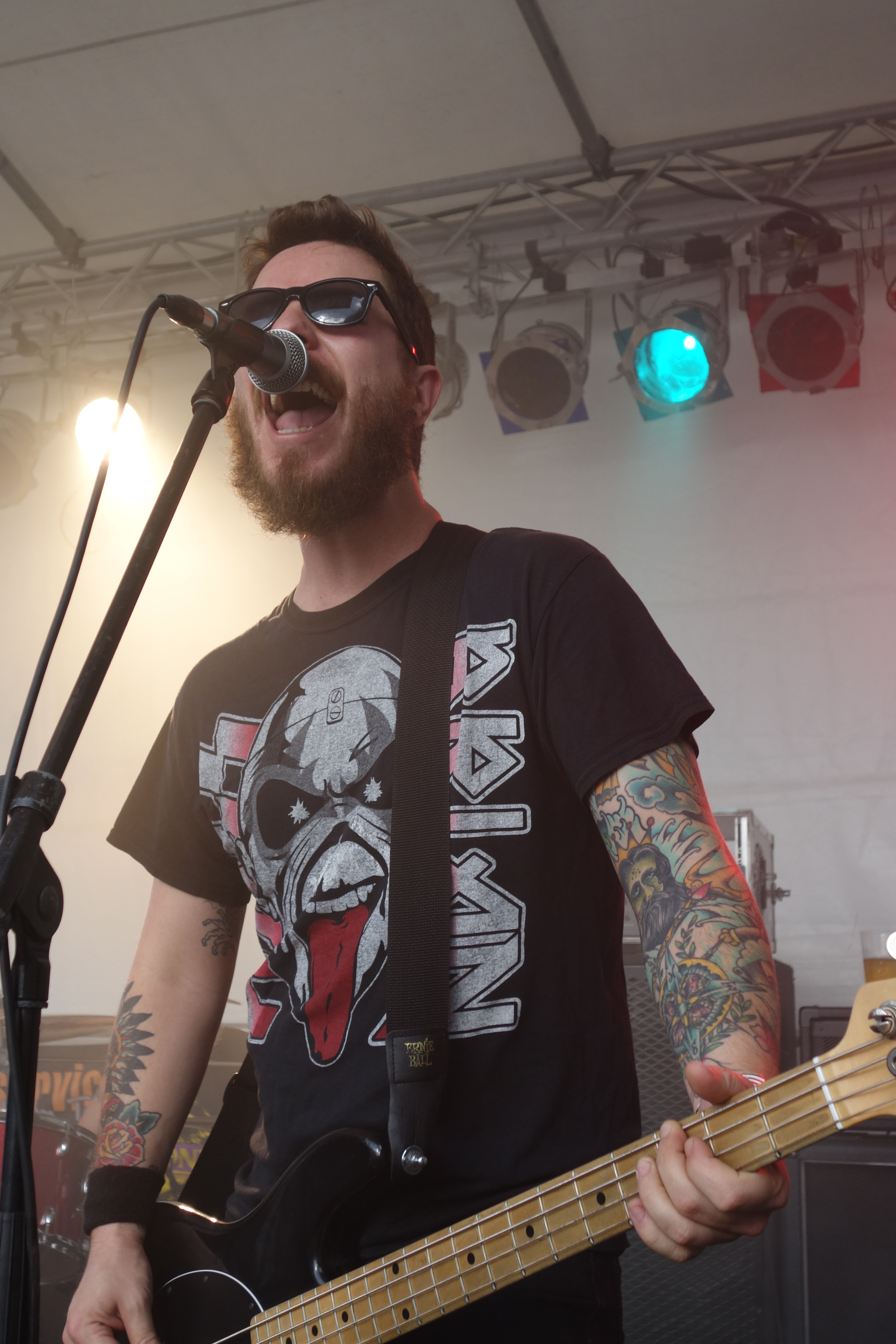
Mike Spero

Authority Zero is an American punk rock band from Mesa, Arizona, United States, formed in 1994. The band's style is rooted in reggae and skate punk, with Spanish/Portuguese influences. As of December 2025, they have released eight full-length studio albums, along with five live albums and numerous EPs, videos, and singles. The band regularly tours North America, Europe and Japan.

== History ==
=== Formation and early days (1994–1999) ===
Authority Zero was started in 1994 and consisted of two guitarists Bill Marcks, Jerry Douglas (also performing vocals) and drummer J.W. Gordon, all from Westwood High School. This trio put a few songs together without lyrics or basslines until the summer of 1995. When that summer rolled around, Douglas was expecting the yearly visit of his friend Jason DeVore, from Wyoming. Douglas introduced his long-time friend to Marcks who was asked if he wanted to be their singer.

Marcks was impressed with DeVore's ability to "write catchy songs in fifteen minutes with really sticky hooks". The two quickly enlisted Jeremy Wood on bass, who actually taught Marcks and Douglas how to play the guitar. His experience with lead guitar and musical theory separated his bass playing from others'. Not just a "follow along," his basslines were independent and yet fluid with the music. However, because of Gordon's commitment to the air force, his position as drummer soon had to be replaced. Classmate, skateboarder, and drummer Daniel Garcia fit this empty stool like a missing puzzle piece. He brought a new charge and tempo that evolved Authority Zero's music into a faster, more complex, punk rock style. Eventually, however, differences and family obligations led to Garcia's exit from the group.

Marcks, Douglas, DeVore, and Wood finally came upon Los Angeles native Jim Wilcox formerly of Welter/The New Militia and he completed the Authority Zero's lineup. Douglas also left the group and joined the air force.

=== Early success (1999–2004) ===
After releasing a local EP that sold very well, Authority Zero released their debut album A Passage In Time in 2002 on Lava Records. The album featured a blend of genres including punk rock and reggae, with obvious Spanish and Portuguese influences. A Passage In Time included the hits "One More Minute" and "Over Seasons”.

The success of A Passage In Time propelled the band into new popularity. Authority Zero appeared on many tours, such as Warped Tour, the No Use for a Name/The Starting Line tour, and Sum 41's "Sum on Your Face". The band has also toured with the likes of Everclear, Guttermouth and H_{2}O.

=== Andiamo (2004–2007) ===
In 2004, Authority Zero released Andiamo, again on Lava Records. "Andiamo" means literally "We go" in Italian, but can also be read as "And I am Zero", the title of their live DVD released following Andiamo. The album again featured a blend of genres and Spanish/Portuguese influences. Andiamo is somewhat politically charged, evident in the songs "Revolution", "A Thousand Years of War", and the cover of the song "Mexican Radio", originally written by Wall of Voodoo (the version that appears on Andiamo has lyric changes in order to make a statement against the 2003 invasion of Iraq). In the summer of 2006, Authority Zero released a live acoustic compilation album titled Rhythm and Booze on Suburban Noize Records.

=== 12:34, Marcks Departure (2007–2009) ===
The band's next album, entitled 12:34 was released on January 30, 2007. The track "Courage" was released as a single. The band toured with Rehab on the "Lack of Luxury" 2007 tour.

On December 30, 2008, Bill Marcks left the band to spend more time with his family. Bill Marcks currently plays guitar in the band Cero Viejo with former Authority Zero bassist Jeremy Wood.

=== Stories of Survival, and changing line up (2009–2012) ===
Authority Zero released its fourth studio album titled Stories of Survival on June 22, 2010, under management by Hardline Entertainment.

Authority Zero set out in 2011 on the "Swan" tour in support of a new album by Unwritten Law. According to sources within the band, they parted ways with Zach Vogel. He was replaced, by Brandon Landelius, a guitar player from The Mag Seven. Authority Zero's veteran drummer Jim Wilcox left the band in January 2012 to focus on Blue Collar Prophet his D.J. outfit. On March 1, 2012, the band announced Sean Sellers of Good Riddance and The Real McKenzies would be their full-time replacement behind the drums.

=== The Tipping Point (2013–2014) ===
Authority Zero released their album titled The Tipping Point on April 2, 2013, on Hardline Entertainment.

On Tuesday March 5, 2013, Jeremy Wood announced via Facebook that he has stepped down as bassist for the band again, citing personal differences, and the urge to spend more time with family, as well as explore his roots in the local music scene. Jeremy Wood now plays bass with his new band Cero Viejo ('Old Zero' in Spanish) with former Authority Zero guitarist Bill Marcks. During the band's March 7 listening party with Phoenix area online radio station KUKQ, Jason DeVore announced that Mike Spero will be taking over on bass full-time for the band.

The band released The Tipping Point on April 2, 2013. Authority Zero embarked on a European tour April 4, starting with dates in Russia before playing more conventional dates in Europe.

=== Tour van theft and Brandon Landelius's departure (2015) ===
In May 2015, the band recorded a live record as a 20th anniversary event at Club Red in Mesa, Arizona. The band included songs that spanned over the length of its 20-year history. It will be the band's first full band live album.

On July 21 while headlining The Summer Sickness tour with CounterPunch and Rubedo, Authority Zero's tour van and trailer were stolen in San Antonio, Texas. The van and trailer were recovered a few days later, but was damaged and the trailer had been emptied – more than $50,000 of music equipment and merchandise was stolen. Authority Zero pushed on and decided to finish the tour with help from CounterPunch lending them their gear.

During 2015, updates from DeVore hinted at a new Authority Zero record. On his Instagram he included pictures of the band in a rehearsal space demoing songs, and writing.

After joining the band in 2011, Brandon Landelius announced on November 4, 2015, that following the Canadian tour he will no longer be continuing with the band. However, due to travel issues caused by the COVID-19 pandemic, he has filled in for Dan Aid during live-streamed shows.

=== Broadcasting to the Nations (2016 – present) ===
On December 2, 2016, the band announced on their Facebook page that they have entered the Blasting Room to complete their sixth record. In April 2017, album art and title, Broadcasting to the Nations, was announced on the official Authority Zero website. Along with the release of the album art, the band released the first single "Bayside." Then on June 2, 2017, it was officially released.

On January 13, 2021, Jason Devore announced the departure of guitarist Dan Aid to pursue other endeavors. Eric Walsh became their new guitarist.

In April 2021, the band announced a new EP entitled The Back Nine. The following month, they announced an album entitled Ollie Ollie Oxen Free, which was released on June 18, 2021.

In May 2023, Authority Zero performed on stage with Alex Etheridge, a 13-year-old Phoenix musician who wrote music about his experience with bone cancer. He had originally recorded with Minneapolis rock band Soul Asylum. Alex died on July 19, 2023.

== Band members ==
Current

- Jason DeVore – vocals (1994–present)
- Brandon Landelius – guitars (2011–2015, 2022–present)
- Mike Spero – bass (2013–present)
- Chris Dalley – drums (2015–present)

Former

- Jeremy Wood – bass (1994–2006, 2009–2013)
- Dean "DJ" Farmer – bass (2006–2009)
- Josh "Ralphie" Schneider – bass (2007)
- J. W. Gordon – drums (1994–1996)
- Daniel Garcia – drums (1996–1999)
- Jim Wilcox – drums (1999–2012)
- Chris Bartholomew – drums (2012)
- Sean Sellers – drums (2012–2015)
- Chad Martin – drums (2015)
- Jerry Douglas – guitars (1994–1999)
- Bill Marcks – guitars (1994–2008)
- Bryan Sandell – guitars (2006–2008)
- Zach Vogel – guitars (2008–2011)
- Dan Aid – guitars (2016–2020)
- Eric Walsh – guitars (2021–2022)

Timeline

== Discography ==
=== Studio albums ===
Year	Album details	Peak chart positions
Year	Album details	US Heatseeker
2002	A Passage in Time: Released: September 10, 2002; Label: Lava/Atlantic; Format: CD	30
2004	Andiamo: Released: June 29, 2004; Label: Lava; Format: CD	24
2007	12:34: Released: January 30, 2007; Label: Big Panda; Format: CD	40
2010	Stories of Survival: Released: June 22, 2010; Label: Suburban Noize Records/Viking Funeral Records; Format: CD	5
2013	The Tipping Point: Release: April 2, 2013; Label: Hardline Entertainment; Format: CD, LP	15
2017	Broadcasting to the Nations: Release: June 2, 2017; Label: Bird Attack Records; Format: CD, LP	2
2018	Persona Non Grata: Release: December 7, 2018; Label: Concrete Jungle Records; Format: CD, LP	48
2021	Ollie Ollie Oxen Free: Release: June 18, 2021; Format: CD, LP	-
"—" denotes releases that did not chart.

=== Live-acoustic albums ===
Year	Album details	Peak chart positions
Year	Album details	US Heatseeker
2006	Rhythm and Booze: Released: June 26, 2006; Label: Suburban Noize Records; Format: CD	-
2012	Less Rhythm, More Booze: Released: January 21, 2012; Label: Viking Funeral Records; Format: CD & DVD	-
2018	R&B III: Released: April 27, 2018; Label: Self-released; Format: CD	-
"—" denotes releases that did not chart.

=== Singles ===
- "One More Minute" (2002)
- "Over Seasons" (2003)
- "Revolution" (2004)
- "Mexican Radio" (2004)
- "Get It Right" (2010)
- "Big Bad World" (2011)
- "Bayside" (2017)
- "Atom Bomb" (2018)
- "Ah Hell" (2018)
- "Ollie Ollie Oxen Free" (2021)
- "Apocalyptic Summer" (2026)

=== DVDs ===
- 2005: (And) I Am Zero (2005)

=== Music videos ===
- "Over Seasons" (2002)
- "One More Minute" (2002)
- "Revolution" (2004)
- "Painted Windows" (2004)
- "The Bravery" (2007)
- "No Regrets" (2007)
- "Sirens" (2008)
- "Get It Right" (2010)
- "Big Bad World" (2011)
- "Today We Heard The News" (2013)
- "No Other Place" (2014)
- "Lift One Up" (2014)
- "When We Rule The World" (2017)
- "First One In The Pit" (2017)
- "Ah Hell" (2019)
- "Ollie Ollie Oxen Free" (2021)
- "Destiny and Demise" (2022)
- "Fire Off Another" (2022)

=== Demos ===
- 1999: Live Your Life
- 2001: Patches in Time

== Appearances in other media ==
- The song "A Passage in Time" appeared on the video game Project Gotham Racing 2
- The song "A Passage in Time" has been professional wrestler Takeshi Rikio's theme song since 2004.
- The song "Everyday" appeared on the 2003 video game Tony Hawk's Underground.
- The song "Revolution" appeared on Fat Wreck Chords Rock Against Bush, Vol. 1 compilation and in the game MX vs. ATV Unleashed.
- The song "Revolution" appeared on an episode of "Smallville" in season 4.
- A demo version of the song "Solitude" appeared on the 2003 Vans Warped Tour Compilation.
- The songs "12:34" and "On Edge" appeared on the video game MX vs. ATV Untamed.
- The song "La Surf" appeared in the movie "Grind"
- The song "No Regrets" appeared on the "Supporting Radical Habits, vol 2" CD.
- "No Regrets" is featured as one of the 20 songs of free downloadable content on Rock Band 2.
- The song "Sirens" appears in the Athertons' section in the mountain bike film New World Disorder 9.
- The songs "Taking on the World" and "Madman" are featured in Season 1 of the mountain bike show Stund.
- An acoustic version of the song "Big Bad World" appears on "The Edge 103.9 – Acoustic Live and Rare 2008". "Big Bad World" is a previously unreleased song.
