= Andiamo (album) =

Studio album by Authority Zero
- Released: June 30, 2004
- Genres: Punk rock, ska punk, reggae
- Length: 41:02
- Label: Lava
- Producers: Ryan Greene; Michael Happoldt

Authority Zero chronology
A Passage in Time (2002)	Andiamo (2004)	Rhythm and Booze (2005)

Singles from Andiamo
- 1. "Revolution" Released: May 17, 2004; 2. "Mexican Radio" Released: August 23, 2004

[Clean] Version Cover
- Clean Version Album Cover

Professional ratings
Review scores
Source	Rating
AllMusic	3.5/5 stars
PopMatters	(mixed)

Andiamo is the second studio album released by punk band Authority Zero. It was released on June 30, 2004, on Lava Records and includes the single "Revolution" (which is also included on the compilation album Rock Against Bush, Vol. 1) and a cover of the Wall of Voodoo song "Mexican Radio", with small lyrical changes included to include the song as the band's statement against the 2003 invasion of Iraq. The album title is Italian and means, literally, "we go," but can also be translated as "let's go." The title of the album can be split to read "And I Am 0" ("And I Am Zero"), as seen faintly in the CD insert. (And) I Am Zero is the name of Authority Zero's live DVD, which was released in 2005. "Revolution" and "Painted Windows" had music videos made.

== Track listing ==
1. "Painted Windows" - 3:51
2. "Revolution" - 2:25
3. "Find Your Way" - 4:15
4. "Madman" - 2:58
5. "Taking on the World" - 3:48
6. "Retreat!" - 4:48
7. "Society's Sequence" - 1:17
8. "A Thousand Years of War" - 3:15
9. "Mexican Radio" - 2:54
10. "Chile Con Crudo (Instrumental)" - 1:59
11. "Solitude" - 3:47
12. "Siempre Loco" - 0:49
13. "PCH-82" - 5:36
14. "Rattlin' Bog"* - 2:47

== Album art ==
The album's art is a play on Norman Rockwell's "No Swimming" image.

== Hidden track ==
At the end of the album there is a hidden track, "Rattlin' Bog". The track was recorded live at a concert in the band's home state of Arizona and mixed by Erik Toms at SJS Studios in Scottsdale.
