= Happy Planet (album) =

Studio album by Wall of Voodoo
- Released: 1987
- Studio: Hit City West, Los Angeles
- Length: 41:00
- Label: I.R.S.
- Producer: Richard Mazda

Wall of Voodoo chronology
Seven Days in Sammystown (1985)	Happy Planet (1987)	The Ugly Americans in Australia (1989)

Happy Planet is the fourth and final studio album by American rock band Wall of Voodoo, released in 1987. It marked the return of producer Richard Mazda, who had produced their 1982 album Call of the West.

Although not as successful as Call of the West, Happy Planet did produce a minor hit with a cover of the Beach Boys' "Do It Again". The album, recorded at Hit City West, reached No. 83 on the Australian charts.

== Brian Wilson connections ==
"Do It Again" is a cover of the Beach Boys' 1968 song, and its music video featured a guest appearance from Beach Boys leader and co-founder Brian Wilson. In the video, he plays an orderly in a psychiatric hospital who falls asleep and wakes up to the members of Wall of Voodoo dressed as members of the Mafia. The video was directed by Stephen Sayadian and the sets from this video were re-used in his 1989 film Dr. Caligari. Wilson, in real life, was admitted to psychiatric hospitals at least three times. The cover of the "Do It Again" single included photos of the band with Wilson. He is also referenced in the lyrics to "Chains of Luck" in the line, "Brian Wilson chants his mantra, 'Da doo ron ron, da doo ron ron'," a reference to Wilson's obsession with the work of music producer Phil Spector.

== Track listing ==
Side one

1. "Do It Again" (Brian Wilson, Mike Love) – 3:18
2. "Hollywood the Second Time" (Andy Prieboy) – 4:06
3. "Empty Room" (Bruce Moreland) – 3:53
4. "Chains of Luck" (Chas T. Gray, Ned Leukhardt, Prieboy) – 3:55
5. "Back in the Laundromat" (Prieboy) – 3:20 [CD only bonus track]
6. "When the Lights Go Out" (Marc Moreland, Prieboy) – 3:19

Side two

1. "Country of Man" (M. Moreland) – 3:29
2. "Joanne" (Prieboy) – 3:40
3. "Elvis Bought Dora a Cadillac" (M. Moreland, Prieboy) – 3:42
4. "The Grass Is Greener" (Gray, Leukhardt, M. Moreland, Prieboy) – 3:40
5. "Ain't My Day" (M. Moreland) – 4:38
- In 2012, the album was remastered and re-released by Australian reissue label Raven Records as part of a double CD set with previous album Seven Days in Sammystown, live album The Ugly Americans in Australia and three non-album bonus tracks.

== Personnel ==
Wall of Voodoo

- Andy Prieboy – vocals, keyboards, piano
- Marc Moreland – guitar
- Bruce Moreland – bass guitar
- Chas T. Gray – keyboards, vocals
- Ned Leukhardt – drums, percussion, machines

Additional musicians

- Jeff Rymes – additional vocals
- Randy Weeks – additional vocals
- Lyn Todd – additional vocals
- Yolanda Pittman – additional vocals
- Bill Pittman – bass ("Country of Man")

Technical

- Richard Mazda – producer, co-arranger, various instruments and vocals
- Peter Kelsey – engineer
- Stephen Sayadian – cover concept and design
- Wall of Voodoo – co-arrangers, design layout
- Steve Hall – mastering
- Ladi Von Jansky – photography
- Ron Scarselli – design layout
- Belinda Williams Sayadian – styling

== Charts ==
Chart (1985)	Peak position
Australia (Kent Music Report)	83
