= Randy Weeks =

American singer and songwriter

- Born: Randall Barry Weeks; Windom, Minnesota
- Genres: Rock music, country music, blues music
- Occupation: Musician
- Instruments: Guitar, vocals
- Years active: 1986–present
- Labels: HighTone Records, Certifiable Records
- Member of: The Lonesome Strangers
- Website: randyweeks.com

Randy Weeks is an American singer and songwriter. Lucinda Williams (who covered Weeks' song "Can't Let Go") has said: "Randy Weeks writes amazingly well crafted, beautifully melodic songs and delivers them with his own brand of laid back vocals and surfboard cool, very hip approach."

== Biography ==
Weeks was born and raised in Windom, Minnesota. He first played the drums, and by age 16 he performed in a local country band. Weeks moved to Minneapolis, where he switched to guitar, and played in hard rock bands. He then moved to Los Angeles to further pursue his music career.

=== Lonesome Strangers ===
After Weeks met Jeff Rymes, they formed the Los Angeles country-rock band Lonesome Strangers. In 1985, the Strangers recorded their first album, Lonesome Pine (Wrestler). Pete Anderson included the band on the compilation album A Town South of Bakersfield. After that, Hightone offered them a contract and they cut the album The Lonesome Strangers and Land of Opportunity in 1997.

=== Session work and songwriting ===
Weeks toured with Dwight Yoakam, and contributed vocals to Yoakam's albums Buenas Noches from a Lonely Room and Under the Covers. He sang and played on the 1989 self-titled album by Chris Gaffney and the Cold Hard Facts, which featured Weeks' song "I Was Just Feeling Good."

=== Solo career ===
Weeks' debut solo album Madeline was released by HighTone Records in 2000. It also featured Tony Gilkyson (guitar), Kip Boardman (bass), and Don Heffington (drums).

Weeks' "Can’t Let Go" was the sole cover song and biggest hit on Lucinda Williams’ Grammy-winning album, Car Wheels on a Gravel Road. The song was also performed by Robert Plant and Alison Krauss on their 2021 album Raise the Roof.

From 2002 until 2006, Weeks played bi-monthly Saturday gigs at the Cinema Bar in Culver City. When film director Peter Farrelly saw Weeks perform there, he included a Weeks song on the Shallow Hal film soundtrack. Other films such as Stuck on You, Sunshine State, and Jack Frost also feature Weeks’ songs.

Weeks self-released Sold Out at the Cinema in 2004, and followed it with Sugarfinger (produced by Jamie Candiloro) in 2006.

Upon relocating to Austin, Texas from Los Angeles in 2007, Weeks signed with Certifiable Records, and released the album Going My Way in 2009. Helping out were Will Sexton, Eliza Gilkyson, Cindy Cashdollar, Rick Richards, and Mark Hallman.

== Discography ==
=== Solo Recordings ===
- 2000: Madeline (HighTone)
- 2004: Sold Out at the Cinema (self-released)
- 2006: Sugarfinger (self-released)
- 2009: Going My Way (Certifiable)

=== The Lonesome Strangers ===
- 1986: Lonesome Pine (Wrestler)
- 1989: The Lonesome Strangers (HighTone)
- 1997: Land Of Opportunity (Mercury)

=== As composer ===
- 1990: Chris Gaffney - Chris Gaffney and the Cold Hard Facts (Rom) - track 6, "I Was Just Feeling Good" (co-written with Chris Gaffney and Wyman Reese)
- 1998: Lucinda Williams - Car Wheels on a Gravel Road (Mercury) - track 7, "Can't Let Go"
- 2014: Beth Hart and Joe Bonamassa - Live in Amsterdam (J&R Adventures) - track 1-04, "Can't Let Go"
- 2021: Robert Plant and Alison Krauss - Raise the Roof - track 1-06, "Can't Let Go"

=== Also appears on ===
- 1987: Wall Of Voodoo - Happy Planet (I.R.S.)
- 1988: Dwight Yoakam - Buenas Noches From a Lonely Room (Reprise)
- 1994: Pete Anderson - Working Class (Little Dog)
- 1997: Dwight Yoakam: Under the Covers (Reprise)
- 2002: Ramsay Midwood - Shoot Out at the OK Chinese Restaurant (Vanguard)
- 2006: Ramsay Midwood - Popular Delusions & the Madness Of Cows (Farmwire)
- 2009: Peter Fahey - Thunder Underneath (Lotus Dweller)
- 2006: Tony Gilkyson - Goodbye Guitar (Rolling Sea)
- 2015: various artists - Cold And Bitter Tears: The Songs Of Ted Hawkins (Eight 30) - track 7, "I Got What I Wanted"
