= Rhythm and Booze =

Live album by Authority Zero
- Released: February 2005; June 27, 2006 (re-release)
- Genres: Punk rock, skate punk, ska punk, reggae
- Length: 61:22
- Label: Suburban Noize

Authority Zero chronology
Andiamo (2004)	Rhythm and Booze (2005)	12:34 (2007)

Professional ratings
Review scores
Source	Rating
AllMusic	3.5/5 stars

Rhythm and Booze is a live acoustic album by Authority Zero. It was released by Suburban Noize Records in February 2005, and re-released on June 27, 2006. Except for "Paddy On The Railway" and "Broken Dreams," this album features acoustic versions of songs from Authority Zero's earlier releases, A Passage In Time and Andiamo.

The final release of this record features slightly different edits from the original release.

== Track listing ==
1. "Intro" – 0:46
2. "A Passage in Time" – 3:52
3. "Retreat" – 4:54
4. "Siempre Loco" – 3:29
5. "Find Your Way" – 4:17
6. "Painted Windows" – 3:59
7. "Mesa Town" – 2:45
8. "One More Minute" – 6:56
9. "Superbitch" – 5:56
10. "Revolution" – 3:12
11. "Paddy on the Railway" – 3:57
12. "Over Seasons" – 4:06
13. "Everyday" – 4:12
14. "PCH-82" – 4:33
15. "Broken Dreams" – 4:28
