= Dark Continent (album) =

Studio album by Wall of Voodoo
- Released: August 18, 1981
- Recorded: 1981
- Genre: Post-punk
- Length: 35:50
- Label: I.R.S.
- Producer: Jim Hill, Paul McKenna, Wall of Voodoo

Wall of Voodoo chronology
Wall of Voodoo (1980)	Dark Continent (1981)	Call of the West (1982)

Dark Continent is the debut studio album by the American rock band Wall of Voodoo, released in 1981 by I.R.S. Records. Early live versions of four songs ("Red Light", "Animal Day", "Back in Flesh" and "Call Box (1-2-3)") are featured on the compilation The Index Masters.

== Reception ==
Professional ratings
Review scores
Source	Rating
AllMusic	4.5/5 stars
Classic Rock	5/10 stars

In a 1981 review in Trouser Press, Jon Young said, "[t]his deadpan opus is either a joke or just another pretentious search for meaning." He continued, "Wall of Voodoo will need a better sense of the absurd to attain true strangeness. Here they just don't go far enough." In a later review in The Trouser Press Guide to New Wave Records (1983), Young stated that Dark Continent displayed "more polish" than the band's debut EP and benefited from "colorfully morose guitar and keyboards."

In a retrospective review, Greg Adams of AllMusic declared Dark Continent to be Wall of Voodoo's greatest album, pointing to strong songwriting and an original voice and style. Conversely, Geoff Barton of Classic Rock magazine opined that the first two Wall of Voodoo albums did not age well; he found Ridgway's singing style "intensely irritating" and the music "too clever-clever for comfort."

Dark Continent reached number 177 on the Billboard 200 chart.

== Promotion ==
A music video was produced for the song "Call Box (1-2-3)". The band performed "Back in Flesh" in the 1981 concert film Urgh! A Music War.

== Reissues ==
The album was first issued on CD by A&M Records in 1992. In 2009, Australian label Raven Records reissued Dark Continent and the second Wall of Voodoo album, Call of the West, together on one CD, featuring a full color booklet with liner notes by Ian McFarlane. Both albums were digitally remastered.

== Track listing ==
All tracks written by Wall of Voodoo.

Side one

1. "Red Light" – 3:08
2. "Two Minutes Till Lunch" – 2:55
3. "Animal Day" – 3:13
4. "Full of Tension" – 2:14
5. "Me and My Dad" – 3:20
6. "Back in Flesh" – 3:42

Side two

1. "Tse Tse Fly" – 4:46
2. "Call Box (1-2-3)" – 2:32
3. "This Way Out" – 3:56
4. "Good Times" – 2:29
5. "Crack the Bell" – 3:33

== Personnel ==
Wall of Voodoo

- Stanard Ridgway – vocals, keyboards, harmonica
- Marc Moreland – guitar
- Bruce Moreland – bass guitar, keyboards
- Chas Gray – keyboards, synthesizers
- Joe Nanini – drums, percussion

Technical

- Jim Hill – co-producer, co-engineer
- Paul McKenna – co-producer, co-engineer
- Wall of Voodoo – co-producer
- Kirk Ferraioli – assistant engineer
- Scott Lindgren – photographs
- Phillip Culp – art direction, design
