= Seven Days in Sammystown =

Studio album by Wall of Voodoo
- Released: 1985
- Recorded: 1985
- Studios: Amazon (Liverpool); Konk (London)
- Length: 43:44
- Label: I.R.S.
- Producer: Ian Broudie

Wall of Voodoo chronology
Call of the West (1983)	Seven Days in Sammystown (1985)	Happy Planet (1987)

Seven Days in Sammystown is the third studio album by American rock band Wall of Voodoo, released in 1985. This was the first Wall of Voodoo album to include Andy Prieboy on vocals and Ned Leukhardt on drums—following the departure of frontman Stan Ridgway and percussionist Joe Nanini—and also features the return of original bassist Bruce Moreland. It includes their cover version of Merle Travis' "Dark as a Dungeon". The track "Far Side of Crazy" is featured in the 1985 movie Head Office. The album reached No. 50 on the Australian charts.

== Reception ==
Professional ratings
Review scores
Source	Rating
AllMusic	2.5/5 stars

In a retrospective review, AllMusic's Rudyard Kennedy judged the album's biggest flaw as retaining the Wall of Voodoo name without the distinctive presences of Ridgway and Nanini. Kennedy cited "Business of Love" and "Big City" as examples of failed attempts to imitate the original band, while declaring "Far Side of Crazy", "Room with a View", "Dark as a Dungeon" and "(Don't Spill My) Courage" to all be highlights.

Spin said, "The record plays like the sound track to an Eastwood cowboy film where somebody slipped some mescaline into the cast's box lunches. This is haunting, desolate music that's like the theme from The Good, the Bad and the Ugly performed by the crazies who hang around the bus station in places like Vegas."

== Reissues ==
Seven Days in Sammystown was released on CD in 1989 by MCA Records (USA) on the IRS label and by EMI Records (Australia). In 2012, the album was remastered and re-released by Australian reissue label Raven Records as part of a double CD set with successive album Happy Planet, live album The Ugly Americans in Australia and three non album bonus tracks.

== Track listing ==
Side one

1. "Far Side of Crazy" (Andy Prieboy) – 3:55
2. "This Business of Love" (Chas T. Gray) – 4:25
3. "Faded Love" (Bob Wills, John Wills) – :40
4. "Mona" (Bruce Moreland) – 4:55
5. "Room With a View" (Prieboy) – 2:47
6. "Blackboard Sky" (Prieboy) – 4:37

Side two

1. "Big City" (Gray, Marc Moreland, B. Moreland) – 4:20
2. "Dark as a Dungeon" (Merle Travis) – 4:40
3. "Museums" (M. Moreland) – 4:21
4. "Tragic Vaudeville" (B. Moreland) – 3:25
5. "(Don't Spill My) Courage" (Gray, M. Moreland) – 4:15
- The original LP sleeve contains three errors: "This Business of Love" is listed as "Business of Love"; "Dark as a Dungeon" is listed as "Dark as the Dungeon"; and "Faded Love" is not listed at all. The correct track listing appears on the LP's label, as well as the CD and cassette, although the "Dark as the Dungeon" error can appear on some MP3 listings.

== Personnel ==
Wall of Voodoo

- Chas T. Gray – keyboards, vocal backing
- Bruce Moreland – bass, keyboards
- Andy Prieboy – vocals, keyboards
- Ned Leukhardt – drums, percussion
- Marc Moreland – guitars

Additional musician

- John Parrish – additional percussion ("Museums", "Far Side of Crazy")

Technical

- Ian Broudie – producer
- Pete Hammond – remixing ("Far Side of Crazy")
- Gil Norton – engineer
- Dave Powell – engineer
- Ray Roberts – cover painting
- Scott Lindgren – photography

== Charts ==
Chart (1985)	Peak position
Australia (Kent Music Report)	50
