= The Index Masters =

Compilation album by Wall of Voodoo
- Released: 1991
- Recorded: 1979–1980
- Venue: The Barn, University of California, Riverside
- Studio: Wilder Brothers, West Los Angeles
- Length: 56:00
- Label: Restless
- Producer: Phillip Culp, Wall of Voodoo

Wall of Voodoo chronology
The Ugly Americans in Australia (1989)	The Index Masters (1991)

Professional ratings
Review scores
Source	Rating
AllMusic	3/5 stars

The Index Masters is a compilation album by American rock band Wall of Voodoo, featuring their original 1980 EP and live recordings from 1979. Originally released in 1991 by Restless Records, it was reissued in 2005 by Rykodisc.

== Track listing ==
All songs written by Wall of Voodoo except where noted.

1. "Longarm" – 3:45
2. "The Passenger" – 4:06
3. "Can't Make Love" – 3:46
4. "Struggle" – 2:14
5. "Ring of Fire" (June Carter, Merle Kilgore) – 5:02
6. "Granma's House" – 1:21
7. "End of an Era" (live) – 4:00
8. "Tomorrow" (live) – 2:44
9. "Animal Day" (live) (Stan Ridgway) – 2:45
10. "Longarm" (live) – 3:17
11. "Invisible Man" (live) – 2:11
12. "Red Light" (live) – 3:26
13. "The Good, the Bad and the Ugly/Hang 'Em High" (live) (Ennio Morricone/Dominic Frontiere) – 2:56
14. "Back in Flesh" (live) – 3:39
15. "Call Box" (live) – 2:59
16. "The Passenger" (live) – 4:02

Notes:

- Tracks 1–6 recorded at Wilder Brothers Recording Services, West Los Angeles.
- Tracks 7–16 recorded November 22, 1979 at the Barn, University of California, Riverside. All previously unreleased, except for track 13, issued as the B-side of "Ring of Fire" in 1982 under the title "The Morricone Themes".
- Tracks 7 and 11 do not appear on any other Wall of Voodoo release.

== Personnel ==
- Stanard Ridgway – vocals, organ
- Marc Moreland – guitar
- Chas Gray – synthesizer
- Bruce Moreland – bass, piano
- Joe Nanini – percussion

Technical

- Phillip Culp – co-producer, art direction and design
- Wall of Voodoo – co-producers, cover concept
- Jim Hill – engineer, digital remastering
- Scott Lindgren – photography
- Steve Hill – digital remastering
