= The Lonesome Strangers =

American country rock band (formed 1984)

- Origin: Los Angeles, California
- Genres: Rock and Country
- Years active: 1984-1989; 1997
- Labels: Little Dogs Records; The Wrestler Label; HighTone Records
- Members: Jeff Rymes; Randy Weeks; Jeff Roberts (bassist); Greg Perry (drummer); Skip Edwards (keyboardist)
- Past members: Nino Del Pesco (former bassist); Joe Nanini (former drummer); Lorne Rall (former bassist); Mike McLean (former drummer); Dusty Wakeman (former bassist); Jim Christie (former drummer); Kenny Griffin (former drummer)

The Lonesome Strangers were an American country rock music band formed in Los Angeles in 1984. The line-up of songwriters Jeff Rymes and Randy Weeks, bassist Nino Del Pesco and drummer Joe Nanini had led the band to be "one of California's most influential bands" and helped revive country rock music. However, Pesco and Nanini left the band to pursue their own careers and were replaced by Lorne Rall as the bassist and Mike McLean as the drummer.

They primarily incorporated rock and country music in their performances where they brought a rockability instrumental approach, sweet country-style vocal harmonies and original songs. According to country music writer Jack Hurst (1989), The Lonesome Strangers' music were "a little to rock for mainstream country and a little too country for mainstream rock, [which didn't] easily fit into current radio's established format". However, Rymes states that their music falls between rock and country music depending on people's different tastes.

They had released a total of three studios albums, Lonesome Pine (1986), The Lonesome Strangers (1989) and Land of Opportunity (1997), which earned them a Top 40 Billboard Hit. They had also gained more recognition and became part of the Americana Music movement.

Rall and McLean were replaced by Dusty Wakeman and Jim Christie when their third album Land of Opportunity was released and Skip Edwards also participated into the album as a keyboardist. However, Jeff Roberts became the touring bassist, and the drummer was ex-Plowboy Kenny Griffin, then Greg Perry.

The Lonesome Strangers are currently on a hiatus after their last studio album and are doing their solo activities.

== History ==
In the early 1980s, Jeff Rymes’s friend place an ad looking “for people who play the blues with him”. Rymes used to play with the Moondogs in the San Fernando Valley while Randy Weeks was with Jumpin’ Bones. Both Jumpin’ Bones and the Moondogs disbanded and Rymes and Weeks kept running into each other as they realised that they lived on the same neighbourhood. So, they decided to respond to Rymes’s friend ad and form a new group called the Lonesome Strangers. Bassist Nino Del Pesco and former Wall of Voodoo drummer Joe Nanini later joined the band.

The Lonesome Strangers were discovered by producer Pete Anderson when they performed around the L.A. clubs. He included their song "Lonesome Pine" on the 1985 compilation A Town South of Bakersfield in which Dwight Yoakam, Rosie Flores, James Intveld, and other American artists had contributed. Anderson produced their debut album Lonesome Pine that was released under the Wrestler label and it became a successful album.

Before their debut album was released, Nanini left the band and Mike McLean became the new drummer of the band. In 1987, Del Pesco later departed from the band after their tour with Yoakam and Dave Alvin in order to form a new band called Snakefarm with Barry McBride in 1987 and he was replaced by Lorne Rall. In 1988, Weeks and Rymes performed as backing vocals to Yoakam's acclaimed studio album Buenos Noches From a Lonely Room.

The Lonesome Strangers signed under the HighTone Records in 1988 where they issued their second album in 1989 called ‘The Lonesome Strangers’. It had also received highly complimentary review along with their minor US country hits ‘Goodbye Lonesome, Hello Baby Doll’ and ‘Just Can’t Cry No More’. Despite their breakthrough in the US, the band went on a hiatus due to Rymes’s announcement about his relocation to the East Coast in the early 1990s. Weeks and Rymes then reunited after Rymes return to Los Angeles several years later and eventually created a new album Land of Opportunity in 1997. Dusty Wakeman replaced Lorne Rall as the bassist and Jim Christie became the new drummer of the band. Skip Edwards later contributed on the album as a keyboardist. However, Jeff Roberts was later hired as the touring bassist, and the drummer became ex-Plowboy Kenny Griffin, then Greg Perry. After their third album and a series of live performances, they decided to take a hiatus and pursue their solo activities.

== Albums Discography ==
=== Studio albums ===
- Lonesome Pine (1986)
- The Lonesome Strangers (1989)
- Land Of Opportunity (1997)

=== Singles ===
- Goodbye Lonesome, Hello Baby Doll (1989)
- Just Can’t Cry No More (1989)

=== Compilation ===
- A Town South of Bakersfield (1985)
- HighTone Records The First 10 Years (1994)
- Little Dog Records - Sampler 1996 (1996)
- New Country Volume 4 Number 9 (19970
- Little Dog Records 1997 Sampler (1997)
- Classic Bluegrass (From Smithsonian Folkways) (2002)
- Hightone Records Anthology - Rockin' From The Roots (2007)
