= Can't Let Go (Randy Weeks song) =

Randy Weeks song

- promotional CD single artwork

Single by Lucinda Williams

from the album Car Wheels on a Gravel Road
- Released: 1998
- Genre: Country rock, alternative country
- Length: 3:28
- Label: Mercury
- Songwriter: Randy Weeks
- Producers: Steve Earle, Ray Kennedy, Lucinda Williams

Lucinda Williams singles chronology
"Right in Time" (1998)	"Can't Let Go" (1998)	"Essence" (2001)

"Can't Let Go" is a song written by American singer-songwriter Randy Weeks, made famous by Lucinda Williams in 1998–1999. Williams released "Can't Let Go" as a single from her album Car Wheels on a Gravel Road, and the song entered the Billboard Adult Alternative Airplay chart in December 1998, peaking at number 14 in March 1999, staying on the chart for 13 weeks. Williams earned a Grammy nomination for the song in the category Best Female Rock Vocal Performance. Weeks released his own version of the song in 2000, on his album Madeline.

In 2021, English singer Robert Plant and American singer/fiddler Alison Krauss covered the song on their album Raise the Roof. "Can't Let Go" was released as the lead single from the album, peaking at number 8 on the Adult Alternative Airplay chart.

== Lucinda Williams version ==
Lucinda Williams heard the song performed by Randy Weeks, and asked him if she could work it into her own style. She included the song on her acclaimed album Car Wheels on a Gravel Road, and released it as a single in late 1998. As it was rising in the Alternative Airplay chart, she performed the song on Saturday Night Live on February 20, 1999. Steve Earle and Ray Kennedy produced the song under the name Twangtrust, with Williams receiving co-producer credit. Roy Bittan performed additional engineering, including overdubbing, adding extra sounds.

Country music website The Boot listed the song as number 2 of the best Lucinda Williams songs, underneath the 1989 hit "Passionate Kisses". The Boot described Williams's version of "Can't Let Go" as "a Texas roadhouse barn-burner, with charred licks and vocals that convey equal parts anguish and defiance." The lyrics document "the bittersweet experience of hanging onto a failed (or failing) romance". Holler listed the song at number 6 on their list of Williams' best songs, describing it as a "freight train of a track" that "set the standard for her rowdy, radical records," writing "The stop-and-go production structure evokes the almost rhythmic rough-and-tumble of the relationship with slick lyricism."

== Randy Weeks composition ==
Randy Weeks wrote the song and performed it at the Palomino Club in Los Angeles, where Williams first heard it. Weeks remembers, "she came up to me and said: 'I like that song. What is it?' About three years later, after 'Passionate Kisses,' she asked if I could send her a tape of it." Weeks said Williams held onto the song for three more years before putting it on her 1998 album Car Wheels on a Gravel Road. Williams said, "I love Randy.... I'm so glad he's finally getting his just due. I've championed his music for years and years. We knew each other from his Lonesome Strangers days. I opened for those guys when I first moved to California. My boyfriend then, Lorne Rall, played in the band with Randy, so we go way back." "Can't Let Go" was the only cover song on Car Wheels on a Gravel Road – all the other songs were written or co-written by Williams. "Can't Let Go" was the most successful single from the album.

After Williams made the song famous, Weeks included his own version of it on his 2000 album Madeline, with backing vocals by Manny Gonzalez.

== Robert Plant and Alison Krauss version ==
"Can't Let Go"

Single by Robert Plant and Alison Krauss

from the album Raise the Roof
- Released: August 12, 2021
- Length: 3:41
- Label: Rounder, Concord
- Songwriter: Randy Weeks
- Producer: T Bone Burnett

In November 2021, English rock singer Robert Plant (ex–Led Zeppelin) and American bluegrass violinist/vocalist Alison Krauss released their second collaborative album, Raise the Roof. The album was preceded by "Can't Let Go" released as the lead single on August 12. It climbed the Adult Alternative Airplay chart during September, peaking at number 8 in October. By December 1, the single had amassed 327,000 U.S. streams, 262,000 radio audience impressions and 2,500 downloads sold, entering the Hot Rock & Alternative Songs chart at number 39 for one week.

The Plant–Krauss version was produced by T Bone Burnett, who previously produced the duo's award-winning album Raising Sand (2007). Reviewing "Can't Let Go", NPR praised the harmonies of Plant and Krauss, and called out the "shuffling grooves of drummer Jay Bellerose." Stereogum described the song as "an eminently likable bluesy shuffle built around a guitar part that will burrow its way into your brain." Plant and Krauss performed the song live on The Late Show With Stephen Colbert in November 2021, and on The Kelly Clarkson Show in December.
