= The Tipping Point (Authority Zero album) =

Studio album by Authority Zero
- Released: April 02, 2013
- Genre: Punk rock, pop punk, melodic hardcore, reggae
- Length: 42:57
- Label: Hardline Entertainment
- Producer: Cameron Webb

Authority Zero chronology
| Stories of Survival (2010) | The Tipping Point (2013) | Broadcasting to the Nations (2017) |

The Tipping Point is the fifth full-length studio album released by American punk band Authority Zero. It was released on April 2, 2013, through the Hardline Entertainment, a record label owned by Pennywise guitarist Fletcher Dragge. It is the first studio album from the band to feature Brandon Landelius and Sean Sellers on guitar and drums, respectively. It is also the final album to feature Jeremey Wood on bass, for he left the band a month prior to the album's release. The Tipping Point peaked at number 15 on Billboard's Top Heatseekers chart.

According to the band, the album is a "taste of the old school and slingshots into new areas and veins of music we have yet to tap into as well as some surprises."

Music videos were made for the songs, "Today We Heard the News", "No Other Place" and "Lift One Up".

Professional ratings
Review scores
| Source | Rating |
|---|---|
| Alternative Press | 3.5/5 stars |

== Track listing ==
1. "No Other Place" – 2:57
2. "Undivided" – 3:18
3. "For the Kids" – 4:04
4. "Take or Leave It" – 3:14
5. "Struggle" – 4:46
6. "Lift One Up" – 3:47
7. "On the Brink" – 3:20
8. "Today We Heard the News" – 4:35
9. "The Tipping Point" – 3:24
10. "Shakedown in Juarez" – 3:34
11. "Endless Roads" – 3:02
12. "21st Century Breakout" – 2:56

== Personnel ==
Authority Zero

- Jason DeVore – vocals
- Brandon Landlius – guitars
- Jeremy Wood – bass
- Sean Sellers – drums

Production and recording

- Cameron Webb – producer and mixing
- Jason Livermore – mastering
- Ken Seaton – management
