= Chase Long Beach =

US musical group

- Also known as: CLB
- Origin: Los Angeles, California
- Genres: Ska punk
- Years active: 2002–2012, 2022-present
- Label: Victory
- Members: Karen Roberts; Meagan Dolce; Tristan Dolce; Patrick Clancy; Andrew Pedersen; Jose Rodriguez; Joseph Cooper
- Past members: Ryan Sandoval; Patrick Fitzgerald; Alana Mireles; Ryan Humphrey; James Russel Finch III; Russell Feldt; Dustin Feldt

Chase Long Beach is an American ska punk band from Long Beach, California, that formed in 2002 by lead vocalist Karen Roberts and former bassist/vocalist Patrick Fitzgerald. In 2007, they released their first full-length album, LeBeC, produced by Aaron Barrett of Reel Big Fish. In 2009, Chase Long Beach signed to Victory Records, managed by Hardline Entertainment and released their second album, Gravity is What You Make It, on June 23, 2009. In 2022 Chase Long Beach returned for a reunion show and in 2023 released the song, "Mammoth", stating that the band would be releasing more new music in the coming year.

In 2024, Chase Long Beach released the first two singles, "Repo Jake" and "Secrets Of Summer", from an upcoming record to be titled, Rico's Cocktail Club.

== Discography ==
=== Albums ===
- LeBeC (2007)
- Gravity is What You Make It (2009)

=== EPs ===
- Invasion of the Fuzzy Things (2004)
- Chase Long Beach Hosts a Molotov Cocktail Party (2006)
- Rico's Cocktail Club (2024)

=== Singles ===
- "Mammoth" (2023)
- "Repo Jake" (2024)
- "Secrets of Summer" (2024)

== Members ==
=== Lineup ===
- Karen Roberts - Lead vocals (2002 - 2009), (2022 - present)
- Meagan Christy - Trumpet, Vocals (2005 - 2012), (2022 - present)
- Joe Cooper - Lead guitar (2007 - 2012), (2022 - present)
- Tristan Dolce - Trumpet (2005 - 2012), (2022 - present)
- Drew Pedersen - Trombone (2006 - 2012), (2022 - present)
- Jose Rodriguez - Drums (2003–2004, 2008 - 2012), (2022 - present)
- Patrick Clancy - Bass (2010 - 2012), (2022 - present)
