= Lionize =

American rock band

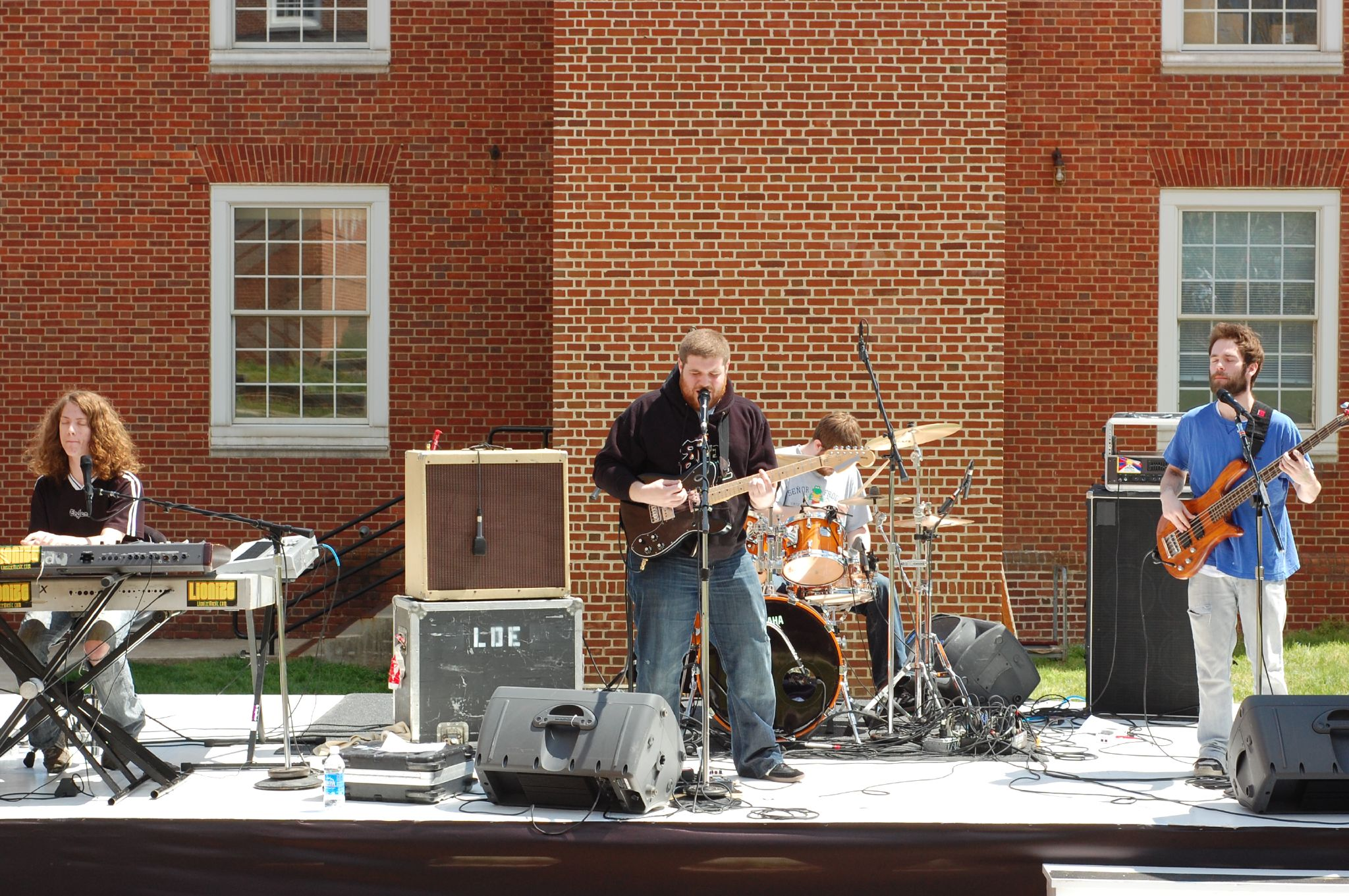
- Lionize performing live in 2007

Background information
- Origin: Silver Spring, Maryland, U.S.
- Genres: Hard rock, stoner metal, reggae rock, dub, funk metal, alternative metal
- Years active: 2004–present
- Labels: Electric Reckoning, Weathermaker, Indication, Hardline, Pentimento, Wheaton's Finest
- Members: Chris Brooks; Henry Upton; Nathan Bergman
- Past members: Chase Lapp; LaMel Randolph

Lionize is an American rock band, formed in 2004 and based in Montgomery County, Maryland. Their sound has been described as a reggae rock with elements of hard rock, jazz, heavy metal, and punk. One reviewer described the band as "kind of like if the guys in Deep Purple were Rastafarians wrapped in trippy sci-fi imagery."

The band consists of singer/guitarist Nate Bergman, keyboardist Chris Brooks, and bassist Henry Upton. LaMel Randolph and Chase Lapp have served as drummers for the band. They have long been connected with fellow Maryland band Clutch, and that band's guitarist Tim Sult is a frequent collaborator on stage and in the studio.

== History ==
The band members originally met in middle school and officially formed Lionize in the summer of 2004. Their debut album Danger My Dear was released in 2005. Later that year, the band opened for Steel Pulse, initiating a longtime friendship that culminated in Lionize traveling to Jamaica to record their second album Space Pope and the Glass Machine, released in 2008. Also in 2008 the band opened for H.R. and The Human Rights band, which led to several later opening stints for H.R.'s band Bad Brains.

In 2009–2010, the band was handpicked by Lee "Scratch" Perry to tour the United States as Perry's own backing band and support act. This led to group performing at several festivals, including Reggae on the Rocks at Red Rocks Amphitheatre in Colorado. In 2011, Lionize was the first band to ever perform at Bonnaroo Music Festival and the Vans Warped Tour in the same summer.

Lionize released the album Destruction Manual in 2011, followed by Superczar and the Vulture the following year. Jetpack Soundtrack followed in 2014. The album Nuclear Soul was released in 2017. During this period, the band attracted notice for Brooks's classic rock-oriented keyboard playing and Bergman's vocal influences ranging from Sam Cooke to Joe Cocker.

The band's most recent album Panic Attack! was released in 2019, featuring a guest appearance by Clutch drummer Jean-Paul Gaster. In the 2020s Bergman embarked on a solo career exploring country, soul, and blues, and released the album Metaphysical Change in 2022.

== Discography ==
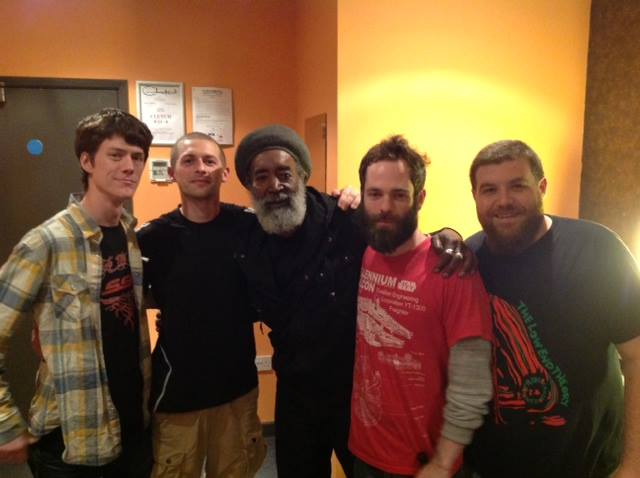
Lionize with Steve Nisbett of Steel Pulse (center)

- Danger My Dear (2005)
- Mummies Wrapped in Money (EP, 2006)
- Space Pope and the Glass Machine (2008)
- Destruction Manual (2011)
- Superczar and the Vulture (2012)
- Jetpack Soundtrack (2014)
- "Run John Barleycorn Run" (split single with Clutch for Record Store Day, 2014)
- Alpha (EP, 2015)
- The Voyage (EP, 2016)
- Nuclear Soul (2017)
- Cyber Attackers (EP, 2018)
- Panic Attack! (2019)
