= Call of the West =

Studio album by Wall of Voodoo
- Released: September 1982
- Recorded: June 1982
- Studios: Hit City, Los Angeles
- Genre: Post-punk
- Labels: I.R.S. (USA); Illegal (UK)
- Producer: Richard Mazda

Wall of Voodoo chronology
Dark Continent (1981)	Call of the West (1982)	Seven Days in Sammystown (1985)

Call of the West is the second studio album by American rock band Wall of Voodoo, released in September 1982. The album contains "Mexican Radio", the group's most well-known song, which was released as a single and whose video received moderate airplay on MTV.

It was the final Wall of Voodoo album to feature drummer Joe Nanini and frontman Stan Ridgway, who both departed the group along with subsequently-added keyboardist Bill Noland the following year.

== Critical reception ==
Professional ratings
Review scores
Source	Rating
AllMusic	4.5/5 stars
Classic Rock	4/10 stars
The Village Voice	B

In a 1982 Trouser Press review, Jon Young said, "[t]hey're dealing in pure hokum, for sure, but Wall of Voodoo has become very good at it. Atmosphere is all in these muttered tales of desperation and weirdness, suggesting Devo on a bad trip of no return. But Call of the West doesn't repel; it's spooky halloweenish fun."

== Track listing ==
All music composed by Wall of Voodoo. All lyrics composed by Stan Ridgway.

Side one

1. "Tomorrow" – 3:03
2. "Lost Weekend" – 4:59
3. "Factory" – 5:33
4. "Look at Their Way" – 3:18
5. "Hands of Love" – 3:54

Side two

1. "Mexican Radio" – 4:11
2. "Spy World" – 2:41
3. "They Don't Want Me" – 4:31
4. "On Interstate 15" – 2:44
5. "Call of the West" – 5:59
- The original cassette release of the album features a bonus track called "Exercise" at the end of side one, following "Hands of Love".
- In 2009, Australian label Raven Records reissued Call of the West and the first Wall of Voodoo album, Dark Continent, together on one CD, featuring a full color booklet with liner notes by Ian McFarlane. Both albums were digitally remastered.

== Personnel ==
Wall of Voodoo

- Joe Nanini – percussion, drums, voice
- Stanard Ridgway – vocals, words, harmonica, keyboards
- Chas T. Gray – synthesizer, bass, backing vocals
- Marc Moreland – 6- and 12-string guitars

Additional musicians

- Louie Rivera – percussion
- Richard Mazda – rhythm machine programming, bass guitars

Technical

- Richard Mazda – producer
- Jess Sutcliffe – engineer, mixing
- Robert Battaglia – mixing
- Avi Kipper – mixing
- Frank De Luna – mastering
- Stanard Ridgway – cover concept, design
- Scott Lindgren – cover concept
- Francis Delia – design, photography
- Paul Peterson – production design
- Stephen Sayadian, Genny Schorr – styling
- Carl Grasso – art direction, layout
- Marc Moreland – printing

== Charts ==
Album

Year	Chart	Position
1983	Billboard Pop Albums	45

Singles

Year	Chart	Single	Position
1983	Billboard Mainstream Rock	"Mexican Radio"	41
1983	Billboard Pop Singles	"Mexican Radio"	58
