= 12:34 =

Studio album by Authority Zero
- Released: January 30, 2007
- Recorded: 2006
- Genre: Punk rock, pop punk, ska punk, reggae
- Length: 41:28
- Label: Big Panda Records
- Producer: Ryan Greene

Authority Zero chronology
Rhythm and Booze (2005)	12:34 (2007)	Stories of Survival (2010)

12:34 is the third album released by punk band Authority Zero. It was released on January 30, 2007 on Big Panda Records. Music Videos were made for the songs "The Bravery" and "No Regrets".

== Reception ==
PUNKnews.org reported that the album was "a step up from Andiamo, and on par with A Passage in Time. Authority Zero has delivered a solid, standout album once again".

Professional ratings
Review scores
Source	Rating
Allmusic	3.5/5 stars
ReadJunk	4.5/5 stars

== Track listing ==
No.	Title	Length
1.	"Wake Up Call"	3:20
2.	"On Edge"	2:47
3.	"Courage"	3:32
4.	"No Regrets"	2:45
5.	"Talk is Cheap"	3:49
6.	"The Bravery"	3:28
7.	"Carpe Diem"	2:37
8.	"Sirens"	3:04
9.	"12:34"	3:01
10.	"Memory Lane"	2:53
11.	"Drunken Sailor"	2:38
12.	"Broken Dreams"	2:46
13.	"Break Free"	4:48
