= Far Side of Crazy =

Single by Wall of Voodoo

from the album Seven Days in Sammystown
- B-side: "Wrong Way to Hollywood / Dance You Fuckers"
- Released: 1985
- Recorded: 1984
- Length: 3:55 (album version)
- Label: IRS
- Songwriter: Andy Prieboy
- Producer: Ian Broudie

Wall of Voodoo singles chronology
"Big City" (1984)	"Far Side of Crazy" (1985)	"Do It Again" (1987)

Music video
- "Far Side of Crazy" on YouTube

"Far Side of Crazy" is a song by the American rock band Wall of Voodoo from their album Seven Days in Sammystown. It was released as the album's lead single in late 1985, with an accompanying music video combining black and white and full color footage.

The lyrics refer to the attempted assassination of U.S. President Ronald Reagan by John Hinckley Jr. in 1981. The title comes from his poems; "I remain the far side of crazy". Hinckley was obsessing over actress Jodie Foster and believed that the only way to attract her attention was to become famous himself. He was inspired by the murder of John Lennon and the subsequent media attention that his killer, Mark David Chapman, received as a result. The song picks a number of lines from the letters that Hinckley sent to Foster both before and after the assassination.

The single failed to chart in all territories except Australia, where it reached No. 23 in June 1986 and stayed in the top 100 for 21 weeks.

== Reception ==
Spin said the song, "rolls in innocently enough with the twangy, giddy-up guitar of Marc Moreland. Then a thundering bass beat from Bruce Moreland stomps in and Prieboy starts ranting like John Hinckley-as-Marlboro Man. He sets the mood as he takes the role of the psychopathic poet with a crush on a celebrity."

== Track listings ==
=== 7": I.R.S. Records / A 6846 (Europe) ===
1. "Far Side Of Crazy" (A. Prieboy) – 4:07
2. "Wrong Way To Hollywood" (M. Moreland, A. Prieboy) – 4:21

=== 7": Illegal Records / ES 1098 (Australia) ===
1. "Far Side Of Crazy" (A. Prieboy) – 4:07
2. "This Business Of Love" (C. Gray) – 4:25

=== 12": I.R.S. Records / IRMT 111 (UK) ===
1. "Far Side Of Crazy" (A. Prieboy) – 4:07
2. "Wrong Way To Hollywood" (M. Moreland, A. Prieboy) – 4:21
3. "Dance You Fuckers" (C. Gray) – 6:10

== Charts ==
Chart (1986)	Peak position
Australia (Kent Music Report)	23
