= Raise the Roof (album) =

Studio album by Robert Plant and Alison Krauss
- Released: November 19, 2021
- Recorded: 2021
- Genre: Americana
- Length: 53:32
- Labels: Rounder; Concord
- Producer: T Bone Burnett

Robert Plant and Alison Krauss chronology
| Raising Sand (2007) | Raise the Roof (2021) |

Robert Plant chronology
| Carry Fire (2017) | Raise the Roof (2021) | Saving Grace (2025) |

Alison Krauss chronology
| Windy City (2017) | Raise the Roof (2021) | Arcadia (2025) |

Singles from Raise the Roof
- 1. "Can't Let Go" Released: August 12, 2021; 2. "High and Lonesome" Released: October 7, 2021; 3. "It Don't Bother Me" Released: November 4, 2021; 4. "Somebody Was Watching Over Me" Released: November 18, 2021

Raise the Roof is the second collaborative studio album by English singer-songwriter Robert Plant and American bluegrass-country singer and violinist Alison Krauss. The album was released on November 19, 2021, by Rounder Records and Concord Records in the United States and Warner Music for the rest of the world. The album was nominated for three Grammy Awards at the 65th Annual Grammy Awards, including Best Americana Album, Best American Roots Song for "High and Lonesome," and Best Country Duo/Group Performance for "Going Where the Lonely Go".

== Critical reception ==
Professional ratings
Aggregate scores
| Source | Rating |
|---|---|
| Metacritic | 83/100 |
Review scores
| Source | Rating |
| Allmusic | 4/5 stars |
| American Songwriter | 4/5 stars |
| Classic Rock | 4/5 stars |
| The Observer | 4/5 stars |
| Pitchfork | 7.3/10 |
| Paste | 8.0/10 |
| PopMatters | 7/10 |
| Slant Magazine | 4/5 stars |

Raise the Roof received critical acclaim from music critics. At Metacritic, which assigns a normalized rating out of 100 to reviews from critics, the album received an average score of 83, which indicates "universal acclaim", based on 14 reviews.

== Track listing ==
| No. | Title | Writer(s) | Length |
|---|---|---|---|
| 1. | "Quattro (World Drifts In)" | Joey Burns, John Convertino | 4:33 |
| 2. | "The Price of Love" | Don Everly, Phil Everly | 4:50 |
| 3. | "Go Your Way" | Anne Briggs | 5:07 |
| 4. | "Trouble with My Lover" | Allen Toussaint | 4:03 |
| 5. | "Searching for My Love" | Bobby Moore | 4:03 |
| 6. | "Can't Let Go" | Randy Weeks | 3:41 |
| 7. | "It Don't Bother Me" | Bert Jansch | 5:06 |
| 8. | "You Led Me to the Wrong" | Ola Belle Reed | 4:17 |
| 9. | "Last Kind Words Blues" | Geeshie Wiley | 4:06 |
| 10. | "High and Lonesome" | Robert Plant, T Bone Burnett | 4:33 |
| 11. | "Going Where the Lonely Go" | Merle Haggard, Dean Holloway | 4:10 |
| 12. | "Somebody Was Watching Over Me" | Brenda Burns | 5:02 |
| Total length: | | | 53:32 |

Target and European deluxe edition bonus tracks
| No. | Title | Writer(s) | Length |
|---|---|---|---|
| 13. | "My Heart Would Know" | Hank Williams | 2:58 |
| 14. | "You Can't Rule Me" | Lucinda Williams, Tom Overby | 4:44 |

== Personnel ==
- Alison Krauss – vocals, fiddle
- Robert Plant – vocals

=== Additional musicians ===
- Bill Frisell – acoustic guitar, electric guitar
- David Hidalgo – acoustic guitar, electric guitar, jarana
- Marc Ribot – acoustic guitar, banjo, dobro, electric guitar, bass guitar
- Colin Linden – dobro
- Buddy Miller – electric mandolin, guitar
- Russ Pahl – pedal steel guitar, guitar, bass guitar
- Stuart Duncan – banjo, cello, fiddle, mandolin
- T Bone Burnett – six-string bass, composer, acoustic and electric guitars, Mellotron, producer, vocal harmony, backing vocals
- Dennis Crouch – upright bass
- Viktor Krauss – upright bass, Mellotron
- Jeff Taylor – bass accordion, dolceola, Marxophone, piano
- Lucinda Williams – background vocals
- Jay Bellerose – drums, percussion

=== Production ===
- T Bone Burnett – Production
- Michael Piersante – Recording and Mixing
- Richard Evans – Design & Art

== Charts ==
=== Weekly charts ===
Chart performance for Raise the Roof
| Chart (2021) | Peak position |
|---|---|
| Australian Albums (ARIA) | 18 |
| Austrian Albums (Ö3 Austria) | 11 |
| Belgian Albums (Ultratop Flanders) | 14 |
| Belgian Albums (Ultratop Wallonia) | 23 |
| Canadian Albums (Billboard) | 16 |
| Czech Albums (ČNS IFPI) | 21 |
| Danish Albums (Hitlisten) | 8 |
| Dutch Albums (Album Top 100) | 15 |
| Finnish Albums (Suomen virallinen lista) | 9 |
| French Albums (SNEP) | 51 |
| Hungarian Albums (MAHASZ) | 5 |
| German Albums (Offizielle Top 100) | 14 |
| Irish Albums (Official Charts) | 6 |
| Italian Albums (FIMI) | 54 |
| New Zealand Albums (RMNZ) | 7 |
| Norwegian Albums (VG-lista) | 3 |
| Polish Albums (ZPAV) | 25 |
| Portuguese Albums (AFP) | 27 |
| Scottish Albums (Official Charts) | 4 |
| Spanish Albums (Promusicae) | 45 |
| Swedish Albums (Sverigetopplistan) | 9 |
| Swiss Albums (Schweizer Hitparade) | 7 |
| UK Albums (Official Charts) | 5 |
| US Billboard 200 | 7 |
| US Independent Albums (Billboard) | 1 |
| US Top Country Albums (Billboard) | 3 |

=== Year-end charts ===
2021 year-end chart performance for Raise the Roof
| Chart (2021) | Position |
|---|---|
| Hungarian Albums (MAHASZ) | 98 |
| Swiss Albums (Schweizer Hitparade) | 84 |

2022 year-end chart performance for Raise the Roof
| Chart (2022) | Position |
|---|---|
| US Top Country Albums (Billboard) | 54 |

== Certifications and sales ==
| Region | Certification | Certified units/sales |
|---|---|---|
| United Kingdom (BPI) | Silver | 60,000^{‡} |
^{‡} Sales+streaming figures based on certification alone.
