= Stories of Survival =

Studio album by Authority Zero
- Released: June 22, 2010
- Recorded: 2009–10 at Area 52 Entertainment
- Genre: Punk rock, pop punk, ska punk, reggae
- Length: 41:51
- Label: Suburban Noize; Viking Funeral
- Producer: Ryan Greene

Authority Zero chronology
12:34 (2007)	Stories of Survival (2010)	The Tipping Point (2013)

Singles from Stories of Survival
- 1. "Get It Right" Released: June 8, 2010; 2. "Big Bad World" Released: May 24, 2011

Professional ratings
Review scores
Source	Rating
AbsolutePunk	73%
AllMusic	3.5/5 stars

Stories Of Survival is the fourth studio album released by American punk band Authority Zero. It was released on June 22, 2010, through the Suburban Noize Records subsidiary, Viking Funeral Records. Stories Of Survival peaked at number 5 on Billboard's Top Heatseekers chart, and at number 43 on Billboard's Independent Albums chart.

Music Videos were made for the songs, "Get it Right" and "Big Bad World".

== Track listing ==
1. "Intro" – 0:18
2. "The New Pollution" – 3:03
3. "A Day to Remember" – 3:51
4. "Brick in the Wave" – 4:01
5. "Get It Right" – 3:16
6. "Big Bad World" – 4:55
7. "Break the Mold" – 2:55
8. "Crashland" – 5:25
9. "Liberateducation" – 3:48
10. "Movement" – 4:10
11. "The Remedy" – 3:06
12. "No Way Home" – 3:03

== Personnel ==
Authority Zero

- Jason DeVore – vocals
- Zach Vogel – guitars
- Jim Wilcox – drums
- Jeremy Wood – bass

Production and recording

- Jake Dennis – assistant
- Ryan Greene – production, engineering, mixing
- Stephen Marsh – mastering
- Ken Seaton – management
