= Wall of Voodoo (EP) =

EP by Wall of Voodoo
- Released: 1980
- Recorded: 1980
- Genre: Post-punk
- Length: 19:46
- Label: Index, Restless

Wall of Voodoo chronology
Wall of Voodoo (1980)	Dark Continent (1981)

Professional ratings
Review scores
Source	Rating
Allmusic	3/5 stars

Wall of Voodoo is the debut EP and release by American rock band Wall of Voodoo, issued in 1980 by Index Records. It contains a cover of Johnny Cash's "Ring of Fire". The second half of the song features a guitar solo that quotes the theme to the 1966 film Our Man Flint.

In 1991, Restless Records issued the EP on CD for the first time, with the addition of live bonus tracks, under the title The Index Masters.

== Track listing ==
Side one

1. "Longarm" – 3:44
2. "The Passenger" – 4:07

Side two

1. "Can't Make Love" – 3:47
2. "Struggle" – 2:14
3. "Ring of Fire" – 4:59
4. "Granma's House" – 0:55
