= A Passage in Time (Authority Zero album) =

Studio album by Authority Zero
- Released: September 10, 2002
- Studios: El Dorado Recording Studios, Hollywood, CA
- Genres: Ska punk, surf rock, reggae
- Length: 42:51
- Label: Lava/Atlantic
- Producer: Dave Jerden

Authority Zero chronology
A Passage in Time (2002)	Andiamo (2004)

Singles from A Passage in Time
- 1. "One More Minute" Released: September 3, 2002; 2. "Over Seasons" Released: April 28, 2003

Professional ratings
Review scores
Source	Rating
AllMusic	3/5 stars
Fazed	3/5 stars

A Passage in Time is the debut studio album released by punk rock band Authority Zero. It was released on September 10, 2002, on Lava Records. The album's singles include "One More Minute" and "Over Seasons", both of which received music videos.

== Track listing ==
No.	Title	Length
1.	"Intro: "Papa""	0:21
2.	"A Passage in Time"	3:57
3.	"Lying Awake"	3:35
4.	"Everyday"	2:25
5.	"One More Minute"	6:29
6.	"Superbitch"	3:54
7.	"Sky's the Limit"	4:57
8.	"Some People"	4:01
9.	"Mesa Town"	2:00
10.	"La Surf"	1:33
11.	"Over Seasons"	3:52
12.	"Good Ol' Days"	3:41
13.	"Not You"	2:06

== Personnel ==
Authority Zero

- Jason DeVore – lead vocals
- Bill Marcks – guitars, backing vocals
- Jeremy Wood – bass, backing vocals
- Jim Wilcox – drums
- Jerry Douglas – guest vocals on "Mesa Town" & "Good Ol' Days"

Production and recording

- Dave Jerden – production, mixing
- Annette Cisnero – engineering
- Elan Trujillo – assistant engineering
- Brad Patrick – management
- Randy Buzzelli - management

Street Promotions

- Dave Leon - Level 1 Promotions
- Jawahar Mohanty - Level 1 Promotions
