= Bruce Moreland =

American musician (born 1959)

Bruce "Ravens" Moreland (born January 22, 1959) is an American rock musician and songwriter. He has worked with such bands as Wall of Voodoo (with his brother Marc Moreland), The Weirdos, Nervous Gender, and Concrete Blonde among others. As of 2011, his current project is known as Ravens Moreland.

== Life and career ==
=== Early life ===
Bruce Moreland and his brother Marc grew up in the 1960s in West Covina, a suburb in the San Gabriel Valley region of Southern California. In their early teens, the brothers copied Alice Cooper and Iggy Pop and wore spiked hair and clothes that looked like dresses and started playing music. While attending West Covina High School, they started the "space glitter" rock band, Capt. Cosmos de Venus & The Sky People. Sky People also featured Randy Jones (singer) of Stormer and London, and Audie Desbrow, future drummer of Great White.

The Moreland brothers left the San Gabriel Valley in the late 1970s and slept in a broken down van on Gower and Selma Street in Hollywood, jamming with bands like The Dogs and Arthur "Killer" Kane, until Bruce settled in at upstart LA underground punk club The Masque with Brendan Mullen. Bruce became known as "Bruce Barf" and would MC the club's punk nights, introducing early shows of the Germs, The Go-Go's, The Dickies, The Skulls, The Weirdos (who Bruce joined on bass in 1977), and many other influential Los Angeles punk bands. During Bruce's one-year tenure with The Weirdos, they recorded such songs as "I'm Not Like You" and "Teenage". Bruce also did shows with his brother Marc with The Skulls, as well as The Controllers.

=== Wall of Voodoo ===
In late 1977, Bruce and Marc became founding members of the iconic post punk group Wall of Voodoo, who played their first show in 1978, opening for The Cramps at the Save The Masque benefit show in Los Angeles. Bruce would venture in and out of Wall of Voodoo, recording on four of their six albums; he cites chemical dependencies, emotional instability and hospital stays for the periods he missed during that time. In May 1995, some of Bruce's experiences with heroin and methadone were chronicled in an article published in Hustler magazine entitled "Turning Junkies Into Junkies: America's Methadone Treatment Program" by Scott Schalin.

In 1986, Moreland started several other music projects, including the rock band Black Cherry with Paul Black of L.A. Guns. He also merged fellow Wall of Voodoo members Marc Moreland, Chas Grey and Ned Leukhardt into the avant-garde noise group Nervous Gender, and performed with them for several years. He teamed up with longtime friend Johnette Napolitano to write the song "The Sky is a Poisonous Garden" for Bloodletting (Concrete Blonde album). Moreland spent several years after this period getting help for substance abuse, and helping others to do the same.

=== Ravens Moreland ===
Following his brother's death, Moreland focused on songwriting and producing the recordings of his own band Ravens Moreland; "Ravens" was to be his new nickname. After primarily playing bass and keyboards throughout his musical career, he switched to lead vocals and guitar in live performance while still playing bass and keyboards on many of the recordings. David Bianco, former producer of albums by Danzig, Ozzy Osbourne and The Damned, shares production credits on the first two Ravens Moreland albums Lock up Your Mothers and Sin Has a Soundtrack. Moreland self-produced their third album, Candy Bad and Pretty Things. An album released in the summer of 2011, The Dirt on You, was produced only on 12" vinyl. Ravens Moreland produced 3 more albums between 2015 and 2020, "Occupy The Earth" 2015,"Six" 2018 (digital only) and "The Death of the Guardians of the State" 2020. Ravens Moreland has featured drummers Brian Head, Jared Shavelson, Jarrod Alexander. and currently Linda LeSabre formerly of Death Ride 69 and My Life with the Thrill Kill Kult. The band has also featured Chas Stopnik and mainstay Tara Belle on Bass.

== Discography ==
=== Ravens Moreland ===
- Lock Up Your Mothers (Raven Records) 2007
- Sin Has a Soundtrack (Raven Records) 2008
- Candy Bad and Pretty Things (Raven Records) 2009
- The Dirt On You (Raven Records) 2011
- Candy Bad and Pretty Things (Ravens Records) 2013
- Occupy The Earth (Ravens Records) 2015
- Six (Ravens Records) 2018
- The Death of the Guardians of the State (Ravens Records) 2020

=== Wall of Voodoo ===
- Wall of Voodoo (Index Records LTD.) 1980
- Dark Continent (I.R.S. Records) 1981
- Big City (I.R.S. Records) 1984
- Granma's House (I.R.S. Records) 1984
- Seven Days in Sammystown (I.R.S. Records) 1985
- Happy Planet (I.R.S.) 1987
- The Index Masters (Restless Records) 1991

=== Others ===
- Addie Brik – Wattsland (Itza Records) 1984 (producer)
- Weird Science – Music From The Motion Picture Soundtrack (MCA Soundtracks) 1985
- Concrete Blonde – Bloodletting (I.R.S. Records) 1990
- Weirdos – Weird World – Volume One 1977–1981 (Frontier Records) 1991
- The Skulls – Live From The Masque 1978, Volume One (Flipside Records) 1994
