= Hardline Entertainment =

American independent record label

- Founded: 1999
- Distributors: Ingrooves/Fontana, Membran/Orchard
- Genre: Folk, Metal, Pop, Punk, Rap, Reggae, Rock, Singer/Songwriter
- Country of origin: United States
- Official website: www.hardlineent.com

Hardline Entertainment is an American independent record label, created and owned by Ken Seaton. The label began as a management firm before evolving into a stand-alone record label/management firm. Hardline is based in Hermosa Beach, California, United States, and features bands in the alternative music scene, with genres including folk, metal, pop, punk, rap, reggae, rock, and singer/songwriter.

== Current/Former Artists ==
- 1208
- Architects
- Authority Zero
- AllurA
- Between Kings
- Blacklisted Me
- Blacklist Royals
- Black President
- The Bunny Gang
- Chaos Delivery Machine
- Chase Long Beach
- Cigar
- The Darlings
- Deviates
- Diego's Umbrella
- Death By Stereo
- Hey Smith
- Hoist The Colors
- HR of Bad Brains
- Lionize
- Long Beach Dub Allstars
- Love Equals Death
- The Manic Low
- Matthew Sikora
- Mercy Music
- Musket
- Nations Afire
- Neo Geo
- Orange
- Pennywise
- Phathom
- Redfield
- Save Ferris
- Strung Out
- Templeton Pek
- The Sparring
- Wailing Souls
- Thousand Watt Stare
- TSOL
- Versus the World
- Yotam Ben Horin

== Associated Links ==
Easyreadernews.com
