= Mexican Radio =

Single by Wall of Voodoo

from the album Call of the West
- B-side: "Call of the West"
- Released: September 1982
- Recorded: June 1982
- Studio: Hit City West (Los Angeles)
- Genre: New wave
- Length: 4:08 (album version); 3:55 (single/music video edit)
- Label: I.R.S.
- Songwriter: Wall of Voodoo
- Producer: Richard Mazda

Audio sample
- "Wall of Voodoo — Mexican Radio": file; help

Music video
- "Mexican Radio" on YouTube

"Mexican Radio" is a song by American rock band Wall of Voodoo. The track was initially released on their second studio album Call of the West (1982).

The video for the single was regularly featured on MTV in the United States, contributing to the song's popularity. In April 1983 the song peaked at No. 58 on the US Billboard Hot 100 chart and No. 55 on the US Cash Box Top 100. It also reached No. 18 in Canada, No. 21 in New Zealand, No. 33 in Australia and No. 64 in the UK.

== Composition ==
The song's lyrics describe listening to the broadcasts of high-wattage unregulated Mexican radio stations, known as border blasters, whose AM broadcasts are strong enough to be picked up by radio receivers in the US. The song was inspired by car trips taken by Wall of Voodoo frontman Stan Ridgway and guitarist Marc Moreland on their way to rehearsals, when they would listen to Mexican broadcasts, preferring their programming to mainstream Los Angeles radio. During one of the band's sessions, Moreland played them a demo tape that he had recorded of himself repeatedly singing the line "I'm on a Mexican radio" over a guitar riff and that sound clip became the starting point of the single.

== Writing and recording ==
The lyrics for "Mexican Radio" were written by Ridgway and Moreland; the music was written by Moreland.

Producer Richard Mazda and recording engineer Jess Sutcliffe, both from England, were invited to Los Angeles to record with Wall of Voodoo by Miles Copeland, founder of I.R.S. Records. The songs "Mexican Radio" and "Suburban Lawns", from Wall of Voodoo's album Call of the West, were recorded with Mazda and Sutcliffe over the course of a weekend at Hit City West studios in Los Angeles.

In order to emulate the sounds of AM radio, many of the song's instruments, including the synthesizers, were played through amplifiers, rather than being recorded directly through the microphones to the mixing console. They recorded some of Moreland's guitar through an amplifier placed in the restroom at the back of the studio and Ridgway sang some of the vocals through a handmade bullhorn. The song also includes soundbites recorded by Ridgway during a trip to Mexico, including the broadcast of a dog race that was playing over a radio in a bar that he visited.

The song was recorded using a Soundcraft mixing console and one 24-track recorder along with Shure and AKG microphones. The synthesizer parts were played on a Minimoog and an Oberheim Eight Voice, the majority of which were recorded through Fender Twin Reverb and Vox AC30 amplifiers. It is the Oberheim Eight Voice that was used to create the sounds right at the opening of the song. The instrumental track for "Mexican Radio" was created using two different drum machines: a Roland TR-808 and a Kalamazoo Rhythm Ace, an older device once owned by voice actor Daws Butler.

== Music video ==
The video for "Mexican Radio" was featured regularly on MTV in the weeks following its release. It was the first music video created by filmmaker and former the Bruthers frontman Frank Delia, who had been a long-time friend of Wall of Voodoo band members. The video impressed the Ramones, who hired Delia to direct videos for them as a result.

The video includes bizarre imagery, including a shot of Ridgway's face surfacing from a bowl of beans. Some of the footage was shot in Tijuana, Mexico at the bullfights. Actor Carel Struycken makes a brief appearance playing the video's director.

The video cost $15,000 to make and was originally shot on film.

== Critical reception ==
In 1983 Jim Sullivan of The Boston Globe called "Mexican Radio" a "mildly warped tune...with irresistibly catchy melody lines," and Moira McCormick of Billboard magazine called it an "intriguingly quirky single" in 1985. Smash Hits thought that the instrumentation resembled music from the Doors despite the synth-heavy arrangement. In 2012 Rolling Stone said "it's a pretty unconventional pop song, but it's extremely catchy. NPR referred to "Mexican Radio" as "such a wonderfully weird song" and "one of the most compelling, memorable sing-alongs ever" in 2020.

The song gained cult status and was often played on radio stations featuring punk and new wave music. Being the only single by Wall of Voodoo to reach the top 100 in the US, the band is considered a one-hit wonder.

Ridgway, who left Wall of Voodoo in 1983 to embark on a solo career, told Mix magazine in 2005: "The 'one-hit wonder' status of 'Mexican Radio' is not something to be ashamed of. Obviously, it's not all the band was about, and it's possible the light from it blinded some people from hearing other things the band did, but it exposed a lot of people to our music who probably wouldn't have heard it — and maybe because of it, after Wall of Voodoo I was lucky enough to continue to write songs and make music. If there wasn't a 'Mexican Radio,' you probably wouldn't be talking to me now."

== Track listing ==
=== 7" single ===
Side A

1. "Mexican Radio" — 3:55

Side B

1. "Call of the West" — 6:00
- In the United States, two different catalog numbers were shown on the seven-inch single. The first, SP-70963 on IRS label was for promotional use only and issued without a picture sleeve. The second, IR-9912 on IRS label released for both promotional and commercial use with a picture sleeve.

=== Two Songs by Wall of Voodoo 12" single I.R.S. Sp-070407 ===
Side A

1. "Mexican Radio" — 3:56

Side B

1. "There's Nothing on This Side" — 10:08
- Side B is actually two separate tracks. The first is an instrumental piece, which leads directly into "Mexican Radio (Limited Edition Special Dub Mix)", which is unlisted.

=== 1989 mini CD reissue ===
1. "Mexican Radio" — 3:55
2. "Tomorrow" — 2:43
3. "Call of the West" — 5:35
- Tracks 2 and 3 recorded live at Barstow Auditorium, Barstow, CA on August 18, 1982.

== Charts ==
Chart (1982–1983)	Peak position
Australia (ARIA)	33
Canada Top Singles (RPM)	18
New Zealand (Recorded Music NZ)	21
UK Singles (Official Charts)	64
US Cash Box Top 100	55
US Billboard Hot 100	58
US Top Tracks	41
