= Joe Nanini =

American drummer

- Born: Oliver Joseph Nanini; March 26, 1955; Japan
- Origin: Los Angeles, California, U.S.
- Died: December 4, 2000 (aged 45) Atlanta, Georgia, U.S.
- Genres: Punk rock; post-punk; new wave
- Instruments: Drums; percussion
- Years active: 1977 – 2000
- Labels: Dangerhouse; I.R.S.

Oliver Joseph Nanini (March 26, 1955 – December 4, 2000) was an American rock drummer, most famous for being the percussionist and a founding member of new wave group Wall of Voodoo during their heyday in the 1980s. Nanini was born in Japan in 1955 to a United States military family.

He was known for playing with pots, pans, and other objects. This arrangement can be seen in the motion picture Urgh! A Music War in which Wall Of Voodoo performed a live version of the song "Back In Flesh" from the Dark Continent album, and also later in the video for the hit single "Mexican Radio". Along with Stan Ridgway and Bill Noland, he last performed with Wall Of Voodoo at the US Festival in 1983, but would go on to record with members Marc Moreland and Chas T. Gray for the project known as International Voodoo from September 1983 to March 1984.

Nanini went on to become one of the co-founders of the neo-traditional band The Lonesome Strangers and played on their first record, Lonesome Pine.

He was also the drummer for numerous 1970s punk bands, including Black Randy and the Metrosquad, The Plugz, and Bags. Before his death, he was a session musician for Dangerhouse Records recording with many bands, notably recording with the band Sienna Nanini during the 1990s. Nanini and his fellow musician, known only as Lamb Cannon, believed the "Los Angeles club scene" was "disgusting" and decided to commit to a cabaret act and recorded an album called Pants down time. The recordings were not released until 2013.

Nanini died at his Atlanta home on December 4, 2000, of a brain hemorrhage, at age 45.
