= Wall of Voodoo =

American rock band (1977–1989)

- Wall of Voodoo, 1982 lineup (left to right): Joe Nanini, Chas T. Gray, Stan Ridgway, Marc Moreland.

Background information
- Origin: Los Angeles, California, U.S.
- Genres: Post-punk; new wave; art rock
- Years active: 1977–1989
- Label: I.R.S.
- Past members: Stan Ridgway; Marc Moreland; Bruce Moreland; Chas T. Gray; Joe Nanini; Bill Noland; Andy Prieboy; Ned Leukhardt
- Website: wallofvoodoo.net

Wall of Voodoo was an American rock band from Los Angeles, California who were active from 1977 until disbanding in 1989. Though largely an underground act for the majority of its existence, the band came to prominence when its 1982 single "Mexican Radio" became popular on MTV and alternative radio. The band was known for surrealist lyrics drawing on iconography of the American Southwest.

== History ==
=== Formation ===
Wall of Voodoo had its roots in Acme Soundtracks, a film score business started by Stan Ridgway, later the vocalist and harmonica player for Wall of Voodoo. Acme Soundtracks' office was across the street from the Hollywood punk club The Masque and Ridgway was soon drawn into the emerging punk/new wave scene. Marc Moreland, guitarist for the Skulls, began jamming with Ridgway at the Acme Soundtracks office and the soundtrack company morphed into a new wave band. In 1977, with the addition of Skulls members Bruce Moreland (Marc Moreland's brother) as bassist and Chas T. Gray as keyboardist, along with Joe Nanini, who had been the drummer for the Bags, the Eyes, and Black Randy and the Metrosquad, the first lineup of the band was born, named Wall of Voodoo before their first show in reference to a comment made by Joe Berardi, a friend of Ridgway's and member of the Fibonaccis. According to Ridgway, "I've always been interested in Phil Spector and his wall-of-sound approach to recording. And Wall of Voodoo seemed to describe best what we were doing."

=== 1977–1983 ===
"Ring of Fire"
Sample of Wall of Voodoo "Ring of Fire" from Wall of Voodoo EP (1980).

"Mexican Radio"
Sample of Wall of Voodoo "Mexican Radio" from Call of the West (1982).

"Far Side of Crazy"
Sample of Wall of Voodoo "Far Side of Crazy" from Seven Days in Sammystown (1985).

Wall of Voodoo released a self-titled EP in 1980 which featured a synthesizer-driven cover of "Ring of Fire." The second half of "Ring of Fire" features a dissonant guitar solo covering the theme to the 1966 film Our Man Flint. The band's first full-length album, Dark Continent, followed in 1981. Much of the material from this record would feature in live shows over the next few years, such as "Red Light", "Animal Day" and fan favorite "Back in Flesh". Bruce Moreland left the band for the first time soon after this, and Chas Gray performed both bass and synthesizers during this time. The band recorded their biggest-selling album, Call of the West, in 1982. A single, "Mexican Radio," about border blaster radio stations, became an international hit, peaking at No. 18 in Canada, No. 21 in New Zealand and No. 33 in Australia. It also reached No. 64 in the UK, and was their only Top 100 hit in the United States. As well, the video received considerable exposure on the newly formed MTV.

Bill Noland was added as a keyboardist soon after the release of Call of the West. That same year, Wall of Voodoo opened for the Residents on the cult band's inaugural tour, "the Mole Show," at Perkins Palace in Pasadena, Halloween 1982, and for Devo's ill-fated televised 3-DEVO Concert in October.

Wall of Voodoo opened for Oingo Boingo on their Nothing to Fear tour at the Arlington Theater in Santa Barbara in March 1983. Stan Ridgway has claimed that the situation around the band was increasingly chaotic during this era, with a great deal of drug use and out-of-control behavior on the part of the band members, as well as shady behavior by the band's management and record label. Wall of Voodoo appeared at the second US Festival on May 28, 1983 (the largest concert the band had performed), immediately after which Ridgway, Nanini, and Noland all left the band. Stan Ridgway soon went on to a successful solo career. He appeared as a guest vocalist on a track on the Rumble Fish score and released his critically acclaimed debut solo album The Big Heat, which included the single "Camouflage", a top ten hit across Europe, in 1986. Joe Nanini soon resurfaced in the country rock band Lonesome Strangers.

=== 1983–1989 ===
The remainder of the band, Marc Moreland, Chas T. Gray and a returning Bruce Moreland, carried on under the name Wall of Voodoo. Soon after, Andy Prieboy, formerly of the San Francisco new wave band Eye Protection, joined as singer and Ned Leukhardt was added as drummer. They issued a UK-only single, "Big City", in 1984, and contributed a track to the film Weird Science in 1985. Later that year, they released Seven Days in Sammystown. The first single, "Far Side of Crazy", did well in Australia, reaching number 23 on the ARIA charts. The song is still heard today on the Austereo Triple M network.

In 1987, the band released their fourth studio album, Happy Planet. The album, their second with Andy Prieboy as frontman, saw Call of the West's Richard Mazda returning as producer. Happy Planet spawned another hit in Australia: a cover of the Beach Boys' "Do It Again", which charted at No. 40 there. The video for the song featured the Beach Boys' own Brian Wilson. Bruce Moreland left the band prior to the subsequent tour. They did the soundtrack for the 1989 horror comedy film C.H.U.D. II: Bud the C.H.U.D. Later that year, Wall of Voodoo split up, and Andy Prieboy and Marc Moreland went on to solo careers.

=== Post-breakup ===
In 1989, a post-breakup live album entitled The Ugly Americans in Australia was issued, which documented their 1987 tour of Melbourne, Australia. (Additional performances from a date in Bullhead City, Arizona, were also included.) Stan Ridgway, Andy Prieboy and Marc Moreland all embarked on solo careers throughout the 1990s and 2000s. Joe Nanini released an EP under the name Sienna Nanini in 1996.

Two former members died in the early 2000s: Joe Nanini suffered a brain hemorrhage on December 4, 2000, and Marc Moreland died of kidney and liver failure on March 13, 2002.

On July 18, 2006, a Stan Ridgway-fronted Wall of Voodoo performed at the Pacific Amphitheatre in Orange County as an opening band for Cyndi Lauper. However, other than Ridgway, none of the surviving Wall of Voodoo members were included in this lineup: Joe Berardi and Voodoo producer Richard Mazda performed instead. Ridgway's album Snakebite: Blacktop Ballads and Fugitive Songs (2005) features the narrative song "Talkin' Wall of Voodoo Blues Pt. 1", a history of the band in song.

A remastered coupling of Dark Continent and Call of the West was released by Raven Records on November 10, 2009. On October 2, 2012, Raven issued a companion two-disc set containing all three albums from the Andy Prieboy era (Seven Days in Sammystown, Happy Planet and Ugly Americans in Australia), all remastered, including three bonus tracks.

In 2015 Andy Prieboy stated: "We won't do a Voodoo reunion without Marc. So until he shows up, sorry, no reunion."

In late 2023 Andy Prieboy and Chas T. Gray launched a website under the name "Wall of Voodoo 2", announcing the upcoming release of recently rediscovered and previously unreleased recordings. These recordings consisted of live recordings, master tracks as well as demos dating back to 1983 when the group consisted of only Gray and Marc Moreland. The first set of recordings, The Lost Tapes Vol. 1, was released on November 25, 2023 and featured 11 tracks recorded live during their Happy Planet tour sometime in 1987. Museums: The Lost Tapes Vol. 2 was released on March 15, 2024, and contained 12 demos recorded by Gray and Moreland (as "International Voodoo") sometime after the 1983 US Festival performance. Roughly half of these tracks never made it on any album, the other half consisting of "Big City" and three versions of "Museums" from Seven Days in Sammystown and three versions of "Deep in the Jungle" (from the Weird Science soundtrack).

== Musical style ==
According to Popdose, the band's sound was shaped by merging Stan Ridgway's "love of bebop and country music" with Marc Moreland's "affection for electronic pioneers such as Kraftwerk". According to AllMusic biographer Jason Ankeny, the band's lyrics were "cinematic narratives – heavily influenced by Westerns and film noir". Ridgway's vocal style has been described as having a "droll, narcoleptic manner" and the band's music as "atonal, electronically based". According to NPR, the band "weaved [cultural references] like noir [and] Spaghetti Western" with music that was a "tip-of-the-hat to Ennio Morricone". According to Trouser Press, Wall of Voodoo was "Poised uneasily between machine music and rock’n’roll" and the band "embodied the conflict between old and new for the serious-minded: classy Halloween music that’s scary, but pleasantly so." Record Collector magazine described Wall of Voodoo as combining "western Americana motifs with angular art-rock to delicious effect. It was as if stream-of-conscious cowboy movies were being scored by a triumvirate of Sparks, Devo and Talking Heads." Ridgway said, regarding the band's style, "I've always been interested in Phil Spector and his wall-of-sound approach to recording. [The name] Wall of Voodoo seemed to describe best what we were doing." Rolling Stone described Wall of Voodoo as a post-punk band. Reviewer Mark Deming called Wall of Voodoo a new wave band.

== Band members ==
=== Final lineup ===
- Marc Moreland – guitar (1977–1989; died 2002)
- Chas T. Gray – keyboards (1977–1989), backing vocals (1982–1989), bass (1982–1985, 1987–1989)
- Andy Prieboy – vocals, keyboards, guitar (1984–1989)
- Ned Leukhardt – drums, percussion (1984–1989)

=== Former members ===
- Stan Ridgway – vocals, harmonica, keyboards, guitar (1977–1983)
- Joe Nanini – drums, percussion (1977–1984; died 2000)
- Bruce Moreland – bass, keyboards (1977–1982, 1985–1987)
- Bill Noland – keyboards (1982–1983)

== Discography ==
=== Studio albums ===
Year	Title	US	AUS
1981	Dark Continent	177	-
1982	Call of the West	45	-
1985	Seven Days in Sammystown	-	50
1987	Happy Planet	-	83

=== Live albums ===
Year	Title	US	AUS
1988	The Ugly Americans in Australia	-	-
2023	The Lost Tapes Vol. 1	-	-

=== Compilations ===
- Granma's House (1984)
- The Index Masters (includes the Wall of Voodoo EP + bonus live tracks) (1991)
- Dark And Crazy - A Retrospective (1992)
- Lost Weekend: The Best of the I.R.S. Years (2011) No. 55 Brazil iTunes Charts
- Museums: The Lost Tapes Vol. 2 (2024)

=== Singles ===
Year	Title	UK	CA	AUS	NZ	US	US-D	US-R
1982	"Ring of Fire"	-	-	-	-	-	-	-
1982	"On Interstate 15"	-	-	-	-	-	-	-
1983	"Mexican Radio"	64	18	33	21	58	-	41
1983	"Call of the West"	-	-	-	-	-	-	-
1983	"There's Nothing on This Side"	-	-	-	-	-	-	-
1984	"Big City"	-	-	-	-	-	-	-
1985	"Far Side of Crazy"	-	-	23	-	-	-	-
1987	"Do It Again"	-	-	40	-	-	32	-
1987	"Elvis Bought Dora a Cadillac"	-	-	-	-	-	-	-

=== EPs ===
Year	Title	UK	CA	AU	NZ	US	US-D	US-R
1980	Wall of Voodoo	-	-	-	-	204	-	-

=== Bootlegs ===
- Take Me to Your Leader: 78-79 Demos (contains early demos from 1978 and 1979)
- Heaven or Anaheim Demos (all years of the tracks are unknown, but they appear to be demos from the Andy Prieboy era)
