= Chris Strouth =

American musical artist (born 1968)

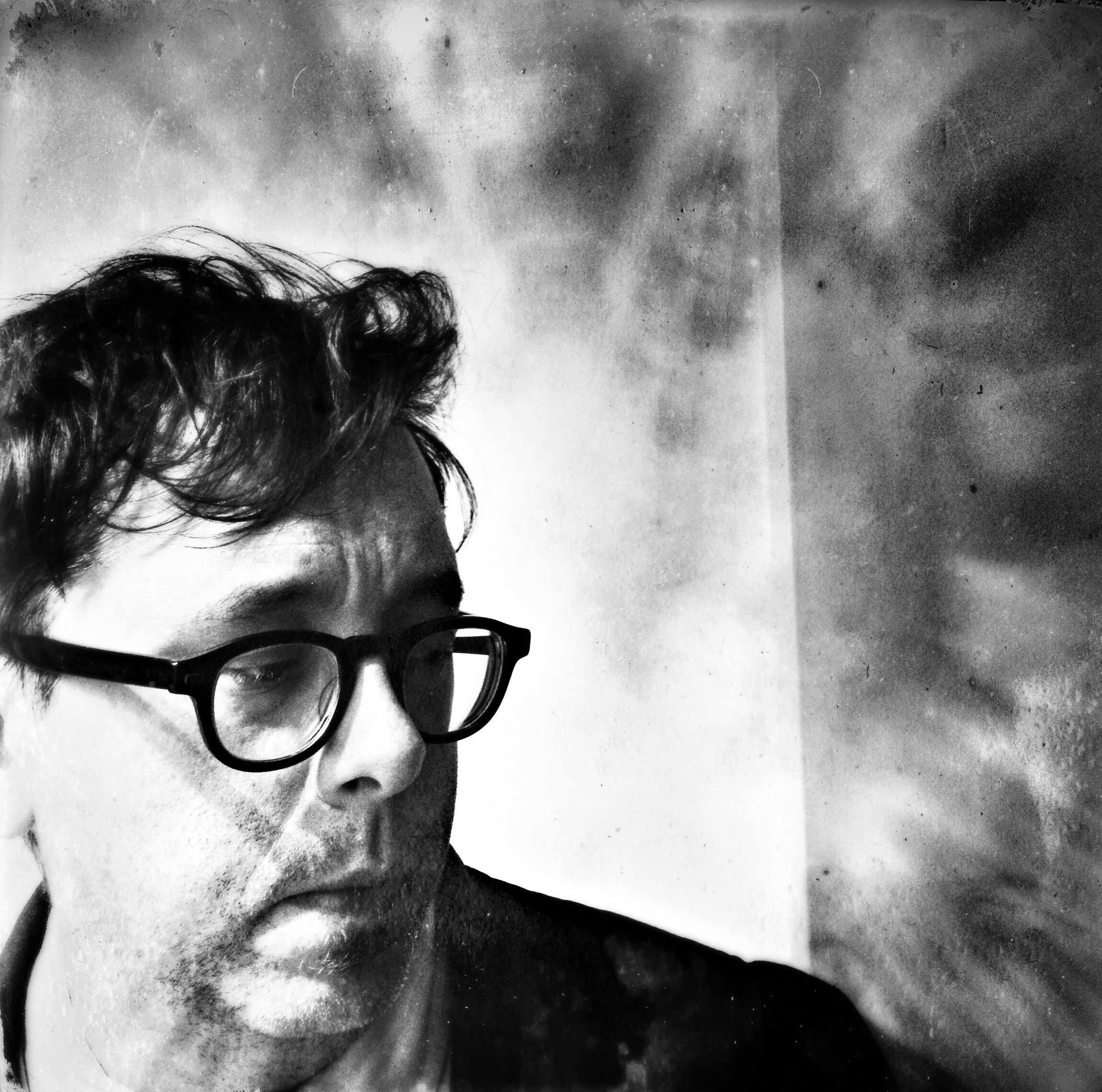
- Chris Strouth in 2014

Background information
- Born: July 28, 1968 (age 58)
- Origin: Minneapolis, Minnesota, U.S.
- Genres: Electronic, new music, ambient, indie rock
- Occupations: Musician, composer, producer, filmmaker, writer, multimedia artist
- Years active: 1986–present
- Labels: UltraModern Records, Innova Recordings, Twin/Tone

Chris Strouth is an American, Minneapolis-based musician, producer, writer and filmmaker who has been active since 1986, most notably as the founder and organizer of 1990s/2000s electronica collective Future Perfect Sound System, and most recently as the bandleader and composer for experimental/electronic band Paris 1919. His behind-the-scenes production work includes Indianapolis multimedia artist Stuart Hyatt's Grammy-nominated album The Clouds. Strouth also gained national attention in 2009 when he received a life-saving kidney transplant from a donor who connected with him on Twitter, which is believed to be the first such transplant arranged entirely through social networking.

== Early life ==
Strouth was raised in Fridley, Minnesota. He became interested in art and music at an early age, learning how to experiment with tape recorders at age seven.

Strouth has been heavily involved in the Twin Cities arts and music community from a young age. His early work included curating multimedia events incorporating art and electronic music at underground art spaces including Rifle Sport Gallery, Hair Police and Red Eye Collaboration. The day after his high school graduation in 1986, Strouth began volunteering at Rifle Sport on Minneapolis' then-notorious Block E. He quickly became publicity director, and eventually managed the space. At the same time, Strouth was a member of the fraternity Delta Kappa Epsilon's chapter at the University of Minnesota. On the podcast Legacy Matters, he said that even though his art-punk sensibility wasn't an obvious match for a straitlaced organization such as DKE ("I had blue hair and a cape when I pledged," he noted), "I liked this idea of having a connection greater than myself. At a time when I was absolutely rootless, I needed something that gave me roots, because I didn't have family to connect to. It was really kind of powerful."

== Music ==
=== As composer/performer ===
As a performer, Strouth has played in a range of styles including techno, jazz, and punk. He has also worked frequently as an organizer of entire scenes of bands, typified by the electronica collective Future Perfect Sound System, which he founded in 1995.

==== Future Perfect Sound System ====
The collective was an important early exponent of electronic music and rave culture in the Midwest, receiving favorable comparisons to Andy Warhol's Exploding Plastic Inevitable multimedia events. Future Perfect performed frequently at First Avenue nightclub, the Walker Art Center, Weisman Art Museum, and other galleries, with showcases that sometimes drew more than 30 performers, and released two albums, 1997's Music For Listening and 2001's The Nature of Time.

==== Paris 1919 ====
In 2009, Strouth founded another musical collective, Paris 1919, named for the post-World War I artistic renaissance. The project was founded shortly before his diagnosis with kidney disease, and Strouth's compositions for the band often deal with his illness and recovery. For instance, the short piece "Blood Mountain" is about Strouth's experience on dialysis, and bases its core rhythms on those of dialysis machines. Paris 1919 began as a solo, studio-bound experiment in sonic collages; Strouth has described the music as sounding "weird and chaotic and structureless and purposely off-beat" but notes that it is also created from a painstaking process which may involve more than 1,000 edits. It grew into a semi-improvisational live band with a rotating membership, which has performed a series of multimedia shows combining music, theater and dance in immersive environments, often working with choreographer Deborah Jinza Thayer. 2014's "Antarctica" used the theme of an ice cave to explore Strouth's journey through his kidney ailment and recovery. The same year's "Safe As Houses" placed both performers and audience in a giant dollhouse as a metaphor for the housing crisis and Strouth's own loss of his home the year before.

Paris 1919 has also recorded and released several albums. Book Of Job was released in 2011 on Go Johnny Go Records. Antarctica, a companion album to the stage performance, was released in 2017 by UltraModern Records. In 2018, Strouth released Risking Light, a soundtrack album to director Dawn Mikkelson's documentary about forgiveness. Although credited to Paris 1919, the album was written and performed by Strouth as a solo work. A fourth album, Collected Short Fictions, was never released, but in 2022, Strouth compiled several of the songs intended for the album as the collection Future Archaeology, which consists of material originally recorded circa 2010 to 2012.

Strouth has also frequently led Paris 1919 in creating live soundtracks to silent films, including Alfred Hitchcock's The Lodger: A Story of the London Fog, and the 1930 mystery The Bat Whispers at the 2014 Minneapolis Comic-Con.

==== Snaildartha ====
Strouth composed, produced and (with storyteller and comedian Matt Fugate) co-wrote the 2004 jazz and spoken-word holiday album Snaildartha: The Story of Jerry the Christmas Snail, which features a band including saxophonist George Cartwright of the jazz group Curlew. Originally created in 1993 for a performance-art series at Red Eye Theater in Minneapolis, a revised version was recorded in 2003 and issued privately as a Christmas gift. The following year, the album was given a wider release by Innova Recordings. A remastered digital edition of Snaildartha was released by Stand Up! Records on November 13, 2020. The album has developed a cult following thanks to its regular inclusion in DJ Jon Solomon's daylong marathon of Christmas music on Princeton, New Jersey radio station WPRB-FM, as well as an annual Christmas broadcast on KFAI in Minneapolis. The album's reputation has continued to grow with time; in 2022, Vulture writer Maura Johnston named Snaildartha one of the 50 best Christmas albums of the last 30 years, calling it "an ideal lazy Christmas Day soundtrack" that "gets even better with repeated listenings."

==== Other projects ====
In 2011, Strouth was a conductor for the four-act opera Czeslaw's Loop, performed live on a floating barge on the Mississippi River, which included performers as diverse as classical soprano Maria Jette, techno-pop group Information Society's Paul Robb, and Tom Hazelmyer of the punk band Halo of Flies.

In 2018, Paris 1919 performed ...For Now, a project combining symphonic, Eastern European, minimalistic, and Renaissance folk music elements, at the Church of St. Boniface in Minneapolis. Strouth joked to an interviewer for Minnesota Public Radio that ...For Now was his "middle-aged symphony to God," referencing Brian Wilson's description of the Beach Boys album Smile as a "teenage symphony to God."

Strouth's early band King Paisley and the Pscho-del-ics performed at Rifle Sport and released a nine-song album in 1986, Death Rockin', which was re-released in 2011 on Go Johnny Go.

=== As producer ===
Besides composing and performing music, Strouth founded his own label, UltraModern Records, in 1995, and was the director of artists and product at two other influential Minneapolis labels, Twin/Tone Records (1995–2001) and Innova Recordings (2001–2004). At Innova, Strouth worked on albums by dozens of artists including Revolutionary Snake Ensemble, Beat Circus, Matthew Burtner, George Cartwright, Victoria Jordanova, Phillip Johnston, and Hyatt's Grammy-nominated album The Clouds. Twin/Tone, already nationally prominent thanks to a roster including alternative-rock pioneers The Replacements, grew to develop an umbrella relationship with a dozen smaller indie labels, including UltraModern.

UltraModern focused on neo-psychedelic, indie-pop, and noise/electronic rock, releasing albums by musicians including ex-Wall Of Voodoo leader Stan Ridgway, jazz guitarist Skip Heller, Future Perfect Sound System, Ousia, and Savage Aural Hotbed. UltraModern received wider distribution through partnerships with Twin/Tone, Atomic Theory Records, and New West Records. The label's catalog includes:

- Vinnie & The Stardüsters, "The Girl From Ipanema Wants To Kill Me" b/w "Quesadilla, Walk Around Naked" (7" vinyl single) (1995)
- Savage Aural Hotbed, Cold is the Absence of Heat (1996)
- The Vibro Champs, Stranger Than You Think (1996)
- Mindphaseone, A Wave Length Away (1997)
- Ousia, Why Is That A Four? (1997)
- Savage Aural Hotbed, Pressure of Silence (1997)
- Skip Heller, Lonely Town (1997)
- Skip Heller, St. Christopher's Arms (1998)
- Various Artists, Future Perfect Sound System: Music For Listening (1998)
- Skip Heller, Couch, Los Angeles (1999)
- Stan Ridgway, Anatomy (1999)
- Stan Ridgway, Holiday in Dirt (2002)

== Film and television ==
Strouth's documentary Unconvention: A Mix-Tape from St. Paul, RNC '08, filmed in 2008 and released in 2009, covered the contentious 2008 Republican National Convention in St. Paul, Minnesota. The film edits together a wide variety of film and video shot by dozens of independent journalists and citizen videographers with divergent political viewpoints, compiling a mosaic of perspectives on the four days of the convention. Unconvention was one of eight full-length features chosen to debut as part of the "Minnesota Made" series at the 2009 Minneapolis–Saint Paul International Film Festival.

Strouth and Minneapolis filmmaker Rick Fuller also co-produced a DVD companion to Stan Ridgway's Holiday in Dirt album featuring 14 short films based on Ridgway's songs, which was released in 2005. In 2006, they co-produced the documentary The M-80 Project, which chronicled a 1979 New Wave music festival at the Walker Art Center. The original videotapes of the groundbreaking festival had gone missing soon after filming; Strouth spent several years trying to find them, and then several more securing music rights for the documentary. The finished film played at several festivals and other venues including Alamo Draft House, San Francisco's Noise Pop Film Festival, Minneapolis' Sound Unseen and the Northwest Film Forum, before one musician unexpectedly withdrew his permission to use footage of his band, eventually leading to the mothballing of the project.

From 1994 to 1996, Strouth produced the documentary series What, which covered the Minneapolis pop and rock scene, for Twin Cities public television station KTCA.

== Kidney transplant ==
In 2009, Strouth learned that he would need a kidney transplant due to the effects of IgA nephropathy (which he nicknamed "Harold" as a way of coping with the disease). He found a matching donor, Scott Pakudaitis, after sharing the news with his followers on Twitter and Facebook, and underwent a successful transplant at the University of Minnesota Medical Center in December 2009. The two men never met in person until the day of the surgery. It is believed to be the first such transplant arranged entirely through social networking. The story received nationwide media attention on ABC News, Reader's Digest, MTV, and The Ricki Lake Show. Following his recovery, Strouth has been a board member of the Minnesota chapter of the National Kidney Foundation since 2010. Strouth had a second kidney transplant in 2022.

== Writing ==
Strouth writes and illustrates the column "Makes No Sense at All" for the Minneapolis alt-weekly City Pages. He has also written for publications such as The Growler and America Online's Digital City.
