= Snaildartha: The Story of Jerry the Christmas Snail =

Jazz and spoken-word holiday album by Snaildartha 6

Snaildartha: The Story of Jerry the Christmas Snail - A Soul Jazz Extravaganza

Studio album by The Snaildartha 6
- Released: January 11, 2004
- Genres: Jazz, spoken word, holiday
- Length: 44:16
- Labels: Innova Recordings, Stand Up! Records
- Producer: Chris Strouth

Professional ratings
Review scores
Source	Rating
Allmusic	4.5/5 stars
Secrets of Home Theater and High Fidelity	4/5 stars

Snaildartha: The Story of Jerry the Christmas Snail - A Soul Jazz Extravaganza is a 2004 jazz and spoken-word holiday album. It was composed and produced by Chris Strouth, and performed by the Snaildartha 6 combo, which includes saxophonist George Cartwright of the jazz group Curlew and storyteller and comic Matt Fugate, who wrote the text with Strouth. The album retells the story of Buddha through a small snail, Jerry the Christmas Snail, who achieves enlightenment after meeting and having adventures with other Christmas-themed animals on a pilgrimage to the North Pole, eventually meeting and bonding with Santa Claus. The title is a pun on the Buddha's birth name, Siddhartha.

Snaildartha was created in 1993 for a performance-art series at Red Eye Theater in Minneapolis. 10 years later, Strouth and Fugate recorded a revised version with saxophonist Cartwright. First issued privately as a Christmas gift, the album was later given a wider release by Innova Recordings. A remastered digital edition of Snaildartha was released by Stand Up! Records on November 13, 2020.

The album has developed a cult following thanks to its regular inclusion in DJ Jon Solomon's daylong marathon of Christmas music on Princeton, New Jersey radio station WPRB-FM, as well as an annual Christmas broadcast on KFAI in Minneapolis. Solomon has played the album in its entirety annually since 2004. It is routinely the highest-streamed portion of the broadcast, and has inspired some listeners to hang snail ornaments from their Christmas trees in tribute.

== Critical reception ==
In 2022, Vulture writer Maura Johnston named Snaildartha one of the 50 best Christmas albums of the last 30 years, calling it "an ideal lazy Christmas Day soundtrack" that "gets even better with repeated listenings."

MinnPost arts critic Pamela Espeland called Snaildartha a "weird but endearing" Christmas tradition, comparing it to the Arlo Guthrie song "Alice's Restaurant" and its ties to Thanksgiving. Avant Music News called it a "future holiday classic" and "a twisted take on the holiday season." Jason Victor Serinus, writing in Secrets of Home Theater and High Fidelity, was more ambivalent, but called the story "charming", especially Fugate's "deadpan delivery".

== Track listing ==
All songs composed by Chris Strouth and performed by Snaildartha featuring Matt Fugate. Text written by Matt Fugate and Chris Strouth.

No.	Title	Length
1.	"Rhapsody in Snail"	1:05
2.	"A Snail Is Born"	4:22
3.	"Interlude in Snail"	2:08
4.	"The Te of Bob"	2:05
5.	"Snail Night, Holy Night"	1:50
6.	"Gift of the Menagerie"	2:26
7.	"Snails Pacing"	1:51
8.	"A Pilgrims Progress"	1:51
9.	"Frostbitten Paws"	2:00
10.	"Waiting For Claus"	2:12
11.	"A Childs Christmas in Snails"	1:27
12.	"Breakfast With Santa"	3:02
13.	"Escargot a Go Go"	1:03
14.	"Santa's Little Helper"	3:12
15.	"Snail on the Keys"	1:24
16.	"Claus and Effect"	2:46
17.	"On the Half Shell"	1:27
18.	"Discovering the Snail Within"	4:39
19.	"Happy Glitter Trails"	3:26

== Credits ==
- As told by: Matt Fugate
- Sax: George Cartwright
- Drums: Terry Haanen
- Organ: Scott LeGere
- Mixed by: Brian Jacoby
- Mastered by: Bob DeMaa
- Produced and directed by: Chris Strouth
