= Skip Heller =

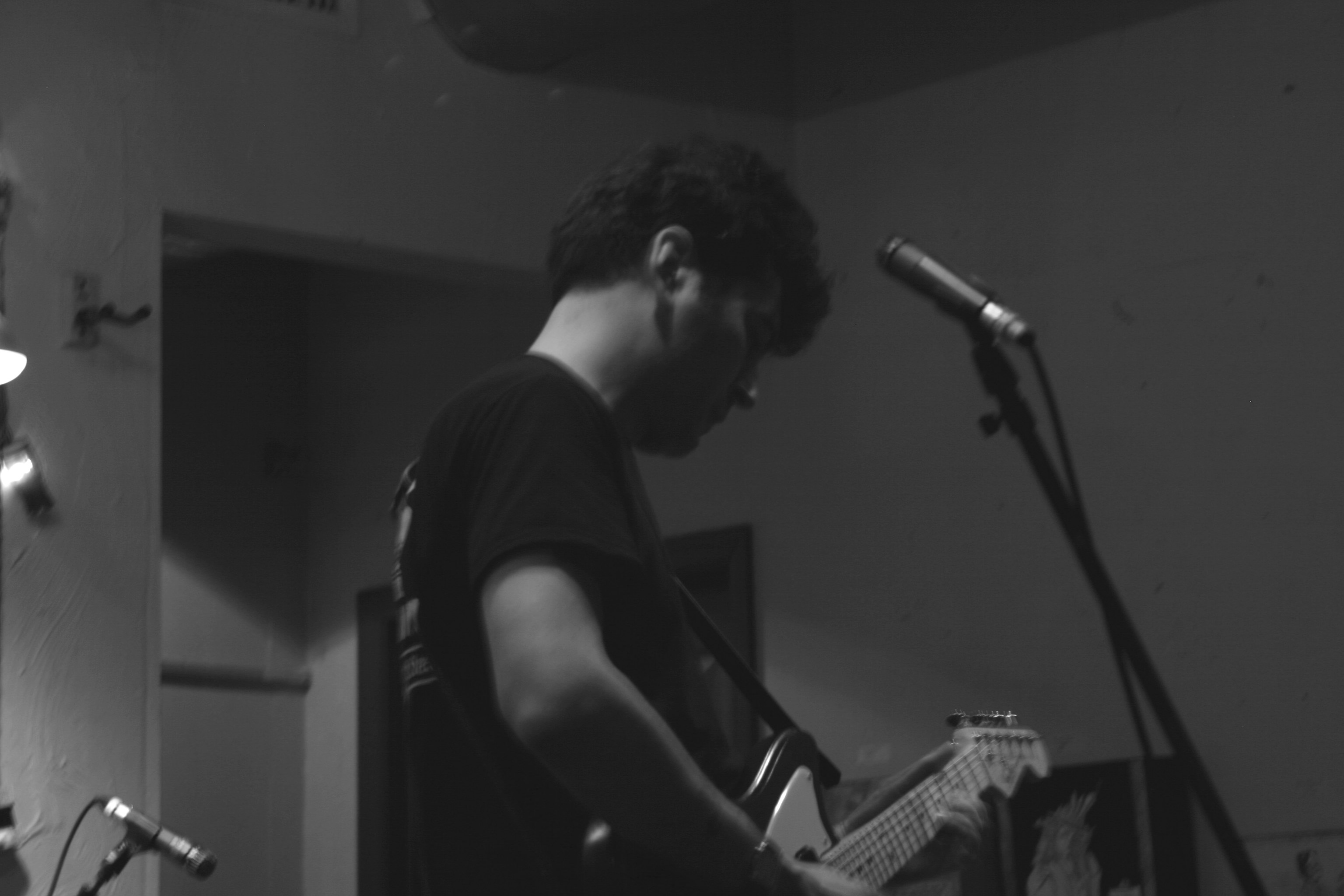
- Skip Heller at the Family Wash in 2007

Background information
- Born: Fred Heller; October 4, 1965 (age 60); Philadelphia, Pennsylvania
- Genres: Exotica, rockabilly, Country
- Occupations: Musician, composer, producer, bandleader
- Instrument: Guitar
- Years active: 1992–present
- Labels: Dionysus, Twin/Tone, Innova, UltraModern

Fred Steven "Skip" Heller (born October 4, 1965) is an American singer, songwriter, and guitarist. Although active in many different types of music as a performer, producer, and historian coming out of the Philadelphia jazz scene, and in spite of local critical recognition, he did not make a large mark in his hometown.

== Early life ==
Fred Steven Heller was born on October 4, 1965, in Philadelphia. He was the oldest of three children born to an Italian father and a Jewish mother.

== Music career ==
In 1994, he began commuting between Philadelphia and Southern California. Within a year, he had moved west and become a prolific record producer and player, largely working for independent labels like Dionysus and UltraModern, with rockabilly artists such as Sammy Masters, Dee Lannon, and Ray Campi, and also producing reissues of vintage exotica for the label.

In 1999, he released Couch, Los Angeles, which showcased him as a composer, arranger, band leader, and guitarist. Heller did not make a new album for another three years. He did, however, start writing television music for such shows The Flintstones: On the Rocks and Dexter's Laboratory.

Homegoing, on the Innova Records label, is a stripped down organ combo date that took Heller back to his Philly jazz roots while featuring new compositions. He started touring, and followed Homegoing with Fakebook (Hyena Records), another organ-based quartet release—this time concentrating on songs by favorite composers, including Duke Ellington, Bob Dylan, and Prince.

The following year, he signed to the tiny Dreambox Media label, and simultaneously released two discs, Out of Time!, an all-standards organ trio date recorded live in Philadelphia, and Bear Flag, an all-originals date recorded in California. Bear Flag included nods to Bakersfield honky-tonk, vintage organ trio swinging, Curtis Mayfield, Frank Zappa, and a myriad of other influences. He also wrote and self-published the book Glamour Profession.

The following year, he started his own label, Skyeways, while cutting a deal with Ropeadope Records to handle his digital distribution, while retaining his own right to manufacture. The first release under this arrangement, 2006's Mean Things Happening in This Land, concentrated largely on world music. Also released in 2006 was an expanded release of Couch, Los Angeles, an original exotica score for Tilt (a pinball documentary). Production began on a documentary about Heller himself, called Hearing That Noise Was My First Ever Feeling, the title taken from a lyric in The Clash's "Lost in the Supermarket." He participated in two shows that paid tribute to the bluegrass musician John Hartford, and recorded a new album at Memphis' Sun Records studio.

A multi-instrumentalist, Heller plays guitar, keyboards and bass. He has worked with a wide array of artists, including Yma Sumac, NRBQ, Bootsy Collins, Todd Rundgren, Los Lobos, and Joe Bataan. He has continued to work as a producer, composer and bandleader. In late 2019, he assembled the Hollywood Film Noirchestra, bringing together an ensemble of players whose abilities ran the gamut from jazz to chamber music, Latin music, funk, world music, and beyond. The group resurrects music from the seedy underbelly of mid-20th Century film and television.
