= All the Pretty Horses =

All the Pretty Horses may refer to:

- All the Pretty Horses (novel), a 1992 novel by Cormac McCarthy
- All the Pretty Horses (film), a 2000 film based on the novel
- All the Pretty Little Horses, a 2016 novella by Mira Grant published in Rise: The Complete Newsflesh Collection
- "All the Pretty Little Horses" (also known as "Hush-a-bye"), a traditional lullaby from the Southern United States
- All the Pretty Horses (band), American glam-punk band fronted by Venus de Mars

== See also ==
- All the Pretty Little Horses (album), a 1996 album by English band Current 93
