= The Nature of Time =

Studio album by Future Perfect Sound System
- Released: 25 September 2001
- Genre: Electronic music, new music, ambient music, indie rock
- Length: 65:48
- Label: Innova Recordings
- Producer: Chris Strouth

Future Perfect Sound System chronology
| Music For Listening (1997) | The Nature of Time (2001) |

Professional ratings
Review scores
| Source | Rating |
|---|---|
| Allmusic | 2/5 stars |
| Sonoloco Record Reviews | (positive) |
| Computer Music Journal | (positive) |

The Nature of Time is the second album by Twin Cities-based electronica collective Future Perfect Sound System. The album features work from a diverse range of electronica genres. It was produced by Future Perfect organizer and Minneapolis record producer Chris Strouth, and released by Minneapolis record label Innova Recordings. A loose-knit concept album revolving around allegorical notions of time, The Nature of Time was conceived as a continuation of a March 2000 Future Perfect performance at the Frederick R. Weisman Museum of Art in Minneapolis, though the individual songs were recorded by the various groups separately in the studio.

Critical reception to the album was mixed. Sonoloco reviewer Ingvar Loco Nordin praised it as "illustrious and very original." François Couture of Allmusic called it "perplexing" but acknowledged that it covered a wide range of sound.

== Track listing ==
| No. | Title | Performer (composer) | Length |
|---|---|---|---|
| 1. | "The Nature of Time" | A Most Happy Sound (Chris Strouth) | 6:44 |
| 2. | "Thin Air, Longitude, Tres Elements" | Zaftig | 5:31 |
| 3. | "Thank You Starts" | Big Daddy, Jr. & the Spook | 6:50 |
| 4. | "The Boxer" | Christian Erickson (Paul Simon) | 8:59 |
| 5. | "Remote Delay" | Alpha 61 | 7:46 |
| 6. | "Longitude" | Zaftig | 5:05 |
| 7. | "Sex and Violins" | TS & Filmore Diggz | 4:05 |
| 8. | "Infengal Decrapulation" | The Radar Threat | 5:15 |
| 9. | "Psycho Duo" | Drone | 5:42 |
| 10. | "Tres Elements" | Zaftig | 4:01 |
| 11. | "Essence" | Podling | 2:31 |
