= Music For Listening =

Future Perfect Sound System: Music for Listening

Studio album by Various Artists
- Released: 21 October 1997
- Genre: Electronica, techno
- Label: UltraModern/TRG
- Producer: Chris Strouth

Various Artists chronology
Future Perfect Sound System: Music for Listening (1997)	The Nature of Time (2001)

Professional ratings
Review scores
Source	Rating
Allmusic	4/5 stars

Future Perfect Sound System: Music for Listening, a compilation of electronica, techno and trance music, is the first album by Twin Cities-based electronica collective Future Perfect Sound System. The album features work from a diverse range of electronica genres, and was organized and orchestrated by Minneapolis producer Chris Strouth.

== Track listing ==
No.	Title	Performer (composer)	Length
1.	"Extreme Breaks"	Hard Knee (Greg Stevens)	4:44
2.	"Squeak Space!"	Timeblind (Chris Sattinger)	5:40
3.	"Forceps and Greens"	Squelch One	4:37
4.	"Counter Rotation"	Ousia	7:37
5.	"Rebel Moon"	Kranium	4:44
6.	"Induri Holiday"	Metaphor (Mike Croswell)	3:50
7.	"Track 7"	Mindphaseone (John Golden / Dave Jarosz / Mike McClure)	8:09
8.	"The Alley"	Alley Puppet	5:25
9.	"Governments R Helpless"	Lost In Translation	6:23
10.	"Repeat"	Tempest (Rob Williams)	3:48
11.	"New World"	The Wix	7:27
12.	"Drowning Attitude"	Savage Aural Hotbed	5:47
13.	"Cat Scan"	A Most Happy Sound (Chris Strouth)	3:48
