= Ruth Adams and the World's Most Dangerous Polka Band =

Polka band from Minnesota

Ruth Adams and the World's Most Dangerous Polka Band are a senior citizen polka duet who use a rotation of four different drummers. Adams founded the group in 1974, with Joe Hayden joining in 1996. They received national attention when they appeared on the short-lived Comedy Central series Let's Bowl.

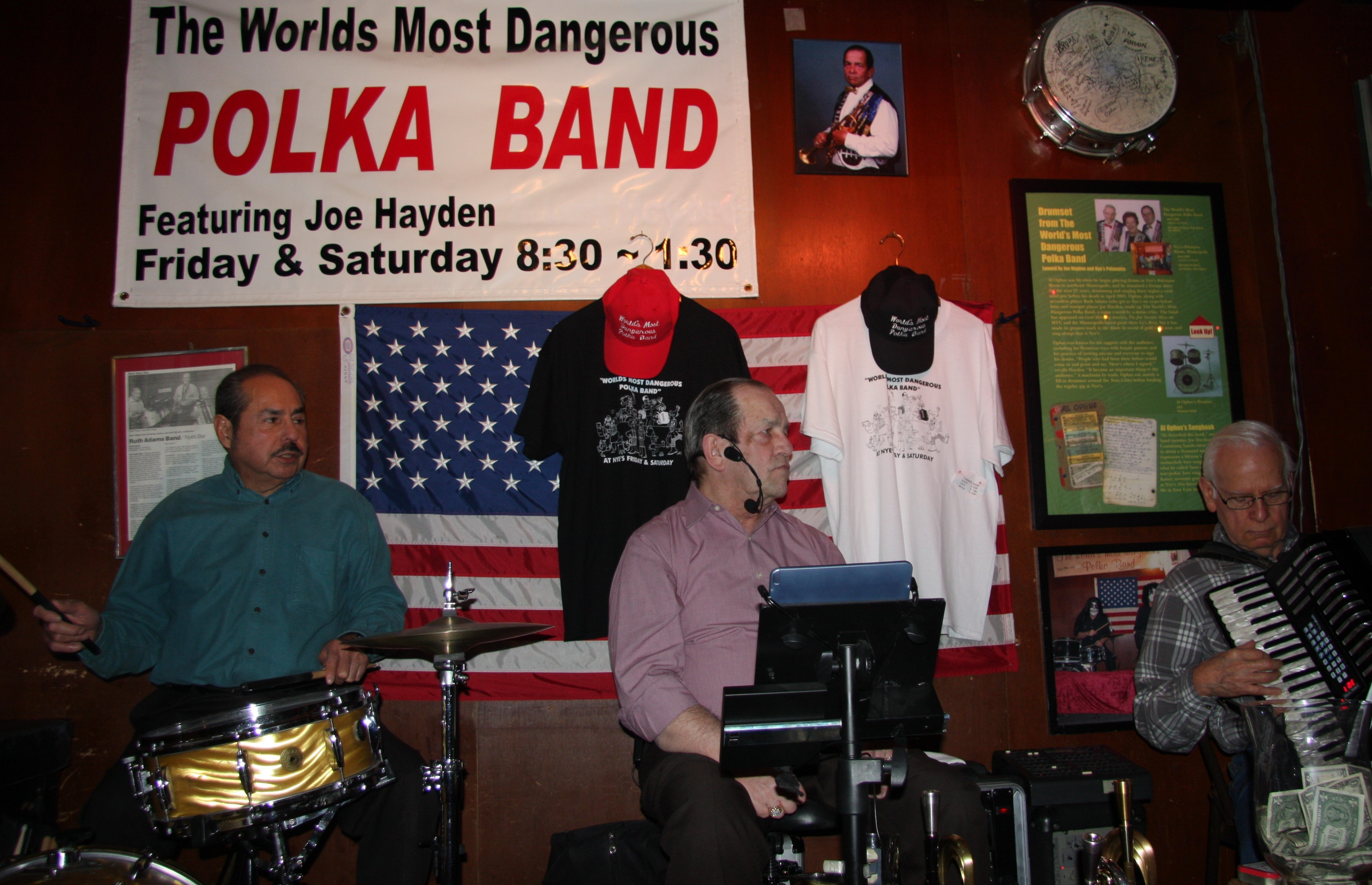
The band in 2015, featuring Joe Hayden

The group consists of Adams on accordion, accompanied by Hayden on trumpet and lead vocals, with the rotation of drummers using a simple snare drum and high-hat percussion setup. Al Ophus was the full-time percussionist until his death in 2003 at the age of 88. His drums are now on display at the Minnesota Historical Society.

According to the band's website, they play "a mix of Polkas, Waltz's [sic], Foxtrots [sic], Country, Latin, and a little Dixieland." During their Let's Bowl appearances, Adams and company played suggestive polka tunes like "She Smoked My Cigar" and "I Told Her No".

They got their start, and still play every Friday and Saturday, at Nye's Polonaise (better known as Nye's Polka Lounge) in northeast Minneapolis. Since the close of Nye's Polonaise, the Polka Band has performed at Can Can Wonderland in Saint Paul, Minnesota.

Ruth Adams died March 18, 2011, at Hennepin County Medical Center after her battle with cancer.
