= The Vibro Champs =

American rockabilly band

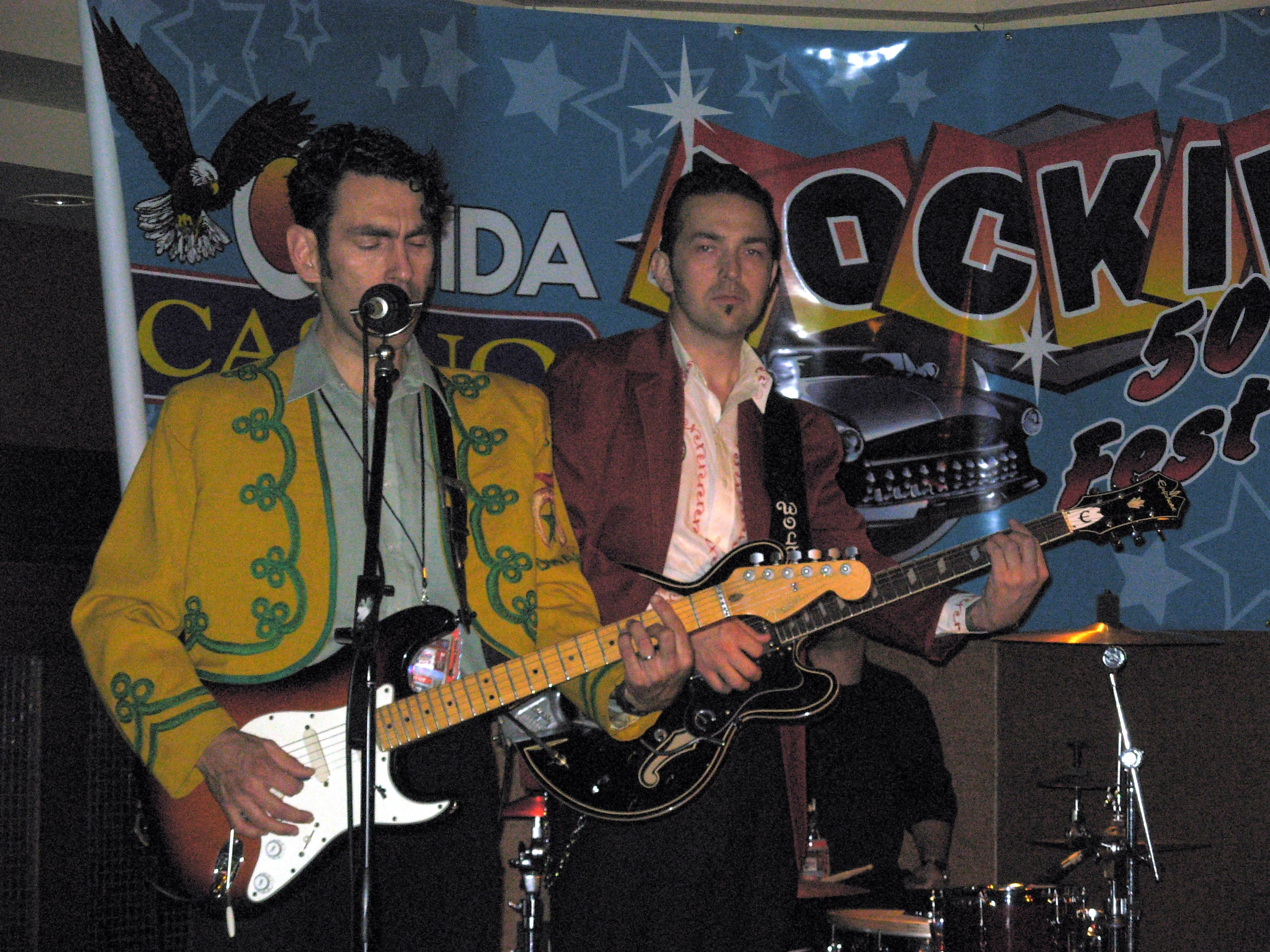
- Alan Subola (left) and Dave Wolfe of The Vibro Champs in 2007

Background information
- Origin: Minneapolis, Minnesota, United States
- Genres: Rockabilly
- Years active: 1993-present
- Members: Dave Wolfe: Guitar, vocals Alan Subola: Guitar, vocals Bill Keefe: Bass; Morris Engel: Drums
- Past members: Mark Shumway; Dan Hogan; Gary Weiss

The Vibro Champs are a rockabilly band based in Minneapolis, Minnesota, founded in 1992. They have released four albums, most recently Mr. International in 2009.

Reviewing the band's second album, writer Jim Walsh said that "Minnesota has given birth to dozens of great rockabilly artists. The latest and perhaps greatest of the lot is the Vibro Champs."

== History ==
Minneapolis Star Tribune music critic Tom Surowicz described the Vibro Champs' sound as "classic rock 'n' roll, surf instrumentals, a dollop of R&B, some undiluted hillbilly fare, obscure cover tunes, a taste of agreeable lounge kitsch, plus a touch of jazz razzmatazz." Paul Hempel of the St. Louis Post-Dispatch praised the band's no-nonsense approach to rockabilly, saying that "It's amazing what a band can do with a pompadour, a sense of humor and a few rockabilly and surf riffs."

=== 1993: Formation and The Stimulating Sounds of... ===
The Vibro Champs formed in Minneapolis in 1992. Before joining the band, guitarist and main songwriter Alan Subola and bassist Bill Keefe, from Madison, Wisconsin, were in the Mood Swings and Phil Gnarly and the Tough Guys. Frontman and guitarist Dave Wolfe played in California punk bands such as Victim's Cause before leading the Twin Cities group Sci-Fi Western.

The Vibro Champs were inspired by 1950s and '60s rockabilly musicians such as Duane Eddy, Gene Vincent, Dick Dale, and the Fendermen, whose goofy but spirited cover of "Mule Skinner Blues" was one of the first rockabilly songs Subola heard as a teenager. The band took its name from a type of Fender guitar amp popular among bands during the original 1950s rockabilly boom.

In the mid-1990s, the group was part of a national revival of swing and rockabilly that included Reverend Horton Heat, Forbidden Pigs, and Southern Culture on the Skids. The Vibro Champs were one of the leading such groups in Minneapolis, becoming known as an integral part of a roots and rockabilly revival centered on the downtown bar Lee's Liquor Lounge, which gained national attention in magazines such as Rolling Stone. Wolfe booked bands for the bar until 2004. Both the Vibro Champs and Subola's related band Bad Companions performed at the final show when Lee's closed in 2019.

The group recorded a self-titled demo on cassette in 1993 with their first drummer, Mark Shumway, who also plays on several tracks on their official debut, The Stimulating Sounds of... The Vibro Champs. Second drummer Dan Hogan plays on the rest of the album.

Stimulating Sounds was well received by critics. Surowicz wrote that the album "gives ample evidence of this rockabilly band's strengths: Cornfed vocals, steamy surf-powered instrumentals, garage-band immediacy and self-deprecating wit." Peter Margasak of the Chicago Reader wrote that the disc showed the band to be "adept revivalists. They span everything from instrumental surf sounds to roughneck psychobilly."

The Vibro Champs were invited to play First Avenue's annual Best New Bands showcase at the end of 1993.

The third Vibro Champs drummer, Gary Weiss, joined in 1994.

The Vibro Champs also toured frequently across the United States. Texas rockabilly singer Ronnie Dawson chose the Vibro Champs as his live backing band for his 1995 tour. The group has also opened for Dick Dale, El Vez, and Horton Heat, among others.

=== 1996: Stranger Than You Think ===
The group's second album, Stranger Than You Think, was released in 1996. It was produced by Minneapolis musician Chris Strouth and released on his label Ultramodern Records. Music writer Jim Walsh praised the album for its respect for rockabilly history, and said that "it's abundantly clear that Dave Wolfe and his crew are passionate students of the genre."

The band appeared on the radio show A Prairie Home Companion in 1996, performing a tribute to Buddy Holly.

=== 1999: Ultra Modern ===
The group's third record, Ultra Modern, was released in 1999. It featured a guest performance on "Beach Party" by Fendermen guitarist Jim Sundquist, whose version of "Mule Skinner Blues" the band had covered on Stranger Than You Think. Phil Dirt of the surf-music website Reverb Central gave Ultra Modern four of four stars, calling the album "marvelous, slightly strange countrified pop'n'roll" and writing that "these cats are a very fun band."

In 2002, the Vibro Champs were featured on the second-season premiere of the Comedy Central TV series Let's Bowl.

Around 2004, the group played less frequently as Wolfe relocated to Austin, Texas, Keefe moved to Switzerland, and Weiss moved to Pittsburgh. The group did not break up, but geographic distance limited their performances.

In 2005, the Vibro Champs were the backing band for a two-show reunion of the Fendermen.

The Vibro Champs contributed the song "I'll Do Anything For Baby" to the three-disc benefit CD Musicians for Minneapolis, which raised money for the victims of the 2007 I-35W Mississippi River bridge collapse. Other musicians included Deke Dickerson, Los Lobos, Steve Vai, Dick Dale, and Les Claypool.

=== 2009 and beyond: Mr. International ===
The group reformed in 2009 for the album Mr. International, released on Minneapolis label Eclectone Records. The disc also included two videos: A music video for the song "I'll Do Anything", and a short documentary about the band, The Vibro Champs In Vibro Vision. Star Tribune music critic Chris Riemenschneider praised the album's "fierce, punky instrumental jams" and said that Wolfe and Subola "get right back to the basics, trading off Duane Eddy/Gene Vincent-style guitar licks and lyrics about babes, hot rods and the men who love them equally."

The band's lineup in 2024 includes founding members Subola, Wolfe, and Keefe, as well as drummer Morris Engel, who also plays in Subola's band Kinda Fonda Wanda.

== Awards ==
The Vibro Champs won two Minnesota Music Awards, in 2000 and 2001, for Best Rockabilly Group.

== Related projects ==
Subola recorded a solo rockabilly album, Powderhorn Park, in 2003. Subola also performs in the roots-rock group The Bad Companions, which has released three albums, as well as rockabilly combo Kinda Fonda Wanda with vocalist Amanda White, specializing in songs by female artists such as Wanda Jackson (the group's namesake), Patsy Cline, Loretta Lynn, and Barbara Mandrell. The band also includes Boiled in Lead bassist Drew Miller and drummer Mo Engel.

Wolfe has also fronted punk band Dave Wolfe and the Wolfmen.

== Discography ==
=== Albums ===
- The Vibro Champs, The Vibro Champs (self-released, 1993)
- The Vibro Champs, The Stimulating Sounds of ... The Vibro Champs (Channel 83 Records/Sci-Fi Western, 1993)
- The Vibro Champs, Stranger Than You Think (Ultramodern Records/Sci-Fi Western, 1996)
- The Vibro Champs, Ultra Modern (Sci-Fi Western, 1999)
- The Vibro Champs, Mr. International (Electone, 2009)

=== Singles ===
- The Vibro Champs, "Besamé Mucho (Kiss Me Much)" b/w "Magic 8 Ball" 7" single (Susstones, 1995)

=== Compilation appearances ===
- "Little Red" on Mad Radish Sampler #2 (Mad Radish, 1993)
- "Foreign Affair" on Minnesota Modern Rock, Volume 1 (93.7 The Edge, 1994)
- "Nashville (Performed Live On Radio K)" on Stuck On AM: Off The Record In Minneapolis (TRG Records/Radio K, 1996)
- "Mongoose Boulevard" on Rock Don't Run Vol. 2 (Spinout Records, 1996)
- "Breathe Hard" on Sota-Pop (1996)
- "She Just Wants To Swing" on The Big Sound Of Now, For Today Kind Of People!: TRG Sampler '96 (TRG Records, 1996)
- "Little Baby Jesus" on The Squealer Presents... Shuffle This (Mohog Music/Tight Vinyl Records, 1997)
- "Martian Trip" on Big Monster Bash Volume #1 (Mouthpiece Records/Sci-Fi Western, 1998)
- "Out With The In Crowd" on Welcome To Swingland (Lee's Liquor Records, 1998)
- "A Dream Is A Wish" on Nightclub 14: True Sounds Of The Twin Cities (1999)
- "High Geared Daddy" on Rock-A-Billy Party 2000 (K-Tel, 1999)
- "Foreign Affair" on Sonic Burlesque (Eyesore Media, 2002)
- "I'll Do Anything For Baby" on Musicians For Minneapolis (Electro-Voice, 2007)

=== Related projects ===
- Phil Gnarly And The Tough Guys, Port-A-Party Pack (self-released, 1985)
- Phil Gnarly And The Tough Guys, Philville (Flaming Pie Records, 1987)
- Phil Gnarly And The Tough Guys, Phil Gnarly & The Tough Guys #4 (Go Speed Racer Go!, 1989)
- Sci-Fi Western, UTAW (Sci-Fi Western, 1989)
- Sci-Fi Western, Don't Let This Happen To You, Boot Leg #1 (Spawn Of The Naughty Planet Industries, 1991)
- The Mood Swings, The Mood Swings (self-released, 1993)
- Alan Subola, Powderhorn Park (2003)
- The Bad Companions, What, Me Worry? (Sideshow Sound, 2012)
- The Bad Companions, 12 Bars (Sideshow Sound, 2015)
- The Bad Companions, Crazy Eights & Heartaches (Sideshow Sound, 2020)
- Kinda Fonda Wanda, Aces (Sideshow Sound, 2021)
