= Rifle Sport Gallery =

Underground art space in Minnesota, US

Coordinates: 44°58′44″N 93°16′28″W

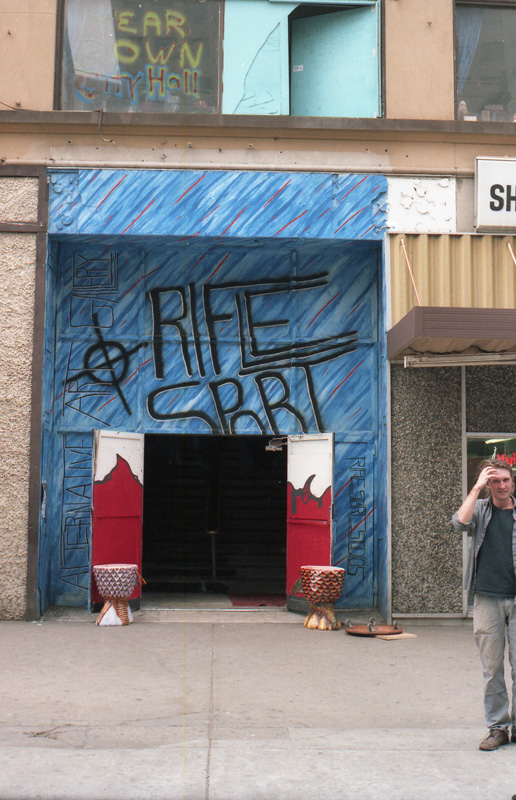
Rifle Sport Alternative Art Gallery entrance in 1988

Rifle Sport Alternative Art Gallery was an underground art space open from 1985 to 1988 in the Block E segment of Hennepin Avenue in downtown Minneapolis, Minnesota. It was an important and groundbreaking venue for non-mainstream and punk-rock art in the Twin Cities. Writer Andy Sturdevant has noted that the gallery's memory and influence have lasted among Twin Cities artists long after its closure, "like it might have happened in a Jacques-Louis David painting."

The gallery was founded in September 1985 by artist Colleen Barnett. It was named after the defunct arcade (whose signage remained) which had previously occupied the space. The neighborhood around Block E attracted a broad cross-section of punks, artists, and musicians, and, because of the infamous bar Moby Dick's next door, as well as the similarly troubled bar Brady's Pub directly below, was also notorious for attracting criminals, vagrants, and alcoholics.

In the three years it was open, around 130 artists, musicians and performance artists used the space. Artists who exhibited work at Rifle Sport include Shannon Brady, Phillip Johnson, Michael Joo, Ross Knight, Jill Burchill, Ruthann Godollei, Jan Elftman, Frank Gaard, Melissa Stang, W. Joe Hoppe, Julia Scher, The Slime Clowns (Zingo & Bloppo), Venus de Mars, Mann Hawks, Robert Grassel, and Ken Avidor. Bands that performed at the gallery include The Slime Clowns, The Swabs, Ting Kong, Lies Inc., and Chris Strouth's King Paisley and The Pscho-del-ics.

The building that housed Rifle Sport was demolished with the rest of Block E in 1988, the victim of downtown redevelopment. The gallery lived on after the demolition, moving near Loring Park, but closed after a year. Its final show was a dual exhibition by artists Stuart Mead and Dean Lucker.

An unrelated local band, Rifle Sport, also named after the arcade, established their name before the gallery in 1981.

== Gallery ==
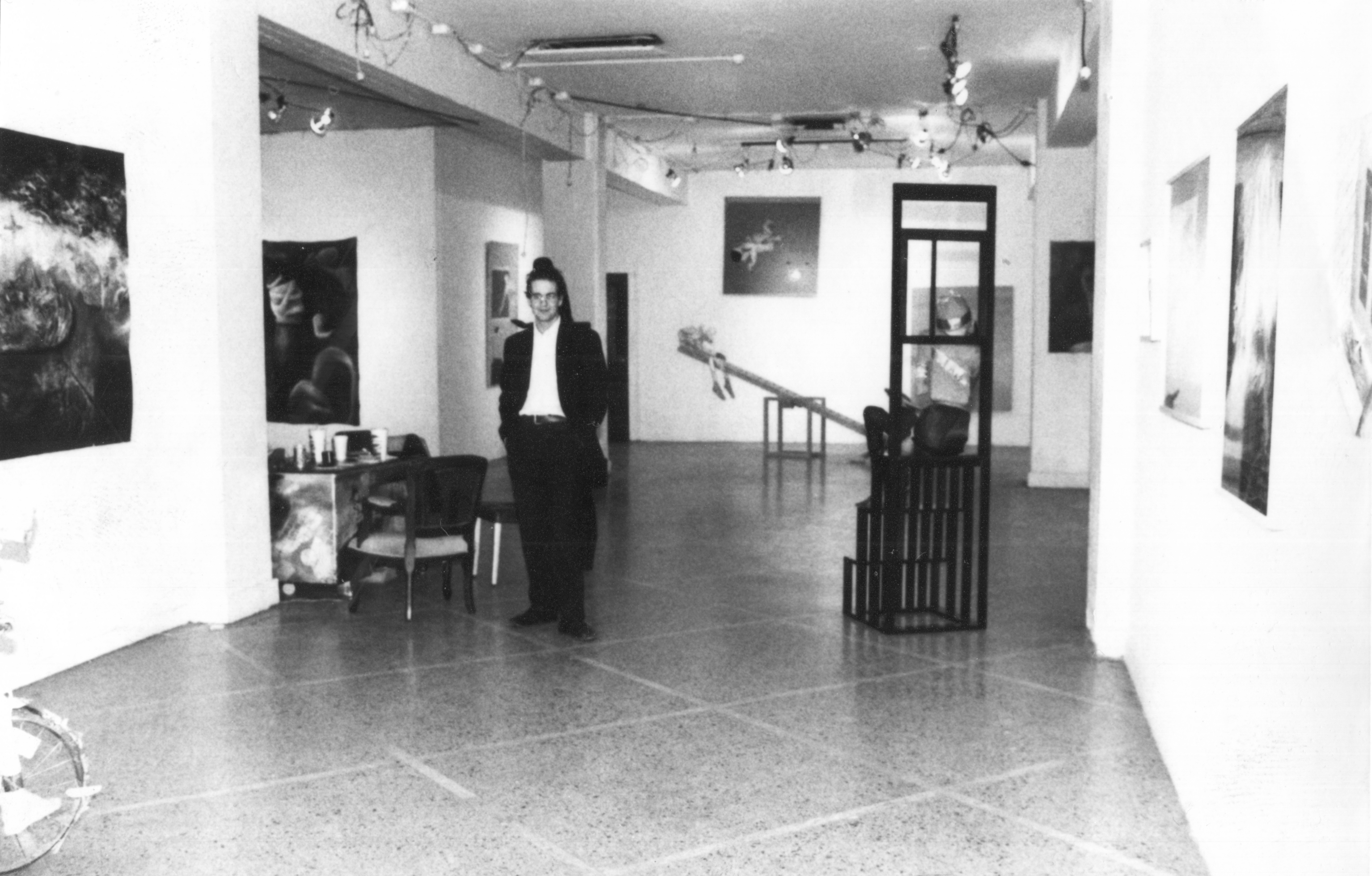

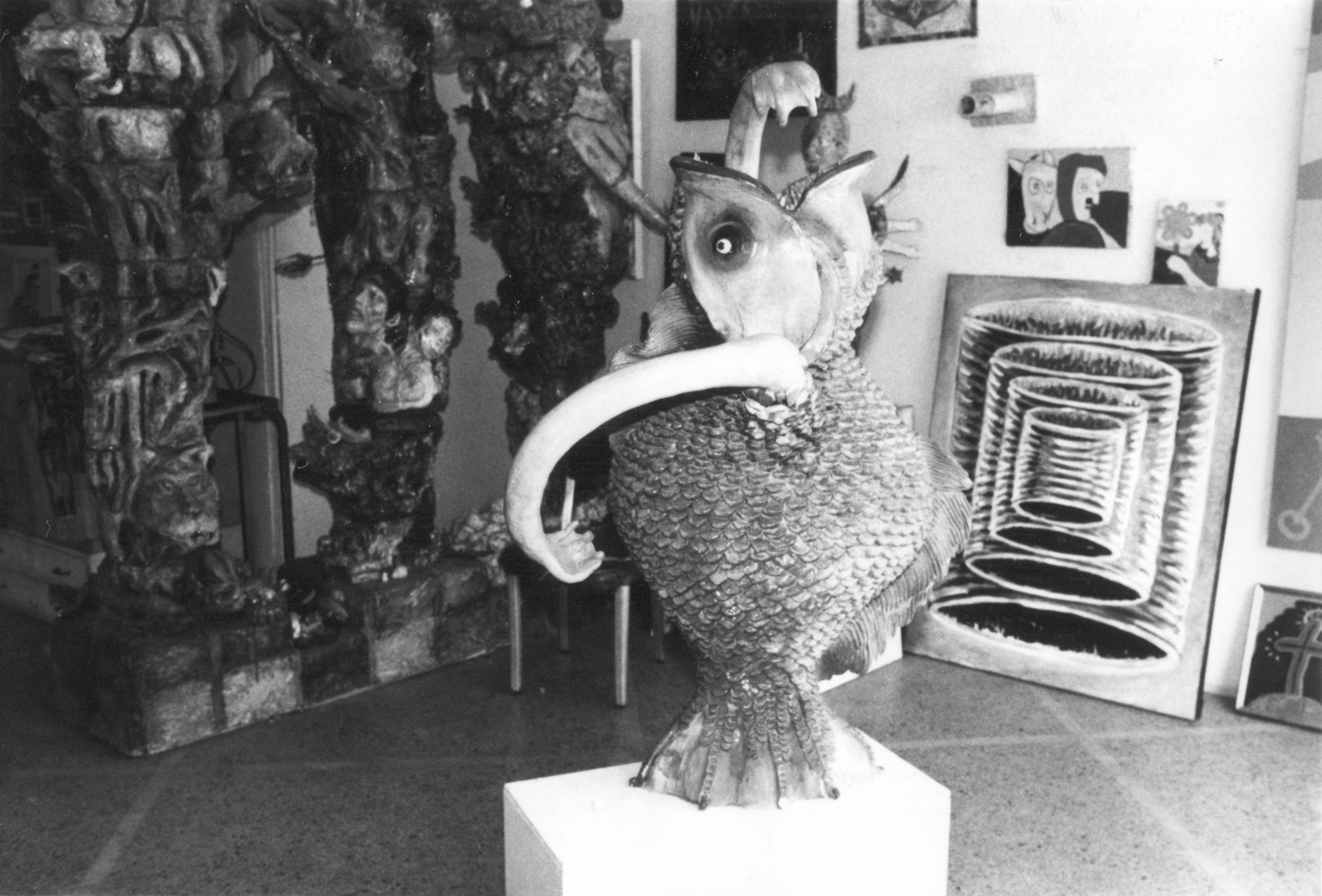

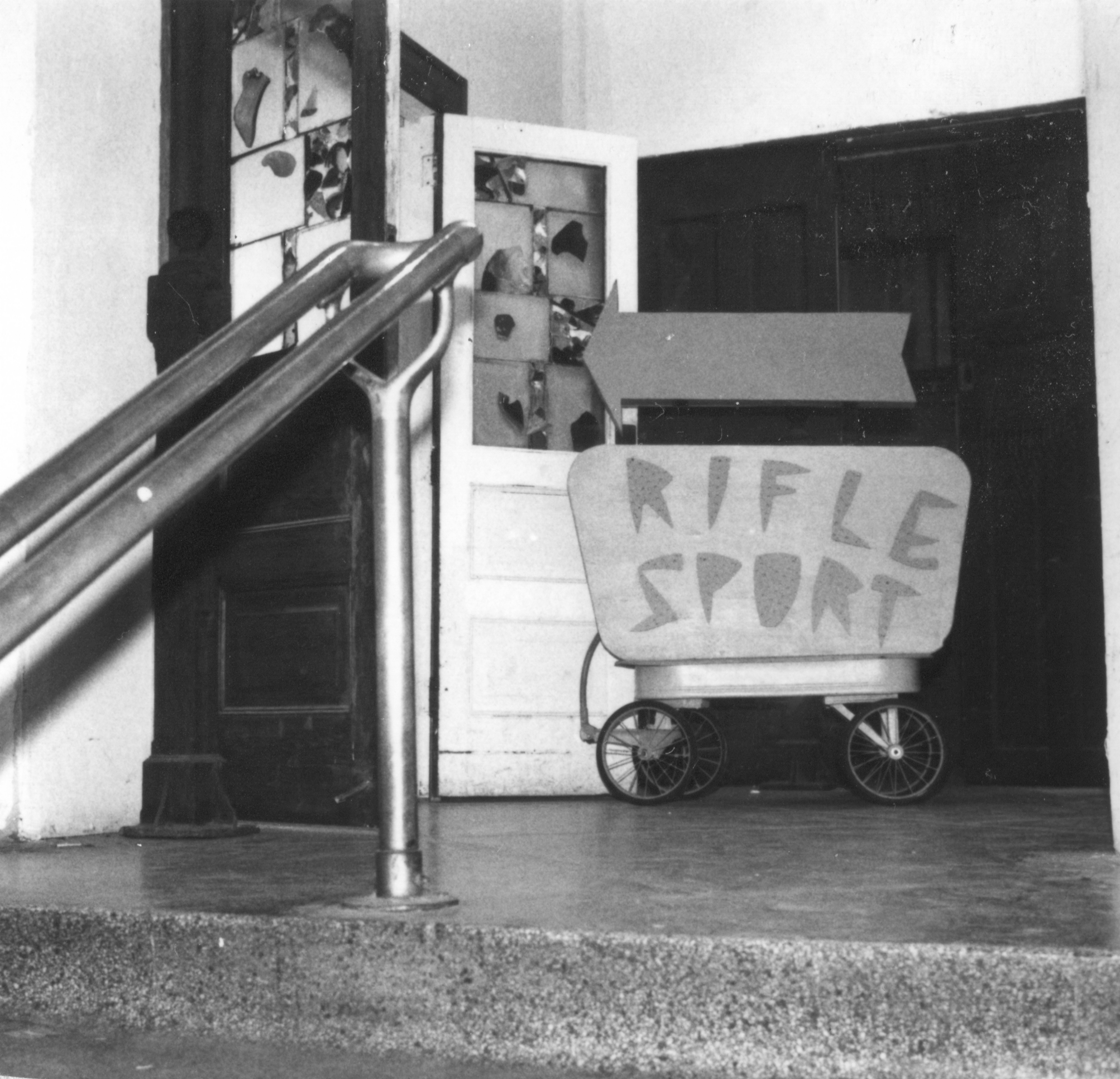
