= Victoria Jordanova =

- Born: 1952 (age 72–73)
- Occupation: Composer

Victoria Jordanova is an American composer, harpist, and media artist born in 1952 in former Yugoslavia, active in the field of contemporary classical music, experimental music and media arts. Her work encompasses contemporary classical composition, improvisation and electroacoustic music. According to New Music Box "Jordanova has a tightly controlled focus to her work, a singularity of vision, while melding experimental techniques, electronics and improvisation with her classical music education..."

Jordanova has released six albums on CRI, Innova and Arpaviva labels, and her music was included in "The Composer-Performer (Forty Years of Discovery)" the CRI anniversary anthology release of American music. Her first album "Requiem for Bosnia and other works" was selected as one of the top ten classical releases in 1994 by Tim Page (New York Newsday). In 2007 Jordanova published first recording ever of John Cage's "Postcard from Heaven" for 20 harps and 20 voices, all of the harp parts were recorded by Jordanova and all the voices by Pamela Z. In 2002 Jordanova founded Arpaviva Recordings, a Los Angeles-based independent music and media label.

Jordanova performed at Lincoln Center, Alice Tully Hall, Merkin Concert Hall, MOMA, LACMA, Yerba Buena Center for the Arts, and other venues nationally and internationally. Her compositions were performed/presented by the California EAR Unit, Bang on a Can All Stars, San Francisco Contemporary Music Players, San Francisco Creative Voices, Zeitgeist, pianists Jenny Q. Chai, Anthony DeMare, Michiko Saiki, percussionist Amy Knoles, oboist Libby Van Cleve, flutist Patricia Kaczmarczyk.
