= Unconvention: A Mix-Tape from St. Paul, RNC '08 =

2009 film by Chris Strouth

- Directed by: Chris Strouth
- Produced by: Chris Strouth, Dan Jagunich, Joan Sekler, Steve Dietz, Alek Roslik
- Starring: Joel Edwards (narration)
- Edited by: Dylan Thies
- Distributed by: Alternavision Films
- Release date: April 26, 2009 (Minneapolis–Saint Paul International Film Festival)
- Running time: 126 min.
- Language: English

Unconvention: A Mix-Tape from St. Paul, RNC '08 is a documentary directed by Minneapolis artist Chris Strouth about the 2008 Republican National Convention in St. Paul, Minnesota. The film edits together a wide variety of film and video shot by dozens of independent journalists and citizen videographers with divergent political viewpoints, compiling a mosaic of perspectives on the four days of the convention. It was produced by Alternavision Films, a California production company specializing in political documentaries. Unconvention was one of eight full-length features chosen to debut as part of the "Minnesota Made" series at the 2009 Minneapolis–Saint Paul International Film Festival.

== Critical reception ==
While the film was not widely distributed, it received accolades from several critics. The Minnesota Daily's Tony Libera called it "an engaging, at times terrifying, record" of the events surrounding the RNC. Peter S. Scholtes of City Pages said, "Whenever it opens, you must see Unconvention," adding that "the movie feels raw, unprocessed, and complex—with an eye toward every possible irony."
