= Rosy Simas =

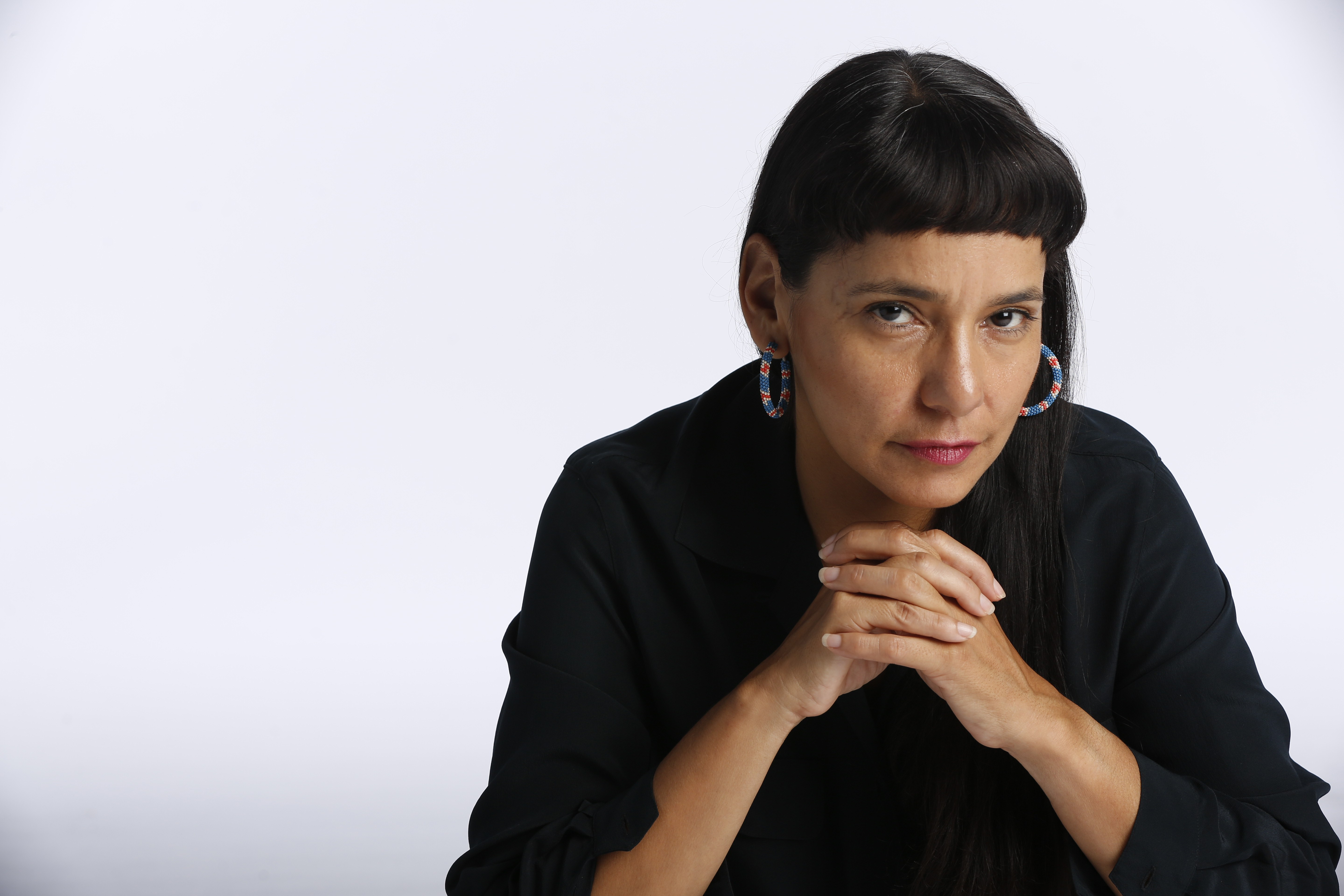
- Rosy Simas by Tim Rummelhoff Courtesy McKnight Fellowships for Choreographers, 2016
- Born: Rosy Simas; April 4, 1967 (age 59); Jacksonville, Florida
- Occupations: transdisiplinary artist, choreographer, performer, artistic director
- Years active: 1992-present
- Career
- Current group: Rosy Simas Danse
- Former groups: Shattering Feet
- Dances: she who lives on the road to war, yödoishëndahgwa’geh (a place for rest), WEave:Here, Weave, Within Our Skin, Transfuse, Skin(s), We Wait In The Darkness, Bloodlines, Threshold, i want it to be raining and the window to be open, Birds, Have Gun Will Shoot, Moments In Between, Four Years Later
- Website: www.rosysimas.com

Rosy Marie Simas is a Seneca multidisciplinary artist and choreographer in the United States.

== Identity ==
Rosy Simas is Haudenosaunee Heron Clan and an enrolled member of the Seneca Nation of Indians.

== Career ==
Simas is a dance and transdisciplinary artist and the founder and artistic director of Rosy Simas Danse.

As a choreographer, Simas creates work for stage and installation that unifies movement, time-based media, sound, and sculpture. Since 2012 she has collaborated with French composer François Richomme. Their collaborative works include: We Wait In The Darkness (2014); Skin(s) (2012); Weave (2019); Threshold, a film with photographer Douglas Beasley (2013); and WEave:HERE with Heid E. Erdrich (2019).

In addition, Simas has collaborated with Deborah Jinza Thayer. In 2016, Simas and Jinza Thayer performed together in 14 U.S. cities, and finished their tour with a performance at Carleton College in Northfield, Minnesota.

== Exhibitions ==
=== Solo ===
- We Wait In The Darkness, All My Relations Art, Minneapolis, MN. (2014)
- All My Relations: A Seneca History, Mitchell Museum of the American Indian (2015)
- Blood Lines: Images of Attachments, Seneca Iroquois National Museum, Salamanca, NY. (2020)
- she who lives on the road to war, Weisman Art Museum, Minneapolis, MN. (2020)

=== Group ===
- SKEW LINES: a residency and installations, Heid E. Erdrich and Rosy Simas. SOO Visual Arts Center, Minneapolis, MN. (2019)
- Waasamoo-Beshizi (Power-Lines), Plains Art Museum, Fargo, ND. (2019)
- Identity/Identify, Iroquois Indian Museum, Howes Cave, NY. (2020–2021)

== Honors and awards ==
- Native Arts and Cultures Foundation Artist Fellowship (2013)
- Twin Cities City Pages Artist of the Year (2014)
- Sage Award for Film and Set Design (2014)
- Guggenheim Creative Arts Fellowship for Choreography (2015)
- McKnight Fellowship for Choreography (2016)
- First People's Fund Artists in Business Leadership Fellow (2016)
- Joyce Award from the Joyce Foundation with the Ordway Center of the Performing Arts (2018)
- Dance/USA Artist Fellowships (2019)
- Twin Cities City Pages Best Choreographer (2020)
- McKnight Fellowship for Choreography (2022)
- United States Artists Artist Fellowship (2022)
- Doris Duke Artist Award (2023)
- Forge Project Fellowship (2025)
- First People’s Fund Performing Arts Fellowship (2025)

== Publications ==
- Simas, Rosy (2016). "My Making of We Wait in the Darkness". Dance Research Journal. 48 (1): 29–32. doi:10.1017/S0149767716000073. S2CID 192540281. Project MUSE 617347.
- Simas, Rosy and Bodhrán, Ahimsa Timoteo (2019) Sovereign Movements Building and Sustaining Native Dance And Performance Communities A Dialogue, Movement Research Performance Journal, Sovereign Movements: Native Dance and Performance, Issue 52/53, Fall 2019.
- Simas, Rosy and Morgan, Christopher K. (2019) Longer Scores: Native Choreographic Turns, Curatorial Visions, and Community Engagement
- Simas, Rosy; Mitchell, Sam Aros (October 2019). "Playing Indian, between Idealization and Vilification: Seems You have to Play Indian to be Indian". American Indian Culture and Research Journal. 43 (4): 133–140. doi:10.17953/aicrj.43.4.simas-mitchell. S2CID 242885536.
- Simas, Rosy (2022) "The body is an archive: Collective memory; ancestral knowledge, culture and history". in Music, Dance and the Archive. Edited by Amanda Harris, Linda Barwick, and Jakelin Troy
