= Ronnie Dawson (musician) =

American singer, guitarist and drummer

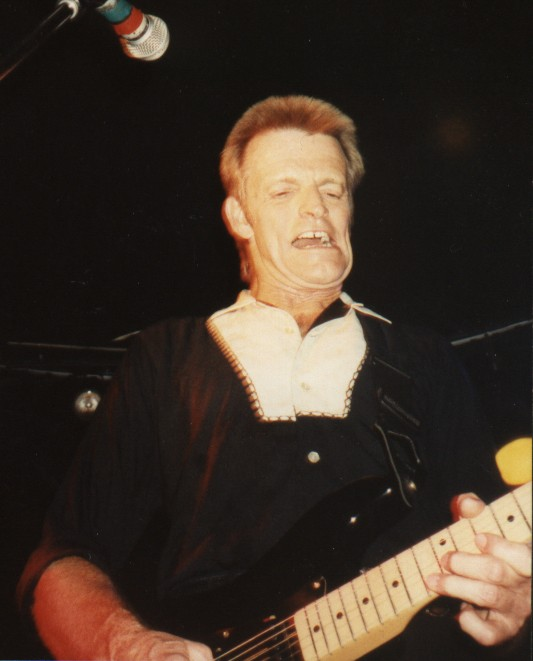

Background information
- Birth name: Ronald Monroe Dawson
- Born: August 11, 1939; Dallas, Texas
- Died: September 30, 2003 (aged 64); Dallas, Texas
- Genres: Rock and roll, rockabilly, pop
- Occupation(s): Singer, guitarist
- Years active: 1959–2002
- Website: http://www.ronniedawson.com/

Ronald Monroe Dawson (11 August 1939 – 30 September 2003) was an American rockabilly singer, guitarist and drummer, nicknamed The Blond Bomber. Although he achieved regional success in the 1950s, his popularity peaked internationally with tours in the 1980s and 1990s.

== Early life ==
Born Ronald Monroe Dawson in Dallas, Texas, his father Pinkie Dawson was the leader of a western swing band, the Manhattan Merrymakers. The family moved to Waxahachie. He learned to play guitar, bass and drums. He attended the Southern Bible Institute in Waxahachie before he was expelled. Dawson listened to rock and roll music and entered a local talent contest run by the Future Farmers of America, which he ended up winning.

== Career ==
He formed his first band, Ronnie Dee & the D-Men, in 1956, and appeared regularly on the Big D Jamboree radio show in Dallas. The group's first record, a version of Jack Rhodes' song "Action Packed" which had previously been recorded by Johnny Dollar, was issued in late 1958 on the Back Beat label. Dawson's voice gave the impression that he was several years younger than his actual age, and although he toured nationally with Gene Vincent and appeared on TV, the record gained no more than regional airplay. His second record, "Rockin' Bones", credited to Ronnie Dawson "The Blond Bomber", was released in 1959, and again failed to chart. He performed with the well-established western swing group the Light Crust Doughboys for a time between 1957 and 1960 – releasing one single with the group and harmonica player Delbert McClinton, which was credited to Johnny & the Jills – before signing as a solo singer with Dick Clark's Swan label. Clark attempted to package him as a teen idol and he appeared on American Bandstand shortly before the payola scandal broke. Although his pop singles "Hazel" and "Summer's Comin'" achieved some popularity in Pittsburgh, Dawson later disowned the records.

Dawson returned to Texas, and worked as a session guitarist and drummer on Major Bill Smith's productions, including Bruce Channel's "Hey! Baby" and Paul and Paula's "Hey Paula". He also recorded unsuccessful singles under his own name and as Commonwealth Jones. In the mid-1960s he joined a folk music-based vocal group, the Levee Singers, who recorded three LPs featuring Dawson in the 1960s, and appeared on several networked TV shows. He left the group at the end of the 1960s, and formed country rock band Steel Rail, who performed in Texas clubs throughout the 1970s. Dawson also recorded jingles and commercials for various products and radio stations in the region.

In the 1980s, a resurgence of interest in rockabilly music, especially in England and through the revivalist recordings of the Cramps, whose recordings included "Rockin' Bones", led Dawson to tour Britain for the first time in 1986. Many of his old recordings were also reissued on CD at that time. He recorded new material, released through the Crystal Clear label. He recorded albums for the Upstart and Yep Roc labels in the 1990s, including More Bad Habits. Still based in Dallas, he toured widely in Europe and in the US, and several of his earlier recordings were included in movies. Dawson invited Minneapolis rockabilly group The Vibro Champs to be his live backing band for his 1995 tour.

Dawson was inducted into the Rockabilly Hall of Fame in 1998.

Dawson continued to perform after developing throat cancer, but died in Dallas at the age of 64 on September 30, 2003.
