= More Bad Habits =

Studio album by Ronnie Dawson
- Released: 1999
- Recorded: October 1998
- Genre: Rock and roll, rockabilly, country rock
- Label: Yep Roc

Ronnie Dawson chronology
Live at the Continental Club (1998)	More Bad Habits (1999)	The Carnegie Hall Tour (2012)

More Bad Habits is an album by the American musician Ronnie Dawson, released in 1999. His first studio album in decades to be recorded in the United States, it was regarded as a comeback. Dawson preferred to think of his music as rock and roll, claiming that "rockabilly" was a term used by non-musicians.

== Production ==
More Bad Habits was Dawson's first album to be recorded in stereo. Some of the lyrics to its songs were supplied by a fan, from topics suggested by Dawson; he decided to fill the album with humorous songs. The cover photo was taken at the Sons of Hermann Hall, in Dallas.

"The Frim Fram Sauce" is a cover of the song made popular by Nat King Cole. The sound of "Chili Pepper Mama" was inspired by playing—and listening to—music at the New Orleans Jazz & Heritage Festival.

== Critical reception ==
Professional ratings
Review scores
Source	Rating
AllMusic	4/5 stars
The San Diego Union-Tribune	3/4 stars

The Star Tribune wrote that Dawson's "happy fury comes through on new tracks like 'Mac Attack', 'Party Slab', 'Bobwire Betty', plus a swamp-rockin' rendition of ... 'The Frim Fram Sauce'." Exclaim! called the album "pure Stratocaster-driven country rock." NPR thought that it "showcases his talent as a composer and arranger ... and he plays a mean guitar." The State deemed it "dangerous, bar-brawling music that spews fire and just won't quit."

The Dallas Observer labeled "Party Slab" "nasty jungle rock, loads of chugga-chugga guitar drunk on Thunderbird and hoochie-coochie rhythms." The San Diego Union-Tribune stated that "there's plenty of rockabilly silliness and retro-bopping to keep things hopping here." The Fort Worth Star-Telegram opined that "Dawson sounds ageless and superbly confident," and described the album as "slap-back bass, that distinctive lived-in voice, tough guitar, and a passel of fun songs."

AllMusic wrote that the songs "address rebel concerns in an age of political correctness, seeing life for what it is while defiantly refusing to equate getting older with getting old ... his material has never been better."

== Track listing ==
No.	Title	Length
1.	"Good at Being Bad"
2.	"Mac Attack"
3.	"Toe Up from the Flo Up"
4.	"Waxahachie Drag Race"
5.	"Bobwire Betty"
6.	"Chili Pepper Mama"
7.	"Bad Habit or Two"
8.	"Rockin' Country Cat"
9.	"Rockin' Calaveras"
10.	"Rippin' and a Roarin'"
11.	"Bayou Beauty"
12.	"The Frim Fram Sauce"
13.	"Party Slab"
