= BodyCartography Project =

Dance performance duo

BodyCartography Project is a dance performance duo composed of Olive Bieringa and Otto Ramstad. Their work is influenced by their studies in dance, performance, film and Body-Mind Centering®, a somatic movement approach. The pair have been collaborating since 1998. creating performance works for different contexts, public spaces, theaters and museums, stage productions, film, and installations. BodyCartography Project cultivates approaches and tools with somatics, dance, and choreography to support our collective evolution in this moment of planetary crisis. BodyCartography Project engages with the vital materiality of bodies, minds, and the more than human world, to co-create live experiences to generate re-enchantment, relationship, and presence.

== History ==
Olive Bieringa, originally from New Zealand, studied dance at European Dance Development Center in the Netherlands. She went to the US to study with Lisa Nelson and Bonnie Bainbridge Cohen. Otto Ramstad grew up in Minneapolis, Minnesota and began studying with Suzanne River, when he was seven years old. Bieringa and Ramstad started to work together in 1998 in San Francisco. They moved to Minneapolis in 2001.In 2017 They moved to Oslo, Norway in 2017 where they are currently based.

In 2001 and again in 2002 and 2003, Body Cartography Project participated in the New Zealand Fringe Festival, winning the Outdoor Award each year and the Pelorous Trust Creativity Award in 2003. The pair were well received at the Kerry Film Festival in Ireland in 2004.

In 2005, BodyCartography Project won the Dance for Camera prize at the American Dance Festival. In 2006 and 2008 they won the Minnesota Sage Award for Outstanding Performance.

They were presented with a Brooklyn Arts Exchange Passing It On Award in 2006, and became Public Art St. Paul Sustainable Arts Fellows in 2007. City Pages named them Artists of the Year in 2007, and they won a McKnight Fellowship for Choreographers in 2010.

In 2012, they presented Super Nature at the Walker Art Center, with music by Zeena Parkins.

Super Nature was performed at American Realness Festival in 2013, receiving a positive review from the New York Times. They also performed at the newMoves Contemporary Dance Festival in 2015. They were named the area's best dance company of the year by City Pages.

In 2015, they received a grant from the Foundation for Contemporary Art. They presented "closer" in various venues in the Twin Cities, beginning as a series of one-on-one dances and winding up with a full-length production at the Red Eye Theater. They also sold these one-on-one performances at the Walker Art Center Shop as part of the Intangibles Collection.

There recent work includes Resisting Extinction, Lineage, a collection of fluid spaces and Circling the Line.
