= Let's Bowl =

- Genre: Game show
- Created by: Tim Scott
- Developed by: Tim Scott; Rick Kronfeld
- Written by: Tim Scott; Ken Bradley
- Directed by: Harry E. Nelson
- Presented by: Rich Kronfeld; Steve Sedahl
- Starring: Amanda Brewer; Lisa Bartholomew; Matt Sarazine
- Narrated by: Drew Jansen
- Ending theme: "Let's Go Bowling"
- Country of origin: United States
- Original language: English
- No. of seasons: 1
- No. of episodes: 20

Production
- Executive producers: Tim Scott; Rick Kronfeld
- Producer: Danny Breen
- Editors: Ken Gammell; Craig Gooder; Noah Rosenstein; Eric Notti
- Running time: 30 minutes
- Production companies: The Scott-Kronfeld Experience; Comedy Partners

Original release
- Network: Comedy Central
- Release: August 19, 2001 – May 5, 2002

Let's Bowl is a scripted bowling game show that aired on the Comedy Central television network from 2001 to 2002 after a brief run on several TV stations across the U.S. in the mid-1990s, the first three being Minneapolis-St. Paul stations: KXLI-TV 41 (Now KPXM-TV), KLGT-TV 23 (now WUCW), and KARE channel 11.

== Overview ==
Hosts Steve "Chopper" Sedahl (himself) and Wally Hotvedt (Rich Kronfeld) wore outfits and headsets reminiscent of sportscasters of the 1970s and early 1980s, and did play-by-play as contestants bowled against each other. Described as a cross between The People's Court and Bowling for Dollars, the show had participants play against each other to settle feuds and win nearly worthless prizes. For example, in the second 1998 episode, a player received merchandise for a radio station that had been defunct for two years. Gift certificates for Old Country Buffet were common that year. Another episode gave a foodservice-sized can of tuna to the runner up, while the winner received a 2 1/2 gallon consumer-strength jug of Roundup.

Two women known as the "Queen Pins" were on each show — while women are often used to provide visual stimuli in TV programs, these two acted differently, usually taunting the contestants as they tried to compete. Drew Jansen played unctuous Announcer/Musical Commentator Ernie Jansen (aka "Trip Stuyvesant" in the original pre-cable pilot). The pre-cable pilot was shot at Bryant-Lake Bowl in Minneapolis, and featured yet another host, played by John Brady. Brady's name in the pilot was "Ernie," but that name was transferred to Jansen when shooting resumed, primarily because the polyester jacket Brady sported with "Ernie" stitched on the lapel fit Jansen pretty much as well as it had Brady.

Another character in the show was "The Pig" played by Matt Sarazine. The original shows, pre-Comedy Central also featured "Butch the Janitor", played by Nick Schenk, and "Berni the Scorekeeper", played by Berni Sarazine. Schenk went on to become one of the writers for the Comedy Central episodes of Let's Bowl and also wrote the screenplay for the film Gran Torino.

The show also included a halftime performance by a local musical band, most notably Ruth Adams and the World's Most Dangerous Polka Band, a fixture from northeast Minneapolis. It would be followed by a special "Inside Bowling" segment where Chopper and Wally interviewed unusual people and participated in bizarre escapades. Michael J. Nelson of Mystery Science Theater 3000 (also produced locally in the Twin Cities) fame was one of the writers for the show, both in 1998 and during the run on Comedy Central (though possibly only for the pilot).

The series was filmed in several different bowling alleys in the Twin Cities. Outside of the region, the 1998 season was carried on stations in markets such as Reno, Nevada; Madison, Wisconsin; and Chicago, Illinois.

=== Bowling centers used ===
- Bryant-Lake Bowl, Minneapolis, Minnesota
- Chanhassen Lanes, Chanhassen, Minnesota (Closed)
- Stardust Lanes (now Memory Lanes), Minneapolis, Minnesota (interior used for some Comedy Central pilot shows, exterior seen at beginning of all Comedy Central shows)
- Wallaby's Lanes, Columbia Heights, Minnesota (Closed)
- Wells Lanes (now Concord Lanes), South St. Paul, Minnesota
- White Bear Bowl, White Bear Lake, Minnesota (Closed)

=== Bands showcased ===
- Man or Astro-man?
- The Blue Up?
- Soul Asylum
- Manplanet
- Ruth Adams and the World's Most Dangerous Polka Band
- Trailer Trash
- House of Large Sizes
- Detroit (no relation to Mitch Ryder's band from the 1970s)
- The Dust Bunnies
- Jack Knife and the Sharps
- Flipp
- The Vibro Champs
- The Joint Chiefs
- The Senders
- Tina and the B-Sides
- The Mouldy Figs
- Martini & Olive
- James "Cornbread" Harris
