= Mayo Clinic Square =

Building in Minneapolis, Minnesota, United States

Coordinates: 44°58′43″N 93°16′29″W

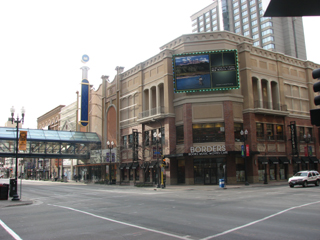
Block E at 6th Street and Hennepin Avenue, Minneapolis, Minnesota, USA.

Mayo Clinic Square on Block E in downtown Minneapolis, is a building bounded by Hennepin Avenue, North 6th Street, North 7th Street, and 1st Avenue North. It is part of the Downtown West neighborhood in Minneapolis, historically known as the Warehouse District. It is one block south of the Warehouse District/Hennepin Avenue light rail station on the METRO Blue and Green lines. "Block E" is a City planning department designation of the block; other blocks have similar designations ("Block F," for example, is the adjacent block on which First Avenue and the Pantages Theatre sit.)

Block E has a long history which includes theaters, bars, retail, and restaurants. Currently, it is home to basketball practice facilities and front offices of both the Minnesota Timberwolves of the NBA and Minnesota Lynx of the WNBA. Mayo Clinic Square is connected to Target Center via the Minneapolis Skyway System. The building also contains a Mayo Clinic sports medicine facility, which is open to the public. The street-level redevelopment has been spearheaded with the new restaurant City Works.

== 1850–1950 ==
In its early days, Block E contained mansions and row houses. The mansions on Hennepin between 6th and 7th Streets were gone at least by 1908 when the block acquired its row of small commercial buildings that remained largely unchanged into the late 1980s.

In the mid to late 19th century, the commercial and political hub of Minneapolis was Bridge Square, at the convergence of Hennepin and Nicollet Avenue, where most of the city's early commercial activity took place.

However, Bridge Square lost its status as the heart of Minneapolis by the turn of the 19th century as retail stores clustered on Nicollet Avenue for many blocks south of Washington Avenue. The Shubert Theater (later the Alvin — and the Academy after that) was built in 1910 on North 7th Street. The six-story Jeweler's Exchange Building went up next to the Shubert at the intersection of 1st Avenue North and North 7th Street in 1913.

The block grew with buildings constructed at the beginning of the 1900s; arcades, pool halls, ice cream stores, credit agencies, a grocer (Great Northern Market), bars, restaurants and theaters were among the many businesses. A notable venue, the 620 Club, operated at 620 Hennepin from 1934 to 1971. Renowned for its roasted turkey, the 620 Club billed itself as "Where Turkey Is King" and was owned by Ernie Fliegel and Max Winter. Fliegel and Winter were friendly with a number of pro athletes who would visit the restaurant and cocktail lounge throughout the 1940s, 1950s and 1960s; during this period Winter and associates brought major league basketball and football to the city as co-founders of the Minneapolis Lakers (Fliegel was a silent partner) in 1947 and the Minnesota Vikings in 1960.

== 1950–1988 ==
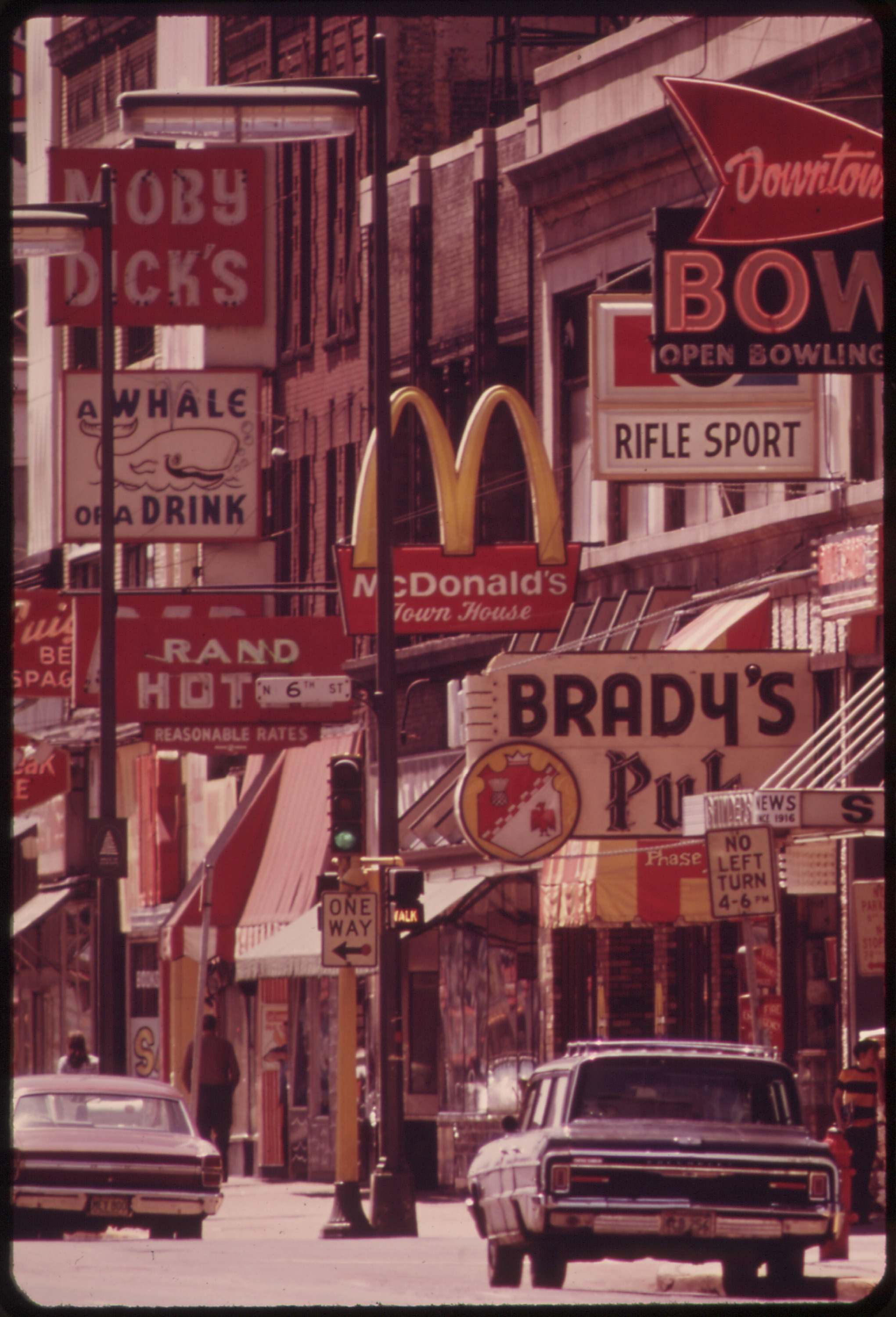
Looking SW on Hennepin, toward 7th St. in 1973

After 1950, as the rest of downtown gentrified, especially as the part of the Gateway District east of Hennepin was demolished and replaced with modern structures and parking lots late in the decade, lower Hennepin Avenue and Washington Avenue South became known as a place for drunks, crime, and prostitution. While Block E was not the center of the squalor it was only a few blocks away and over time it became the poster child area for downtown's uglier side. The 620 Club in 1971 gave way to Moby Dick's, which became known as one of the city's most seedy bars. Unsavory establishments, including rough bars, flophouses, and adult movie theaters settled in on Block E in the 1970s and 1980s. The opposite side of Hennepin deteriorated during this period as well, with the Aster and Gopher Theaters — screens that for decades had booked mainstream fare (the Gopher had the downtown showing of "Jaws" in 1975) — switching to adult films. In the 1970s, Block E's Hennepin face was anchored at each end by a Shinder's news vendor; Shinder's began at the 6th Street corner in 1916 and later split into two companies, framing the block as bookends might at opposite corners.

By the 1980s, the block was one of the choice places in Minneapolis for punks to hang out and it became a creative breeding ground for the local punk music scene, in part due to the presence of a record store beginning in the mid-1970s (Wax Museum, then Hot Licks, then Northern Lights). Block E was also known for its cheap rent, drawing such establishments as Rifle Sport Gallery. From the mid-1980s forward, the Minneapolis police had a constant presence in the area; it was normal to see squad cars or a police van parked between the northbound traffic lanes and contraflow bus lane.

Other establishments on Block E during the 1950s, '60s, '70s and '80s included (but not limited to) the Rand Hotel, Brady's Pub, Musicland, the Venice Cafe, La Casa Coronado restaurant, the Bottle Shop liquor store, Great Northern Market, Luigi's restaurant, National Beauty Supply, Best Steak House, Hollywood Beauty School, Sun's, Phase I, Dun-Rite Cleaners, Lee's Restaurant, Northside Bakery, Egekvist Bakery, Josid Hardware, Asuka restaurant, Gary's Coney Island, the Academy Theater (previously the Shubert and the Alvin), the World Theater, The Jewelry Exchange Building (in which the Loop Station of the U.S. Post Office was located), and a McDonald's "Town House" restaurant franchised by McTeufel Inc.

A three-second shot of the Shubert/Alvin/Academy and World Theaters can be seen in 1984's Purple Rain. The Shubert is the only surviving structure of Block E, but not at its original location on North 7th Street, having been moved in 1999 to a new location a block north on Hennepin Avenue. It is listed in the Guinness Book of World Records as the largest structure ever moved on rubber-wheeled dollies.

By 1987, the city council voted to demolish the entire Hennepin side of the block, giving tenants a limited amount of time to relocate. Moby Dick's and Rifle Sport Gallery did not survive the move, although the owner of Moby's briefly ran a bar called Melville's on Washington Avenue. The 7th Street Shinder's moved to a former Burger King at 8th and Hennepin, and the 6th Street Shinder's moved to the 900 block of Nicollet Mall. (By 2007, both locations had closed.) After a City-hosted party on Block E along Hennepin Avenue celebrating the impending demolition, crews began razing the structures on October 18, 1988.

Citizens who had enjoyed Block E and largely opposed the city's action also had a celebration. Called "The True Tribute and Farewell to Block E", the event was held at First Avenue and showcased photographs, films, and salvaged signage of the block.

== 1988–2001 ==
For over a decade, the Hennepin side of the block was a surface-level parking lot. In the mid-1990s, the Jewelers Exchange Building on 1st Avenue was also torn down. The only structures occupying the block were the Shubert Theater and an elevated billboard. The Shubert was moved a block north to a site adjacent to the Hennepin Center for the Arts by the Minnesota Shubert Performing Arts and Education Center in February 1999.

== 2001–2014 ==
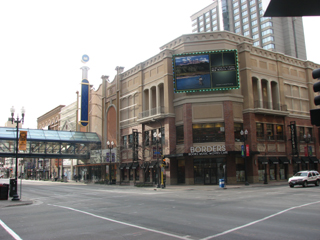
Block E in 2007

In 2001, the entire block became occupied by an enclosed retail and entertainment mall of the same name, Block E, which was developed by McCaffery Interests, a Chicago-based real estate developer. The mall housed businesses including Shout House Dueling Piano Bar, Applebee's restaurant, Hard Rock Cafe, and an AMC movie complex. The five-star, 22-story Graves 601 luxury hotel was built on a majority of the block's frontage on First Avenue. Additional restaurant and retail chains included Jimmy John's, Starbucks, Hooters, Cold Stone Creamery, and GameStop.

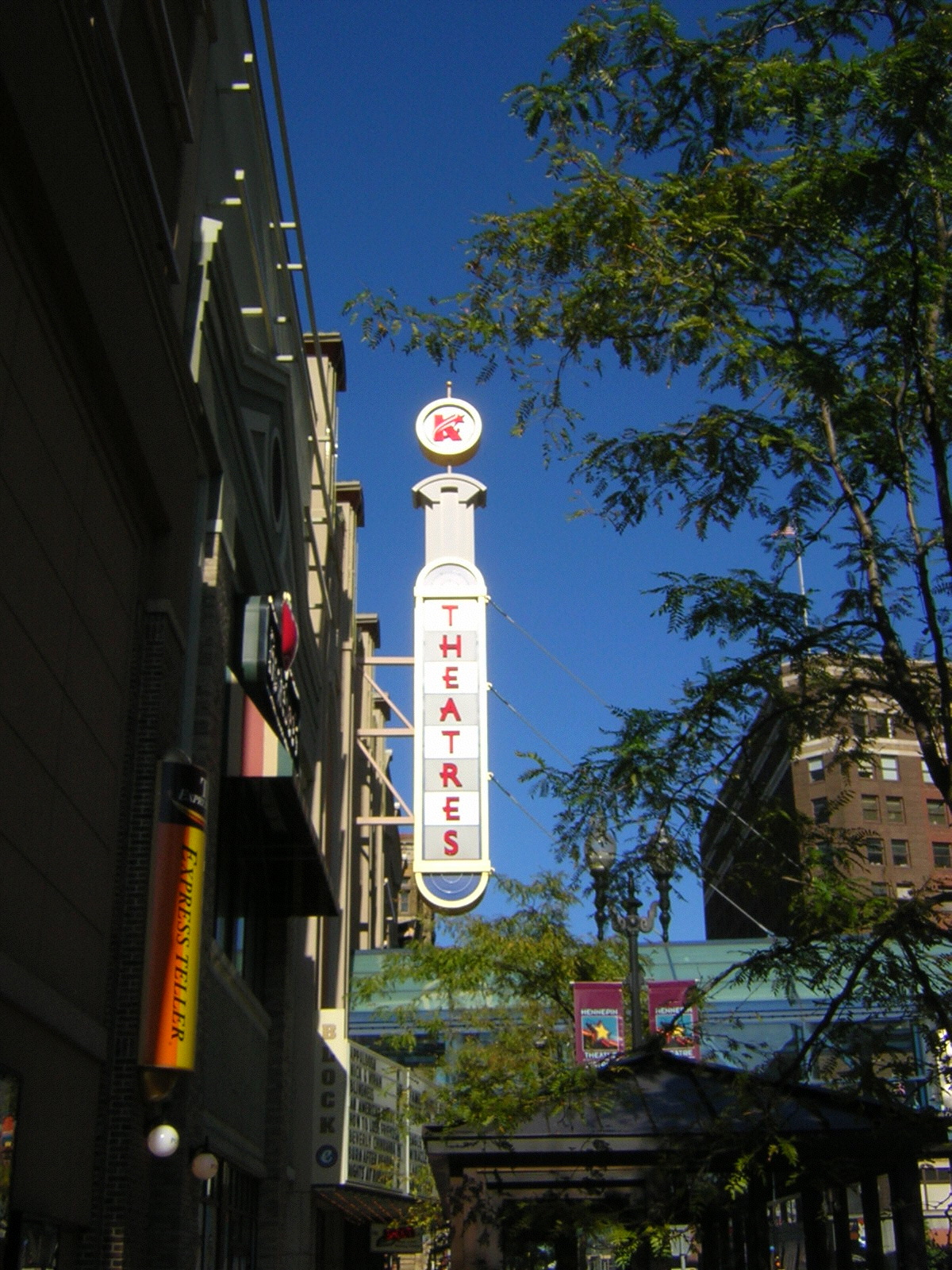
Kerasotes movie house on Hennepin Avenue

The new Block E was accessible from street level, and loosely modeled itself after buildings which previously existed on the site (specifically on Hennepin). The development also served as an important link in Minneapolis's skyway system, connecting Target Center to City Center.

Supporters of the project expected that the new Block E would bring back retail that has historically left Hennepin Avenue for other enclosed malls clustered on Nicollet Mall as well as in suburban malls. In re-establishing Hennepin Avenue as a theater district, the new Block E also attempted to promote itself as "Block Entertainment".

Snyder's Drugs, one of the original tenants, closed its location just barely a year after the complex opened. Borders, another original tenant, closed its Block E location on February 2, 2008. The Escape Ultra Lounge nightclub closed in July 2007. The upscale restaurant and nightclub Bellanote closed in July 2009.

According to a February 12, 2010, article in the Twin Cities Business Journal, the Block E Hooters restaurant owed more than $350,000 in rent, utilities, taxes and penalties. On August 24, 2010, the restaurant officially closed.

On March 16, 2010, Kieran's Irish Pub, established in 1994, took over the space previously occupied by Bellanotte. Owner Kieran Folliard signed a 10-year lease with the building that offered two five-year extension options.

Between 2010 and 2012, more tenants left. On March 30, 2010, GameWorks closed, and Applebee's shut down on March 13 the following year. On September 7, 2011, it was announced that the Hard Rock Cafe would close on September 30. The next year, the AMC Block E Theater 15 closed its doors.

A state run casino was proposed for Block E as a potential funding source for the planned U.S. Bank Stadium. Prior to the latest redevelopment effort, the unused sections of the development were supported by an artistic initiative by the Hennepin Theatre Trust titled "Made Here."

== 2014–present ==
On February 4, 2014, the Minnesota Timberwolves and Minnesota Lynx announced a partnership with the Mayo Clinic to change the name of the retail complex from "Block E" to "Mayo Clinic Square" and turn it into a practice facility, medical clinic and office complex. The renovations were reported to cost over $50 million.

On June 17, 2015, a grand opening event was held after months of renovations. The facility is home to the offices of the Minnesota Timberwolves and Minnesota Lynx basketball teams' offices and practice facilities, as well as the Mayo Sports Medicine Clinic. The basketball practice facilities have been described as "the gold standard" and "the most advanced in the NBA".

On March 9, 2016, a new 10,000-square-foot restaurant and pour house, City Works, was opened to the public, hoping to encourage further redevelopment and enterprise on the block. It was also announced that Jack Link's had signed a lease for office space and storefront in Mayo Clinic Square.
