= Venus de Mars =

American singer and songwriter

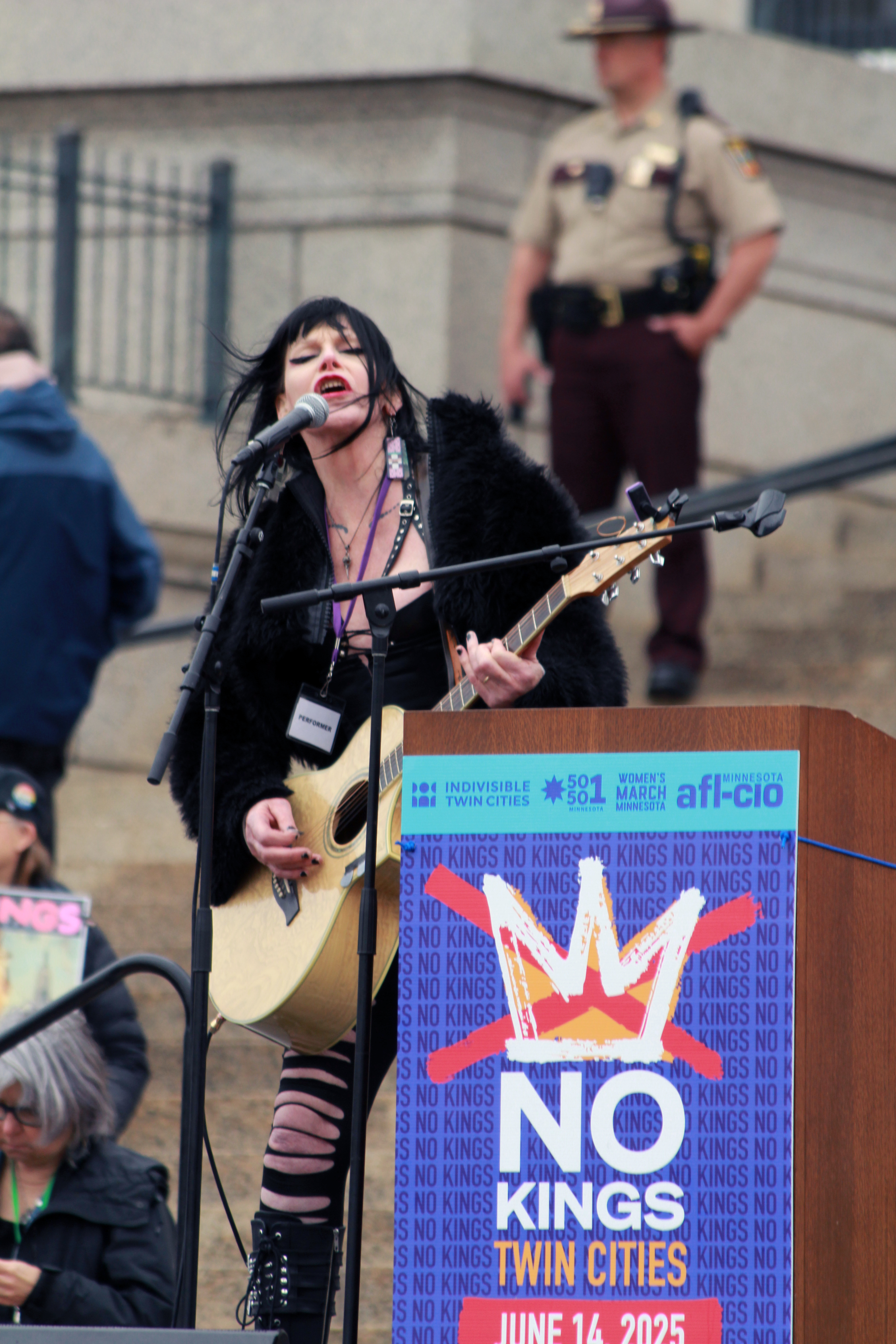
- Performing at the No Kings Rally, Minnesota State Capitol, June 14, 2025

Background information
- Born: January 11, 1960 (age 66); Duluth, Minnesota, US
- Occupations: Singer-songwriter, Record producer, Visual artist
- Instruments: Vocals, guitar, bass
- Years active: 1984–present
- Website: www.venusdemars.com

Venus de Mars (born January 11, 1960) is an American musician, visual artist, and performer based in Minnesota. She fronts the glam-punk band All the Pretty Horses, which she founded in 1993. de Mars identifies as transgender and came out publicly in 1988. Her work addresses punk music, trans identity, and performance art in the Minneapolis scene. Venus de Mars is notable as one of the first openly transgender people in the DIY punk scene.

== Early life ==
Venus de Mars grew up in Duluth, Minnesota. She married Lynette Reini-Grandell in 1983. de Mars came out as transgender in 1988 during therapy sessions.

== Career ==
de Mars entered performance art, painting, and installation in the late 1980s. For years she maintained the studio, SkinDog Productions in the North Loop Warehouse District neighborhood of Minneapolis. She formed All the Pretty Horses in 1993 after reconnecting with a former drummer. The band celebrated its 30-year anniversary in 2023.

She fought a prolonged state tax audit from 2012 to 2014 over artist deductions and ultimately won a refund but costing her more than $12,000 in legal fees. Minnesota initially denied her deductions for paint, makeup, clothing, and equipment as business expenses. de Mars challenged the decision through appeals and legal representation. The state reversed its stance after review, granting her a refund plus interest. This victory highlighted struggles independent artists face with tax authorities and set a precedent for creative professionals claiming work-related costs. de Mars documented the two-year battle publicly to support fellow musicians.

=== Music ===
de Mars leads the band "All the Pretty Horses", known for glam-punk sound. She performs in fetish dom attire to assert full-time transgender identity on stage. The stage provides validation absent elsewhere. Fans include young transgender people. In 2014, All the Pretty Horses toured with Against Me!, also a trans-fronted band.

=== Visual Art ===
de Mars paints, crafts films, and creates immersive installations, including screen-printmaking, sculpture, and set design. de Mars exhibited at Rifle Sport Alternative Art Gallery in the 1980s and collaborated with Tim Miller at the Walker Art Center. She maintains a long-term installation, the "All The Pretty Horses Room," at the Carlton Arms Hotel in New York since 2002, featuring life-sized blue transgender-figures with wings and an octopus, painted with spouse Lynette Reini-Grandell.

== Personal life ==
de Mars and Reini-Grandell met as children in Duluth. Their marriage faced strains from de Mars's transition and band commitments. Reini-Grandell's memoir Wild Things: A Trans-Glam-Punk-Rock Love Story (2023) details their story from the 1980s. de Mars is working on her own memoir.

The 2003 documentary "Venus of Mars" (105 minutes), directed by Emily Goldberg, chronicles de Mars and Reini-Grandell's relationship-redefining journey through love and gender. The film follows their travels from Duluth to New York City and the UK, including stops at Playboy, a suburban metal bar, and public television, capturing divergent reactions to transness at the 20th century's close.

== Discography ==
Venus de Mars & All The Pretty Horses

- Animal Angst (the 1984 Grandell Master Tapes) (2023 - Released)
- ATPH (1995)
- Ruin (2000/2023 Remastered)
- Creature (2002/2023 Remastered)
- Dolls with Balls Live in the Warehouse (2002/2023 Remastered)
- 10 Bones (2011)
- I Think The Darkness (2022 - LP, Ltd)

Solo and Other Releases

- Trashed and Broken Hearted (2006 - Album)
- Take My Shoulder (feat. Laura Jane Grace) (2015 - Single)
- Flesh and Wire (2015 - Album)
- Even with Scars (2024 - Single)
