= Red Eye Theater =

Multidisciplinary creative laboratory for performance work

- Interactive map of Red Eye Theater
- Address: 2213 Snelling Ave; Minneapolis, MN 55408; United States
- Coordinates: 44°57′40″N 93°14′40″W

Construction
- Opened: 1983

Website
- redeyetheater.org

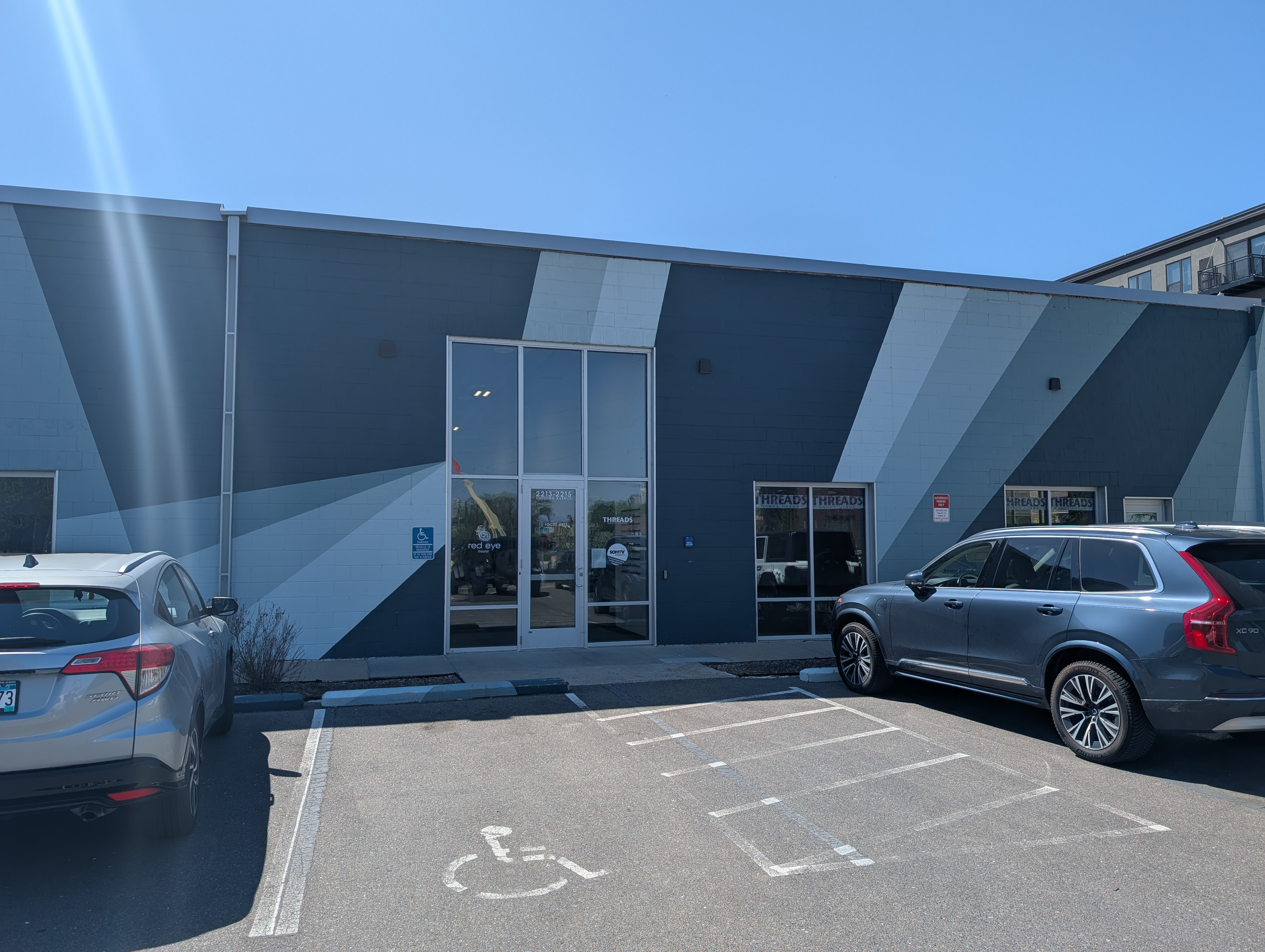
Red Eye Theater

Red Eye Theater (legal name Red Eye Collaboration) is a multidisciplinary creative laboratory dedicated to the development and presentation of boundary-breaking performance work in Minneapolis, Minnesota. It was founded in 1983 by writer/director Steve Busa, performer Miriam Must, and visual artist Barbara Abramson.

Branching out from a theatrical base to support a wide range of programming, Red Eye is home to theater, dance, music, performance art, and interdisciplinary forms. In addition to creating its own acclaimed multimedia theatrical productions, Red Eye functions as an incubator and producer of other artists' works. Red Eye's "New Works 4 Weeks Festival," the annual culminating public component of a six-month development program for emerging and mid-career artists, has been called "one of the most important platforms for new and experimental performance in Minnesota."

In October 2018, Red Eye lost its long-time Loring Park storefront space to gentrification. In 2019, Red Eye announced the retirement of its founding leaders and the appointment of seven new Artistic Directors to collectively guide the organization forward. Red Eye’s new Artistic Directors are Theo Langason, Hayley Finn, Jeffrey Wells, Valerie Oliveiro, Andrew Lee Dolan, and Emily Gastineau. Rachel Jendrzejewski also served until her death in 2025. All previously worked at Red Eye as independent artists.

In 2022, Red Eye relocated to a permanent facility as a part of the city's Seward Redesign's Seward Commons Project. At the new location Red Eye's first performance was streamed live for audiences on March 24, 2022.

Others of the hundreds of artists who have collaborated with or presented work at Red Eye include Lee Breuer, BodyCartography Project, Sheila Callaghan, Lisa D'Amour, Angharad Davies, Christina Ham, Jordan Harrison, Ann Marie Healy, HIJACK, Kim Hines, Julia Jarcho, Emily Johnson, Sibyl Kempson, Wendy Knox, Ruth Margraff, Megan Mayer, Neal Medlyn, Leslie Mohn, Kira Obolensky, Ashwini Ramaswamy, Rosy Simas, Karen Sherman, SuperGroup, Deborah Jinza Thayer, Morgan Thorson, Anne Washburn, and Marcus Young.

Red Eye has received major funding from the Jerome Foundation, McKnight Foundation, Target Corporation, Metropolitan Regional Arts Council, Minnesota State Arts Board, and National Endowment for the Arts, among others.
