= Ousia (band) =

Music ensemble from Minneapolis, Minnesota

Ousia is a music ensemble from Minneapolis, Minnesota. The group classifies their music (a mixture of ambient, noise, and space rock) as "Snowbient." Their current instrumentation consists of two guitars, bass, and synthesizers. Musically, their compositions are constructed around keys and dynamics, rather than a traditional "verse / bridge / chorus" musical form. A consistent approach involving improvisation and "live" recordings, minimizes the difference between their performances and CD releases. Ousia have performed with The Flaming Lips, Laibach, Third Eye Foundation, Windy and Carl, as well as headlining their own shows.

== Members ==
- Horn, Paul - Guitar, PolySix, QuasiMidi 309, Mini Analog Synth created by Paul
- Onnen, Dave - Bass
- Shapiro, Jason - Roland JP-8000, Roland MC-909, Symetrix 606, TC Electronic D-Two
- Teasley, Fred - Guitar, MS-20, Micromoog

== Biography ==
In February 1996, Jason Shapiro and Paul Horn collaborated on a primarily improvised performance for a showcase at Intermedia Arts in Minneapolis, Minnesota ("You're My Avant-Guitar Hero", February 23–24, 1996). Seven months later (September 1996), the two decided to record their "improvised compositions", in addition to writing new material. During this time, Horn was also working with Fred Teasley writing drone-oriented compositions. As the two separate projects were similar in nature, it was decided that the three should get together and compose new music. In late October 1996, the line up expanded with the addition of Dave Onnen, and the name "Blue Shift" was established by Teasley. Late November 1996 brought the addition of Jason Ducklinsky, as preparations were made for their first live performance a few weeks later. In March 1997, the ensemble were informed that there were at least two other bands performing as Blue Shift, and thus Shapiro suggested that their name be changed to "Ousia", inspired from Aristotle's Metaphysics. The change in the name also reflected an evolution in the structure—at the end of May 1997, Ousia trimmed down from a quintet to a quartet (Ducklinsky was no longer a member).

== Discography ==
- Various Artists, Southeast of Saturn, Vol. 2 (Third Man Records, Dec. 3, 2022)
- Various Artists, Redeyed: Minneapolis Shoegaze and Dreampop 1992-1998 (Go Johnny Go, 2006)
- Various Artists, FutureMusic CD #131 (Future Music UK Magazine, Jan. 2003)
- Ousia, Face the Robot (Mutant Music, 2002)
- Various Artists, Twin Town High Yearbook 1997-1998 (Pulse of the Twin Cities Newspaper, Jan. 1998)
- Various Artists, Future Perfect Sound System: Music For Listening (UltraModern/TRG, Oct. 21, 1997)
- Ousia, Why is That a Four? (UltraModern/TRG, Sept. 23, 1997)
- Various Artists, ADA Monthly Catalog Sampler, July '97 (Alternative Distribution Alliance, Jul. 1997)

== Selected awards ==
- Best Noise Band - Winner (City Pages, Minneapolis - May 13, 1998)
- Best Electronic Group/DJ of 1997 - Nominated (Minnesota Music Awards - April 23, 1998)
- Best Electronic Music CD of 1997 - Nominated (Minnesota Music Awards - April 23, 1998)
- "Picked to Click" (Best New Band Poll) - Top 10 (City Pages, Minneapolis - April 22, 1998)
