= Deborah Jinza Thayer =

American and Japanese dancer and choreographer

- Born: Deborah Jinza Thayer
- Occupation(s): choreographer, dancer, artistic director, somatic movement educator
- Years active: 1980s - Present
- Career
- Current group: Movement Architecture
- Website: movementarchitecture.com

Deborah Jinza Thayer is an American choreographer, dancer, and artistic director, located in Saint Paul, Minnesota.

== Early life ==
As an infant, Jinza Thayer lived in Japan and Southeast Asia. Her family moved to the United States, and she was raised in Brooklyn, New York.

She received her Bachelor of Arts degree from Johns Hopkins University and received her Master of Fine Arts degree in Dance from George Mason University.

== Career ==
Jinza Thayer presents her work as Movement Architecture, and serves as the company’s artistic director and primary choreographer.

Jinza Thayer is a registered Somatic Movement Therapist and Movement Educator (ISMETA) and maintains an individualized training practice in St. Paul. She also conducts group movement therapy workshops at Tofte Lake Center in Ely, Minnesota. For more than two decades, Jinza Thayer has been on the faculty of Zenon Dance Company and School (Minneapolis), where she teaches dance and movement.

In 2025, Jinza Thayer premiered the full-length performance of "From Tokyo to Brooklyn," an interactive dance installation that traveled through the backstage spaces of Northrop at the University of Minnesota. The piece was inspired by Jinza’s story of immigration and her desire to examine the swirling alchemy of physical and social forces that influence how we move through the world.

In 2024, Jinza Thayer was an artist-in-residence at Rosy Simas Danse. As part of her residency, she previewed “From Tokyo to Brooklyn.” She also appeared in the "52nd Choreographers' Evening" at the Walker Art Center. Additionally, she showed a remixed version of her past work "All Hail the Queen" at Northrop at the University of Minnesota.

In 2023, Jinza Thayer was a Visiting Artist at MANCC, Florida State University School of Dance. As part of her residency, she worked with creative collaborators and students on her new work, "From Tokyo to Brooklyn: A Jagged Journey."

In 2018, Jinza Thayer premiered "All Hail the Queen" in the Goodale Theater at the Cowles Center in Minneapolis, MN. This work examined the historically censored anatomies of women, specifically the voice and the vagina.

In 2016, Jinza Thayer and Rosy Simas performed together at Carleton College in Northfield, Minnesota, that was the final performance of Simas' multi-city dance tour.

In 2013, Jinza Thayer was featured in “Minnesota Original,” an award-winning public television show that celebrates the artists of Minnesota.

=== Productions ===
Jinza Thayer has created more than 60 original works, including eight full-length evening works. The following is a partial list of her notable productions.

- From Tokyo to Brooklyn (2025). Choreographer: Jinza Thayer. Rehearsal Direction: Heidi Geier, Erin Thompson, Laurie Van Wieren. Primary Dancers: Stephanie Battle, Erika Hansen, Anne Lentz, Jinza Thayer. Additional Performers: Lelis Brito, Giuliana Ciabo, Kavya Chirayil, Dane Cree, Alejandra Iannone, Masanari Kawahara, and Tumelo Khupe, Starla Larson. Production Manager/Stage Manager: Daniel Grove. Assistant Stage Manager: Jillian Holstad. Installation Design: Lelis Brito. Projection Design: Boo McCaleb. Sound Design: Janika Vandervelde & Rhonda Lund. Costume Design: Anju Kataria. Lighting Design: Josh Wabaunsee. Northrop at the University of Minnesota, Minneapolis, MN.
- All Hail the Queen (2018). Choreographer: Deborah Jinza Thayer. Text: Melissa Birch. Composer: Janika Vandervelde. Installation: Amelia Biewald. Dancers: Julia Davidson, Non Edwards, Erika Hansen, Christine Maginnis, Sharon Picasso, Eve Schulte, Erin Thompson, and Roxane Wallace.
- Itch (2013). Choreographer: Deborah Jinza Thayer. Composer: Janika Vandervelde. The Southern Theater, Minneapolis, MN.
- Diana Takes A Swim (2012). Choreographer: Deborah Jinza Thayer. Composer: Janika Vandervelde. Red Eye Theater, Minneapolis, MN.
- Ode to Dolly (2009). Choreographer: Deborah Jinza Thayer. Music: Matthew Smith. Costumes: Lisa Axell and Laura Adams. Set design: Bryan Axell/3 Ring Scenic. Dancers: Rachel Barnes, Penelope Freeh, Sarah Jacobs, Christine Maginnis, Deidre Murnane, Sharon Picasso, Kimberly Richardson. New California Gallery, Minneapolis, MN.
- All That Glitters (2007). Choreographer: Deborah Jinza Thayer. Music: Tom Scott. Costumes: Lisa Axell. Set design: Bryan Axell. Cello: Michelle Kinney. Dancers: Penny Freeh, Joanna Furnans, Sarah Jacobs, Ariel Linnerson, Christine Maginnis, Debra McGee, Kimberly Richardson, Rosy Simas. The Southern Theater, Minneapolis, MN.
- My Little Cyborg (2002). Choreographer: Deborah Jinza Thayer. Set design: Ron Albert.

== Personal life ==
In 2012, Jinza Thayer and Rebecca Surmont were eating together at an outdoor restaurant in St. Paul, Minnesota, when a car crashed into the bistro. Jinza Thayer suffered several injuries, including a partially collapsed lung, cracked vertebrae, and fractured ribs.

== Awards and honors ==
- Minnesota State Arts Board, Creative Support for Individuals grant recipient, 2022
- McKnight Fellowship for Choreography, 2019
- Minnesota State Arts Board, Grant recipient, Fiscal 2018
- Metropolitan Regional Arts Council, Grant recipient, 2017
- American Composers Forum, Grant recipient, 2014
- Minnesota State Arts Board, Grant recipient, Fiscal 2014
- American Composers Forum, Grant recipient, 2011
- Blacklock Nature Sanctuary Fellowship, 2010
- SAGE Award for Choreographic Concept, 2010
- Minnesota State Arts Board, Grant recipient, 2009
- American Composers Forum, Grant recipient, 2006
- Associate Artist Residency at Atlantic Center for the Arts, 2006
- Jerome Foundation, Grant recipient for three-week residency at the Atlantic Center for the Arts, New Smyrna Beach, Florida, 2006
- McKnight Fellowship for Choreography, 2004
- Minnesota State Arts Board, Grant recipient, 2002
- Semi-finalist, Rencontres chorégraphiques internationales de Seine-Saint-Denis (Bagnolet, France), 2001
- Minnesota State Arts Board, Grant recipient, 1999
- Semi-finalist, Rencontres chorégraphiques internationales de Seine-Saint-Denis (Bagnolet, France), 1999
