= Savage Aural Hotbed =

Musical group from Minneapolis founded in 1988

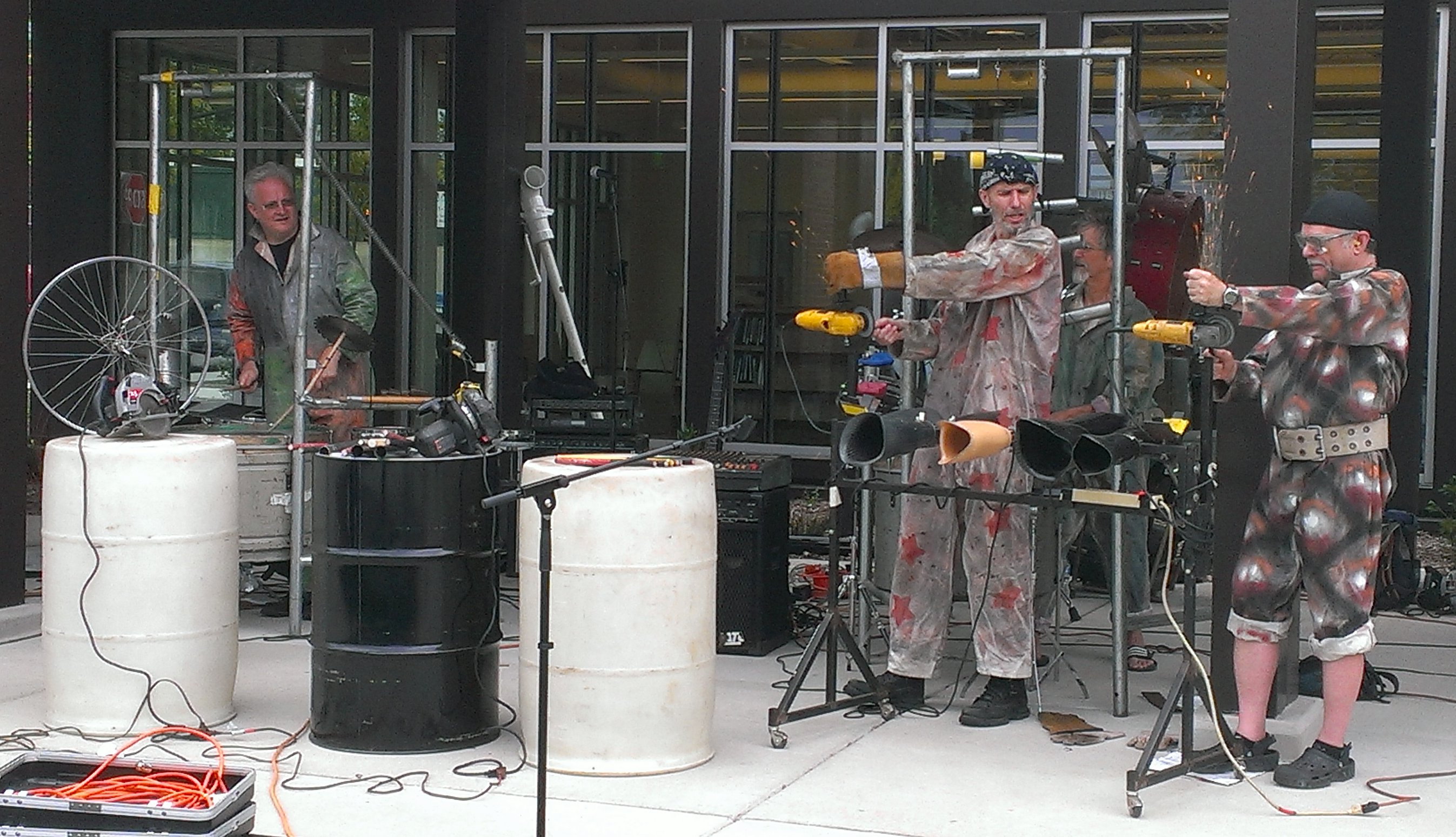
Savage Aural Hotbed performing at Saint Paul Public Library's 2014 Maker Festival

Savage Aural Hotbed (abbreviated as SAH) is a "found object" band based in Minneapolis, Minnesota, United States. Formed in 1988, SAH is a four-member band that performs instrumental percussive and ambient music. They are heavily influenced by Japanese taiko drumming, but also feature usage of home-made instruments, metal and plastic barrels, saw-blades, power-tools, and other hardware, both in the albums and in the live shows. They have released seven albums.

The band has been embraced by industrial, techno, and contemporary classical music enthusiasts. They have also worked with many different dance troupes including Ballet of the Dolls and the Flying Foot Forum. Savage Aural Hotbed has also been featured in an article on National Public Radio's Weekend Edition. They have won four Minnesota Music Awards.

Current members are Mark Black, Stuart DeVaan, Dean Hawthorne, and William Melton.

Past members are David Sarrazin, Valts Treibergs, and Tom Zosell.

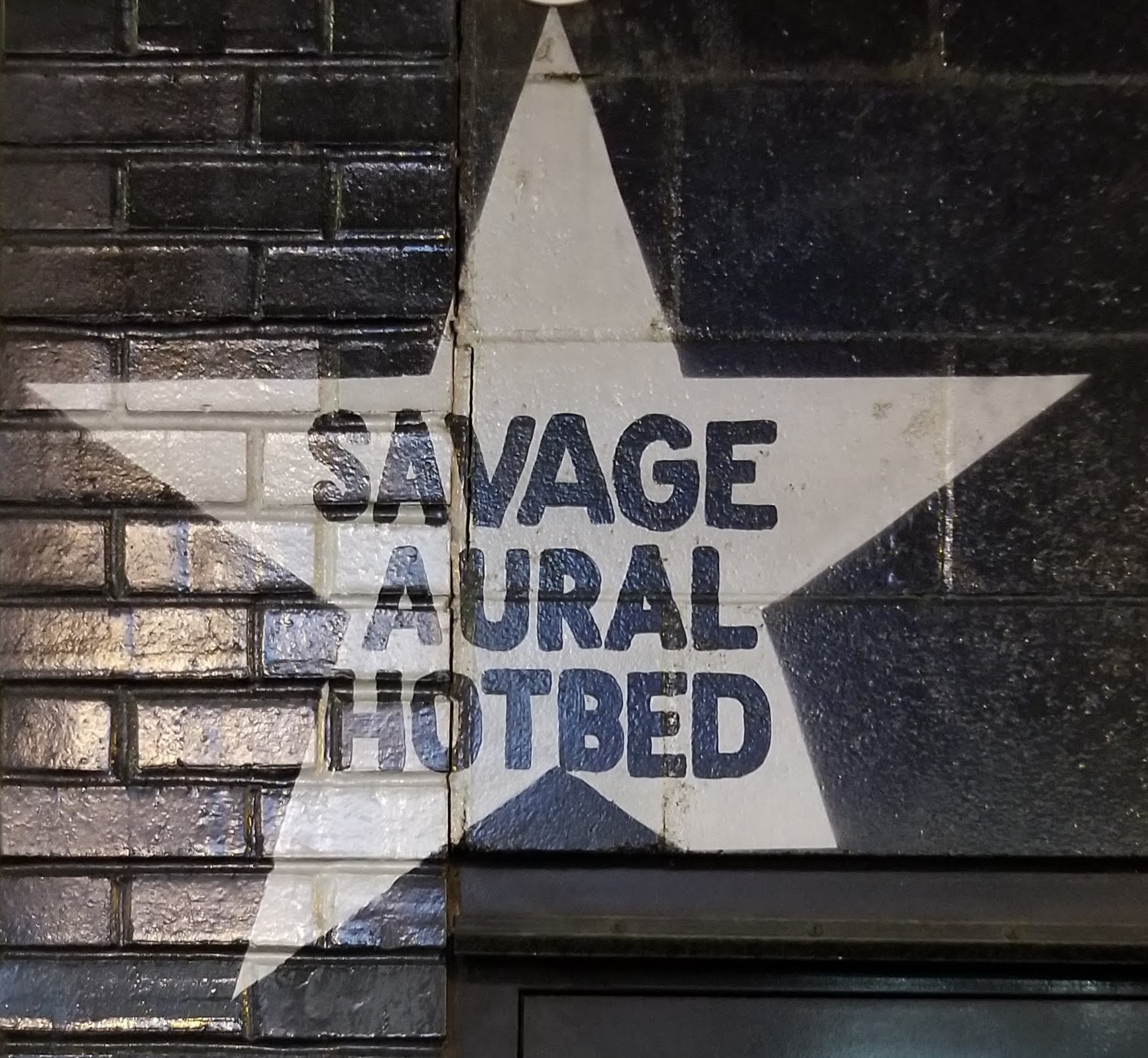
Savage Aural Hotbed's star on the outside mural of the Minneapolis nightclub First Avenue

The band has been honored with a star on the outside mural of the Minneapolis nightclub First Avenue, recognizing performers that have played sold-out shows or have otherwise demonstrated a major contribution to the culture at the iconic venue. Receiving a star "might be the most prestigious public honor an artist can receive in Minneapolis," according to journalist Steve Marsh.

== Genre ==
SAH tends to fit into industrial music, both in the literal sense, as they use industrial hardware, and in the figurative sense. Japanese Taiko drumming with its big arm movements and disciplined musical tightness is a major inspiration. Another influence is modern minimalist music, with frequent exploration of mathematical rhythm generating ideas.

== Discography ==
- Gomi Daiko (1992)
- Cold is the Absence of Heat (1995)
- Pressure of Silence (1997)
- The Strain and Force Handbook (2001)
- The Unified Pounding Theory (2006)
- Wreckquiem (2009)
- Glove of Sound (2011)
