= Innova Recordings =

Record label

- Parent company: American Composers Forum
- Founded: 1982
- Genre: Various
- Country of origin: U.S.
- Location: St. Paul, Minnesota
- Official website: www.innova.mu

Innova Recordings is the independent record label of the non-profit American Composers Forum based in St. Paul, Minnesota. It was founded in 1982 to document the winners of the McKnight Fellowship offered by its parent organization, the Minnesota (now American) Composers Forum.

During its early years, it produced several sampler LPs featuring the work of Minnesota composers, many of whom have since gone on to national prominence, such as Eric Stokes, Ann Millikan, Libby Larsen, Paul Schoenfield, and Stephen Paulus. With the advent of the compact disc, Innova began releasing highlights from the top ensembles, such as the Dale Warland Singers, Saint Paul Chamber Orchestra, and the Alexander String Quartet, that had been on the Composers Forum concert seasons.

The label produces between 25 and 40 CDs and DVDs per year. There are currently over 460 titles in the catalog covering the fields of classical music, experimental, electronic, jazz, and world music. It is best known for its series of releases featuring Harry Partch and Henry Brant. The label was awarded an endowment by the McKnight Foundation.

== Notable accolades ==
- Laurel Leaf Award from the American Composers Alliance (2012)
- ASCAP Deems Taylor Award (1998) for Enclosure Three: Harry Partch
- Grammy Nominations: David Frost (2003), Stuart Hyatt, (2005), Orlando Jacinto Garcia (2010)
- Stereophile: 80 Must-Have Recordings (2007), for Delusion of the Fury, Harry Partch
- Grants from the New York State Music Fund, and the National Endowment for the Arts.
- Million-dollar endowment by the McKnight Foundation

== See also ==
- List of record labels
