= Shakin' Stevens discography =

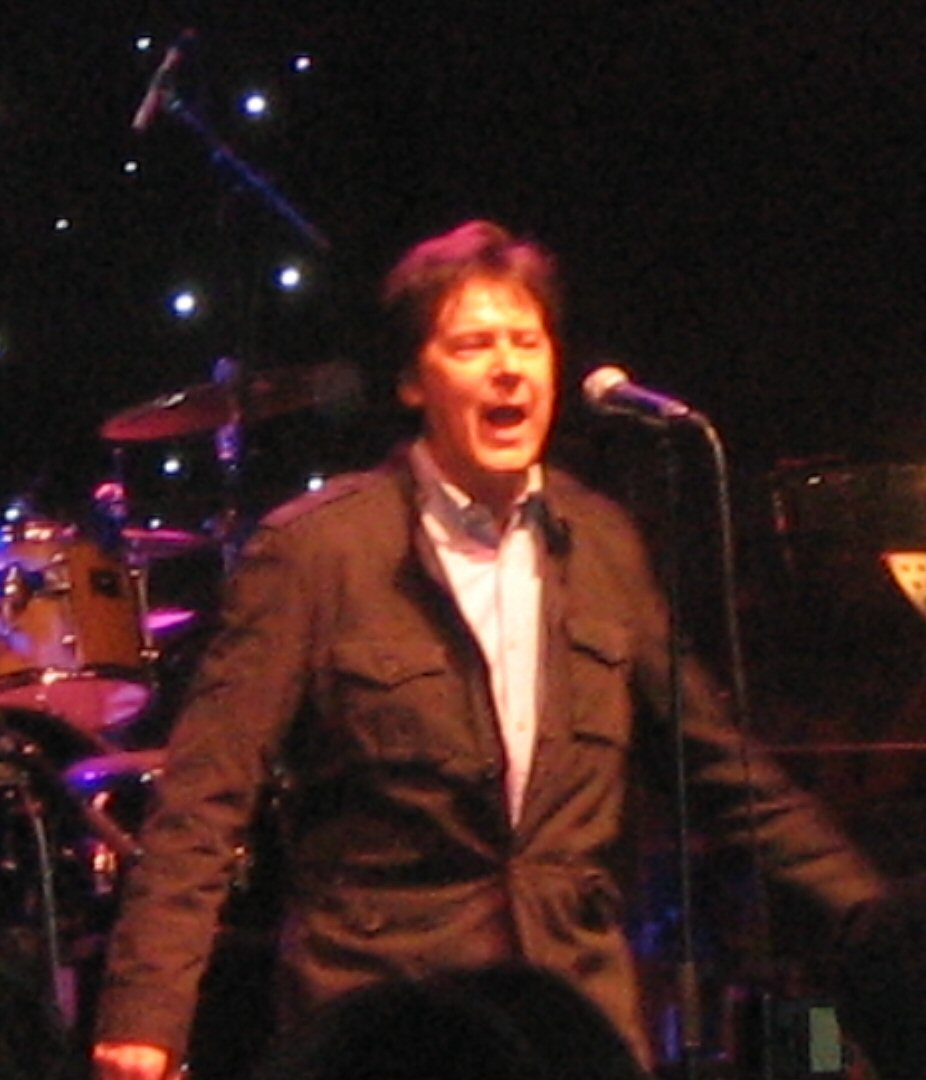
- Stevens in 2007
- Studio albums: 20
- Extended plays: 8
- Compilation albums: 21
- Singles: 71
- Video albums: 5
- Music videos: 37
- Re-issues: 10
- Box sets: 3

The discography of Welsh rock and roll singer Shakin' Stevens consists of twenty studio albums, 23 compilation albums, sixty-nine singles, three box sets, five video albums and thirty-seven music videos. Although the singer enjoyed his greatest period of success throughout the 1980s while recording for Epic Records, during the 1970s he was the lead vocalist for Shakin' Stevens and the Sunsets and had records issued by a variety of labels including Parlophone, CBS and Polydor in the UK and Pink Elephant and Dynamite in Europe.

Shakin' Stevens had his first entry in the UK Singles Chart with "Hot Dog" in 1980 and has had a total of thirty-three UK Top 40 hits, including four number one singles, and during the 1980s spent more weeks in the UK Singles Chart than any other artist. He also achieved number one singles in Ireland, Australia, Sweden, Austria, Norway, Switzerland and Poland as well as placing three albums in the Top 3 of the UK Albums Chart. Despite only a handful of new releases since the early 1990s, the advent of the digital download age has ensured an annual return to the UK Singles Chart for Stevens thanks to the enduring popularity of his seasonal hit "Merry Christmas Everyone".

A number of Shakin' Stevens releases were not issued in his native UK. Where this is the case, the original country of release (although not necessarily the sole country) is indicated in parentheses. However many of these have since seen UK issue, most notably in the 2020 "Fire In The Blood" box set.

== Albums ==
=== Studio albums ===
List of studio albums, with selected chart positions and certifications
Title	Details	Peak chart positions										Certifications
Title	Details	UK	AUS	AUT	DEN	GER	NLD	NOR	NZ	SWE	SWI	Certifications
A Legend ^{[A]}	Released: October 1970; Label: Parlophone; Formats: LP	—	—	—	—	—	—	—	—	—	—	
I'm No J.D. ^{[A]}	Released: July 1971; Label: CBS; Formats: LP	—	—	—	—	—	—	—	—	—	—	
Rockin' and Shakin' ^{[A]}	Released: March 1972; Label: Contour; Formats: LP	—	—	—	—	—	—	—	—	—	—	
Shakin' Stevens & Sunsets ^{[A]}	Released: 1973 (Netherlands) 1974 (UK); Label: Pink Elephant (Netherlands) Emerald (UK); Formats: LP	—	—	—	—	—	—	—	—	—	—	
Manhattan Melodrama ^{[A]}	Released: December 1975; Label: Pink Elephant (Netherlands); Formats: LP	—	—	—	—	—	—	—	—	—	—	
Come on Memphis! ^{[A]}	Released: January 1977; Label: Dynamite (Netherlands); Formats: 10" LP	—	—	—	—	—	—	—	—	—	—	
Shakin' Stevens	Released: 7 April 1978; Label: Track Records; Formats: LP	—	—	—	—	—	—	—	—	—	—	
Take One!	Released: 8 February 1980; Label: Epic; Formats: LP, MC	62	—	—	—	—	—	—	—	—	—	
Marie, Marie ^{[B]}	Released: 17 October 1980; Label: Epic; Formats: LP, MC	—	—	—	—	—	—	—	—	—	—	
This Ole House ^{[B]}	Released: 27 March 1981; Label: Epic; Formats: LP, MC	2	6	7	—	4	13	—	13	—	—	ARIA: 2× Platinum; BPI: Gold; BVMI: Gold
Shaky	Released: 4 September 1981; Label: Epic; Formats: LP, MC	1	11	1	—	4	10	2	29	2	—	ARIA: Platinum; BPI: Platinum; BVMI: Gold
Give Me Your Heart Tonight	Released: 1 October 1982; Label: Epic; Formats: LP, MC	3	—	6	—	10	15	6	—	19	—	BPI: Platinum
The Bop Won't Stop	Released: 26 November 1983; Label: Epic; Formats: LP, MC, CD	21	73	—	—	24	38	6	—	—	12	BPI: Gold
Lipstick Powder and Paint	Released: 4 November 1985; Label: Epic; Formats: LP, MC	37	—	—	—	59	—	—	—	—	27	BPI: Gold
Let's Boogie	Released: 19 October 1987; Label: Epic; Formats: LP, MC, CD	59	—	—	—	—	—	—	—	—	—	
A Whole Lotta Shaky	Released: 7 November 1988; Label: Epic; Formats: LP, MC, CD	42	80	—	—	—	—	—	—	—	—	
There Are Two Kinds of Music... Rock 'n' Roll	Released: 8 October 1990; Label: Telstar; Formats: LP, MC, CD	65	—	—	—	—	—	—	—	—	—	
Merry Christmas Everyone	Released: 25 November 1991; Label: Epic; Formats: LP, MC, CD	—	—	—	27	8	14	—	—	—	—	
Now Listen	Released: 29 May 2007; Label: Sony BMG; Formats: CD	—	—	—	8	—	—	—	—	—	—	
Echoes of Our Times	Released: 16 September 2016; Label: HEC; Formats: CD, DL	22	—	—	—	—	—	—	—	—	—	
Re-Set	Released: 28 April 2023; Label: HEC; Formats: CD, DL, LP	24	—	68	—	61	—	—	—	—	—	
"—" denotes a recording that did not (or not yet) chart or was not released in that territory.

=== Compilation albums ===
List of compilation albums, with selected chart positions and certifications
Title	Details	Peak chart positions							Certifications
Title	Details	UK	AUS	AUT	DEN	GER	IRL	SWE	Certifications
Greatest Hits	Released: 5 November 1984; Label: Epic; Formats: LP, MC	8	83	53	—	56	—	—	BPI: Platinum
The Epic Years	Released: 19 October 1992; Label: Epic; Formats: LP, MC, CD	57	—	—	—	—	—	—	
The Hits Of Shakin' Stevens	Released: 12 February 1996; Label: Epic; Formats: CD, MC	—	—	—	—	—	—	—	BPI: Silver
The Hits Of Shakin' Stevens Vol. II	Released: 1998; Label: Epic; Formats: CD, MC	—	—	—	—	—	—	—	
The Collection	Released: 11 April 2005; Label: Sony BMG; Formats: CD/DVD	4	—	61	2	54	12	1	BPI: Gold; IFPI DEN: Gold
Chronology – The Epic Hit Singles	Released: 15 October 2007; Label: Music Club; Formats: Double CD	—	—	—	—	—	—	—	
Red Hot and Rockin'	Released: 16 September 2011; Label: Sony Music; Formats: CD, digital download	—	—	—	—	—	—	—	
Rock and Country Blues	Released: 16 September 2011; Label: Sony Music; Formats: CD, digital download	—	—	—	—	—	—	—	
Rocking Rhythm	Released: 7 October 2011; Label: Sony Music; Formats: CD, digital download	—	—	—	—	—	—	—	
Rockin' the Blues	Released: 7 October 2011; Label: Sony Music; Formats: CD, digital download	—	—	—	—	—	—	—	
Country Blues	Released: 28 October 2011; Label: Sony Music; Formats: CD, digital download	—	—	—	—	—	—	—	
Rockin' with Country	Released: 28 October 2011; Label: Sony Music; Formats: CD, digital download	—	—	—	—	—	—	—	
Singled Out	Released: 27 November 2020; Label: BMG; Formats: 3×CD, 2×LP, digital download	10	—	68	—	88	86	—	BPI: Silver
Fire in the Blood	Released: 27 November 2020; Label: BMG; Formats: 19×CD 'Bookpack', digital	—	—	72	—	54	—	—	
"—" denotes a recording that did not chart or was not released in that territory.

=== Non-UK compilation albums ===
List of non-UK compilation albums, with selected chart positions and certifications
Title	Details	Peak chart positions						Certifications
Title	Details	AUS	CAN	DEN	GER	NOR	NZ	Certifications
Get Shakin'	Released: July 1981; Label: Epic (USA/Canada); Formats: LP, MC	—	—	—	—	—	—	
You Drive Me Crazy	Released: 1981; Label: Epic (Japan); Formats: LP	—	—	—	—	—	—	
You Drive Me Crazy ^{[C]}	Released: April 1982; Label: Epic (USA/Canada); Formats: LP, MC	—	82	—	—	—	—	
Jetzt Kommt Shaky	Released: March 1983; Label: Epic (Germany); Formats: LP, MC	—	—	—	13	—	—	
A Rockin' Good Way	Released: 1985; Label: CBS Direct (Canada); Formats: LP, MC	—	—	—	—	—	—	
Greatest Hits	Released: 1985; Label: J&B (Australia); Formats: LP, MC	86	—	—	—	—	—	
A Whole Lotta Hits	Released: 1994; Label: Epic (Denmark); Formats: CD	—	—	1	—	—	—	
The Singles Collection	Released: 1994; Label: Arcade (Germany); Formats: CD	—	—	—	—	—	—	
The Very Best Of Shakin' Stevens	Released: 1999; Label: Epic (Norway); Formats: CD	—	—	—	—	12	—	
Collectable	Released: 26 July 2004; Label: Sony BMG (Denmark); Formats: CD/DVD	—	—	1	—	—	22	IFPI DEN: Gold
"—" denotes a recording that did not chart or was not released in that territory.

=== Re-issues ===
List of re-issues, with selected chart positions and certifications
Title	Details	Peak chart positions			Certifications
Title	Details	UK	AUT	GER	Certifications
Come on Memphis! ^{[A]} ^{[D]}	Released: 1979; Label: Dynamite (Netherlands); Formats: LP	—	—	—	
A Legend ^{[A]}	Released: September 1979; Label: EMI; Formats: LP, MC	—	—	—	
Shakin' Stevens and the Sunsets ^{[A]} ^{[E]}	Released: 30 June 1981; Label: Hallmark; Formats: LP, MC	34	—	—	BPI: Gold
Manhattan Melodrama ^{[A]}	Released: July 1981; Label: Mint; Formats: LP, MC	—	—	—	
Shakin' Stevens & Sunsets ^{[A]}	Released: August 1981; Label: Mint; Formats: LP, MC	—	—	—	
Shakin' Stevens and the Sunsets ^{[A]} ^{[F]}	Released: September 1981; Label: Contour/Pickwick; Formats: LP, MC	—	—	—	
Rock On with a Legend ^{[A]}	Released: October 1981; Label: MFP; Formats: LP, MC	—	—	—	
At the Rockhouse ^{[A]} ^{[G]}	Released: 1981; Label: Magnum Force; Formats: LP	—	—	—	
Hot Dog ^{[H]}	Released: 9 April 1982; Label: Epic; Formats: LP, MC	—	9	11	
Shakin' Stevens	Released: October 1983; Label: Polydor; Formats: LP, MC	—	—	—	
"—" denotes a recording that did not chart or was not released in that territory.

=== Box sets ===
List of box sets
Title	Details
All the Hits	Released: 1993; Label: Pickwick; Formats: 3 CD Box set
Hits and More	Released: 8 September 2003; Label: Sony Music; Formats: 3-CD Box set
The Epic Masters	Released: 16 November 2009; Label: Sony Music; Formats: 10-CD Box set, digital download
Fire in the Blood: The Definitive Collection	Released: 13 November 2020; Label: BMG; Formats: 19-CD box set

== EPs ==
List of extended plays
Title	Details	Peak chart positions		Certifications
Title	Details	UK	IRE	Certifications
Frantic ^{[A]}	Released: 1975; Label: Skydog (Netherlands); Formats: 7"	—	—	
Sexy Ways ^{[A]}	Released: 1976; Label: Dynamo (Netherlands); Formats: 7"	—	—	
Memphis Earthquake ^{[A]}	Released: October 1980; Label: Magnum Force; Formats: 7"	—	—	
Shakin' Stevens	Released: January 1981; Label: Epic Nu Disk (US and Canada); Formats: 10"	—	—	
The Shakin' Stevens EP	Released: 3 December 1982; Label: Epic; Formats: 7"	2	2	BPI: Silver
Greatest Original Hits – 4 Track E.P.	Released: 18 February 1983; Label: Epic; Formats: 7", MC	143	—	
Justine ^{[A]}	Released: February 1983; Label: Magnum Force; Formats: 7"	—	—	
Four Play: Volume Twenty	Released: 21 March 1988; Label: Epic (Australia); Formats: CD, 12"	—	—	
"—" denotes a recording that did not chart or was not released in that territory.

== Singles ==
List of singles, with selected chart positions and certifications
Title	Year	Peak chart positions										Certifications	Album
Title	Year	UK	AUS	AUT	BEL	DEN	GER	IRE	NL	SWI	US	Certifications	Album
"Spirit of Woodstock" ^{[A]}	1970	—	—	—	—	—	—	—	—	—	—		A Legend
"Sweet Little Rock and Roller" ^{[A]}	1972	—	—	—	—	—	—	—	—	—	—		Non-album single
"Sea Cruise" ^{[A]} (Netherlands)	1972	—	—	—	—	—	—	—	—	—	—		I'm No J.D.
"Honey Don't" ^{[A]} (Sweden)	1973	—	—	—	—	—	—	—	—	—	—		I'm No J.D.
"Honey Honey" ^{[A]}	1973	—	—	—	—	—	—	—	—	—	—		Shakin' Stevens & Sunsets
"Spirit of Woodstock" ^{[A]} ^{[I]} (Netherlands)	1973	—	—	—	—	—	—	—	—	—	—		Shakin' Stevens & Sunsets
"It Came Out of the Sky" ^{[A]} (Germany)	1974	—	—	—	—	—	—	—	—	—	—		Shakin' Stevens & Sunsets
"Lonesome Town" (Netherlands)	1974	—	—	—	—	—	—	—	—	—	—		Non-album singles
"Jungle Rock" ^{[A]}	1976	—	—	—	—	—	—	—	—	—	—		Non-album singles
"You Mostest Girl" ^{[A]} (Netherlands)	1976	—	—	—	—	—	—	—	—	—	—		Come on Memphis!
"Never"	1977	—	—	—	—	—	—	—	—	—	—		Non-album singles
"Somebody Touched Me"	1977	—	38	—	—	—	—	—	—	—	—		Non-album singles
"Justine"	1978	—	—	—	—	—	—	—	—	—	—		Shakin' Stevens
"Treat Her Right"	1978	—	—	—	—	—	—	—	—	—	—		Non-album singles
"Endless Sleep"	1979	—	—	—	—	—	—	—	—	—	—		Non-album singles
"Fire" (Netherlands)	1979	—	—	—	—	—	—	—	—	—	—		Non-album singles
"Spooky"	1979	—	—	—	—	—	—	—	—	—	—		Non-album singles
"Hot Dog"	1980	24	—	—	—	—	—	—	—	—	—		Take One!
"Hey Mae"	1980	83	—	—	—	—	—	—	—	—	—		This Ole House (Marie, Marie)
"Marie, Marie"	1980	19	—	—	—	—	19	28	—	—	—		This Ole House (Marie, Marie)
"Shooting Gallery"	1980	76	—	—	—	—	—	—	—	—	—		This Ole House (Marie, Marie)
"This Ole House"	1981	1	1	8	3	6	5	1	6	4	—	BPI: Gold; ARIA: Platinum	This Ole House (Marie, Marie)
"You Drive Me Crazy"	1981	2	1	6	4	1	6	1	5	4	—	BPI: Gold; ARIA: Gold	Shaky
"Green Door"	1981	1	8	8	7	1	6	1	8	5	—	BPI: Gold; ARIA: Gold	Shaky
"No Other Baby" ^{[A]}	1981	—	—	—	—	—	—	—	—	—	—		Non-album singles
"Shaky Sings Elvis" ^{[K]}	1981	—	89	—	—	—	—	—	—	—	—		Non-album singles
"It's Raining"	1981	10	75	11	9	4	13	2	8	—	—	BPI: Silver	Shaky
"Mona Lisa" (Japan)	1981	—	—	—	—	—	—	—	—	—	—		Shaky
"Oh Julie"	1982	1	3	1	3	1	2	1	6	1	—	BPI: Gold	Give Me Your Heart Tonight
"Shirley"	1982	6	—	4	10	2	7	4	11	4	—		Give Me Your Heart Tonight
"Give Me Your Heart Tonight"	1982	11	74	10	6	2	6	5	14	6	—		Give Me Your Heart Tonight
"I'll Be Satisfied"	1982	10	—	—	19	8	27	5	25	—	—		Give Me Your Heart Tonight
"Vanessa" (South Africa)	1982	—	—	—	—	—	—	—	—	—	—		Give Me Your Heart Tonight
"Tiger" ^{[A]}	1983	160	—	—	—	—	—	—	—	—	—		Non-album singles
"Your Ma Said You Cried In Your Sleep Last Night" (Europe)	1983	—	—	—	—	9	40	—	—	—	—		Non-album singles
"It's Late"	1983	11	—	—	36	4	18	3	—	—	—		The Bop Won't Stop
"Cry Just a Little Bit"	1983	3	31	—	15	3	27	2	19	19	67	BPI: Silver	The Bop Won't Stop
"A Rockin' Good Way" (with Bonnie Tyler)	1983	5	21	9	5	2	22	1	8	10	—		The Bop Won't Stop
"A Love Worth Waiting For"	1984	2	44	13	24	—	26	2	24	—	—	BPI: Silver	The Bop Won't Stop
"Diddle I" (Mexico)	1984	—	—	—	—	—	—	—	—	—	—		The Bop Won't Stop
"A Letter to You"	1984	10	—	—	37	8	44	—	30	21	—		Greatest Hits
"Teardrops"	1984	5	71	14	25	8	25	5	49	—	—	BPI: Silver	Greatest Hits
"Breaking Up My Heart"	1985	14	—	23	32	15	31	7	—	—	—		Greatest Hits
"Lipstick, Powder and Paint"	1985	11	—	24	21	8	52	11	48	22	—		Lipstick, Powder and Paint
"Merry Christmas Everyone"	1985	1	27	3	10	6	3	3	6	9	—	BPI: 5× Platinum; IFPI DEN: 4× Platinum	Non-album single
"Turning Away"	1986	15	—	—	20	—	—	11	—	—	—		Lipstick, Powder and Paint
"Because I Love You"	1986	14	—	—	29	—	—	13	—	—	—		Let's Boogie
"A Little Boogie Woogie (In the Back of My Mind)"	1987	12	—	—	—	—	—	9	—	—	—		Let's Boogie
"Come See About Me"	1987	24	—	—	—	—	—	15	—	—	—		Let's Boogie
"What Do You Want to Make Those Eyes at Me For?"	1987	5	—	—	25	—	—	8	—	—	—		Let's Boogie
"Feel the Need in Me"	1988	26	—	—	—	—	—	17	—	—	—		Non-album single
"How Many Tears Can You Hide"	1988	47	—	—	—	—	—	—	—	—	—		A Whole Lotta Shaky
"True Love"	1988	23	—	—	—	—	—	—	—	—	—		A Whole Lotta Shaky
"Jezebel"	1989	58	—	—	38	—	—	—	—	—	—		A Whole Lotta Shaky
"Love Attack"	1989	28	—	—	—	—	—	27	—	—	—		There Are Two Kinds of Music... Rock 'n' Roll
"I Might"	1990	18	—	26	7	—	—	14	15	—	—		There Are Two Kinds of Music... Rock 'n' Roll
"Yes I Do"	1990	60	—	—	27	—	—	—	—	—	—		There Are Two Kinds of Music... Rock 'n' Roll
"Pink Champagne"	1990	59	—	—	—	—	—	—	—	—	—		There Are Two Kinds of Music... Rock 'n' Roll
"My Cutie Cutie"	1990	75	—	—	—	—	—	—	—	—	—		There Are Two Kinds of Music... Rock 'n' Roll
"The Best Christmas of Them All"	1990	19	—	—	—	—	—	22	—	—	—		Merry Christmas Everyone
"I'll Be Home This Christmas"	1991	34	—	—	—	—	—	—	—	—	—		Merry Christmas Everyone
"Radio" ^{[L]}	1992	37	—	—	—	—	—	—	—	—	—		The Epic Years
"I Can Help" (Germany)	1994	—	—	—	—	—	—	—	—	—	—		The Singles Collection
"Rock 'n' Roll Hitmix '99" (Germany)	1999	—	—	—	—	—	—	—	—	—	—		Non-album single
"Trouble"/"This Ole House"	2005	20	—	—	—	—	—	—	—	—	—		Now Listen/ The Collection
"Echoes of Merry Christmas Everyone"	2015	—	—	—	—	—	—	—	—	—	—		Non-album single
"Last Man Alive" (radio version)	2016	—	—	—	—	—	—	—	—	—	—		Echoes of Our Times
"Down into Muddy Water" (radio mix)	2016	—	—	—	—	—	—	—	—	—	—		Echoes of Our Times
"Down in the Hole" (radio mix)	2017	—	—	—	—	—	—	—	—	—	—		Echoes of Our Times
"I Need You Now"	2020	—	—	—	—	—	—	—	—	—	—		Fire in the Blood: The Definitive Collection Bookpack
"Wild at Heart"	2020	—	—	—	—	—	—	—	—	—	—		Fire in the Blood: The Definitive Collection Bookpack
"It All Comes Round"	2023	—	—	—	—	—	—	—	—	—	—		Re-Set
"All You Need Is Greed"	2023	—	—	—	—	—	—	—	—	—	—		Re-Set

== Videos ==
=== Video albums ===
List of video albums
Title	Details
Shakin' Stevens Video Show	Released: 30 March 1984; Label: CBS/Fox Video; Formats: VHS
Shakin' Stevens Video Show Vol. 2	Released: November 1987; Label: CBS/Fox Video; Formats: VHS
There Are Two Kinds Of Music...Rock 'N' Roll	Released: October 1990; Label: Telstar Video; Formats: VHS
The Epic Videos	Released: November 1992; Label: SRV Enterprises; Formats: VHS
The DVD Collection	Released: 13 May 2005; Label: Sony BMG; Formats: DVD

=== Music videos ===
List of music videos, showing year filmed and first commercial release
Title	Year	Commercial release
"Somebody Touched Me"	1977	No commercial release
"This Ole House"	1981	Shakin' Stevens Video Show
"You Drive Me Crazy"	1981	Shakin' Stevens Video Show
"Green Door"	1981	Shakin' Stevens Video Show
"It's Raining"	1981	Shakin' Stevens Video Show
"Oh Julie"	1982	Shakin' Stevens Video Show
"Shirley"	1982	Shakin' Stevens Video Show
"Give Me Your Heart Tonight"	1982	Shakin' Stevens Video Show
"I'll Be Satisfied"	1982	Shakin' Stevens Video Show
"It's Late" ^{[M]}	1983	Shakin' Stevens Video Show
"Cry Just a Little Bit"	1983	Shakin' Stevens Video Show
"A Rockin' Good Way"	1984	Shakin' Stevens Video Show
"Marie, Marie"	1984	Shakin' Stevens Video Show
"A Love Worth Waiting For"	1984	Shakin' Stevens Video Show Vol. 2
"A Letter to You"	1984	Shakin' Stevens Video Show Vol. 2
"Teardrops"	1984	Shakin' Stevens Video Show Vol. 2
"Breaking Up My Heart"	1985	Shakin' Stevens Video Show Vol. 2
"Lipstick, Powder And Paint"	1985	Shakin' Stevens Video Show Vol. 2
"Merry Christmas Everyone"	1985	Shakin' Stevens Video Show Vol. 2
"Turning Away"	1986	Shakin' Stevens Video Show Vol. 2
"Because I Love You"	1986	Shakin' Stevens Video Show Vol. 2
"A Little Boogie Woogie (In the Back of My Mind)"	1987	Shakin' Stevens Video Show Vol. 2
"Come See About Me"	1987	Shakin' Stevens Video Show Vol. 2
"What Do You Want to Make Those Eyes at Me For"	1987	There Are Two Kinds Of Music... Rock 'N' Roll
"Feel the Need in Me"	1988	The DVD Collection
"How Many Tears Can You Hide"	1988	The DVD Collection
"True Love"	1988	No commercial release
"Jezebel"	1989	No commercial release
"Love Attack"	1989	There Are Two Kinds Of Music... Rock 'N' Roll
"I Might"	1990	There Are Two Kinds Of Music... Rock 'N' Roll
"Yes I Do"	1990	There Are Two Kinds Of Music... Rock 'N' Roll
"Pink Champagne"	1990	There Are Two Kinds Of Music... Rock 'N' Roll
"My Cutie Cutie"	1990	There Are Two Kinds Of Music... Rock 'N' Roll
"The Best Christmas of Them All"	1990	The DVD Collection
"I'll Be Home This Christmas"	1991	The DVD Collection
"Radio"	1992	The Epic Videos
"Now Listen"	2007	No commercial release
"Echoes of Merry Christmas Everyone"	2015	The Salvation Army Charity release
"Last Man Alive"	2016	No commercial release
"Down in the Hole"	2017	No commercial release
"Wild at Heart"	2020	No commercial release

== Notes ==
A. Credited to Shakin' Stevens and the Sunsets.
B. The Marie, Marie album was re-named and re-issued as This Ole House with the title song replacing one of the original tracks.
C. The North American You Drive Me Crazy album bears no relation to the Japanese release of the same name.
D. Re-issue of Come on Memphis! with two additional tracks.
E. Re-issue of I'm No J.D. with alternate track listing.
F. Re-issue of Rockin' and Shakin' .

G. Re-issue of Come on Memphis! with alternate track listing.
H. Re-issue of Take One! with two recent B-sides replacing two of the original tracks.
I. A re-recorded version of the 1970 single.
J. Credited to Shakin' Stevens and Bonnie Tyler.
K. Released as "Stuck on Elvis" in Australia and New Zealand
L. Credited to Shaky and Roger Taylor.
M: Filmed at Knebworth House, Hertfordshire
