= The Collection (Shakin' Stevens album) =

Compilation album by Shakin' Stevens
- Released: 1 April 2005
- Recorded: 1979–1992
- Genre: Rock and roll; pop rock
- Length: 78:10
- Label: Epic; Sony BMG
- Producer: Various

Shakin' Stevens chronology
Collectable (2004)	The Collection (2005)	Now Listen (2007)

Professional ratings
Review scores
Source	Rating
AllMusic	3.5/5 stars
Encyclopedia of Popular Music	3/5 stars

The Collection is a compilation album by Welsh rockabilly singer Shakin' Stevens, released in April 2005. A live performance DVD was also released with the CD in Europe and was only available in the UK via import versions. In May 2005, a different DVD, called The DVD Collection, was released, which included 27 songs and bonus material. The Collection peaked at number 4 on the UK Albums Chart.

== Reception ==
Reviewing the album for AllMusic, Thom Jurek described it as a "dynamite find" and that "there have been many compilations over the years, but none are this extensive or pervasive in covering his underappreciated career. The DVD included with the import version offers proof as to why Stevens sold out concert halls all over Europe and Japan". Joe Goodden for BBC Wales Music described the album as a "definitive collection of Shakin' Stevens hits" and that it "should deservedly revive the fortunes of one of Wales' most fondly remembered and successful singers".

== Track listing ==
The Collection
No.	Title	Writer(s)	Length
1.	"This Ole House"	Stuart Hamblen	3:07
2.	"Cry Just a Little Bit"	Bob Heatlie	3:13
3.	"Lipstick Powder & Paint"	Jesse Stone	2:45
4.	"Green Door"	Bob Davie; Marvin Moore	3:13
5.	"A Love Worth Waiting For"	Gary Sulsh; Stuart Leathwood	3:22
6.	"What Do You Want to Make Those Eyes at Me For"	Joseph McCarthy; Howard Johnson; James V. Monaco	2:51
7.	"A Rockin' Good Way (To Mess Around and Fall in Love)" (with Bonnie Tyler)	Brook Benton; Clyde Otis; Luchi DeJesus	2:56
8.	"Marie, Marie"	Dave Alvin	2:46
9.	"Teardrops"	Shakin' Stevens	3:56
10.	"Turning Away"	Tim Krekel	3:24
11.	"You Drive Me Crazy"	Ronnie Harwood	2:53
12.	"A Letter to You"	Dennis Linde	3:12
13.	"Oh Julie"	Stevens	2:34
14.	"Because I Love You"	Gordon Campbell	3:20
15.	"Hot Dog"	Buck Owens; Denny Dedmon	2:38
16.	"Breaking Up My Heart"	Heatlie	3:59
17.	"It's Raining"	Naomi Neville	3:18
18.	"Shirley"	John Fred; Tommy Bryan	2:49
19.	"A Little Boogie Woogie (In the Back of My Mind)"	Gary Glitter; Mike Leander; Eddie Seago	3:30
20.	"Give Me Your Heart Tonight"	Billy Livsey	3:06
21.	"Radio"	Heatlie; Campbell	3:31
22.	"I'll Be Satisfied"	Berry Gordy; Tyran Carlo	3:12
23.	"Feel the Need in Me"	Abrim Tilmon	3:01
24.	"It's Late"	Dorsey Burnette	2:04
25.	"Merry Christmas Everyone"	Heatlie	3:40
Total length:			78:10

Bonus DVD
No.	Title	Length
1.	"This Ole House" (Video Version)
2.	"A Little Boogie Woogie (In the Back of My Mind)"
3.	"Come See About Me"
4.	"What Do You Want to Make Those Eyes at Me For"
5.	"A Rockin' Good Way (To Mess Around and Fall in Love)" (with Bonnie Tyler)
6.	"Love Attack"
7.	"Teardrops"
8.	"Turning Away"
9.	"Green Door"
10.	"Radio"
11.	"My Cutie Cutie"
12.	"It's Late"

The DVD Collection
No.	Title	Length
1.	"A Little Boogie Woogie (In the Back of My Mind)"
2.	"Come See About Me"
3.	"What Do You Want to Make Those Eyes at Me For"
4.	"A Rockin' Good Time (To Mess Around and Fall in Love)" (with Bonnie Tyler)
5.	"Love Attack"
6.	"Teardrops"
7.	"Turning Away"
8.	"You Drive Me Crazy"
9.	"Yes I Do"
10.	"A Letter to You"
11.	"Oh Julie"
12.	"Because I Love You"
13.	"I Might"
14.	"Breaking Up My Heart"
15.	"It's Raining"
16.	"How Many Tears Can You Hide"
17.	"Jezebel"
18.	"This Ole House"
19.	"Lipstick, Paint and Powder"
20.	"Green Door"
21.	"A Love Worth Waiting For"
22.	"Radio"
23.	"My Cutie Cutie"
24.	"Pink Champagne"
25.	"Feel the Need in Me"
26.	"Give Me Your Heart Tonight"
27.	"It's Late"

== Charts ==
=== Weekly charts ===
Chart (2005)	Peak position
Irish Albums (IRMA)	12
Scottish Albums (Official Charts)	2
UK Albums (Official Charts)	4
Chart (2006)	Peak position
Austrian Albums (Ö3 Austria)	61
German Albums (Offizielle Top 100)	54
Chart (2010)	Peak position
Danish Albums (Hitlisten)	2
Swedish Albums (Sverigetopplistan)	1

=== Year-end charts ===
Chart (2005)	Position
UK Albums (OCC)	138
Chart (2010)	Position
Swedish Albums (Sverigetopplistan)	35

== Certifications and sales ==
Region	Certification	Certified units/sales
Denmark (IFPI Danmark)	Gold	20,000^{^}
United Kingdom (BPI)	Gold	100,000^{^}
^{^} Shipments figures based on certification alone.
