= Singled Out (Shakin' Stevens album) =

Compilation album by Shakin' Stevens
- Released: 27 November 2020
- Recorded: 1977–2020
- Genre: Rock and roll; pop rock
- Length: 168:53 (CD); 81:57 (LP)
- Label: BMG
- Producer: Various

Shakin' Stevens chronology
| Echoes of Our Times (2016) | Singled Out (2020) | Fire in the Blood (2020) |

Singled Out: The Definitive Singles Collection is a compilation album by Welsh singer Shakin' Stevens, released in November 2020. It peaked at number 10 on the UK Albums Chart.

It was released as a 3-CD and a 2-LP set. The 3-CD release contains 54 tracks, featuring every single released by Stevens throughout his solo career after splitting from the Sunsets in 1977. The 2-LP release contains 26 tracks personally selected by Stevens and came with a card to download all 54 tracks.

== Track listing ==
=== CD ===
Disc one
| No. | Title | Writer(s) | Length |
|---|---|---|---|
| 1. | "Never" | Terry Fell | 2:50 |
| 2. | "Somebody Touched Me" | Ahmet Ertegun | 2:40 |
| 3. | "Justine" | Dewey Terry; Don "Sugarcane" Harris | 3:04 |
| 4. | "Treat Her Right" | Roy Head; Gene Kurtz | 3:34 |
| 5. | "Endless Sleep" | Jody Reynolds; Dolores Nance | 3:32 |
| 6. | "Spooky" | Harry Middlebrooks; Mike Shapiro; Buddy Buie; James Cobb | 3:34 |
| 7. | "Hot Dog" | Buck Owens; Denny Dedmon | 2:36 |
| 8. | "Hey Mae" | Rusty Kershaw; Doug Kershaw | 2:35 |
| 9. | "Marie, Marie" | Dave Alvin | 2:47 |
| 10. | "Shooting Gallery" | Tom Colton; Brian Hodgson | 3:14 |
| 11. | "This Ole House" | Stuart Hamblen | 3:07 |
| 12. | "You Drive Me Crazy" | Ronnie Harwood | 2:51 |
| 13. | "Green Door" | Bob Davie; Marvin Moore | 3:13 |
| 14. | "It's Raining" | Allen Toussaint | 3:19 |
| 15. | "Oh Julie" | Shakin' Stevens | 2:35 |
| 16. | "Shirley" | John Fred; Tommy Bryan | 2:51 |
| 17. | "Give Me Your Heart Tonight" | Billy Livsey | 3:08 |
| 18. | "I'll Be Satisfied" | Berry Gordy; Tyran Carlo | 3:12 |
| Total length: | | | 54:42 |

Disc two
| No. | Title | Writer(s) | Length |
|---|---|---|---|
| 1. | "It's Late" | Dorsey Burnette | 2:04 |
| 2. | "Cry Just a Little Bit" | Bob Heatlie | 3:14 |
| 3. | "Your Ma Said You Cried in Your Sleep Last Night" | Stephen Schlaks; Tom Glazer | 3:26 |
| 4. | "A Rockin' Good Way" (with Bonnie Tyler) | Clyde Otis; Luchi DeJesus; Brook Benton | 2:58 |
| 5. | "A Love Worth Waiting For" | Gary Sulsh; Stuart Leathwood | 3:23 |
| 6. | "A Letter to You" | Dennis Linde | 3:14 |
| 7. | "Teardrops" | Stevens | 3:58 |
| 8. | "Breaking Up My Heart" | Heatlie | 3:59 |
| 9. | "Lipstick Powder & Paint" | Jesse Stone | 2:46 |
| 10. | "Turning Away" | Tim Krekel | 3:24 |
| 11. | "Because I Love You" | Gordon Campbell | 3:20 |
| 12. | "A Little Boogie Woogie (In the Back of My Mind)" | Gary Glitter; Mike Leander; Eddie Seago | 2:51 |
| 13. | "Come See About Me" | Holland–Dozier–Holland | 3:25 |
| 14. | "What Do You Want to Make Those Eyes at Me For" | Joseph McCarthy; Howard Johnson; James V. Monaco | 2:52 |
| 15. | "Feel the Need in Me" | Abrim Tilmon | 3:03 |
| 16. | "How Many Tears Can You Hide" | Frankie Miller; Graham Lyle | 3:40 |
| 17. | "True Love" | Cole Porter | 2:43 |
| Total length: | | | 54:20 |

Disc three
| No. | Title | Writer(s) | Length |
|---|---|---|---|
| 1. | "Jezebel" (re-mix) | Wayne Shanklin | 2:58 |
| 2. | "Love Attack" | Stephen Taylor; Heather Taylor | 3:12 |
| 3. | "I Might" | Barry Guard; Sulsh; Leathwood | 3:05 |
| 4. | "Yes I Do" | Barry Guard; Sulsh; Leathwood | 3:06 |
| 5. | "Pink Champagne" | S. Taylor; H. Taylor | 3:22 |
| 6. | "My Cutie Cutie" | Stevens; Harwood | 2:35 |
| 7. | "Radio" | Heatlie; Campbell | 3:30 |
| 8. | "I Can Help" | Billy Swan | 2:45 |
| 9. | "Trouble" | Alecia Moore; Tim Armstrong | 3:01 |
| 10. | "Now Listen" | Stevens; Cliff Masterson; Tim Woodcock | 3:25 |
| 11. | "Last Man Alive" (radio mix) | Richard Hymas; Ben Waters | 3:29 |
| 12. | "Down into Muddy Water" (radio mix) | Linde | 3:20 |
| 13. | "Down in the Hole" (radio mix) | Stevens; Sue Davies; John David | 3:15 |
| 14. | "Wild at Heart" (Neros single version) | Bo Walton; David | 3:12 |
| 15. | "Blue Christmas" | Billy Hayes; Jay W. Johnson | 2:43 |
| 16. | "Merry Christmas Everyone" | Heatlie | 3:40 |
| 17. | "The Best Christmas of Them All" | Stevens; Ron Anderson | 3:25 |
| 18. | "I’ll Be Home This Christmas" | Stevens; Harwood | 2:48 |
| 19. | "Echoes of Merry Christmas Everyone" | Heatlie | 3:00 |
| Total length: | | | 59:51 |

=== LP ===
Side one
| No. | Title | Writer(s) | Length |
|---|---|---|---|
| 1. | "Never" | Fell | 2:50 |
| 2. | "Somebody Touched Me" | Ertegun | 2:40 |
| 3. | "Treat Her Right" | Head; Kurtz | 3:34 |
| 4. | "Hot Dog" | Owens; Denny Dedmon | 2:36 |
| 5. | "Marie, Marie" | Alvin | 2:47 |
| 6. | "This Ole House" | Hamblen | 3:07 |
| 7. | "You Drive Me Crazy" | Harwood | 2:51 |

Side two
| No. | Title | Writer(s) | Length |
|---|---|---|---|
| 1. | "Green Door" | Davie; Moore | 3:13 |
| 2. | "It's Raining" | Toussaint | 3:19 |
| 3. | "Oh Julie" | Stevens | 2:35 |
| 4. | "Give Me Your Heart Tonight" | Livsey | 3:08 |
| 5. | "It's Late" | Burnette | 2:04 |
| 6. | "Cry Just a Little Bit" | Heatlie | 3:14 |
| 7. | "A Love Worth Waiting For" | Sulsh; Leathwood | 3:23 |

Side three
| No. | Title | Writer(s) | Length |
|---|---|---|---|
| 1. | "A Letter to You" | Linde | 3:14 |
| 2. | "Teardrops" | Stevens | 3:58 |
| 3. | "Turning Away" | Krekel | 3:24 |
| 4. | "Come See About Me" | Holland–Dozier–Holland | 3:25 |
| 5. | "Feel the Need in Me" | Tilmon | 3:03 |
| 6. | "Love Attack" | S. Taylor; H. Taylor | 3:12 |

Side four
| No. | Title | Writer(s) | Length |
|---|---|---|---|
| 1. | "Radio" | Heatlie; Campbell | 3:30 |
| 2. | "Trouble" | Moore; Armstrong | 3:01 |
| 3. | "Now Listen" | Stevens; Masterson; Tim Woodcock | 3:25 |
| 4. | "Last Man Alive" (radio mix) | Hymas; Waters | 3:29 |
| 5. | "Down in the Hole" (radio mix) | Stevens; Davies; David | 3:15 |
| 6. | "Merry Christmas Everyone" | Heatlie | 3:40 |
| Total length: | | | 81:57 |

== Charts ==
| Chart (2020) | Peak position |
|---|---|
| Austrian Albums (Ö3 Austria) | 68 |
| German Albums (Offizielle Top 100) | 88 |
| Irish Albums (IRMA) | 86 |
| Scottish Albums (OCC) | 8 |
| UK Albums (OCC) | 10 |
| UK Album Downloads (OCC) | 40 |
| UK Independent Albums (OCC) | 1 |

== Certifications ==
Certifications and sales for Singled Out
| Region | Certification | Certified units/sales |
|---|---|---|
| United Kingdom (BPI) | Silver | 60,000^{‡} |
^{‡} Sales+streaming figures based on certification alone.
