= Let's Boogie =

Studio album by Shakin' Stevens
- Released: 19 October 1987
- Recorded: 1986–1987
- Venue: London Palladium, London
- Studio: Master Rock, London; Maison Rouge, London; Mayfair, London; Sarm, London
- Genre: Rock and roll; pop
- Length: 39:31
- Label: Epic
- Producer: Stuart Colman; Shakin' Stevens; Carey Taylor; Mike Leander; John Springate; Christopher Neil

Shakin' Stevens chronology
Lipstick, Powder and Paint (1985)	Let's Boogie (1987)	A Whole Lotta Shaky (1988)

Singles from Let's Boogie
- 1. "Because I Love You" Released: 20 October 1986; 2. "A Little Boogie Woogie (In the Back of My Mind)" Released: 15 June 1987; 3. "Come See About Me" Released: 7 September 1987; 4. "What Do You Want to Make Those Eyes at Me For" Released: 16 November 1987

Professional ratings
Review scores
Source	Rating
New Musical Express	3/10

Let's Boogie is an album by the Welsh rock and roll singer Shakin' Stevens, released in October 1987 by Epic Records. It peaked at number 59 on the UK Albums Chart.

== Release and content ==
The album is split into a studio side and a live side. Of the five studio tracks, four were released as singles, all becoming Top-40 hits in the UK, with "What Do You Want to Make Those Eyes at Me For" charting the highest at number 5, which was his last Top-10 single until the re-entry of "Merry Christmas Everyone" in 2018.

The second side, titled 'The Hits Keep Coming...' is a medley of Stevens' previous hits, recorded live at the London Palladium on 7 December 1986. On the original release of the album, the individual songs are chaptered. However, on the 2009 re-release of the album as part of The Epic Masters box set, the medley is listed in its 'correct' format as one 23-minute track. Also different on the 2009 release of the album is that "What Do You Want to Make Those Eyes at Me For" is the single mix of the song; the album version "was a re-recording with a change in producer and musicians".

Upon release in October, the album charted for one week at number 66. However, with the success of "What Do You Want to Make Those Eyes At Me For", the album re-entered the charts in December for six weeks, peaking at number 59.

== Track listing ==
Side one
No.	Title	Writer(s)	Length
1.	"Come See About Me"	Brian Holland; Lamont Dozier; Edward Holland, Jr.	3:24
2.	"Forever You"	Gary Sulsh; Stuart Leathwood	3:22
3.	"A Little Boogie Woogie (In the Back of My Mind)"	Mike Leander; Eddie Seago; Gary Glitter	3:29
4.	"Because I Love You"	Gordon Campbell	3:18
5.	"What Do You Want to Make Those Eyes at Me For"	Joseph McCarthy; Howard Johnson; James V. Monaco	3:00

Side two: The Hits Keep Coming...
No.	Title	Writer(s)	Length
6.	"Cry Just a Little Bit"	Bob Heatlie	2:40
7.	"You Drive Me Crazy"	Ronnie Harwood	0:31
8.	"A Rockin' Good Way"	Brook Benton; Clyde Otis; Luchi DeJesus	0:51
9.	"Give Me Your Heart Tonight"	Billy Livsey	0:58
10.	"A Love Worth Waiting For"	Sulsh; Leathwood	1:04
11.	"Green Door"	Bob Davie; Marvin Moore	1:05
12.	"I'll Be Satisfied"	Berry Gordy, Jr.; Tyran Carlo	1:05
13.	"A Letter to You"	Dennis Linde	1:09
14.	"Shirley"	John Fred; Tommy Bryan	1:21
15.	"Oh Julie"	Shakin' Stevens	1:06
16.	"It's Late"	Dorsey Burnette	1:05
17.	"Marie, Marie"	Dave Alvin	1:59
18.	"It's Raining"	Naomi Neville	1:42
19.	"Hot Dog"	Buck Owens; Denny Dedmon	0:50
20.	"Teardrops"	Stevens	2:16
21.	"This Ole House"	Stuart Hamblen	3:16
Total length:			39:31

2009 bonus tracks:

No.	Title	Writer(s)	Length
22.	"Tell Me One More Time" (B-side of "Because I Love You")	Stevens	3:11
23.	"If You're Gonna Cry" (B-side of "A Little Boogie Woogie (In the Back of My Mind)")	Sulsh; Leathwood	3:45

== Personnel ==
Musicians

- Shakin' Stevens – vocals
- Ian Aitken – lead guitar (2, 6–21)
- Roger McKew – lead and rhythm guitar (6–21)
- Dick Bland – bass guitar (6–21)
- Gavin Povey – piano, synthesisers (6–21)
- Chris Wyles – drums (3, 6–21)
- The Rumour Brass:
  - Ray Beavis – tenor saxophone (6–21)
  - John "Irish" Earle – baritone and tenor saxophones (6–21)
  - Chris Gower – trombone (6–21)
  - Dick Hanson – trumpet (6–21)
- Peter Van Hooke – drums (1)
- Paul "Wix" Wickens – synthesisers (4)
- Frank Ricotti – percussion (2)
- Tony Rivers – backing vocals (3, 6–21)
- Anthony Thompson – backing vocals (3, 6–21)
- Mick Clarke – backing vocals (3, 6–21)
- Marilyn David – backing vocals (1)
- Sonia Jones – backing vocals (1)
- Shirley Lewis – backing vocals (1)
- London Gospel Choir members – backing vocals (5)

Technical

- Stuart Colman – producer (1, 5)
- Carey Taylor – producer (2)
- Shakin' Stevens – producer (2), executive producer (all tracks)
- Mike Leander – producer (3)
- John Springate – producer (3)
- Christopher Neil – producer (4)
- Track 1 recorded at Master Rock Studios, London
- Track 2 recorded at Maison Rouge, London
- Tracks 3 and 4 recorded at Mayfair Studios, London
- Track 5 recorded at Sarn Studios, London
- Tracks 6–21 recorded live by The Manor Mobile
