= Greatest Hits (Shakin' Stevens album) =

Greatest hits album by Shakin' Stevens
- Released: 5 November 1984
- Recorded: 1979–1984
- Genre: Rock and roll
- Length: 54:45
- Label: Epic
- Producer: Various

Shakin' Stevens chronology
| The Bop Won't Stop (1983) | Greatest Hits (1984) | Lipstick, Powder and Paint (1985) |

Singles from Greatest Hits
- 1. "A Letter to You" Released: 3 September 1984; 2. "Teardrops" Released: 12 November 1984; 3. "Breaking Up My Heart" Released: 18 February 1985

Professional ratings
Review scores
| Source | Rating |
|---|---|
| AllMusic | 3/5 stars |
| Encyclopedia of Popular Music | 3/5 stars |

Greatest Hits, also known as Greatest Hits Volume 1, is a greatest hits album by Welsh rockabilly singer Shakin' Stevens, released in November 1984. Three singles were released from the album, all of which were Top-20 hits. The album peaked at number 8 for four weeks on the UK Albums Chart and was certified platinum by the BFI. The album was released on CD in 2001 by Sony Music.

== Track listing ==
Side one
| No. | Title | Writer(s) | Producer(s) | Length |
|---|---|---|---|---|
| 1. | "This Ole House" | Stuart Hamblen | Stuart Colman | 3:05 |
| 2. | "You Drive Me Crazy" | Ronnie Harwood | Colman | 2:51 |
| 3. | "A Letter to You" | Dennis Linde | Peter Collins | 3:10 |
| 4. | "It's Raining" | Naomi Neville | Colman | 3:19 |
| 5. | "Green Door" | Bob Davie; Marvin Moore | Colman | 3:14 |
| 6. | "Hot Dog" | Buck Owens; Denny Dedmon | Mike Hurst | 2:36 |
| 7. | "Teardrops" | Shakin' Stevens | Stevens; Richard Anthony Hewson; Christopher Neil | 3:55 |
| 8. | "Breaking Up My Heart" | Bob Heatlie | Collins | 3:58 |
| 9. | "Oh Julie" | Stevens | Colman | 2:30 |

Side two
| No. | Title | Writer(s) | Producer(s) | Length |
|---|---|---|---|---|
| 10. | "Marie, Marie" | Dave Alvin | Colman | 2:45 |
| 11. | "A Love Worth Waiting For" | Gary Sulsh; Stuart Leathwood | Hewson; Stevens | 3:20 |
| 12. | "It's Late" | Dorsey Burnette | Neil | 2:03 |
| 13. | "Give Me Your Heart Tonight" | Billy Livsey | Colman | 3:05 |
| 14. | "Shirley" | John Fred; Tommy Bryan | Colman | 2:49 |
| 15. | "Blue Christmas" | Billy Hayes; Jay W. Johnson | Colman | 2:45 |
| 16. | "Cry Just a Little Bit" | Heatlie | Neil | 3:13 |
| 17. | "A Rockin' Good Way (To Mess Around and Fall in Love)" (with Bonnie Tyler) | Brook Benton; Clyde Otis; Luchi DeJesus | Neil | 2:55 |
| 18. | "I'll Be Satisfied" | Berry Gordy; Tyran Carlo | Colman | 3:12 |
| Total length: | | | | 54:45 |

== Charts ==
| Chart (1984–85) | Peak position |
|---|---|
| Australia (Kent Music Report) | 83 |
| German Albums (Offizielle Top 100) | 56 |
| UK Albums (OCC) | 8 |

== Certifications and sales ==
| Region | Certification | Certified units/sales |
|---|---|---|
| United Kingdom (BPI) | Platinum | 300,000^{^} |
^{^} Shipments figures based on certification alone.
