= List of number-one singles of 1981 (Ireland) =

This is a list of singles which have reached number one on the Irish Singles Chart in 1981.

Week ending	Song	Artist	Ref.
3 January	"There's No-one Quite Like Grandma"	St Winifred's School Choir	
10 January	"(Just Like) Starting Over"	John Lennon	
17 January	"(Just Like) Starting Over"	John Lennon	
24 January	"(Just Like) Starting Over"	John Lennon	
31 January	"Imagine"	John Lennon	
7 February	"Woman"	John Lennon	
14 February	"Woman"	John Lennon	
21 February	"Woman"	John Lennon	
28 February	"Shaddap You Face"	Joe Dolce	
7 March	"Shaddap You Face"	Joe Dolce	
14 March	"Shaddap You Face"	Joe Dolce	
21 March	"Vienna"	Ultravox	
28 March	"More and More"	Joe Dolan	
4 April	"This Ole House"	Shakin' Stevens	
11 April	"This Ole House"	Shakin' Stevens	
18 April	"This Ole House"	Shakin' Stevens	
25 April	"Making Your Mind Up"	Bucks Fizz	
2 May	"Making Your Mind Up"	Bucks Fizz	
9 May	"Stars on 45"	Starsound	
16 May	"Stars on 45"	Starsound	
23 May	"You Drive Me Crazy"	Shakin' Stevens	
30 May	"You Drive Me Crazy"	Shakin' Stevens	
6 June	"You Drive Me Crazy"	Shakin' Stevens	
13 June	"You Drive Me Crazy"	Shakin' Stevens	
20 June	"You Drive Me Crazy"	Shakin' Stevens	
27 June	"You Drive Me Crazy"	Shakin' Stevens	
4 July	"One Day in Your Life"	Michael Jackson	
11 July	"One Day in Your Life"	Michael Jackson	
18 July	"When You Were Sweet Sixteen"	The Fureys and Davy Arthur	
25 July	"Streets of New York"	The Wolfe Tones	
1 August	"Streets of New York"	The Wolfe Tones	
8 August	"Streets of New York"	The Wolfe Tones	
15 August	"Green Door"	Shakin' Stevens	
22 August	"Green Door"	Shakin' Stevens	
29 August	"Green Door"	Shakin' Stevens	
5 September	"Green Door"	Shakin' Stevens	
12 September	"A Bunch of Thyme"	Foster and Allen	
19 September	"Japanese Boy"	Aneka	
26 September	"Prince Charming"	Adam and the Ants	
3 October	"Prince Charming"	Adam and the Ants	
10 October	"Hands Up (Give Me Your Heart)"	Ottawan	
17 October	"Hands Up (Give Me Your Heart)"	Ottawan	
24 October	"It's My Party"	Dave Stewart and Barbara Gaskin	
31 October	"It's My Party"	Dave Stewart and Barbara Gaskin	
7 November	"It's My Party"	Dave Stewart and Barbara Gaskin	
14 November	"It's My Party"	Dave Stewart and Barbara Gaskin	
21 November	"Every Little Thing She Does Is Magic"	The Police	
28 November	"Begin the Beguine"	Julio Iglesias	
5 December	"Begin the Beguine"	Julio Iglesias	
12 December	"Begin the Beguine"	Julio Iglesias	
19 December	"Don't You Want Me"	The Human League	
26 December	"One of Us"	ABBA	

- 24 Number Ones
- Most weeks at No.1 (song): "You Drive Me Crazy" - Shakin' Stevens (6)
- Most weeks at Number One (artist): Shakin' Stevens (13)
- Most No.1s: John Lennon, Shakin' Stevens (3)

== See also ==
- 1981 in music
- Irish Singles Chart
- List of artists who reached number one in Ireland
