= Love Me Tonight (disambiguation) =

Love Me Tonight is a 1932 movie musical by Rodgers and Hart, as well as its title song and hit for Jeanette MacDonald.

Love Me Tonight may also refer to:

- "Love Me Tonight" (Tom Jones song), 1969
- "Love Me Tonight" (Angelica Agurbash song), 2005 Belarus Eurovision entry
- "Love Me Tonight", 1932 song by Bing Crosby with music by Victor Young, covered by Mildred Bailey, Annette Henshaw and Art Jarrett
- "Love Me Tonight", song by Trini Lopez
- "Love Me Tonight", song by Shakin' Stevens from The Bop Won't Stop
- "Love Me Tonight", hit song by Head East
