= Lipstick Powder and Paint =

Studio album by Shakin' Stevens
- Released: 4 November 1985
- Recorded: 1984–1985
- Studios: Maison Rouge, London; Eden Studios, London
- Genre: Rock and roll
- Length: 34:30
- Label: Epic
- Producers: Dave Edmunds; Shakin' Stevens

Shakin' Stevens chronology
The Bop Won't Stop (1983)	Lipstick Powder and Paint (1985)	Let's Boogie (1987)

Singles from Lipstick Powder and Paint
- 1. "Lipstick Powder and Paint" Released: 30 September 1985; 2. "Turning Away" Released: 27 January 1986

Professional ratings
Review scores
Source	Rating
Encyclopedia of Popular Music	3/5 stars
Number One	negative
Smash Hits	6/10 stars

Lipstick Powder and Paint is an album by Welsh rock and roll singer Shakin' Stevens, released in November 1985 by Epic Records. It peaked at number 37 on the UK Albums Chart.

== Release ==
Only two singles were released from the album: the title track, a cover of Big Joe Turner's "Lipstick, Powder and Paint", and a cover of the Tim Krekel song "Turning Away" (also covered by Crystal Gayle). Neither of these reached the Top-Ten in the UK, making it Stevens' first album since Take One! (1980) not to have a Top-Ten single. Despite this, in between the release of the two singles, Stevens released "Merry Christmas Everyone", which topped the charts.

Unlike with his previous album, The Bop Won't Stop, Epic decided not to release the album on CD, so it was not until the 2009 Epic Masters box set that the album was officially released on CD. The box set has several bonus tracks, including two singles, "Teardrops" and "Breaking Up My Heart", that had been released from Stevens' Greatest Hits album.

On both the original release and the box set, "Don't Lie to Me" is credited to Chuck Berry. However, the song, actually called "Don't You Lie to Me", was written and originally sung by Hudson Whittaker (under the name Tampa Red).

== Reception ==
Reviewing for Number One, Karen Swayne wrote that the album "has the current hit, plus variations on the sanitised rock 'n' rolling theme. The lyrical concerns are good loving, bad loving and good loving gone bad, and Shaky puts about the same lack of emotion into each track." Swayne also wrote that Stevens' "legions of fans will buy this anyway, and defend him loyally to any non-believers."

Sally Gethin for Smash Hits was more positive about the album, giving it a six out of ten, and writing that Stevens' "may not be creaming off the catchiest numbers any more... but a new Shaky album is as warm and reliable as sinking into your favourite bubbly bath. Predictable melodies are crooned to perfection, upbeat party numbers dunked in that familiar Elvis Presley coating."

== Track listing ==
Side one
No.	Title	Writer(s)	Length
1.	"Lipstick Powder and Paint"	Jesse Stone	2:43
2.	"Bad Reputation"	Gordon Campbell	2:27
3.	"Don't Lie to Me"	Hudson Whittaker	3:20
4.	"I'm Leaving You"	Gavin Povey; Vincent Laurentis	2:59
5.	"The Shape I'm In"	Lee Cathy; Otis Blackwell	2:11
6.	"Don't Knock Upon My Door"	Billy Fury	1:48

Side two
No.	Title	Writer(s)	Length
7.	"Turning Away"	Tim Krekel	3:23
8.	"Love You Out Loud"	Gerald Milne	3:12
9.	"As Long as I Have You"	Shakin' Stevens	3:21
10.	"With My Heart"	Bruce Roberts; Darrell Edwards; Stevens	2:44
11.	"Ain't It a Shame (You Win Again)"	Roger Dexter	3:25
12.	"So Long Baby Goodbye"	Dave Alvin	2:57
Total length:			34:30

2009 bonus tracks:

No.	Title	Writer(s)	Length
13.	"Teardrops" (featuring Hank Marvin)	Stevens	3:57
14.	"You Shake Me Up" (B-side of "Teardrops")	Gary Sulsh; Stuart Leathwood	2:57
15.	"Breaking Up My Heart"	Bob Heatlie	3:57
16.	"I'll Give You My Heart" (B-side of "Lipstick, Powder and Paint")	Stevens	2:58

== Personnel ==
Musicians

- Shakin' Stevens – vocals
- Ian Aitken – lead guitar
- Roger McKew – lead and rhythm guitar
- Dick Bland – bass guitar
- Chris Wyles – drums
- Frank Ricotti – percussion
- The Rumour Brass:
  - Ray Beavis – tenor saxophone
  - John "Irish" Earle – baritone and tenor saxophones
  - Chris Gower – trombone
  - Dick Hanson – trumpet
- Tony Rivers – backing vocals
- Stu Calver – backing vocals
- Mick Clarke – backing vocals
- John Perry – backing vocals
- Marilyn David – backing vocals (8)
- Sonia Jones – backing vocals (8)
- Tessa Niles – backing vocals (8)

Technical

- Carey Taylor – engineer
- Neill King – engineer (9, 10)
- Dave Edmunds – producer (all except 9, 10)
- Shakin' Stevens – executive producer, producer (9, 10)
- Bill Smith Studio – cover design
- Terence Donovan – photography
- Andrew Douglas – back cover photography

== Charts ==
Chart (1985)	Peak position
German Albums (Offizielle Top 100)	59
Swiss Albums (Schweizer Hitparade)	27
UK Albums (Official Charts)	37

== Certifications and sales ==
Region	Certification	Certified units/sales
United Kingdom (BPI)	Gold	100,000^{^}
^{^} Shipments figures based on certification alone.
