= Do You Really Love Me Too =

1963 song

"Do You Really Love Me Too (Fool's Errand)"

Single by Billy Fury
- B-side: "What Am I Gonna Do"
- Released: 13 December 1963
- Recorded: 13 November 1963
- Studio: Decca Studios, London
- Genre: Pop
- Length: 2:00
- Label: Decca
- Songwriter(s): Mark Barkan; Ben Raleigh
- Producer(s): Mike Leander; Billtone

Billy Fury singles chronology
"Somebody Else's Girl" (1963)	"Do You Really Love Me Too (Fool's Errand)" (1963)	"I Will" (1964)

"Do You Really Love Me Too" is a song written by Mark Barkan and Ben Raleigh and first released by American pop singer Barbara Chandler as the flip side to "I Live To Love You" in October 1963. Originally called "Fool's Errand", it was renamed "Do You Really Love Me Too" on the UK release of the single in December 1963.

== Billy Fury version ==
A week after Chandler's version was released in the UK, English singer Billy Fury released his own version, titled "Do You Really Love Me Too (Fool's Errand)", as a single, which peaked at number 13 on the Record Retailer Top 50.

=== Release and reception ===
"Do You Really Love Me Too (Fool's Errand)" was released with the B-side "What Am I Gonna Do", a song written by Neil Sedaka and Howard Greenfield, first recorded by Sedaka for his debut album Neil Sedaka Sings Little Devil and His Other Hits, but was first released as a single by Jimmy Clanton.

Reviewing for Disc, Don Nicholl wrote that "Fury sings it firmly and maintains a good beaty pace in front of Bill Shepherd's orchestral accompaniment. The strings, rhythm and girl voices should raft Billy into the sellers yet again". Reviewing for Pop Weekly, Peter Aldersley wrote that "the backing moves along with strength but it is the kind of song which must be allowed to grow on one's ears. There is very little originality in the composition itself and I could have been with a little extra bite from Billy".

=== Track listing ===
7": Decca / F 11701

1. "Do You Really Love Me Too (Fool's Errand)" – 2:00
2. "What Am I Gonna Do" – 2:02

=== Charts ===
Chart (1964)	Peak position
UK Disc Top 30	14
UK Melody Maker Top 50	13
UK New Musical Express Top 30	15
UK Record Retailer Top 50	13

== Other cover versions ==
- In 1988, Shakin' Stevens covered the song on his album A Whole Lotta Shaky.
