= Santaworld =

Theme park in Sweden

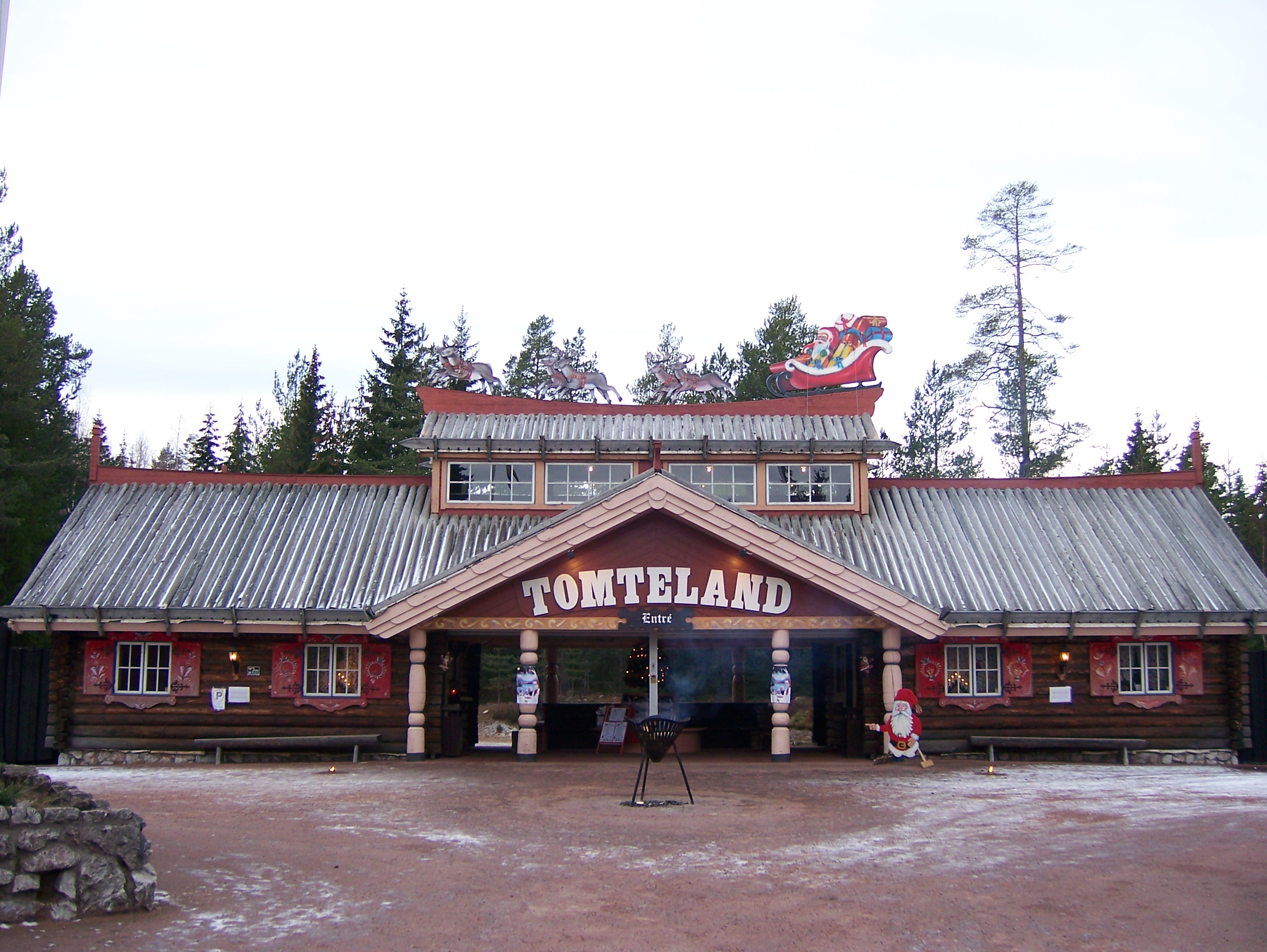
- Santaworld
- Interactive map of Santaworld
- Location: Gesunda Mountain, Sweden
- Coordinates: 60.8794°N 14.5178°E
- Status: Operating
- Opened: 8 December 1984
- Website: www.tomteland.se

Santaworld (Swedish: Tomteland) is a theme park on the Gesunda Mountain south of Mora, Sweden. It was opened on 8 December 1984.

It featured prominently in the music video to Shakin' Stevens's 1985 single "Merry Christmas Everyone".
