= Japanese Boy =

1981 single by Aneka

Single by Aneka

from the album Aneka
- B-side: "Ae Fond Kiss"
- Released: July 1981
- Genre: Disco; new wave
- Length: 3:57
- Label: Hansa; Handshake (US)
- Songwriter: Bob Heatlie
- Producers: Bob Heatlie; Neil Ross

Aneka singles chronology
"Japanese Boy" (1981)	"Little Lady" (1981)

Music video
- "Japanese Boy" (TopPop, 1981) on YouTube

"Japanese Boy" is a single by Scottish singer Aneka, which was released by Hansa Records in July 1981. The song became her highest-charting release, reaching number one in several countries, including the United Kingdom. The song's success would eventually lead audiences to associate Aneka closely with both the lyrics' subject matter as well as the kimono that she wore during some televised performances of the song, associations that she found difficult to discard as her career proceeded.

== Background ==
Written by Bob Heatlie and produced by Neil Ross, the song was recorded by Scottish folk singer Mary Sandeman. Before then, Heatlie and Sandeman had worked together on several Scottish folk albums. Eventually, Sandeman told Heatlie that she wanted to sing a pop song, but he was reluctant to write something for her because she did not possess the qualities of a pop musician. Despite constant reminders, he forgot to write a song. One day, Sandeman called him to let him know that she had set up an appointment to record her new song, which Heatlie had not written yet. Working quickly, he wrote the chorus first, then stitched together several lyrics from songs he had previously composed.

After recording the demo for "Japanese Boy", Germany's Hansa Records agreed to release the single after multiple rejections. Heatlie and Sandeman began to work on Sandeman's image, dressing her in a wig and kimono. Realising that her name did not fit the song, she and Heatlie decided to come up with a name to put to the single. Leafing through the telephone directory, they came upon the name of Anika, changing the middle letter to "e" for Sandeman's stage name. Following its release, the song became a hit when it eventually reached No. 1 on the UK Singles Chart in August 1981. The song went on to become a hit all over Europe and beyond, although according to Sandeman, it failed to chart in Japan because, according to the Japanese office of Hansa, the song "sounded too Chinese."

The success of the single proved to be a problem, as Sandeman was left with a dilemma of what to do as a follow-up, now that her image was so firmly associated with one song. She modified her image and kept the Aneka name, but future single releases failed to chart highly in the UK, although she did score two follow-up hits in many countries in Europe.

The song was released on 7-inch vinyl and as an extended 12-inch vinyl version and featured on Aneka's debut – and only – album, released later in 1981. "Japanese Boy" sold almost half a million copies in the UK, making it one of the best-selling singles of 1981, and the second-best seller by a solo female artist (behind Kim Wilde's "Kids in America").

Sandeman featured in a 2006 Channel 4 documentary titled Bring Back the One Hit Wonders. Justin Lee Collins attempted to organise a one-off performance of as many one hit wonders as possible but despite getting in touch with Sandeman, she declined to take part as she did not want to travel to London from her home in Scotland and had "no desire" to perform the song.

== Charts ==
=== Weekly charts ===
Weekly chart performance for "Japanese Boy"
Chart (1981–1982)	Peak position
Australia (Kent Music Report)	57
Austria (Ö3 Austria Top 40)	4
Belgium (Ultratop 50 Flanders)	1
Canada Top Singles (RPM)	42
Finland (Suomen virallinen lista)	1
France (IFOP)	4
Ireland (IRMA)	1
Israel	5
Italy (Musica e dischi)	18
Netherlands (Dutch Top 40)	7
Netherlands (Single Top 100)	7
Norway (VG-lista)	4
South Africa (Springbok Radio)	19
Sweden (Sverigetopplistan)	1
Switzerland (Schweizer Hitparade)	1
UK Singles (Official Charts)	1
US Billboard Disco Top 80	15
West Germany (GfK)	3

=== Year-end charts ===
Annual chart rankings for "Japanese Boy"
Chart (1981)	Position
Belgium (Ultratop 50 Flanders)	12
Switzerland (Schweizer Hitparade)	7
UK Singles (OCC)	22
West Germany (Official German Charts)	68

== Popular culture ==
The song was prominently featured in Grand Theft Auto: Vice City on the in game pop station Flash FM.

Due to the international popularity of the song, Cantopop singer Leslie Cheung recorded a cover version (不管您是誰) on his 1983 album, The Wind Blows On (風繼續吹).

Ironically, Japanese singer Yukano Yamaguchi (山口由佳乃) recorded a cover version Chinese Boy (チャイニーズ・ボーイ) in 1983.

Finally, Chinese singer Zhang Qiang (张蔷) recorded a Mandarin cover version (年轻时代) on her album That Night (那天晚上) in 1986. It was later covered by Taiwanese group S.H.E on their album Encore.

Swedish group Smile.dk also covered the song on their 2008 album Party Around The World.

Cambodian singer Pich Sophea recorded a Khmer-language cover of the song, which was included on the compilation album RHM Vol. 376: Best of the Year (2009) released by Rasmey Hang Meas.

== See also ==
- List of number-one singles of 1981 (Ireland)
- List of number-one singles and albums in Sweden
- List of number-one singles of the 1980s (Switzerland)
- List of UK Singles Chart number ones of the 1980s
