= There Are Two Kinds of Music... Rock 'n' Roll =

Studio album by Shakin' Stevens
- Released: 8 October 1990
- Recorded: 1989–1990
- Studio: PWL, London
- Genre: Rock and roll; pop
- Label: Telstar; Epic
- Producer: Pete Hammond

Shakin' Stevens chronology
A Whole Lotta Shaky (1988)	There Are Two Kinds of Music... Rock 'n' Roll (1990)	Merry Christmas Everyone (1991)

Singles from There Are Two Kinds of Music... Rock 'n' Roll
- 1. "Love Attack" Released: 1 May 1989; 2. "I Might" Released: 12 February 1990; 3. "Yes I Do" Released: 30 April 1990; 4. "Pink Champagne" Released: 6 August 1990; 5. "My Cutie Cutie" Released: 1 October 1990

There Are Two Kinds of Music... Rock 'n' Roll is an album by Welsh rock and roll singer Shakin' Stevens, released in October 1990. It was released by Telstar Records in the UK and by Epic Records in Europe. It peaked at number 65 on the UK Albums Chart.

== Release and content ==
In an attempt to modernise his music, Stevens recorded the album with producer Pete Hammond, known for his work with Stock Aitken Waterman. There were five singles released from the album. The first two, "Love Attack" and "I Might" were UK Top-30 hits; however the final three did not chart so highly, with "Pink Champagne" charting the highest at number 59. Unlike Stevens' previous albums, this album only includes a few cover songs: "Tear It Up", originally by Johnny Burnette, "If I Lose You", originally by Billy Fury, and "Queen of the Hop", originally by Bobby Darin.

On the original album release, all the tracks are credited to being produced by Hammond. However, on the 2009 release of the album as part of The Epic Masters box set, this is revealed to not be the case. "Love Attack" (produced by Stevens and Carey Taylor) and "Rockin' the Night Away" (no producer given) were not produced by Hammond, but he did remix both of them for the album. The box set includes several bonus tracks: the single version of "Love Attack", three B-sides and the single "Radio". "Radio" was released in September 1992 to promote The Epic Years and was Stevens' last official single released by Epic. The single, produced by Rod Argent and Peter Van Hooke, features Queen member Roger Taylor on drums as well as Argent on keyboards.

== Track listing ==
No.	Title	Writer(s)	Length
1.	"Love Attack"	Steve Taylor; Heather Taylor	3:11
2.	"I Might"	Gary Sulsh; Stuart Leathwood; Barrie Guard	3:02
3.	"Yes I Do"	Sulsh; Leathwood	3:06
4.	"You Shake Me Up"	Sulsh; Leathwood	2:54
5.	"Tell Me"	Steve Taylor; Heather Taylor	2:57
6.	"Tear It Up"	Paul Burlison; Dorsey Burnette; Johnny Burnette	2:22
7.	"My Cutie Cutie"	Ronnie Harwood	2:34
8.	"The Night Time Is the Right Time"	T. Parkhill	4:00
9.	"Pink Champagne"	Steve Taylor; Heather Taylor	3:21
10.	"If I Lose You"	Billy Fury	2:58
11.	"Queen of the Hop"	Woody Harris	2:40
12.	"Rockin' the Night Away"	Shakin' Stevens	2:56

2009 bonus tracks:

No.	Title	Writer(s)	Length
13.	"Love Attack" (Single Version)	Steve Taylor; Heather Taylor	3:12
14.	"Love Won't Stop" (B-side of "I Might")	Stevens	2:37
15.	"Radio" (Single Version)	Bob Heatlie; Gordon Campbell	3:24
16.	"Radio" (Acoustic; B-side of 12" "Radio")	Heatlie; Campbell	3:29
17.	"Oh Baby" (Outtake; B-side of "Radio")	Stevens	2:35

== Personnel ==
Technical

- Gordon Dennis – engineer
- The Artifex Studio – design, artwork
- Eugene Adebari – photography
- Shakin' Stevens – compiling
