= It Takes All Night Long =

Single by Gary Glitter

from the album Silver Star
- B-side: "It Takes All Night Long (Part II)"
- Released: 1976
- Genre: Glam rock; disco
- Length: 3:04 (Single Version); 5:16 (Album Version)
- Label: Arista
- Songwriter(s): Gary Glitter; Mike Leander; Eddie (Edward John) Seago
- Producer(s): Mike Leander

Gary Glitter singles chronology
"1976" (You Belong to Me)	"It Takes All Night Long" (1976)	"A Little Boogie Woogie in the Back of My Mind" (1977)

"It Takes All Night Long" is a song by the English glam rock singer Gary Glitter, written by Glitter with Mike Leander and Eddie (Edward John) Seago and produced by Mike Leander. It was released as the second single from his fourth studio album, Silver Star (1977), peaking at No. 25 on the UK Singles Chart.

On the single version of "It Takes All Night Long", the A–side is Part 1, lasting 3:04, while the B–side is Part 2, lasting 2:43. The album version of "It Takes All Night Long", on the Silver Star album, is one song lasting 5:16, which includes the whole of Part 1 (3:04), plus 2:12 out of the 2:43 from Part 2.

== Track listing ==
1. "It Takes All Night Long (Part 1)" – 3:04
2. "It Takes All Night Long (Part 2)" – 2:43

== Chart performance ==
Chart	Position
Ireland (IRMA)	28
Netherlands (Dutch Top 40)	19
UK Singles Chart	25

http://www.dutchcharts.nl/weekchart.asp?cat=st&date=19770319&year=1977
