= The Bop Won't Stop =

Studio album by Shakin' Stevens
- Released: 18 November 1983
- Recorded: 1983
- Studios: Eden Studios, London
- Genres: Rock and roll; pop
- Length: 33:33
- Label: Epic
- Producers: Christopher Neil; Richard Anthony Hewson; Shakin' Stevens

Shakin' Stevens chronology
Give Me Your Heart Tonight (1982)	The Bop Won't Stop (1983)	Lipstick, Powder and Paint (1985)

Singles from Give Me Your Heart Tonight
- 1. "It's Late" Released: 15 July 1983; 2. "Cry Just a Little Bit" Released: 4 November 1983; 3. "A Rockin' Good Way" Released: 30 December 1983; 4. "A Love Worth Waiting For" Released: 12 March 1984

Professional ratings
Review scores
Source	Rating
Encyclopedia of Popular Music	2/5 stars
Number One	4/5 stars
Smash Hits	4/10 stars

The Bop Won't Stop is an album by Welsh rock and roll singer Shakin' Stevens, released in November 1983 by Epic Records. Compared to his previous albums, this album was not as successful, only peaking at number 21 on the UK Albums Chart despite the success of its singles.

== Release ==
The album spawned three UK Top-5 singles: "Cry Just a Little Bit", "A Rockin' Good Way" (a duet with Bonnie Tyler) and "A Love Worth Waiting For". A cover of Ricky Nelson's "It's Late" was also released, peaking at number 11 in the UK. In Mexico, a cover of Jerry Williams & Roadwork's "Diddle I" was released as a single in 1983, with the B-side "Love Me Tonight".

In the US and Canada, like with Stevens' previous album Give Me Your Heart Tonight, The Bop Won't Stop was released with only 10 tracks, omitting "Livin' Lovin' Wreck" and "It's Late".

The album became Stevens' first CD release in 1984. In 2009, it was re-released on CD as part of The Epic Masters box set, which included bonus tracks. The bonus tracks were two B-sides and two singles: a cover of "Your Ma Said You Cried in Your Sleep Last Night", which was only released in Europe, and also a cover of "A Letter to You" which was released as a single from Stevens' Greatest Hits album.

== Reception ==
Reviewing the album for Number One, James McGregor gave the album a four out of five and wrote "Honour where honours due. Somehow Shaky's put all the pieces together and turned rockabilly and '50s crooning into an '80s mix that anybody can enjoy. His latest offering is a perfect lightweight performance, undoctored, urgent, and just the right side of tongue in cheek."

Reviewing for Smash Hits, Linda Duff gave the album four out of ten, describing it as "Nothing new or even remotely startling. Shaky rattles out the same old song – literally, even his self-penned tracks are ripped off from his own previous hits."

== Track listing ==
Side one
No.	Title	Writer(s)	Length
1.	"The Bop Won't Stop"	Steve Tatler	2:35
2.	"Why Do You Treat Me This Way?"	Shakin' Stevens	2:27
3.	"Diddle I"	Caj Högberg; Dougie Lawton	2:59
4.	"Don't Be Two Faced"	Tom Bee	3:12
5.	"Livin' Lovin' Wreck"	Otis Blackwell	2:11
6.	"A Rockin' Good Way (To Mess Around and Fall in Love)" (with Bonnie Tyler)	Brook Benton; Clyde Otis; Luchi DeJesus	2:57

Side two
No.	Title	Writer(s)	Length
7.	"Brand New Man"	Mickey Gee	2:25
8.	"Cry Just a Little Bit"	Bob Heatlie	3:11
9.	"As Long As"	Steve Markwick; Stevens	2:58
10.	"A Love Worth Waiting For"	Gary Sulsh; Stuart Leathwood	3:20
11.	"Love Me Tonight"	Stevens	3:16
12.	"It's Late"	Dorsey Burnette	2:02
Total length:			33:33

2009 bonus tracks:

No.	Title	Writer(s)	Length
13.	"It's Good for You (Baby)" (B-side of "It's Late")	Stevens	2:58
14.	"Your Ma Said You Cried in Your Sleep Last Night"	Stephen Schlaks; Robert Glazer	3:23
15.	"A Letter to You"	Dennis Linde	3:08
16.	"Come Back and Love Me" (B-side of "A Letter to You")	Stevens	2:47

== Personnel ==
Shaky's musicians

- Shakin' Stevens – vocals
- Les Davidson – lead guitar
- Roger McKew – lead and rhythm guitar
- Dick Bland – bass guitar
- Gavin Povey – piano, synthesiser
- Chris Wyles – drums
- The Rumour Brass:
  - Ray Beavis – tenor saxophone
  - John "Irish" Earle – baritone and tenor saxophones
  - Chris Gower – trombone
  - Dick Hanson – trumpet

Technical

- Neill King – engineer
- Simon Hurrell – engineer
- Christopher Neil – producer (all except 3, 7, 10)
- Richard Anthony Hewson – producer (10)
- Shakin' Stevens – producer (3, 7, 10)
- Simon Cantwell – art direction
- Alan Ballard – photography

== Charts ==
Chart (1983–84)	Peak position
Australian Albums (Kent Music Report)	73
Dutch Albums (Album Top 100)	38
German Albums (Offizielle Top 100)	24
Norwegian Albums (VG-lista)	6
Swiss Albums (Schweizer Hitparade)	12
UK Albums (Official Charts)	21

== Certifications and sales ==
Region	Certification	Certified units/sales
United Kingdom (BPI)	Gold	100,000^{^}
^{^} Shipments figures based on certification alone.
