= A Whole Lotta Shaky =

Studio album by Shakin' Stevens
- Released: 7 November 1988
- Recorded: 1981, 1987, 1988
- Studios: Eden, London; Sarm, London; Air, London; Maison Rouge, London
- Genres: Rock and roll; pop
- Length: 43:04
- Label: Epic
- Producers: Bob Heatlie; Shakin' Stevens; Carey Taylor; Stuart Colman; Christopher Neil; Dave Edmunds

Shakin' Stevens chronology
Let's Boogie (1987)	A Whole Lotta Shaky (1988)	There Are Two Kinds of Music... Rock 'n' Roll (1990)

Singles from A Whole Lotta Shaky
- 1. "How Many Tears Can You Hide" Released: 3 October 1988; 2. "True Love" Released: 28 November 1988; 3. "Jezebel" Released: 6 February 1989

A Whole Lotta Shaky is an album by Welsh rock and roll singer Shakin' Stevens, released in November 1988 by Epic Records. It peaked at number 42 on the UK Albums Chart.

== Release and content ==
The album features three songs recorded in 1981, "Mona Lisa" and "I'm Gonna Sit Right Down and Write Myself a Letter" from Shaky, and "Oh Julie" from Give Me Your Heart Tonight. Three singles were released from A Whole Lotta Shaky, although none of them reached the Top-20. For the single release of "Jezebel", the song was remixed and produced by the Art of Noise's J. J. Jeczalik. This remix is included on the bonus tracks of the 2009 release of the album as part of The Epic Masters box set. "What Do You Want to Make Those Eyes at Me For" appeared on Stevens' previous album Let's Boogie; however, this is the version that was released as a single.

The box set release also includes the non-album single "Feel the Need in Me", which had been released in July 1988, as well as the B-sides to the three album singles.

== Track listing ==
Side one
No.	Title	Writer(s)	Length
1.	"What Do You Want to Make Those Eyes at Me For"	Joseph McCarthy; Howard Johnson; James V. Monaco	2:49
2.	"How Many Tears Can You Hide"	Frankie Miller; Graham Lyle	3:36
3.	"Jezebel"	Wayne Shanklin	2:57
4.	"Sea of Love"	George Khoury; John Phillip Baptiste	3:05
5.	"True Love"	Cole Porter	2:44
6.	"Just One Look"	Doris Payne; Gregory Carroll	3:40
7.	"Oh Julie"	Shakin' Stevens	2:31

Side two
No.	Title	Writer(s)	Length
8.	"Do You Really Love Me Too"	Mark Barkan; Ben Raleigh	3:00
9.	"I'm Gonna Sit Right Down and Write Myself a Letter"	Fred E. Ahlert; Joe Young	3:23
10.	"Hello Josephine"	Dave Bartholomew; Fats Domino	2:51
11.	"Woman (What Have You Done to Me)"	Bob Heatlie	3:47
12.	"Heartbeat"	Gordon Campbell	2:59
13.	"Tired of Toein' the Line"	Rocky Burnette; Ron Coleman	3:26
14.	"Mona Lisa"	Jay Livingston; Ray Evans	2:16
Total length:			43:04

2009 bonus tracks:

No.	Title	Writer(s)	Length
15.	"Feel the Need in Me"	Abrim Tilmon	2:59
16.	"If I Can't Have You" (B-side of "Feel the Need in Me")	Stevens; Tony Rivers	3:20
17.	"If I Really Knew" (B-side of "How Many Tears Can You Hide")	Geoffrey Taggart; Jim Newcombe	3:18
18.	"Come On Little Girl (Chrome Sitar)" (B-side of "True Love")	Marc Bolan	3:30
19.	"Jezebel" (7" Remix)	Shanklin	2:58

== Personnel ==
Technical

- Denny Bridges – engineer (2–5, 8, 10–12)
- Rod Houison – engineer (7, 9, 14)
- Nick Froome – assistant engineer (7, 9, 14)
- Neill King – assistant engineer (7, 9, 14)
- Ted Hayton – engineer (13)
- Bob Heatlie – producer (2–5, 8, 10, 12), remixing (11)
- Shakin' Stevens – producer (1–6, 8, 10, 12), executive producer (13), remixing (13)
- Carey Taylor – producer (1, 6)
- Stuart Colman – producer (7, 9, 14)
- Christopher Neil – producer (11), additional production (5), remixing (5)
- Dave Edmunds – producer (13)
- Simon Cantwell – art direction
- The Artifex Studio – artwork
- Terry O'Neill – photography
- Track 1 recorded at Sarm Studios, London
- Track 6 recorded at Air Studios, London
- Track 13 recorded at Maison Rouge, London
- All other tracks recorded at Eden Studios, London

== Charts ==
Chart (1988–89)	Peak position
Australia (Kent Music Report)	80
UK Albums (Official Charts)	42
