= Shakin' Stevens (album) =

Studio album by Shakin' Stevens
- Released: 7 April 1978
- Recorded: 8 January 1978
- Studio: Basing Street, London
- Genre: Rock and roll
- Length: 33:37
- Label: Track
- Producer: Mike Shaw; John Fenton

Shakin' Stevens chronology
Come on Memphis! (1977)	Shakin' Stevens (1978)	Take One! (1980)

Singles from Shakin' Stevens
- 1. "Justine" Released: January 1978

Professional ratings
Review scores
Source	Rating
AllMusic	2/5 stars
Encyclopedia of Popular Music	2/5 stars

Shakin' Stevens is the debut solo album by Welsh rock and roll singer Shakin' Stevens, released in April 1978 by Track Records.

== Background and release ==
Beginning in 1969, Stevens was the frontman of the rock and roll group Shakin' Stevens and the Sunsets. However, in 1976, he was offered the chance to record some solo tracks with Track Records. Two singles, "Never" and "Somebody Touched Me", were released in March and September 1977, respectively. Neither made any impact on the UK charts, although the latter somehow crept into the Top 40 in Australia. Shortly after the release of "Somebody Touched Me", Stevens landed a leading role in Jack Good's West End musical Elvis!, playing the middle role of Elvis Presley's career alongside Tim Whitnall and P. J. Proby. With interest in Shaky now increasing, Track recorded an album hoping to capitalise on the singer's newly heightened profile.

After seeing a performance on a TV special called Don't Knock the Rock, Stevens recruited the services of group Sounds Incorporated. Joined by Stevens' old Sunsets bandmate Ace Skudder on piano, the band went into Island's Basing Street Studios on 8 January 1978. With Bob Marley recording in the next-door studio and under the musical direction of saxophonist Alan Holmes, producers Mike Shaw and John Fenton captured an album's worth of material in a single day.

Preceded by the single "Justine", issued just a few weeks after the session in January, the album Shakin' Stevens was released in April 1978. However, the record flopped, and Track Records ceased operations soon after its release. Despite this, by the end of the year, Epic Records had signed Stevens, and in the wake of his success in the 1980s, the album was re-released by Track's parent company, Polydor, in 1983.

Although the album is officially titled Shakin' Stevens, the record labels carried the instruction 'Play Loud', which has led many fans and discographers to refer to the album by this title.

== Track listing ==
Side one
No.	Title	Writer(s)	Length
1.	"You Can't Sit Down" (Instrumental)	Phil Upchurch; Dee Clark; Cornell Muldrow	2:00
2.	"I'm Ready"	Al Lewis; Sylvester Bradford; Fats Domino	2:43
3.	"So Glad You're Mine"	Arthur Crudup	2:30
4.	"Let's Dance"	Jim Lee	3:24
5.	"Till I Waltz Again With You"	Sid Prosen	3:03
6.	"Such a Night"	Lincoln Chase	2:58

Side two
No.	Title	Writer(s)	Length
7.	"Justine"	Don "Sugarcane" Harris; Dewey Terry	3:03
8.	"Baby Blue"	Gene Vincent; Bobby Jones	3:52
9.	"Wait and See"	Domino; Dave Bartholomew	2:13
10.	"Can't Believe You Wanna Leave"	Leo Price	2:53
11.	"Whole Lotta Shakin' Goin' On" / "Jenny Jenny" / "Tutti Frutti"	Sunny David; Enotris Johnson; Richard Penniman; Dorothy LaBostrie	4:58
Total length:			33:37

== Personnel ==
Musicians

- Shakin' Stevens – vocals
- Phil Palmer – guitar
- Jo Partridge – guitar
- Dick Thomas – bass
- Ace Skudder – piano
- Tony Newman – drums
- Alan Holmes – saxophones

Technical

- Phill Brown – engineer
- John Dent – mastering
- Alan Holmes – music director
- Jo Mirowski – sleeve design
- Jill Mumford – sleeve design
- Gered Mankowitz – photography
