= Lipstick, Powder and Paint (song) =

1956 single by Big Joe Turner

Single by Big Joe Turner

from the album Rockin' the Blues
- A-side: "Rock a While"
- Released: July 1956
- Recorded: February 24, 1956
- Studio: Atlantic Studios, New York
- Genre: R&B
- Length: 2:28
- Label: Atlantic
- Songwriter: Jesse Stone
- Producers: Ahmet Ertegun; Jerry Wexler

Big Joe Turner singles chronology
"Corrine, Corrina" (1956)	"Lipstick, Powder and Paint" (1956)	"Midnight Special" (1956)

"Lipstick, Powder and Paint" is a song by American blues shouter Big Joe Turner, released in July 1956 as a double A-side single with "Rock a While". It was included on the soundtrack to the 1956 film Shake, Rattle & Rock!. That year, "Lipstick, Powder and Paint" peaked at number 8 on the R&B Billboard chart, whilst the flip side "Rock a While" peaked at number 12.

== Reception ==
When reviewed in Billboard magazine, the single was described as a " two-faced powerhouse", as "both sides rock mightily, and feature the usual repeated refrain gimmick of which the shouter is so fond. Strong backing from vocal group and ork". Cash Box also described it as a "strong two-sider" and wrote that "Lipstick, Powder and Paint" is "a quick beat rocker intoned by that inimitable chanter. It is an infectious bouncer with several catch phrases that fall in catchy manner from that rolling tongue of Turner. A strong blues hunk of material with a very powerful lyric". "Rock a While" was described as "another hard hitting rocker done to a turn. Catchy, happy, jump wax. Deck moves with impact and excites".

== Personnel ==
- Joe Turner – vocals
- The Cookies – backing vocals
- Jimmy Nottingham – trumpet
- Dick Vance – trumpet
- Earle Warren – alto saxophone
- Sam Taylor – tenor saxophone
- Billy Mure – guitar
- George Barnes – guitar
- Lloyd Trotman – double bass
- Panama Francis – drums

== Shakin' Stevens version ==
"Lipstick Powder and Paint"

Single by Shakin' Stevens

from the album Lipstick Powder and Paint
- B-side: "I'll Give You My Heart" (Remix)
- Released: 30 September 1985
- Recorded: 1984–1985
- Genre: Rock and roll
- Length: 2:58
- Label: Epic
- Songwriter: Jesse Stone
- Producers: Dave Edmunds; Shakin' Stevens (executive)

Shakin' Stevens singles chronology
"Breaking Up My Heart" (1985)	"Lipstick Powder and Paint" (1985)	"Merry Christmas Everyone" (1985)

In 1985, Welsh singer Shakin' Stevens covered the song for his album of the same name. It peaked at number 11 on the UK Singles Chart. The B-side "I'll Give You My Heart" is a remixed version of the song that had featured at the B-side to Stevens' previous single "Breaking Up My Heart".

=== Track listings ===
7": Epic / A 6610 (UK)

1. "Lipstick Powder and Paint" – 2:44
2. "I'll Give You My Heart" (Remix) – 2:55

12": Epic / TA 6610 (UK)

1. "Lipstick Powder and Paint" – 2:44
2. "As Long As I Have You" – 3:19
3. "I'll Give You My Heart" (Remix) – 2:55

=== Charts ===
Chart (1985)	Peak position
Austria (Ö3 Austria Top 40)	24
Belgium (Ultratop 50 Flanders)	21
Ireland (IRMA)	11
Netherlands (Single Top 100)	48
Switzerland (Schweizer Hitparade)	22
UK Singles (OCC)	11
West Germany (GfK)	52

== Other versions ==
- In 1965, British rock and roll band Kingsize Taylor and The Dominos released a cover of the song as a single in Germany.
- In 1976, American blues singer-songwriter Delbert McClinton covered the song on his album Genuine Cowhide.
- In 1985, American blues singer Tom Principato covered the song on his debut album Smokin'.
- In 2003, American blues band Roomful of Blues covered the song on their album That's Right!.
