= A Little Boogie Woogie in the Back of My Mind =

1977 single by Gary Glitter

Single by Gary Glitter

from the album Silver Star
- B-side: "Treat of 42nd Street"
- Released: June 1977
- Genre: Glam rock; pop rock
- Length: 3:05
- Label: Arista
- Songwriters: Gary Glitter; Mike Leander; Eddie Seago
- Producer: Mike Leander

Gary Glitter singles chronology
"It Takes All Night Long" (1976)	"A Little Boogie Woogie in the Back of My Mind" (1977)	"I Dare You to Lay One on Me" (1977)

"A Little Boogie Woogie in the Back of My Mind" is a song by the English glam rock singer Gary Glitter, released in June 1977 as a single from his fourth studio album Silver Star. Glitter declared himself bankrupt in 1977 after this single and "It Takes All Night Long", both Top 40 hits, failed to improve his financial situation.

== Charts ==
Chart (1977)	Peak position
UK Singles (OCC)	31

== Shakin' Stevens version ==
"A Little Boogie Woogie (In the Back of My Mind)"

Single by Shakin' Stevens

from the album Let's Boogie
- B-side: "If You're Gonna Cry"
- Released: 15 June 1987
- Recorded: 1987
- Genre: Pop rock
- Length: 3:30
- Label: Epic
- Songwriters: Gary Glitter; Mike Leander; Eddie Seago
- Producers: Mike Leander; John Springate

Shakin' Stevens singles chronology
"Because I Love You" (1986)	"A Little Boogie Woogie (In the Back of My Mind)" (1987)	"Come See About Me" (1987)

In 1987, Welsh singer Shakin' Stevens covered the song for his album Let's Boogie. It was more successful than the original, peaking at number 12 on the UK Singles Chart.

=== Track listings ===
7": Epic / SHAKY 3 (UK)

1. "A Little Boogie Woogie (In the Back of My Mind)" – 3:30
2. "If You're Gonna Cry" – 3:43

12": Epic / SHAKY T3 (UK)

1. "A Little Boogie Woogie (In the Back of My Mind)" (Boogie Mix) – 8:40
2. "A Little Boogie Woogie (In the Back of My Mind)" (7" Version) – 3:30
3. "If You're Gonna Cry" – 3:43

=== Charts ===
Chart (1987)	Peak position
Ireland (IRMA)	9
UK Singles (OCC)	12
