= Aneka =

Scottish singer (born 1947)

- Born: Mary Sandeman; 20 November 1947 (age 78); Edinburgh, Scotland
- Genres: Pop, folk
- Occupation: Singer
- Years active: 1979–1994, 2006
- Label: Hansa International

Mary Sandeman (born 20 November 1947), better known by her former stage name Aneka (/əˈniːkə/ ə-NEE-kə), is a Scottish retired traditional singer.

In 1981, she reached number one in the UK Singles Chart with her song "Japanese Boy". She was well known for the Oriental image she took on for the song. After her brief foray into pop, she reverted to her real name and reestablished herself as an accomplished performer of Scottish traditional music.

== Career ==
=== Introducing Mary Sandeman (1979–1981) ===
Under her real name, Aneka released four EPs from 1965–1976 and several albums, with the first in 1979 titled Introducing Mary Sandeman. All feature traditional folk songs sung in both English, Scots and Scottish Gaelic. Aneka was a Gold Medal winner at The Mòd, and after her commercial success ended she dropped the Aneka name and returned to her Scottish folk roots, continuing to perform under her real name.

=== "Japanese Boy" and Aneka (1981–1983) ===
Mary Sandeman recorded the song "Japanese Boy" in 1981. Impressed with the results, her record company Hansa decided to release it as a single with full promotion. Having discovered the name Aneka in a telephone directory, Aneka devised a suitable image for her performances of the song. Released in summer 1981, "Japanese Boy" climbed the charts impressively and reached no. 1 for one week in August.

Buoyed by this success, the record company commissioned an album and looked to find a follow-up single. The song "Little Lady" was chosen, but caused some concern as to what image to use, as it was felt that a Japanese look would be inappropriate for the song as well as giving the artist a limited life-span. In the event Aneka adopted an 18th-century "lady" image, but retained the same high-pitched voice as used for her hit. The song failed to chart highly in the UK, reaching only no. 50; securing her the label of one-hit wonder.

Aneka's first pop album, entitled Aneka, was released at the same time (although she had in 1979 released an album under her own name) and featured a mix of upbeat tracks in the vein of "Japanese Boy" and a selection of slow-paced numbers, sung in her true singing voice. The album however failed to chart. In 1981, South Uist poet Dòmhnall Iain Dhonnchaidh agreed, as part of a bridge-building exercise organized by Gaelic language radio, to compose both literary translations and original lyrics set to arias from Mozart and Verdi operas. Mary Sandeman ultimately made "Nìghneagan Òga", his translation of Voi Che Sapete from Mozart's The Marriage of Figaro, a regular part of her repertoire. Sandeman not only recorded the aria twice, but even sang the Gaelic words before an audience of more than 5,000 at the Royal Albert Hall.

A third single was released in early 1982. This was "Ooh Shooby Doo Doo Lang", which told a light-hearted tale of a singer bemoaning the fact that she has been relegated to backing vocals; the lyrics go on to mention Paul McCartney and Stevie Wonder and both "Japanese Boy" and "Little Lady". The song missed the UK chart; however in Europe it gave her a third hit and was followed there by the release of another album track, "I Was Free".

=== Non–album singles (1983–1994) ===
Two further singles were released over the next two years, "Heart to Beat" in 1983 and "Rose, Rose, I Love You" in 1984, but neither of them found success. Aneka then dropped the Aneka title and continued with the folk-singing career she had begun before her fame. In 1991, she released the album Reflections on Scotland.

In 1994 she made a documentary entitled Aite Mo Ghaoil: Mary Sandeman and Islay. She has also appeared on STV music shows such as Thingummyjig and Hogmanay celebrations.

=== Work before retirement (1994–2006) ===
Aneka featured in a 2006 Channel 4 documentary titled 'Bring Back The One Hit Wonders'. Justin Lee Collins attempted to organise a one-off performance of as many one hit wonders as possible but despite getting in touch with Aneka, she declined to take part as she did not want to travel to London from her home in Scotland, and had no desire to perform the hit. She stated that "Japanese Boy" sold five million copies around the world.

She has since confirmed her retirement from music, and was last known to be working as a part-time tour guide for the Scottish city of Stirling.

== Artistry ==
A mezzo-soprano, she has appeared with the Scottish Fiddle Orchestra in concert and on record. In 1994 she made a documentary entitled Aite Mo Ghaoil: Mary Sandeman and Islay. She has also appeared on STV music shows such as Thingummyjig and Hogmanay celebrations.

== Personal life ==
Sandeman is divorced and has two sons with her ex-husband. In 1975 her brother, David, was killed in a flying accident.

== Discography ==
=== Studio albums ===
Title	Album details	Peak chart positions	
Title	Album details	FIN	SWE
Aneka	Released: 8 June 1981; Label: Hansa	12	19

=== Singles ===
Year	Title	Peak chart positions												Certifications	Album
Year	Title	UK	AUT	BEL	CAN	FIN	IRE	GER	NED	NOR	SWE	SWI	SA	Certifications	Album
1981	"Japanese Boy"	1	4	1	42	1	1	3	7	4	1	1	19	UK: Silver; CAN: Gold; GER: Gold	Aneka
1981	"Little Lady"	50	7	14	—	6	—	10	18	—	14	—	—		Aneka
1982	"Ooh Shooby Doo Doo Lang"	— (Note: This single did not enter the UK Singles Chart, but did reach number 109 on the Record Business Bubbling Under Singles 101–150 chart.)	8	—	—	—	—	18	41	—	—	—	—		Aneka
1983	"Heart to Beat"	—	—	—	—	—	—	—	—	—	—	—	—		Non-album singles
1984	"Rose, Rose, I Love You"	—	—	—	—	—	—	—	—	—	—	—	—		Non-album singles
