= What Do You Want to Make Those Eyes at Me For? =

1916 song, covered by Emile Ford in 1959

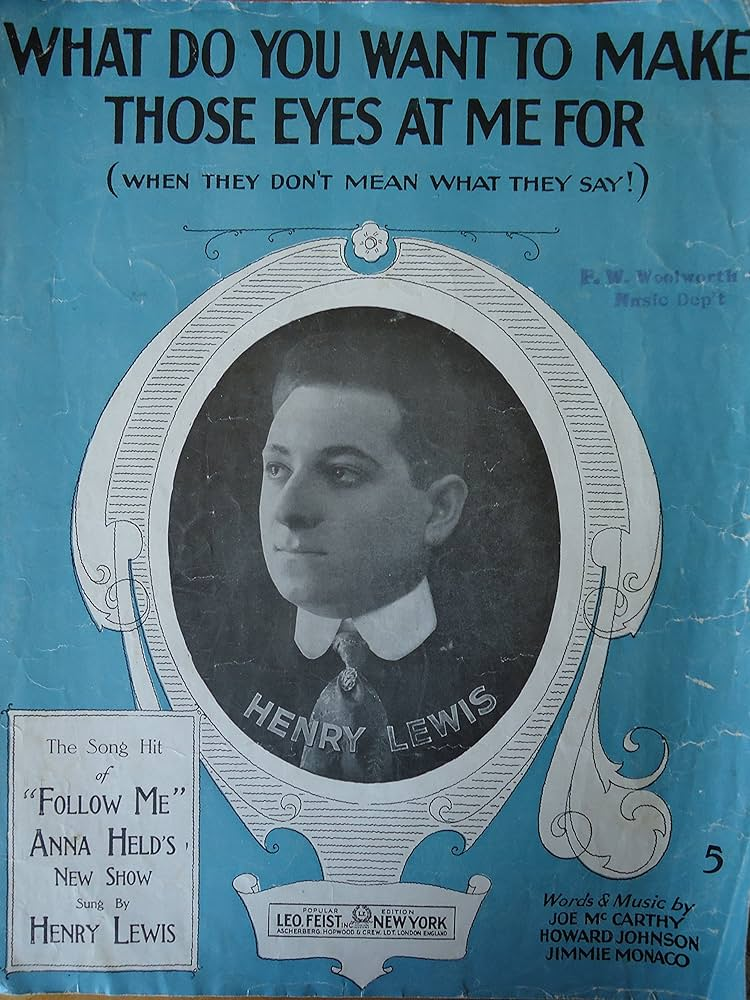
- Sheet music cover, 1916

Song
- Written: 1916
- Composer: James V. Monaco
- Lyricists: Joseph McCarthy; Howard Johnson

"What Do You Want to Make Those Eyes at Me For?" is a song written by Joseph McCarthy, Howard Johnson and James V. Monaco in 1916 for the Broadway production Follow Me, in which it was performed by Henry Lewis.

== Early recordings ==
Lewis' version was released as a single on Emerson Records in early 1917. Around the same time, a version by Sam Ash was released in February on Columbia Records, having been recorded on 11 December 1916. It was first a hit when released in March that year by Ada Jones and Billy Murray on Victor Records, peaking at number 3 on the US Billboard chart. It was sung by Betty Hutton in the 1945 film Incendiary Blonde. Her recording was then released on the A side of Capitol Records 211.

== Emile Ford and the Checkmates version ==
"What Do You Want to Make Those Eyes at Me For?"

Single by Emile Ford and the Checkmates
- A-side: "Don't Tell Me Your Troubles"
- Released: October 1959
- Recorded: October 1959
- Studio: Lansdowne Studios, London
- Genre: Doo-wop
- Length: 2:01
- Label: Pye
- Songwriters: Joseph McCarthy; Howard Johnson; James V. Monaco
- Producers: Emile Ford; Joe Meek

Emile Ford and the Checkmates singles chronology
"What Do You Want to Make Those Eyes at Me For?" (1959)	"On a Slow Boat to China" (1960)

The song became a UK hit in 1959 when a doo-wop version was recorded by Emile Ford and the Checkmates as the B-side of their single "Don't Tell Me Your Troubles". This B-side became more popular and it topped the charts for six weeks over the Christmas and New Year of 1959/60. It retained the number 1 position for the first three weeks of 1960. This earned Ford his first gold disc for sales of over a million, which was "an incredible feat for an unknown singer with his debut recording". The song was co-produced by Ford and Joe Meek.

=== Personnel ===
- Emile Ford – lead vocals, guitar
- George Sweetman – saxophone
- Dave Sweetman – bass
- Ken Street – guitar
- Pete Carter – guitar
- Les Hart – tenor saxophone
- Alan Hawkshaw – piano
- John Cuffley – drums

=== Charts ===
Chart (1959–1960)	Peak position
Australia (Kent Music Report)	1
Netherlands (Single Top 100)	3
Norway (VG-lista)	1
UK Singles (Official Charts)	1

== Shakin' Stevens version ==
"What Do You Want to Make Those Eyes at Me For"

Single by Shakin' Stevens

from the album Let's Boogie
- B-side: "(Yeah) You're Evil"
- Released: 16 November 1987
- Recorded: 1987
- Genre: Pop rock
- Length: 2:49
- Label: Epic
- Songwriters: Joseph McCarthy; Howard Johnson; James V. Monaco
- Producers: Carey Taylor; Shakin' Stevens

Shakin' Stevens singles chronology
"Come See About Me" (1987)	"What Do You Want to Make Those Eyes at Me For" (1987)	"Feel the Need in Me" (1988)

In 1987, Welsh singer Shakin' Stevens covered the song for his album Let's Boogie. It became his first UK Top 10 hit in two years, peaking at number 5 on the Singles Chart and became his last until the re-entry of "Merry Christmas Everyone" in 2018.

=== Track listings ===
7": Epic / SHAKY 5 (UK)

1. "What Do You Want to Make Those Eyes at Me For" – 2:49
2. "(Yeah) You're Evil" – 2:11

7": Epic / 651255 7 (Australia)

1. "What Do You Want to Make Those Eyes at Me For" – 2:49
2. "If You're Gonna Cry" – 3:43

EP: Epic / SHAKY G5 (UK, Limited Edition)

1. "What Do You Want to Make Those Eyes at Me For" – 2:49
2. "(Yeah) You're Evil" – 2:11
3. "Merry Christmas Everyone" – 3:39
4. "With My Heart" – 2:45

=== Charts ===
Chart (1987–1988)	Peak position
Belgium (Ultratop 50 Flanders)	25
Ireland (IRMA)	8
UK Singles (Official Charts)	5

== Other versions ==
- Swedish rock band Hep Stars incorporated the song into their repertoire, and a live version of it was included on their 1965 live album Hep Stars on Stage.
- Swedish singer Christer Sjögren released the song on his 2008 album Mitt sköna sextiotal.

== See also ==
- List of number-one singles from the 1950s (UK)
- List of UK singles chart number ones of the 1960s
- List of number-one singles in Australia during the 1960s
- List of number-one songs in Norway
