= Teardrops (Shakin' Stevens song) =

1984 single by Shakin' Stevens

Single by Shakin' Stevens

from the album Greatest Hits
- B-side: "You Shake Me Up"
- Released: 12 November 1984
- Recorded: 1984
- Genre: Rock and roll
- Length: 3:59
- Label: Epic
- Songwriter(s): Shakin' Stevens
- Producer(s): Shakin' Stevens; Richard Anthony Hewson; Christopher Neil

Shakin' Stevens singles chronology
"A Letter to You" (1984)	"Teardrops" (1984)	"Breaking Up My Heart" (1985)

"Teardrops" is a song by Welsh singer Shakin' Stevens, released in November 1984 as the second single from his Greatest Hits album. It peaked at number 5 on the UK Singles Chart. The song features The Shadows' Hank Marvin on lead guitar and was later included as a bonus track on the remastered version of Lipstick, Powder and Paint on The Epic Masters box set.

== Release ==
A limited edition double seven-inch single was released, titled the 'Shaky Party Pack'. The bonus single included two medley remixes of Stevens' previous UK hits. The first was a medley of "Cry Just a Little Bit", "You Drive Me Crazy", "A Rockin' Good Way", "Give Me Your Heart Tonight", "A Love Worth Waiting For" and "Green Door". The second was a medley of "I'll Be Satisfied", "A Letter to You", "I'll Be Satisfied" (Reprise), "Shirley", "Oh Julie", "It's Late", "Marie, Marie", "Hot Dog" and "This Ole House". For the twelve-inch single, these two medleys were combined to form the B-side, lasting almost nine minutes long.

== Track listings ==
7": Epic / A 4882 (UK)

1. "Teardrops" – 3:59
2. "You Shake Me Up" – 2:54

Double 7": Epic / DA 4882 (UK, titled 'Shaky Party Pack')

1. "Teardrops"
2. "You Shake Me Up"
3. "Megamixofhits" (Part 1)
4. "Megamixofhits" (Part 2)

12": Epic: / TA 4882 (UK)

1. "Teardrops" – 4:45
2. ""You Shake Me Up" – 2:54
3. "Megamixofhits" – 8:48

== Charts ==
Chart (1984–1985)	Peak position
Australia (Kent Music Report)	71
Austria (Ö3 Austria Top 40)	14
Belgium (Ultratop 50 Flanders)	25
Denmark (Hitlisten)	8
Germany (GfK)	25
Ireland (IRMA)	5
Netherlands (Single Top 100)	49
UK Singles (OCC)	5

=== Year-end charts ===
Chart (1984)	Position
UK Singles (Gallup)	72

== Certifications ==
Region	Certification	Certified units/sales
United Kingdom (BPI)	Silver	250,000^{^}
^{^} Shipments figures based on certification alone.
