= Breaking Up My Heart =

1985 single by Shakin' Stevens

Single by Shakin' Stevens

from the album Greatest Hits
- B-side: "I'll Give You My Heart"
- Released: 18 February 1985
- Recorded: 1984
- Genre: Pop rock; synth-pop
- Length: 3:57
- Label: Epic
- Songwriter(s): Bob Heatlie
- Producer(s): Peter Collins; Shakin' Stevens (executive)

Shakin' Stevens singles chronology
"Teardrops" (1984)	"Breaking Up My Heart" (1985)	"Lipstick, Powder and Paint" (1985)

"Breaking Up My Heart" is a song by Welsh singer Shakin' Stevens, released in February 1985 as the third and final single from his Greatest Hits album. It peaked at number 14 on the UK Singles Chart. The song was notable for its more contemporary, synthesiser-driven arrangement, departing from Stevens' trademark '50s rock-and-roll influenced sound. A limited pop-up gatefold sleeve version was also released, where Stevens pops up from the middle of the sleeve when opened.

== Track listings ==
7": Epic / A 6072 (UK)

1. "Breaking Up My Heart" – 3:57
2. "I'll Give You My Heart" – 2:54

12": Epic / TA 6072 (UK)

1. "Breaking Up My Heart" (Extended Remix) – 6:55
2. "I'll Give You My Heart" – 2:54

== Charts ==
Chart (1985)	Peak position
Austria (Ö3 Austria Top 40)	23
Belgium (Ultratop 50 Flanders)	32
Denmark (Hitlisten)	15
Germany (GfK)	31
Ireland (IRMA)	7
South Africa (Springbok Radio)	10
UK Singles (OCC)	14
