= A Letter to You =

1984 single by Shakin' Stevens

Single by Shakin' Stevens

from the album Greatest Hits
- B-side: "Come Back and Love Me"
- Released: 3 September 1984
- Genre: Rock and roll
- Length: 3:12
- Label: Epic
- Songwriter: Dennis Linde
- Producer: Peter Collins

Shakin' Stevens singles chronology
"A Love Worth Waiting For" (1984)	"A Letter to You" (1984)	"Teardrops" (1984)

"In a Letter to You"

Single by Eddy Raven

from the album Temporary Sanity
- B-side: "Risky Business"
- Released: March 1989
- Genre: Country
- Length: 3:15
- Label: Universal
- Songwriter: Dennis Linde
- Producer: Barry Beckett

Eddy Raven singles chronology
"'Til You Cry" (1988)	"In a Letter to You" (1989)	"Bayou Boys" (1989)

"A Letter to You" is a song written by Dennis Linde and originally recorded by Shakin' Stevens. His version of the song went to #10 on the UK Singles Chart.

Five years later, the song was covered by Eddy Raven under the title "In a Letter to You". His first release for Capitol Records, it was Raven's fifth number one on the country chart, staying at number one for one week and spending fourteen weeks in the Top 40.

== Chart performance ==
=== Shakin' Stevens ===
Chart (1984)	Peak position
Belgium (Ultratop 50 Flanders)	37
Denmark (Hitlisten)	8
Germany (GfK)	44
Netherlands (Single Top 100)	30
Switzerland (Schweizer Hitparade)	21
UK Singles (Official Charts)	10

=== Eddy Raven ===
Weekly charts

Chart (1989)	Peak position
Canada Country Singles (RPM)	1
US Hot Country Songs (Billboard)	1

Year-end charts

Chart (1989)	Position
Canada Country Tracks (RPM)	55
US Country Songs (Billboard)	18
