= Bob Heatlie =

Scottish musician (1946–2023)

- Born: Robert Raymond Heatlie; July 20, 1946; Craigmillar, Edinburgh, Scotland
- Died: April 8, 2023 (aged 76); Edinburgh, Scotland
- Occupation: Musician

Robert Raymond Heatlie (July 20, 1946 – April 8, 2023) was a Scottish songwriter and record producer who collaborated with many music acts, both bands and solo artists. He also produced multiple musical scores for television entertainment series.

== Biography ==
=== Early life ===
Born in Craigmillar, in Edinburgh, Scotland, he started learning the saxophone from his father when he was six years old. He later played drums in his father's band.

=== Hit songs ===
His most successful and prominent songs are "Japanese Boy" and "Merry Christmas Everyone", both substantial 1980s pop chart hits across Europe and beyond: the former being a 1981 novelty hit, recorded by Scottish singer Aneka and released by the German record label Hansa, and the latter being a 1985-released Christmas hit, recorded by Welsh artist Shakin' Stevens. Merry Christmas Everyone reached No. 1 on the UK Singles Chart, and has since become an annual mainstay of radio airplay around the December holidays.

Heatlie wrote the songs "Cry Just a Little Bit" (1983) and "Breaking Up My Heart" (1985) for Shakin' Stevens. Heatlie wrote another track for Stevens titled "Woman (What Have You Done To Me)", included on the 1988 album, A Whole Lotta Shaky. The song's remixed version of the same song was featured in Stevens' 2009 release, The Epic Masters. Bob Heatlie then co-produced and remixed nine songs on Stevens' albums. The last single Heatlie worked on with Shakin' Stevens was "Radio", which was released in 1992 and featured Roger Taylor from Queen.

=== Later work ===
In later years, Heatlie concentrated on creating musical compositions for children's television. His career began with the 1986 children's animation, The Trap Door. He composed the music for the documentary series Worlds Apart and the television special The Curious Case of Santa Claus.

=== Personal life and death ===
One of Heatlie's partners was Hungarian singer Éva Csepregi, lead vocalist of the disco band Neoton Família. Heatlie produced her solo albums from 1985 to 1992, which gained popularity in the Soviet Union and across Asia. In 1992, Csepregi and Heatlie had a son, Dávid.

Heatlie died at home in Edinburgh on April 8, 2023, at the age of 76, after battling an illness.

== Songwriting credits ==
=== Solo ===
- Aneka – "Japanese Boy" (single, 8 August 1981, UK No. 1)
- Cliff Richard – "Locked Inside Your Prison" (album track on Silver (Cliff Richard album), October 1983, UK No. 7)
- Shakin' Stevens – "Cry Just a Little Bit" (single, November 5, 1983, UK No. 3, US No. 67)
- Shakin' Stevens, "Breaking Up My Heart" (single, 2 March 1985, UK No. 14)
- Shakin' Stevens, "Merry Christmas Everyone" (single, 7 December 1985, UK No. 1)
- Ann Turner, "Too Hot to Handle" (runner-up in the UK's Song For Europe Eurovision Song Contest selection TV programme, 1987)
- Shakin' Stevens, "Woman (What Have You Done to Me)" (album track on "A Whole Lotta Shaky," 1988)

=== Gordon Campbell ===
- Local Hero: "Why Don't You" (B-side to the single "Daydream Believer")
- Anya – "Moscow Nights" (single, 1985)
- Shakin' Stevens, "Radio" (single, 10 October 1992, UK No. 37)

=== For TV ===
- Professor Bubble theme tune
- The Trap Door theme tune - vocals performed by Zygott
- Little Robots (2003–2005)
- Kipper (1997–2000)
- Bob the Builder (1997 pilot)
- Sheeep (2000–2001)
- Anthony Ant (1999)
- Percy the Park Keeper (1996–1999)
- First Report (used as the Hevrat HaHadashot theme tune for its 1996 Israeli general election special, and for its main evening news bulletin between 1997 and 2003, with elements remaining in later themes until 2017 (Note: First Report's backing track was reused for the 2003-2007 theme, and a musical motif was retained by the 2007-2017 theme, a rearranged version of the 2003-2007 one. While the 2017 theme is a further rearrangement of the 2007-2017 theme, it no longer contains any elements that can be traced back to First Report.)).
- BBC Revisewise theme (title "Happy Tech 59", published by APM Music)
- Composed with David Pringle
  - Fun House theme tune
  - Wheel of Fortune theme tune (title "Spin And Win", published by KPM)
