= Merry Christmas Everyone =

1985 single by Shakin' Stevens

Single by Shakin' Stevens
- B-side: "With My Heart", "Blue Christmas"
- Released: 25 November 1985
- Recorded: 1984
- Genre: Pop rock; Christmas
- Length: 3:39
- Label: Epic
- Songwriter: Bob Heatlie
- Producer: Dave Edmunds

Shakin' Stevens singles chronology
"Lipstick, Powder and Paint" (1985)	"Merry Christmas Everyone" (1985)	"Turning Away" (1986)

Music video
- "Merry Christmas Everyone" on YouTube

"Merry Christmas Everyone" is a festive song recorded by Welsh singer-songwriter Shakin' Stevens. Written by Bob Heatlie and produced by Dave Edmunds, it is the fourth and to date last number-one single for Shakin' Stevens on the UK singles chart.

It was released on 25 November 1985 and was the Christmas number one for that year. Ever since it has been included on many top-selling Christmas collections and received frequent airplay every Christmas. In 2007, the song re-entered the UK top 30 and reached number 22 on the Christmas chart. This is because downloads are now included in the UK singles chart; whereas in past years this would have been impossible unless there was a physical re-release of the song. From 2007 to 2017, the song charted in the UK at peak positions 22, 36, 47, 68, 42, 46, 54, 38, 26, 17, and 10. Originally only in the chart for eight weeks, it has since amassed over 70 weeks. In December 2018 it reached No. 9 in the UK chart, its highest position since 1985. In both December 2019 and December 2020, it reached No. 6.

== Background ==
"Merry Christmas Everyone" was recorded in 1984. Its original planned release was put back by a year to avoid clashing with the runaway success of Band Aid's charity single "Do They Know It's Christmas?".

== Music video ==
The video shows a young girl named Samantha travelling by plane to a place called Santaworld where she joins Stevens who met her on a bus going to the place. Stevens is then seen riding with a woman dressed as an elf in a sleigh pulled by a horse, and is taken to meet Santa Claus before going to a replica of Santa's workshop. Here, children are seen playing with toys before going out with Santa on the sleigh, and Stevens joins in a snowball fight with some other children and ends up hitting a snowman who starts to chase him. At the end of the video, Stevens is seen bidding farewell to Santa, the snowman and the children before going back on the sleigh with the woman. Filmed in Sweden, the children include Stevens' son and daughter, plus their friends, including Stevens' drummer's daughter, actor Sarah J Price (in her first role), and competition winner Jeremy Cartwright, who was holidaying in Wales prior to filming and can be seen sledging at speed down a hill.

== Track listing ==
=== UK 7-inch single ===
1. "Merry Christmas Everyone" (Bob Heatlie) – 3:39
2. "With My Heart" (Bruce Roberts / Darrell Edwards / Shakin' Stevens) – 2:45

=== UK 12-inch single ===
1. "Merry Christmas Everyone" (Extended Version) (Bob Heatlie) – 4:17
2. "Blue Christmas" (Billy Hayes / Jay W. Johnson) – 2:45
3. "With My Heart" (Bruce Roberts / Darrell Edwards / Shakin' Stevens) – 2:45

== Charts ==
=== Weekly charts ===
Weekly charts for "Merry Christmas Everyone"
Chart (1985–2026)	Peak position
Australia (ARIA)	27
Austria (Ö3 Austria Top 40)	3
Belgium (Ultratop 50 Flanders)	10
CIS Airplay (TopHit)	77
Croatia (Billboard)	13
Croatia International Airplay (Top lista)	4
Czech Republic Singles Digital (ČNS IFPI)	25
Denmark (Tracklisten)	6
Estonia Airplay (TopHit)	44
Germany (GfK)	3
Global 200 (Billboard)	25
Greece International (IFPI)	24
Hungary (Editors' Choice Top 40)	25
Hungary (Single Top 40)	8
Hungary (Stream Top 40)	17
Ireland (IRMA)	3
Latvia Airplay (LaIPA)	14
Lithuania (AGATA)	25
Luxembourg Streaming (Billboard)	18
Malta Airplay (Radiomonitor)	19
Netherlands (Single Top 100)	6
New Zealand (Recorded Music NZ)	26
Norway (VG-lista)	34
Poland Airplay (ZPAV)	9
Poland (Polish Streaming Top 100)	5
Portugal (AFP)	49
Romania Airplay (TopHit)	46
Slovakia Airplay (ČNS IFPI)	28
Slovakia Singles Digital (ČNS IFPI)	14
Slovenia (SloTop50)	37
Sweden (Sverigetopplistan)	39
Switzerland (Schweizer Hitparade)	9
UK Singles (The Official Charts Company)	1

=== Monthly charts ===
Monthly chart performance for "Merry Christmas Everyone"
Chart (2025)	Peak position
CIS Airplay (TopHit)	92
Lithuania Airplay (TopHit)	57
Romania Airplay (TopHit)	53

=== Year-end charts ===
2021 year-end chart for "Merry Christmas Everyone"
Chart (2021)	Position
UK Singles (OCC)	95

2023 year-end chart for "Merry Christmas Everyone"
Chart (2023)	Position
Germany (GfK)	76

2024 year-end chart for "Merry Christmas Everyone"
Chart (2024)	Position
Austria (Ö3 Austria Top 40)	53
Germany (GfK)	77

2025 year-end chart for "Merry Christmas Everyone"
Chart (2025)	Position
Germany (GfK)	72

== Certifications ==
Region	Certification	Certified units/sales
Denmark (IFPI Danmark)	4× Platinum	360,000^{‡}
Germany (BVMI)	3× Gold	900,000^{‡}
New Zealand (RMNZ)	Gold	15,000^{‡}
Portugal (AFP)	Gold	12,000^{‡}
United Kingdom (BPI)	5× Platinum	3,000,000^{‡}
Streaming
Greece (IFPI Greece)	Gold	1,000,000^{†}
^{‡} Sales+streaming figures based on certification alone.^{†} Streaming-only figures based on certification alone.

== "Echoes of Merry Christmas Everyone" (2015) ==
"Echoes of Merry Christmas Everyone"

Single by Shakin' Stevens
- Released: 4 December 2015
- Recorded: 2015
- Genre: Bluegrass
- Songwriter: Bob Heatlie

Shakin' Stevens singles chronology
"Trouble / This Ole House" (2005)	"Echoes of Merry Christmas Everyone" (2015)	"Last Man Alive" (2016)

In time for Christmas 2015, Shakin' Stevens released a new version of the song as a charity single in collaboration with The Salvation Army. It is a completely revamped version with folk and bluegrass influences and prominent use of banjo. The single was available as a download starting December 2015 with all proceeds going to The Salvation Army.

The 2015 single did not chart on the UK Top 100, although the original by Shakin' Stevens made it to number 26 on the UK Top 100 Chart published on Christmas week.

== The Celebs version ==
In 2020, during the COVID-19 pandemic, a supergroup known as the Celebs, which included Laura Tobin, Richard Arnold, Frank Bruno, The X Factor winner Sam Bailey and others, recorded a new rendition of "Merry Christmas Everyone" to raise money for both the Alzheimer's Society and Action for Children. It was released digitally on 11 December 2020, on independent record label Saga Entertainment. The music video debuted exclusively on Good Morning Britain the day before release.
