= A Love Worth Waiting For =

1984 single by Shakin' Stevens

Single by Shakin' Stevens

from the album The Bop Won't Stop
- B-side: "As Long As" (Live)
- Released: 12 March 1984
- Recorded: 1983
- Studio: Eden Studios, London
- Genre: Rock and roll
- Length: 3:20
- Label: Epic
- Songwriters: Gary Sulsh; Stuart Leathwood
- Producers: Richard Anthony Hewson; Shakin' Stevens

Shakin' Stevens singles chronology
"A Rockin' Good Way" (1983)	"A Love Worth Waiting For" (1984)	"Diddle I" (1984)

"A Love Worth Waiting For" is a song by Welsh singer Shakin' Stevens, released in March 1984 as the fourth single from his album The Bop Won't Stop. It peaked at number 2 on the UK Singles Chart for two weeks and was certified silver in the UK by the BPI.

== Reception ==
Reviewing the song for Record Mirror, Culture Club's Roy Hay wrote that "the production sounds quite good, and the pizzicato strings are fun, but after the last one with Bonnie and the strings on that, what is Shaky doing, we ask ourselves? I'm not very impressed, I wouldn't have though this was Top 10 – it's too soft for him". Peter Martin for Smash Hits wrote that the song "sounds like it's about 30 years old. A flimsy song all about everlasting love with plucked strings and warbly vocals a-go-go. A real sickener.

== Track listings ==
7": Epic / A 4291 (UK)

1. "A Love Worth Waiting For" – 3:20
2. "As Long As" (Live) – 3:08

7": Epic / 34-04558 (US)

1. "A Love Worth Waiting For" – 3:21
2. "Why Do You Treat Me This Way?" – 2:27

7": Epic / EN5640 (South Africa)

1. "A Love Worth Waiting For" – 3:20
2. "Cry Just a Little Bit" – 3:11

12": Epic / TA 4291 (UK)

1. "A Love Worth Waiting For" – 3:20
2. "Don't Tell Me We're Through" (Live) – 5:46
3. "As Long As" (Live) – 3:08

== Charts ==
Chart (1984)	Peak position
Australia (Kent Music Report)	44
Austria (Ö3 Austria Top 40)	13
Belgium (Ultratop 50 Flanders)	24
Germany (GfK)	26
Ireland (IRMA)	2
Israel (IBA)	6
Netherlands (Dutch Top 40)	38
Netherlands (Single Top 100)	24
Paraguay (UPI)	5
UK Singles (Official Charts)	2

== Certifications ==
Region	Certification	Certified units/sales
United Kingdom (BPI)	Silver	250,000^{^}
^{^} Shipments figures based on certification alone.
