= Shakin' Stevens =

Welsh rock and roll singer and songwriter (born 1948)

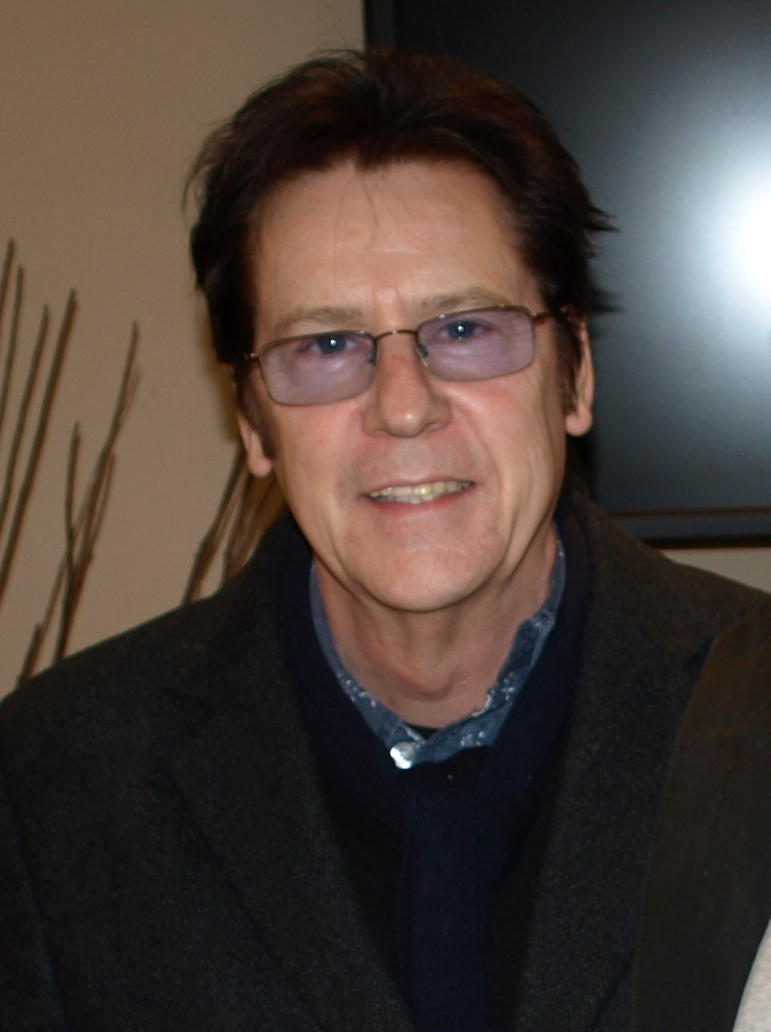
- Stevens in 2013

Background information
- Born: Michael Barratt; 4 March 1948 (age 78); Cardiff, Wales
- Genres: Rockabilly; rock and roll
- Years active: 1968–present
- Labels: Parlophone; CBS International (division of Columbia); Epic; Polydor
- Formerly of: Shakin' Stevens and the Sunsets
- Website: shakinstevens.com

Michael Barratt (born 4 March 1948), known professionally as Shakin' Stevens, is a Welsh singer and songwriter. He was the UK's biggest-selling singles artist of the 1980s.

His recording and performing career began in the late 1960s, although it was not until 1980 that his commercial success began. His most successful songs were nostalgia hits, evoking the sound of 1950s rock and roll and pop.

In the UK alone, Stevens has charted 28 Top-40 hit singles including four chart-topping hits "This Ole House", "Green Door", "Oh Julie", and "Merry Christmas Everyone". Aside from "Merry Christmas Everyone" remaining popular during the Christmas season, his last Top 40 single was "Trouble" in 2005.

== Early life ==
Michael Barratt, who would later adopt the stage name Shakin' Stevens, was the youngest of 13 children born in Cardiff to Jack and May Barratt. His father was a First World War veteran who by 1948 was working in the building trade, having previously worked as a coal miner. The oldest of his siblings was born in the mid-1920s, and by the time of his birth some of his siblings had already left the family home to marry and start families of their own. Jack Barratt died in 1972 at the age of 75. May Barratt died in 1984 at the age of 79.

He grew up in Ely, Cardiff, and as a teenager in the mid-1960s he formed his first amateur rock 'n' roll band with school friends and became its vocalist and frontman. Originally named the Olympics, then the Cossacks, the short-lived band was finally renamed as the Denims and performed gigs in the local Cardiff and South Wales area. In the late 1960s, Stevens was associated with the Young Communist League (YCL), the youth wing of the Communist Party of Great Britain through playing at YCL events. At the time, the YCL was associated with several leading music industry figures, including Pete Townshend. However, Stevens has stated this was because the individual in charge of booking the band's gigs was also a member of the organisation.

In the late 1960s, his official occupation was a milkman, and he lived in a flat which formed part of an office block in inner-city Cardiff. The office block was demolished several years later. In 1995, Stevens bought Saham Toney Windmill, Norfolk, which he sold in 2015.

== Career ==
=== The Sunsets ===
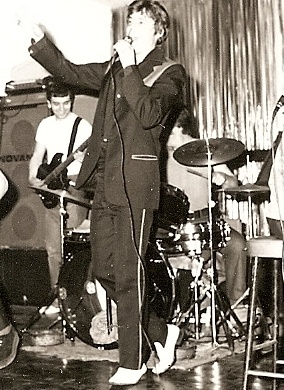
Stevens in 1976

While working as an upholsterer and milkman, Barratt performed at weekends in clubs and pubs. Having previously followed them as a fan and then as an occasional guest vocalist, Barratt joined the existing Penarth-based the Backbeats – originally formed in 1958 – as lead singer. He was spotted by South Wales impresario Paul "Legs" Barrett, who proposed repackaging the band as a 1950s-influenced rock 'n' roll outfit under a new name. Michael Barratt agreed to choose a stage name, and so borrowing from old school friend Steven Vanderwalker, he chose Shakin' Stevens.

Fronting the newly named Shakin' Stevens and the Sunsets, an early break for the band presented itself when they were given a support slot for the Rolling Stones in December 1969. Despite landing a recording contract with Parlophone Records the following year and releasing a Dave Edmunds-produced album, the optimistically and prematurely titled A Legend, the group found success hard to come by, at least in their native Great Britain, though they had several hit singles in other countries and released three albums on the Dutch Pink Elephant label. The band toured Germany, Belgium, France and the Netherlands in-between UK dates.

Because they only achieved minor sales in Great Britain, many of the Sunsets' records with Stevens have become collector's items in the years following his commercial breakthrough; for example a copy of their single "Honey Don't" released in Sweden on CBS Records in 1973 sold for over £340 in 2013. The Sunsets continue to perform, and still tour annually in the UK, Europe and Australia, fronted in recent years by Stevens' nephew, Levi Barratt.

=== Elvis! and a hit record ===
In 1977, after seven years of constant touring and recording, "Shaky", as he was also being called by this time, had been spotted during a London Sunsets gig by Jack Good, who personally invited him to attend a London audition for his planned new West End musical Elvis! Three actors were to portray Elvis's life during the course of the show and Stevens landed one of the lead roles, playing Elvis in his prime, in his army and film star years, with young actor Tim Whitnall covering the earlier formative years and veteran 1960s singer P.J. Proby taking over the part for Elvis's Las Vegas years.

The rest of the Sunsets waited in South Wales, doing occasional performances with drummer Robert "Rockin' Louis" Llewellyn taking the frontman duties, but fully expecting Stevens to return to the band and recommence touring after the show's planned six-month run. However, the expectations were overtaken by subsequent events. The media-wise Jack Good made sure that both the audition process and the early months of the show were widely and regularly covered by the British daily press and TV shows.

During the Elvis! show's successful and then twice-extended two-year run, Stevens made regular TV appearances, firstly on Good's revived British ITV show Oh Boy! and later on his follow-up 30-week-long series Let's Rock that was syndicated in 32 countries, including the United States. This led to his first major chart success with a reworking of the Buck Owens song "Hot Dog", which Owens would re-record using the arrangement created by pedal steel guitar player B. J. Cole.

=== 1980s: "This Ole House", Shaky and more chart success ===
In late 1979, Stevens signed what was to be his most successful management deal with Freya Miller, who immediately advised Stevens to sever his association with the Sunsets and continue developing a more lucrative solo career. Under Miller's hand, in 1981, following chart success in the UK with "Hot Dog" (number. 25) and "Marie Marie" (number 19) from his Stuart Colman produced debut albums Take One! and Marie Marie, Stevens scored his first UK number one with NRBQ's arrangement of "This Ole House". He would follow up with 10 more songs reaching the top five, including three number one hits with "Green Door", "Oh Julie" and "Merry Christmas Everyone", while "You Drive Me Crazy" and "A Love Worth Waiting For" reached number two in 1981 and 1984 respectively. His 1984 hit "Teardrops", which reached number five in the UK, featured Hank Marvin on guitar, and since then, Stevens has often featured famous musicians such as Albert Lee, Roger Taylor and Bonnie Tyler on his recordings.

Chart successes also included his album Shaky reaching number one on the UK Albums Chart and Give Me Your Heart Tonight, which reached number three. Shaky featured the hits "Green Door" (number one), "You Drive Me Crazy" (number two) and "It's Raining" (number 10), and the latter "Oh Julie" (number one), "Shirley" (number six), "I'll Be Satisfied" (number 10) and the title track (number 11). Both albums were produced by Colman.

It was followed by The Bop Won't Stop (1983, number 21), which featured the hits "A Rockin' Good Way" (number five 5, with Bonnie Tyler), "I Cry Just A Little Bit" (number three), "It's Late" (number 11) and "A Love Worth Waiting For" (number two).

In November 1984, Stevens released his first Greatest Hits album, featuring three new singles: "A Letter To You" (number 10), "Teardrops" (number five) and "Breaking Up My Heart" (number 14). The album climbed to number eight in the UK Albums Chart.

In the mid-1980s, Stevens re-united with former producer Dave Edmunds to record an album Lipstick, Powder and Paint, and the Christmas smash "Merry Christmas Everyone", which was a number one hit in 1985. Its original planned release was put back by a year to avoid clashing with the runaway success of Band Aid's charity single "Do They Know It's Christmas?", to which he did not contribute, having been out of the country touring at the time of recording.

In a Record Collector magazine feature, writer Kris Griffiths wrote: "This was Shaky at the very zenith of his powers and, perhaps, the breaking-point of marketing overload from which there is only decline. Such concentrated commercial success and ubiquity came with a price."

Despite Stevens's chart domination over the previous few years, he was not invited to perform at Live Aid on 13 July 1985. The hits continued but chart placings declined throughout the later 1980s and early 1990s. However, Stevens was one of the celebrities to appear in an advertising campaign for Heineken in the late 1980s. The slogan "refreshes the parts other beers cannot reach" was 'confirmed' in the advert, for he ceased to shake after consuming the product.

1987's Let's Boogie album featured top five hit "What Do You Want To Make Those Eyes at Me For" and the singles "Come See About Me" and "Because I Love You". It was followed by the album A Whole Lotta Shaky (1988, number 42), which featured a top-25 hit, "True Love".

Shaky wrapped up the 1980s with a top-30 single, "Love Attack".

=== 1990s: Christmas album, a break from recording ===
Stevens kicked off the 1990s with the singles "I Might" (number 28), "Yes I Do" and "Pink Champagne" from his album There Are Two Kinds of Music... Rock 'n' Roll. The album was largely produced by Pete Hammond.

After the release of 1991's Merry Christmas Everyone album and the single "Radio" (number 37) in 1992 (produced by Rod Argent and featuring Roger Taylor from Queen on drums), Stevens took a lengthy break from recording and was stung by a court ruling relating to unpaid royalties from the Legend album, which had been re-released to some commercial success, requiring a substantial payout to former band members of the Sunsets. In 1999, Stevens returned to performing live and undertook tours all that year and the following year.

=== 2000s: The Collection, Now Listen and Glastonbury ===
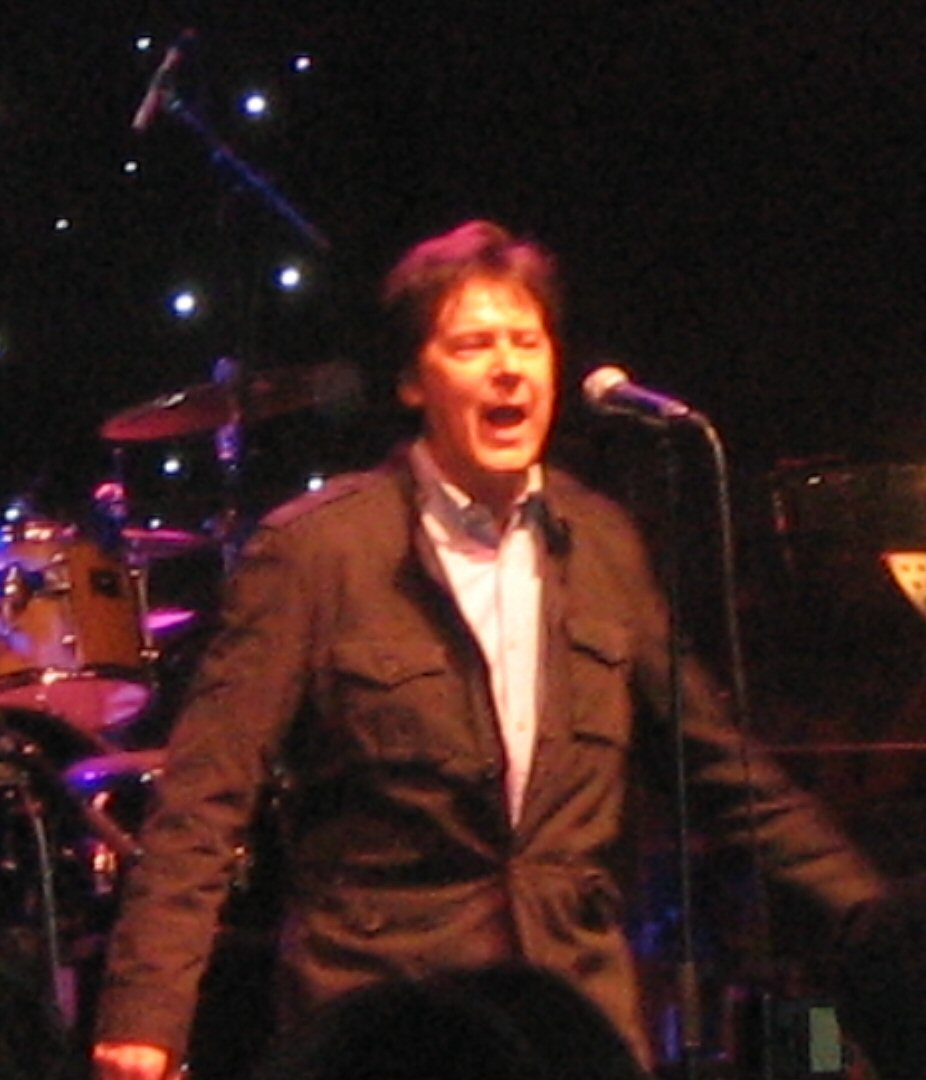
Stevens performing live

In 2004, he had a further platinum CD-DVD album in Denmark and a gold album in South Africa.

In 2005, Stevens returned to the charts in the United Kingdom with his greatest hits album The Collection, which reached the top 5. That year, he also appeared in the video to Tony Christie and Peter Kay's number one hit single "Is This the Way to Amarillo", alongside Ronnie Corbett, Jim Bowen and Michael Parkinson. Stevens was the winner on the reality television show Hit Me Baby One More Time. This was followed by a re-release of his cover, and his own biggest hit sung in the show, "Trouble" (covering Pink's version)/"This Ole House", which reached number 20 on the UK Singles Chart, his 33rd Top 40 hit in the United Kingdom.

It would feature on his 2006 pop-rock album Now Listen – Stevens' first new studio album since 1991 – alongside versions of "Got My Mind Set on You", Elvis Costello's "Pump It Up" and several new Stevens originals. Now Listen became a top ten success in Denmark.

Shakin' Stevens performed at 2008's Glastonbury Festival as the opening act on the Pyramid stage.

Chris Evans featured a special 'Shaky Week' on his Radio 2 show in 2008 to celebrate Stevens's 60th birthday and Stevens embarked on a string of major concerts in the UK and Europe.

=== 2010s: Echoes of Our Times and recording of live album ===
In 2010, Stevens was rushed to hospital after collapsing at his home in Windsor, reportedly from exhaustion brought on by the stress of working on a new album. It was later revealed that Stevens had suffered a heart attack, which caused him to be hospitalised for two months.

Stevens fully recovered and in 2011 embarked on his 30th Anniversary Tour. In 2013, Stevens participated in the family history programme Coming Home and discovered information about the effects of the First World War on his family.

Stevens appeared live on Radio X on 17 December 2015 on The Chris Moyles Show to promote his new Christmas Single "Echoes of a Merry Christmas" with proceeds going to The Salvation Army. The original version of the song re-entered the chart in the Top 40.

In 2016, Stevens released his 12th studio album, Echoes of Our Times, and in 2017 proceeded on a tour of the UK. The album was preceded by the single "Last Man Alive". The album was followed by single releases of "Down into Muddy Water" and "Down in the Hole". The album entered the UK Albums Chart at number 22.

He performed a concert in Sri Lanka in 2018.

In 2019, he recorded a live album which featuring songs from all over his career. Including hits like "This Ole House", "You Drive Me Crazy" and "Cry Just A Little Bit" and songs from his Now Listen and Echoes of Our Times albums. The album was released as part of the upcoming Fire in the Blood boxset.

=== 2020s: Fire in the Blood, Singled Out and Re-Set ===
A 19x CD anthology Fire in the Blood was released in 2020 accompanied by a 54-track 3x CD /26-track 2x LP collection Singled Out. The career-spanning collection was described by Stevens as "the biggest project of my career".

Singled Out entered the UK Albums Chart at number 10. The album was preceded by the single "Wild at Heart".

In 2023, Stevens released the follow-up to Echoes of Our Times, titled Re-Set. The album was preceded by two singles, "It All Comes Around" and the BBC Radio playlisted "All You Need Is Greed", which came with a video. The album entered the UK Albums Chart at number 24.

== Personal life ==
Stevens married Carole Dunn in October 1967, and they divorced in 2009 after 42 years of marriage. They had three children together: two sons and a daughter. After their divorce, Stevens later began a relationship with his manager Sue Davies, and he credits her with saving his life when he suffered a cardiac arrest in July 2010. His grandson is actor Billy Barratt.

Stevens lives in Marlow, Buckinghamshire. He is a lifelong supporter of Welsh football team Cardiff City.

In 2002, Stevens was charged with driving while over the alcohol limit and banned from driving for two years. He was also fined £400.

== Discography ==
=== With the Sunsets ===
- A Legend (1970)
- I'm No J.D. (1971)
- Rockin' and Shakin (1972)
- Shakin' Stevens & Sunsets (1973)
- Manhattan Melodrama (1975)
- Come on Memphis! (1977)

=== Solo ===
- Shakin' Stevens (1978)
- Take One! (1980)
- Marie, Marie (1980)
- This Ole House (1981)
- Shaky (1981)
- Give Me Your Heart Tonight (1982)
- The Bop Won't Stop (1983)
- Lipstick Powder and Paint (1985)
- Let's Boogie (1987)
- A Whole Lotta Shaky (1988)
- There Are Two Kinds of Music... Rock 'n' Roll (1990)
- Merry Christmas Everyone (1991)
- Now Listen (2007)
- Echoes of Our Times (2016)
- Re-Set (2023)

== Industry awards ==
Variety Club of Great Britain Awards

Year	Nominee / work	Award	Result
1983	Himself	Best Recording Artist	Won

TVTimes Awards

Year	Nominee / work	Award	Result
1982	Himself	Favourite Singer Award	Won

Brit Awards

Year	Nominee / work	Award	Result
1982	Himself	Brit Award for British Male Solo Artist	Nominated
1983	Himself	British Male Solo Artist	Nominated

Daily Mirror British Rock and Pop Awards

Year	Nominee / work	Award	Result
1981	Himself	Best Male Singer	Won

The Ivors Academy Formerly British Academy of Songwriters, Composers and Authors.

Year	Work	Category	Result
2000	Himself	Gold Badge Award of Merit	Won
