= American Music (album) =

- 1997 CD issue artwork

Studio album by the Blasters
- Released: 1980
- Studio: Rollin' Rock
- Genre: Rockabilly
- Label: Rollin' Rock
- Producer: Ronny Weiser

The Blasters chronology
American Music (1980)	The Blasters (1981)

Professional ratings
Review scores
Source	Rating
AllMusic	4.5/5 stars
Christgau's Record Guide	B+

American Music is the debut album by American rock band the Blasters, released in 1980.

The song "Marie Marie" became a breakthrough hit for Shakin' Stevens in 1980 (from This Ole House). Matchbox recorded the song for their 1980 album Midnite Dynamos. In 1997, the album was released on CD by Hightone Records.

"American Music" became title track of the early 1980s music television series New Wave Theatre.

The tracks "Marie Marie," "American Music," and "Never No Mo' Blues" were rerecorded for the Blasters' second album.

== Track listing ==
All songs composed by Dave Alvin, except where noted.

Side 1

1. "American Music" – 2:08
2. "Real Rock Drive" (Bill Haley) – 2:03
3. "Barefoot Rock" (Joseph Scott, Bud Harper) – 2:19
4. "I Don't Want To" – 1:56
5. "Marie Marie" – 2:02
6. "I Wish You Would" (Billy Boy Arnold) - 2:41
7. "She Ain't Got the Beat" (Dave Alvin, Phil Alvin) - 1:30

Side 2

1. "Flat Top Joint" - 2:27
2. "Crazy Baby" (Ron Volz, Ron Wemsman) - 2:26
3. "Never No Mo' Blues" (Elsie McWilliams, Jimmie Rodgers) - 2:46
4. "Buzz Buzz Buzz" (Robert Byrd, John Gray) - 2:06
5. "She's Gone Away" (Phil Alvin) - 2:25
6. "Barn Burning" - 3:36

CD bonus tracks, 1997

1. "21 Days in Jail" (Willie Dixon, L.P. Weaver) - 2:12
2. "It's Love Baby (24 Hours a Day)" (Ted Jarrett) - 3:10
3. "I Fell in Love" (Unknown) - 1:57
4. "So Glad" (Howlin' Wolf) - 2:19
5. "Ashamed of Myself" (Rose Marie McCoy, Charlie Singleton) - 2:24
6. "Lone Wolf" (R. Harris) - 3:19

== Personnel ==
- Phil Alvin – vocals, guitar, harmonica
- Dave Alvin – lead guitar
- John Bazz – bass
- Bill Bateman – drums
