= County Fair 2000 =

Studio album by Phil Alvin
- Released: 1994
- Label: HighTone
- Producer: Phil Alvin

Phil Alvin chronology
Un "Sung Stories" (1986)	County Fair 2000 (1994)	Common Ground: Dave & Phil Alvin Play and Sing the Songs of Big Bill Broonzy (2014)

County Fair 2000 is the second solo album by the American musician Phil Alvin, released in 1994. It arrived eight years after his solo debut, Un "Sung Stories", and followed years Alvin devoted to mathematics work. Alvin supported the album by touring with a Dave Alvin-less version of the Blasters. Alvin called the album "American minstrel music".

== Production ==
Alvin used the concept of a small-town midcentury county fair to tie together the album; he was primarily influenced by music from the 1920s to 1940s. Members of his jazz side project, the Faultline Syncopators, contributed to the songs. Cesar Rosas played guitar on the album. Billy Boy Arnold contributed on harmonica, the Dirty Dozen Brass Band on brass instruments. Fayard Nicholas tapped out the rhythm to one of the songs. "Ankh" is a cover of the Sun Ra song.

== Critical reception ==
Professional ratings
Review scores
Source	Rating
AllMusic	4/5 stars
Robert Christgau	(neither)
MusicHound Rock: The Essential Album Guide	3/5 stars

Trouser Press wrote that "it's a marvel to hear such musty chapters from music's history books brought to robust modern life in the hands of such a well-versed scholar." The Guardian concluded: "Brilliant in patches; it's a pity Alvin's voice doesn't match his guitar work." NPR stated that "there's room in his melting pot for ragtime, doo-wop, country music, the blues, and lots more." The St. Petersburg Times determined that, "while there is an understated attempt to preserve the musical forms, these fun-loving performances extend beyond the usual archivist or traditionalist boundaries." The Los Angeles Times noted that, "known for his high-voltage, larger-than-life delivery, Alvin shows a different dimension by playing it low-key throughout this album."

AllMusic wrote that "County Fair 2000 leaves no doubt that Phil Alvin is a premier musicologist, preserving and staying true to what he loves." The Spin Alternative Record Guide labeled Alvin the "West-Coast Buster Poindexter."

== Track listing ==
No.	Title	Length
1.	"County Fair"
2.	"Wreck Your V-8 Ford"
3.	"The Blue Line"
4.	"That Thing"
5.	"Turnin' Blues into Gold"
6.	"Starlight"
7.	"Keep in Touch"
8.	"What's the Reason I'm Not Pleasin' You"
9.	"She Loves So Good"
10.	"Callin' Corrine"
11.	"The Terror"
12.	"Oh, Doctor"
13.	"Mr. Satellite Man"
14.	"Low Down Rhythm"
15.	"Danny Boy's Mourning Sunset: The Old Rugged Cross / Ankh / Didn't He Ramble"
