= Gibson L-5 =

Guitar

1928 or 1930 Gibson Master Model L-5 Guitar

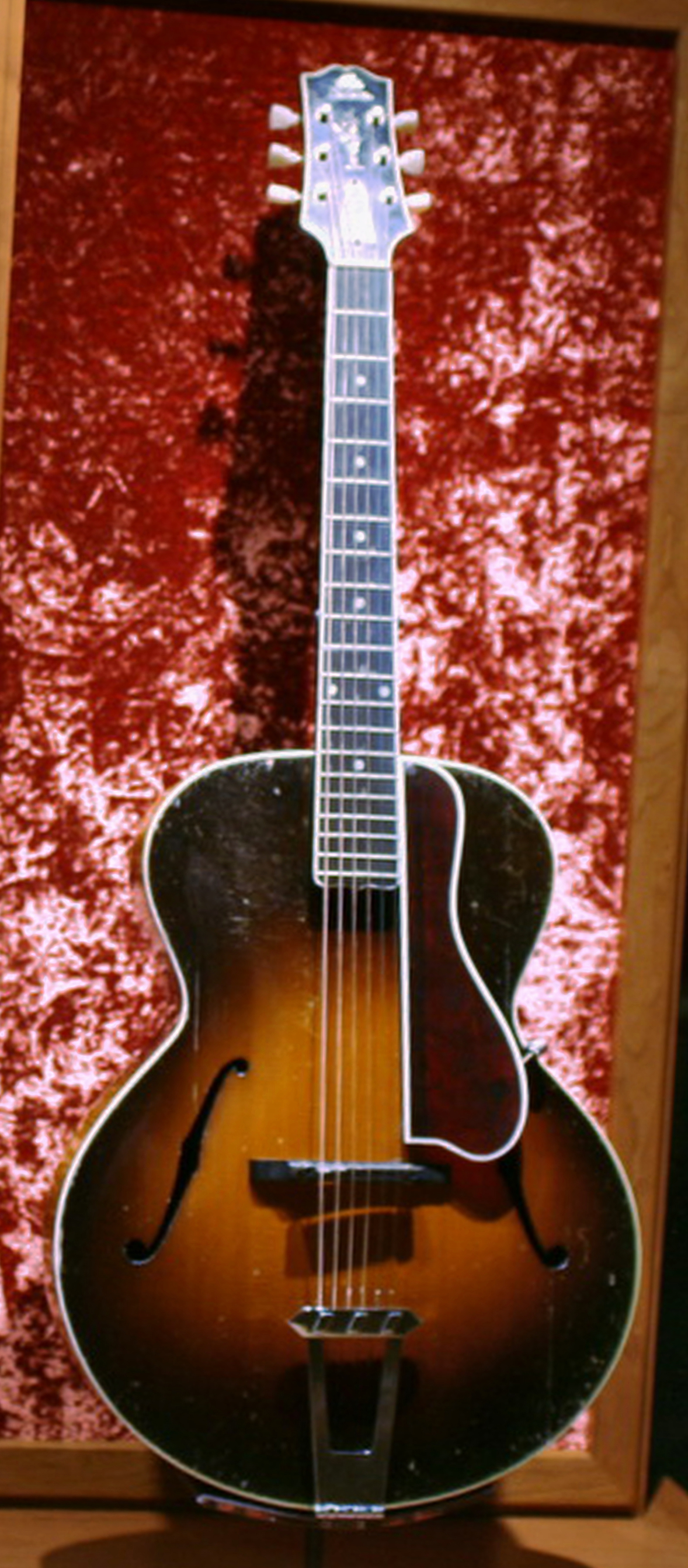
L-5 acoustic guitar, lower bout width: 16" (played by Maybelle Carter). Called "the most important single guitar in the entire history of country music", by George Gruhn.

There is controversy about its date. Commonly said to be a 1928 instrument, but researcher Joe Spann concluded that it couldn't have left the factory earlier than April 1929 and was shipped January, 1930.

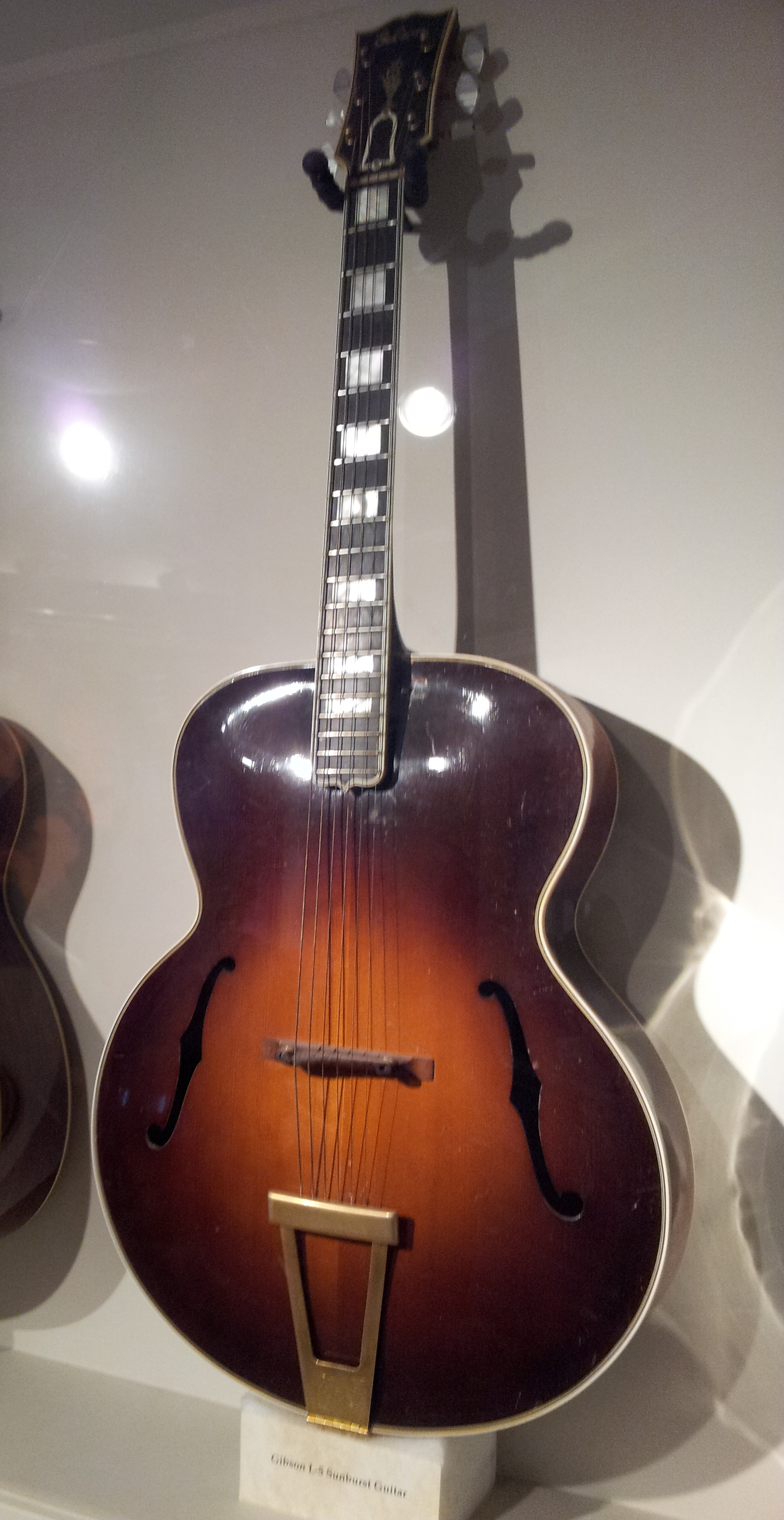
L-5 Advanced acoustic. (after 1934)
lower bout width: 17"

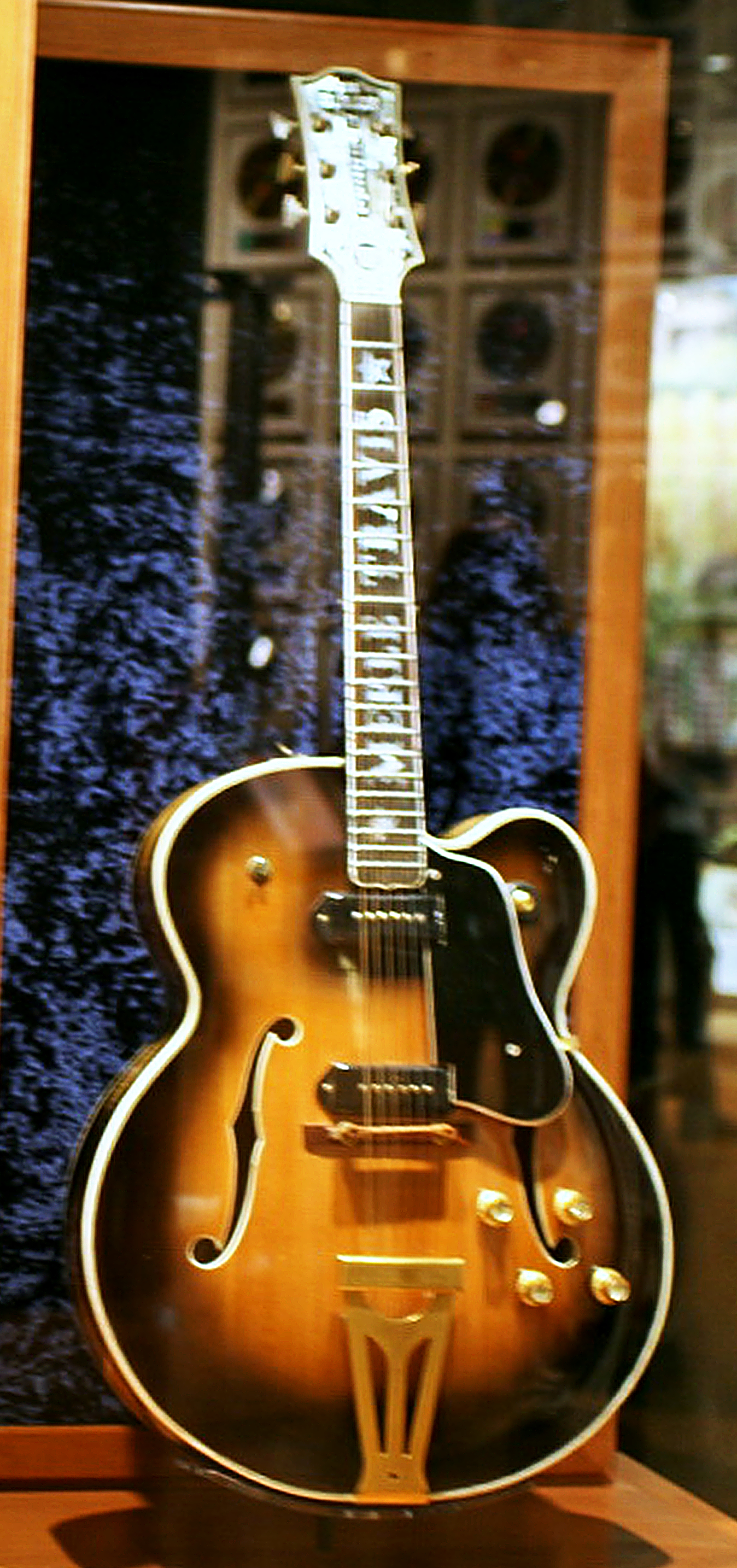
c.f. Super 400 introduced in 1934 has a wider body, lower bout width: 18"

Known prototypes between both models
1. Intermediate form of these models is known:
1935 L-5 Special with a Special 400-style/18" body
2. One of the earliest Super 400 (serial 91809) remains confusion of model name notation: "Deluxe" and "L-5" on the label, "Super L-5" on the truss rod cover, and "Super 400" on the neck heel plate.

The Gibson L-5 is a hollow body guitar first produced in 1923 by the Gibson Guitar Corporation, then of Kalamazoo, Michigan. One of the first guitars to feature F-holes, the L-5 was designed under the direction of acoustical engineer and designer Lloyd Loar, and has been in production ever since. It was considered Gibson's premier guitar until the Super 400 came in 1934. It was originally offered as an acoustic instrument; semi-acoustic models became available in the 1950s.

== Design and construction ==
The carving, bracing and tap-tuning processes involved in building the L-5 are similar to those used for a cello, and they share general aspects of construction. Both the cello and the L-5 amplify and project the acoustic vibration of strings through carved and tuned woods, using f-holes as the projection points. From 1922 to 1934 the L-5 was produced with a 16" lower bout width. In 1934 that width was increased to 17", which has remained the standard size. Also released in 1934 was a larger 18" archtop guitar named "L5 Super", later renamed Gibson Super 400. These two highly ornate acoustic guitars are Gibson's top-of-the-line carved archtop instruments. Since the 1930s Gibson has designed several other 17" archtops, including some more affordable, less ornate models.

=== The prewar years (1922–1940) ===
From its introduction in 1922–23 until the 1940s, the L-5 came in different configurations (all strictly acoustic):

- Type one 16" - As it first appeared when originally introduced in Gibson's price list (April 1923), the L-5 sported a 16" body with a Cremona brown finish, birch or maple sides, a single-bound, 20-fret fingerboard with a pointed end, dot inlays, a slanted "The Gibson" script logo on the headstock, and silver-finish hardware. Most of these type-one L-5s also had a built-in Virzi Tone Producer; this was (essentially) an extra soundboard with an oval shape suspended within the body of the instrument. The primary outward distinguishing characteristic of these early Loar-era Gibsons is the unbound pickguard.
- Type two 16" - Between 1925 and 1929, the L-5 featured a 16" body, maple back and sides, a triple-bound fingerboard, and no Virzi Tone Producer. Towards the end of this period, the headstock logo could either be slanted or horizontal. The hardware was gold-finished and the pickguard bound.
- Type three 16" - Between 1929 and 1935, the last iteration of the 16" L-5 had block abalone inlays on the fingerboard (which became a signature feature of the model), and the headstock logo gradually transitioned to a horizontal "Gibson" script without the article "The". Several specimens of this period also do away with the point at the end of the fingerboard, which is squared off instead.
- The 17" L-5 Advanced - Starting in 1935, the L-5 was produced with a 17" body. In the first two years, the tailpiece was a slightly wider version of the previous iteration, adorned with the lettering "L 5". By 1937, the now-iconic art deco gold-finished tailpiece with the silver central element had become the norm. Starting in 1936 the F holes were bound. The 17" L-5 was also the first L-5 model to feature a natural, blonde finish and a Venetian cutaway as options. This model, more or less unvaried, also appears in the early postwar years (roughly to 1947).

=== The postwar years ===
When regular production resumed at Gibson after the war, the L-5 appeared more or less identical to the 17" acoustic instrument produced at the end of the previous decade. Other than switching the logo on the headstock from flowing script to a "block" style, the most significant change in the years just after the war was the introduction of an electric L-5. In 1951, the 17" L-5 was outfitted with a pair of P-90 pickups to keep up with the musical requirements of the time. The designation of this version of the instrument was L-5 CES—standing for Cutaway Electric Spanish. This instrument could be had in the standard sunburst finish or with the blonde, natural finish. However, the all-acoustic version of the L-5 was not replaced by this new introduction, and remained available as a parallel option. Starting in 1958, the P-90 pickups were replaced by humbuckers.

=== The late 1950s to today ===
Today the standard model of the L-5 is the L-5 CES, the electric version designed to minimize the feedback that well-carved archtops are prone to when amplified.

Gibson periodically issues variations of the L-5 built in limited editions of varying size. One example is the thin-bodied "L-5 CT" (cutaway thin), which has the same overall specifications, with the exception of the body thickness. The CT model was first constructed for George Gobel, who wanted a less bulky guitar.

Another variation of the L-5 is the Wes Montgomery model, named for the popular 1950s and 1960s jazz guitarist. The Wes Montgomery model has a single "Classic 57" pickup in the neck position, and a parallel bracing supporting the top. Parallel bracing is the standard and more popular bracing is the slightly brighter sounding "parallel bracing", which is considered to project the sound farther than an X-braced archtop.

The 1955 Gibson Byrdland model is yet another L-5 variation, designed by Billy Byrd and Hank Garland. The Byrdland guitar has a thin L-5-style body and originally came with a narrower neck that featured a relatively short 23 1/2-inch scale length to aid in playing difficult chords.

Several different L-5 hollow-body models have appeared over the years, including the L-5 Signature and the L-5 Studio. The ES-5 was the first three pickup factory guitar model built. The ES-5 was inspired by the L-5, introduced in 1949, later modified as the Gibson ES-5 Switchmaster. Unlike the L-5 which had a solid carved spruce top and solid maple sides and back, the ES-5 body was constructed of pressed laminated wood to prevent feedback, Gibson also felt that the best tonewoods were not necessary in an electric model and pressed laminated wood would produce a more affordable to manufacture model and thus could land in many more players hands than the carved instruments.

The L-5 CES was a direct electric version of the L-5, introduced in 1951. These originally used P-90 pickups, but used humbucker pickups from 1958 on. From 1961 through 1969, most production L-5CES guitars featured a "florentine" (sharp) cutaway, replacing the "venetian" (rounded) cutaway design.

== Notable performers ==
The L-5 has for multiple generations been seen in the hands of many performers. Many RCA recordings from the fifties feature the guitar prominently, including Elvis Presley's records, which feature the sound of Scotty Moore's L-5. Nashville session guitarist Hank Garland, who also recorded acclaimed jazz albums before his near-fatal automobile accident, frequently played an L-5, as did jazz guitarist Wes Montgomery. A little known fact – the L-5 is the guitar that Groucho Marx kept by his side throughout his private life. Though not widely known, Marx played the guitar well. Contemporary guitarists who play and have played an L-5 on notable recordings as well as live include the late Jerry Miller of Moby Grape, Tuck Andress from Tuck and Patti, Melvin Sparks, Lee Ritenour, George Van Eps, and Howard Roberts (who used his L-5 to record the opening bars of the iconic theme for The Twilight Zone). John Mayer uses one on his 2008 live CD/DVD Where the Light Is. Eric Clapton used an L-5 to record Reptile (2001) and also used one on his 2002 live CD/DVD One More Car, One More Rider during the songs "Reptile", and "Somewhere Over the Rainbow".

Early players of the L-5 include Eddie Lang, and Maybelle Carter from The Carter Family, who played her now-famous 1928 model for the majority of her career. Maybelle Carter's L-5 is now kept in the Country Music Hall of Fame in Nashville, Tennessee. Django Reinhardt played an L-5 fitted with a DeArmond pickup during his tour with Duke Ellington November 1946. Groucho Marx is seen playing his L-5 in the 1932 Marx Brothers film Horse Feathers. Clint Eastwood featured an L-5 in the 1982 movie Honkytonk Man. This had a cutaway (introduced in 1939), unlikely in a story set during the Great Depression.

Comedian and singer George Gobel had a special version of the Gibson L-5 archtop guitar custom designed and gifted to him by his friend Milton Berle in 1958, the "L-5CT" (cutaway, thin), featuring diminished dimensions of neck scale (24 3/4") and body depth (2 3/8"), befitting his own small stature, and a cherry red finish (for optimal appearance on Gobel's new color TV show). About 45 L-5CT's were produced from 1958 to 1963, making them one of the rarest Gibson models. Most of these were acoustic guitars, although a few were shipped with pickups. The rarest L5 model was a close relative of the L-5CT. It was called the "Crest"*. It was conceived by Gibson employee Andy Nelson (who helped to design the L-5CT) in 1961. It featured the same thinline body of the L-5CT, but the new-for-1961 "florentine" cutaway shape, Super 400-style fretboard inlays, and a unique knight/shield crest design on the headstock. Only six Crests were produced (all in 1961), and no two were identical. Gibson produced another model called a "Crest" in 1969–70, but this was a different type of instrument, similar to an ES-330, but with a rosewood body and floating pickups.

In the 1970s, Gibson produced the L-5S, which was effectively a solid-body version of the L-5 archtop. It was used by Pat Martino, Paul Simon and, from 1973 to 1976, by Mark Farner of Grand Funk Railroad (he is seen with the guitar in cover photographs on the band's 1975 live album Caught in the Act); and a custom-made single-pickup version was made for Ronnie Wood, who loaned it to Keith Richards for his 1988 tour with the X-Pensive Winos. A double cutaway version of the L-5 has recently been introduced to the market. The body depth has been reduced to 2 3/8". The upper cutaway is purely cosmetic, since the neck base or heel prevents higher access to the frets.

== Gallery ==
=== Variation models mentioned above ===
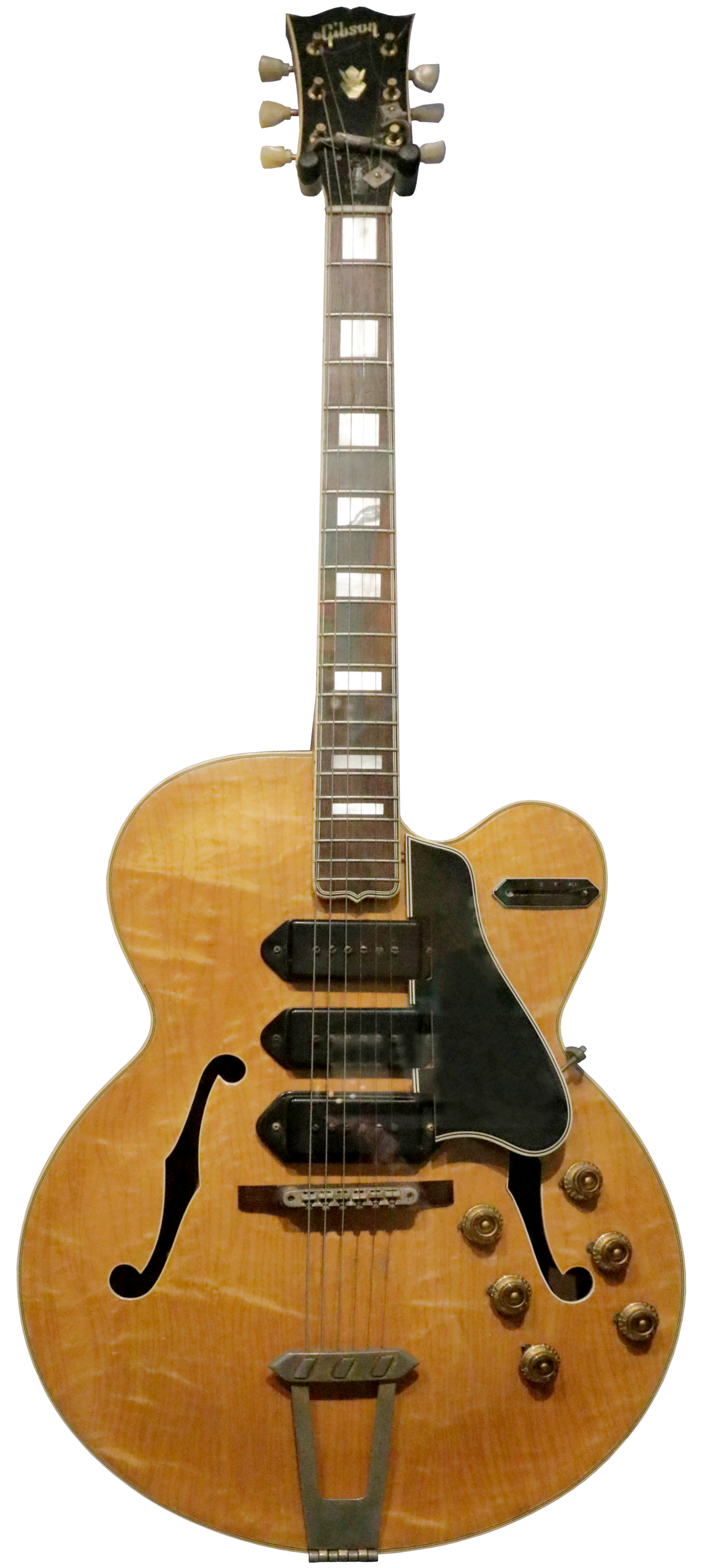
[ES-Series electric]
ES-5 Switchmaster ([1949]/1955–1962)
(Switchmaster with P-90 was (1955–1957))

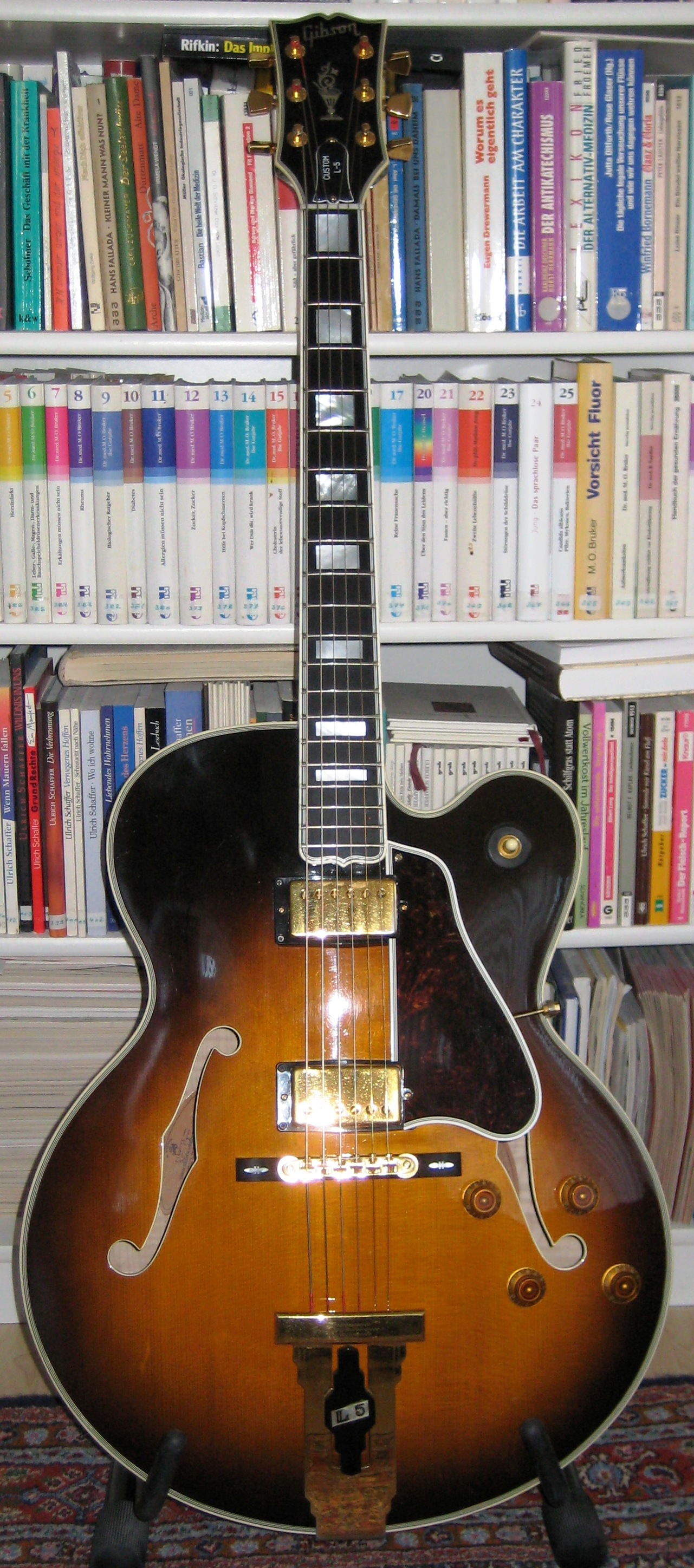
[L-Series electric]
L-5 CES electric guitar (1951–)

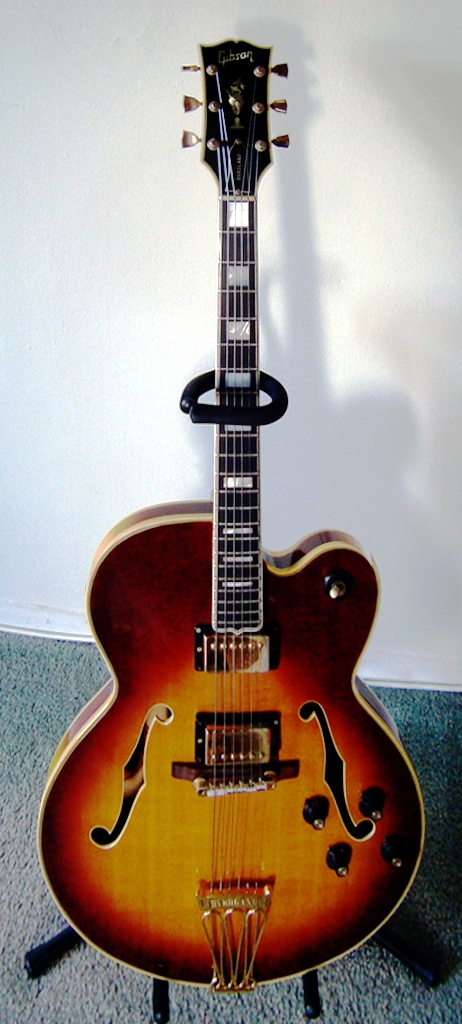
[thinline, short ver.]
c.f. Byrdland (1957–)
(thinline, narrower neck, 23 1/2" short-scale version)

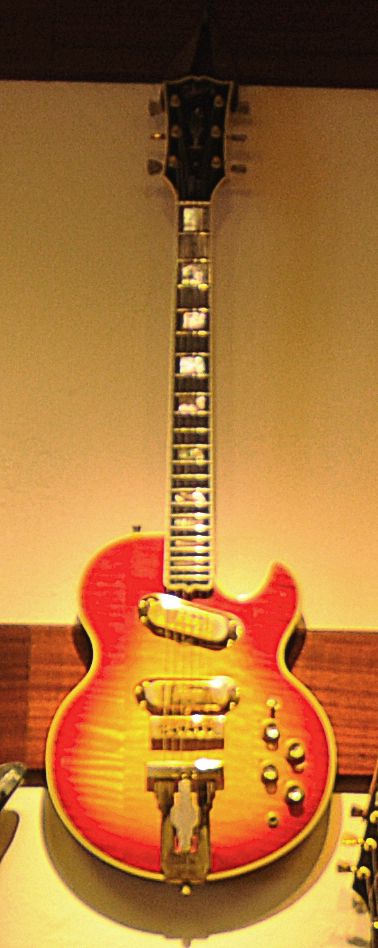
[solid guitar ver.]
L5-S solid-body guitar (1972–1980s)

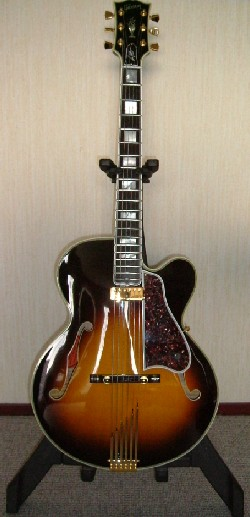
[signature model]
L-5 Lee Ritenour Signature (2003–)
