= Marie Marie =

1980 song by The Blasters

Song by the Blasters

from the album American Music
- Released: 1980
- Studio: Rollin' Rock Studio
- Length: 2:00
- Label: Rollin' Rock
- Songwriter(s): Dave Alvin
- Producer(s): Ronny Weiser

"Marie Marie"

Single by the Blasters

from the album The Blasters
- B-side: "Hollywood Bed"
- Released: 1981
- Studio: United Western Studios, Los Angeles
- Genre: Rockabilly
- Length: 2:03
- Label: Slash; Warner Bros.
- Songwriter(s): Dave Alvin
- Producer(s): The Blasters

"Marie Marie" is a song by American rock and roll band the Blasters. It became an international success after being covered by Welsh rock and roll singer Shakin' Stevens.

== Composition and releases ==
The song was originally released in 1980 on the Blaster's debut album American Music on the small independent label Rollin' Rock. It was then re-recorded a year later for the Blaster's second album The Blasters, released by Slash Records and distributed by Warmer Bros. This album had much better distribution than their first album and "Marie Marie" was released as a single in Australia in 1981 and France and the Netherlands in 1982.

Dave Alvin has said "Marie Marie" was "the third or fourth song I wrote with the Blasters". After joining the Blasters, Alvin came up with the melody, thinking "this would be a great Cajun Balfa Brothers kind of song, and then if you put it to a Chuck Berry beat, this might be pretty cool". However, he couldn't think of any lyrics and the band had a rehearsal the next evening. "About 30 minutes before we left to go to rehearsal, I sat down at our kitchen table and I just wrote the lyrics – just came to me. I was kind of – I remember being a little kid and we were driving down this road up near the Puente Hills. And there was an old Victorian farmhouse and there was a girl sitting on the porch with a guitar. And for whatever reason, that image stuck with me and so I just wrote that. So in like 20 minutes we had [the song]."

After its success by Shakin' Stevens, Alvin was called up by Stevens asking if he'd become his official songwriter. However, Alvin turned down the offer, saying "‘I don’t know about that! I don’t know where these come from, Mr. Stevens, so I don’t know if I can become an official songwriter for you".

== Shakin' Stevens version ==
"Marie, Marie"

Single by Shakin' Stevens

from the album Marie, Marie
- B-side: "Baby If We Touch"
- Released: 18 July 1980
- Recorded: 1980
- Studio: Eden Studios, London
- Genre: Rock and roll
- Length: 2:40
- Label: Epic
- Songwriter(s): Dave Alvin
- Producer(s): Stuart Colman

Shakin' Stevens singles chronology
"Hey Mae" (1980)	"Marie, Marie" (1980)	"Shooting Gallery" (1980)

Stevens released his cover of the song in July 1980 as the third single from his album Marie, Marie (later re-released as This Ole House). The single peaked at number 19 on the UK Singles Chart, becoming Stevens' first Top-20 UK hit.

=== Release ===
Despite being released in July, the single did not enter the UK Singles Chart until the second week of August, staying in the chart for ten weeks. In Germany, it entered the chart at the beginning of 1981, reaching its peak on the second week of June, staying in the chart for a total of 29 weeks.

In the US and Canada, an EP titled Shakin' Stevens was released, comprising four songs: "Marie, Marie" and the single's B-side "Baby If We Touch", "Hey Mae", which was Steven's previously released single, and "Is a Bluebird Blue", a cover of the Dan Penn song, first released by Conway Twitty in 1960. It had featured on Stevens' previous album Take One!.

=== Reception ===
The single was reviewed twice in Record Mirror. Firstly by Mike Nicholls who described it as "blandly uptempo", and then by Amanda Nicholls who wrote "love the way he flexes his voice on this rock 'n' roll tune." In Smash Hits, Deanne Person described it as a "good ol' rock 'n' roll song with a touch of C&W in the vocals. As such it breaks no new ground, and doesn't leave much of an impression in the old. The sort of record that gets put on jukeboxes everywhere but never played.

=== Track listings ===
7"

1. "Marie, Marie" – 2:40
2. "Baby If We Touch" – 2:55

EP

1. "Marie, Marie" – 2:44
2. "Hey Mae" – 2:30
3. "Is a Bluebird Blue" – 3:01
4. "Baby If We Touch" – 2:59

=== Charts ===
Chart (1980–1981)	Peak position
Germany (GfK)	19
Ireland (IRMA)	28
UK Singles (OCC)	19
