= Romeo's Escape =

Studio album by Dave Alvin
- Released: 1987
- Recorded: 1986–87
- Studio: Rock Steady, Control Center, Airdrome, Los Angeles, California
- Genre: Folk rock, country rock
- Length: 44:04
- Label: Demon
- Producer: Steve Berlin, Mark Linett

Dave Alvin chronology
Romeo's Escape (1987)	Blue Blvd (1991)

Romeo's Escape is the debut album by American artist Dave Alvin, released in 1987. It was released in Europe as Every Night About This Time. It has been reissued multiple times under both titles. The album included three songs previously written and recorded by Alvin with the Blasters, ("Long White Cadillac", "Border Radio" and "Jubilee Train").

== Reception ==
Professional ratings
Review scores
Source	Rating
AllMusic	3.5/5 stars
Christgau's Record Guide	B+
The Encyclopedia of Popular Music	3/5 stars
MusicHound Rock: The Essential Album Guide	3.5/5 stars
The Rolling Stone Album Guide	3/5 stars

AllMusic critic Mark Deming wrote: "If Alvin was still getting his sea legs as a vocalist on Romeo's Escape, his emotional conviction and intelligent phrasing outweigh his somewhat limited range, and he's rarely rocked harder in the studio... Romeo's Escape left no doubt he had the goods to be a first-rate frontman, while his gifts as a guitarist and writer remained as strong as ever.." Robert Christgau stated that "Alvin's hoarse timbre, bellowing passion, and approximate pitch call up other songwriter front men—such dubious predecessors as John Prine and Guy Clark, who at least can claim to sound like themselves. Nevertheless, he's a born songwriter--guitarist." Jon Young, in Trouser Press, called it " familiar roots rock and country, ranging from scorching boogie ('New Tattoo') to the weary testimony of a union man ('Brother on the Line')."

== Track listing ==
All songs by Dave Alvin.

1. "Fourth of July" – 4:01
2. "Long White Cadillac" – 4:46
3. "Every Night About This Time" – 3:56
4. "Romeo's Escape" – 3:50
5. "Brother (On the Line)" – 4:14
6. "Jubilee Train" – 3:53
7. "Border Radio" – 3:34
8. "Far Away" – 4:33
9. "New Tattoo" – 3:46
10. "You Got Me" – 3:50
11. "I Wish It Was Saturday Night" – 3:38

== Personnel ==
Musicians

- Dave Alvin – vocals, guitar
- Gregg Sutton – bass on "Long White Cadillac", "Far Away" and "I Wish It Was Saturday Night"
- Gil T. Isais – bass
- Al Kooper – organ on "Far Away"
- Jerry Angel – drums
- Tony Gilkyson – guitar
- Greg Leisz – pedal steel guitar, lap guitar, guitar
- Steve Berlin – saxophone
- David Hidalgo – 8-string guitar on "Far Away", violin on "Brother (On the Line)", background vocals
- John "Juke" Logan – keyboards, harmonica
- Alan Graham – background vocals
- Matthew McCauley – background vocals
- Katy Moffatt – background vocals on "You Got Me" and "I Wish It Was Saturday Night"

Production

- Steve Berlin – producer
- Mark Linett – producer, engineer
- Melanie Nissen – design
- Lou Beach – cover art
