= New Tattoo (disambiguation) =

New Tattoo is an album by Mötley Crüe.

New Tattoo may also refer to:

- New Tattoo, an album by Tim Hicks
- "New Tattoo", a song by Dave Alvin from his album Romeo's Escape
