= 4-11-44 (album) =

Studio album by the Blasters
- Released: 2005
- Genre: Rock and roll
- Label: Rainman
- Producer: The Blasters

The Blasters chronology
Live Going Home (2004)	4-11-44 (2005)	Live 1986 (2011)

4-11-44 is an album by the American band the Blasters. It was released in the UK in late 2004, by Evangeline Records, and in the United States in 2005. The band supported the album with a North American tour.

== Production ==
The Blasters tried recording 4-11-44 twice, as a live album, but issues with record labels prevented a release. They were without Dave Alvin; the lineup that recorded 4-11-44 had been playing together for a decade. Phil Alvin and bass player John Bazz were the only founding members to participate in the recording sessions. "Rebound" is a cover of the Charlie Rich song. "Daddy Rollin' Stone" was written by Otis Blackwell. "Dry River" is a cover of the Dave Alvin song. The title track refers to a phrase about gambling. "Window Up Above" is a cover of the George Jones song.

== Critical reception ==
Professional ratings
Review scores
Source	Rating
AllMusic	3.5/5 stars
The Encyclopedia of Popular Music	3/5 stars
The Independent	3.5/5 stars
Lexington Herald-Leader	3/4 stars
The Philadelphia Inquirer	3/4 stars
Rolling Stone	2/5 stars

The Independent noted that, "what Dr Feelgood used to do in Essex, the Blasters still do, with added vitamin D, in California: guitars, bass, blues changes, kicking drummer, wittily parochial lyrics, a spot of reverb." Rolling Stone determined that "the edges (particularly on the production) have softened to the point where songs such as 'Love Is My Business' and 'Julie' come off like easy-listening oldies."

The Philadelphia Inquirer concluded that "the Blasters without Dave Alvin are not exactly Creedence minus John Fogerty... They're more akin to the Band without Robbie Robertson—a unit still capable of superb singing and playing." The Columbus Dispatch praised the "scorching lead guitar" of Keith Wyatt. The Albuquerque Journal deemed the album the same "good old rock 'n' roll that the band did so well 25 years ago."

AllMusic wrote: "There was an almost ministerial fervor to the group's original recordings, as if they needed to wake up an audience to a musical tradition that was on the verge of dying out; 4-11-44, on the other hand, sounds like a great roadhouse band rocking on out, but there isn't nearly as much force behind it."

== Track listing ==
No.	Title	Length
1.	"Daddy Rollin' Stone"
2.	"4-11-44"
3.	"Rebound"
4.	"It's All Your Fault"
5.	"Julie"
6.	"Dry River"
7.	"Your Kind of Love"
8.	"Love Is My Business"
9.	"Slip of the Tongue"
10.	"Precious Memories (The Only Hell My Mama Ever Raised)"
11.	"Boneyard (Dick Tracy Theme)"
12.	"Window Up Above"
13.	"Just to Be with You"
14.	"Fire of Love"
