= Mike Eldred =

Mike Eldred may refer to:

- Mike Eldred (guitarist) (born 1961), American guitarist and luthier
- Mike Eldred (singer) (born 1965), American musical theater performer
