= Ronny Weiser =

Ronny Weiser (born 1946 in Milan, Italy), also known as Rockin' Ronny Weiser, is an American record producer and founder of rockabilly record label Rollin' Rock.

In Milan, Ronny discovered American rock'n'roll and rockabilly watching an Elvis Presley film, Loving You. Upon immigrating to the United States in the 1960s, he published a rockabilly fanzine called Rollin' Rock, which evolved into full-fledged record label Rollin' Rock. In 1970, Rollin' Rock started reissuing 1950s recordings, and eventually recorded and released new recordings by 1950s artists such as Ray Campi, Mac Curtis, Gene Vincent, Alvis Wayne, Charlie Feathers, Johnny Carroll, Bill Haley's Comets, Narvel Felts and contemporary rockabilly artists such as The Blasters during the 1970s and 1980s.
