= Hard Line (album) =

Studio album by the Blasters
- Released: February 1985
- Genre: Roots rock
- Label: Slash
- Producer: Jeff Eyrich

The Blasters chronology
Non Fiction (1983)	Hard Line (1985)	The Blasters Collection (1990)

Hard Line is the fourth album by the American roots rock band the Blasters, released in 1985. Dave Alvin quit the band shortly after the album's release. The album peaked at No. 86 on the Billboard 200.

The song "Dark Night" was featured in the film From Dusk till Dawn.

== Production ==
The album was produced by Jeff Eyrich, who had attended the same high school as brothers Dave and Phil Alvin, the band's main songwriter and lead vocalist, respectively. John Cougar Mellencamp wrote and produced one song; Mellencamp's producer, Don Gehman, produced "Just Another Sunday". The album was recorded in Los Angeles and Nashville. Stan Lynch, David Hidalgo, and Larry Taylor appear on Hard Line.

== Critical reception ==
Professional ratings
Review scores
Source	Rating
AllMusic	3.5/5 stars
Christgau's Record Guide	A
The Encyclopedia of Popular Music	3/5 stars
The Rolling Stone Album Guide	2.5/5 stars
Spin Alternative Record Guide	7/10

Trouser Press wrote that the "highlights include 'Trouble Bound' and 'Help You Dream', both featuring the Jordanaires." The Washington Post thought that "Dave Alvin's songwriting has grown dramatically -- the melodies are finally as prominent as the rhythms, and the lyrics tell the hand-me-down stories of the best folk songs." The Chicago Tribune called Dave Alvin "one of the most underrated lyricists in popular music." The Los Angeles Times wrote that "the Blasters [have] become secure enough musically to lower the instrumental voltage and let Phil Alvin’s vocals take center stage." The Sun Sentinel opined that "the Blasters sound as if they took a long trip through the United States and sponged up every pop music form they ran into."

== Track listing ==
All tracks written by Dave Alvin, except where noted.

No.	Title	Length
1.	"Trouble Bound"	3:48
2.	"Just Another Sunday" (Alvin, John Doe)	4:15
3.	"Hey, Girl"	3:11
4.	"Dark Night"	3:51
5.	"Little Honey" (Alvin, Doe)	3:35
6.	"Samson and Delilah" (Traditional)	3:47
7.	"Colored Lights" (John Cougar Mellencamp)	3:27
8.	"Help You Dream"	3:40
9.	"Common Man"	3:43
10.	"Rock & Roll Will Stand"	2:38
Total length:		35:55

== Personnel ==
- Phil Alvin – vocals, guitar
- Dave Alvin – lead guitar
- Bill Bateman – drums
- John Bazz – bass guitar
- Gene Taylor - piano
