= Phil Alvin =

American singer and guitarist (born 1953)

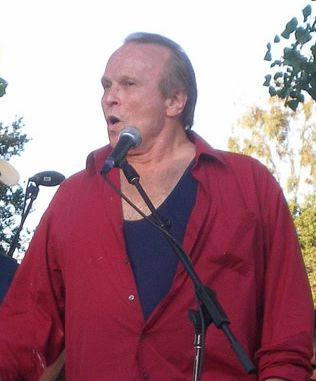
- Phil Alvin, July 4, 2009, Irvine, California

Background information
- Born: Philip Joseph Alvin; March 6, 1953 (age 73); Downey, California, U.S.
- Genres: Rock, roots rock
- Occupations: Vocalist, musician, songwriter
- Instruments: Vocals, guitar, harmonica
- Website: www.theblasters.com

Philip Joseph Alvin (born March 6, 1953) is an American singer and guitarist known primarily as the leader of the rock band The Blasters. His voice has been described as "robust...powerful...rich, resonant, [and] supremely confident."

== Biography ==
Alvin grew up in Downey, California in a music-loving family where he and his younger brother Dave Alvin were exposed to blues, rockabilly, and country. Inspired and influenced by the music they grew up with, Phil and Dave formed the rock and roll band The Blasters in the late 1970s with fellow Downey residents Bill Bateman and John Bazz. The group released four studio albums between 1980 and 1985. While never achieving mass market success on the music charts, the group's recordings and concerts drew critical acclaim and a cult following across the United States and Europe.

In 1986, after The Blasters had disbanded, Alvin released a solo album, Un "Sung Stories". He then returned to graduate school at California State University, Long Beach, where he eventually earned a master's degree in mathematics and artificial intelligence. Numerous accounts have stated that Alvin earned a Ph.D. degree. Incidentally, before launching his music career, Alvin had taught mathematics at the same university.

When The Blasters reconvened in 1986 without Dave Alvin, who was pursuing a solo career and other projects, Phil resumed his role as the band's lead vocalist, rhythm guitarist, and harmonica player. In 1994, he released a second solo album, County Fair 2000. In 2005, under Alvin's leadership, a revised configuration of The Blasters released 4-11-44, the first studio album from the group since 1985. The band followed that effort in 2012 with the studio album, Fun On Saturday Night.

In June 2012, while playing in Spain with The Blasters, Alvin had a near-death experience owing to an infection from an abscessed tooth. Though he had an emergency tracheotomy and flatlined twice, he recovered with his voice intact.

In 2014, Phil and Dave Alvin released the album Common Ground, a selection of Big Bill Broonzy covers, as a duo. It was the first studio collaboration by the Alvin brothers since the mid-1980s. They followed up with Lost Time in 2015.

More than 40 years after The Blasters got started, and despite ongoing health concerns in recent years, Phil Alvin remains their frontman. The lineup includes two other original members, John Bazz and Bill Bateman, as well as Keith Wyatt.

According to The Blasters web site, Phil has been hospitalized since January 1, 2023. A link with Sweet Relief has been set up to help pay Phil’s medical expenses.

== Discography ==
=== with The Blasters ===
- American Music (1980)
- The Blasters (1981)
- Over There (Live at The Venue, London) (1982) 6-song EP
- Non Fiction (1983)
- Hard Line (1985)
- The Blasters Collection (1990)
- Testament: The Complete Slash Recordings (2002)
- Trouble Bound (2002)
- The Blasters Live: Going Home (2004)
- 4-11-44 (2005) with Keith Wyatt
- Live 1986 (2011)
- Fun On Saturday Night (2012) with Keith Wyatt
- Dark Night: Live in Philly (2019) with Hollywood Fats
- Mandatory: The Best of The Blasters (2023)

=== Solo albums ===
- Un "Sung Stories" (1986)
- County Fair 2000 (1994)
- Common Ground: Dave & Phil Alvin Play and Sing the Songs of Big Bill Broonzy (with Dave Alvin) (2014)
- Lost Time (with Dave Alvin) (2015)

== The Blasters videography ==
- Streets of Fire (1984)
- The Blasters Live: Going Home (2004)
