= Un "Sung Stories" =

Studio album by Phil Alvin
- Released: 1986
- Genres: Roots rock, jazz, blues
- Label: Slash

Phil Alvin chronology
Un "Sung Stories" (1986)	County Fair 2000 (1994)

Un "Sung Stories" is the first solo album by the American musician Phil Alvin, released in 1986. Alvin supported the album with a North American tour. He then returned to his graduate studies in mathematics.

== Production ==
Sun Ra's Arkestra and the Dirty Dozen Brass Band contributed to the album. The Arkestra played on three homages to Cab Calloway: "The Old Man of the Mountain", "Brother Can You Spare a Dime?" and "The Ballad of Smokey Joe".

"Daddy Rollin' Stone" is the only track on the album that was composed after World War II.

== Critical reception ==
Professional ratings
Review scores
Source	Rating
AllMusic	4.5/5 stars
Robert Christgau	A−
MusicHound Rock: The Essential Album Guide	2.5/5 stars
The Rolling Stone Album Guide	2/5 stars

Trouser Press called Un "Sung Stories" "a delightful solo album of blues, gospel and jazz goodies." Robert Christgau opined that Alvin "loves a good lyric, and if he can't write them or order them up, he has only to ransack his record collection for oldies that are just strange enough." The Sacramento Bee noted that "Alvin has trimmed some of the excessive stylization of some of his Blasters work, and deepened the bluesy feel in his voice."

The Chicago Tribune deemed the album "an offbeat mix of musical Americana that includes gospel, country blues and pop anthems of the 1920s and '30s." The Los Angeles Times wrote that "Alvin's forceful arrangements fuses the material with dark, funny, frightening and inspiring edges... The result is an album that suggests a heroic grappling with the struggles involved in daily living." The San Francisco Chronicle determined that "the whole enterprise has a slightly esoteric feel, but when the collaborations click, such as the funky 'The Ballad of Smokey Joe' or the rollicking 'Daddy Rollin' Stone', the results provide minor musical gems, unexpected rewards and enough high points to declare Alvin's daring worthwhile."

AllMusic wrote: "Short and sweet, Un 'Sung Stories' is a true gem that's richly felt in a way a collection of 'old standards' is not expected to be." The Spin Alternative Record Guide likened Alvin to a "West-Coast Buster Poindexter," and considered the album "pleasant."

== Track listing ==
No.	Title	Length
1.	"Someone Stole Gabriel's Horn"	3:15
2.	"Next Week Sometime"	2:31
3.	"The Ballad of Smokey Joe"	4:38
4.	"Death in the Morning"	2:50
5.	"The Old Man of the Mountain"	2:55
6.	"Daddy Rollin' Stone"	3:34
7.	"Titanic Blues"	3:04
8.	"Brother Can You Spare a Dime?"	4:08
9.	"Collins' Cave"	3:47
10.	"Gangster's Blues"	3:26

== Personnel ==
- Phil Alvin – vocals, guitar
- Lee Allen – tenor saxophone (1)
- David Carroll – drums
- Richard Greene – violin
- Gary Masi – guitar
- Mike Roach – guitar
- Gene Taylor – piano
- Larry Taylor – bass
- Jubilee Train Singers – backing vocals (4)

Sun Ra and the Arkestra (3, 5, 8)

- Fred Adams – trumpet
- Marshall Allen – flute, alto sax
- Bruce Edwards – guitar
- Alvin Evans – flugelhorn, trumpet
- John Gilmore – clarinet, tenor sax
- Tyrone Hill – trombone
- James Jackson – bassoon
- Stanley Morgan – conga drums
- Arthur O'Neil – drums
- Sun Ra – piano
- Rollo Radford – bass
- Leroy Taylor – bass clarinet, alto sax
- Danny Thompson – alto sax, baritone sax
- June Tyson – vocals
- Ronald Wilson – tenor sax

The Dirty Dozen Brass Band (1)

- Gregory Davis – trumpet
- Kevin Harris – tenor sax
- Charles Joseph – trombone
- Kirk Joseph – sousaphone
- Benny Jones Jr. – bass drum
- Roger Lewis – baritone sax, soprano sax
- Jenell Marshall – snare drum
- Ephram Powns – trumpet
