= Gibson L5S =

Solid-body electric guitar

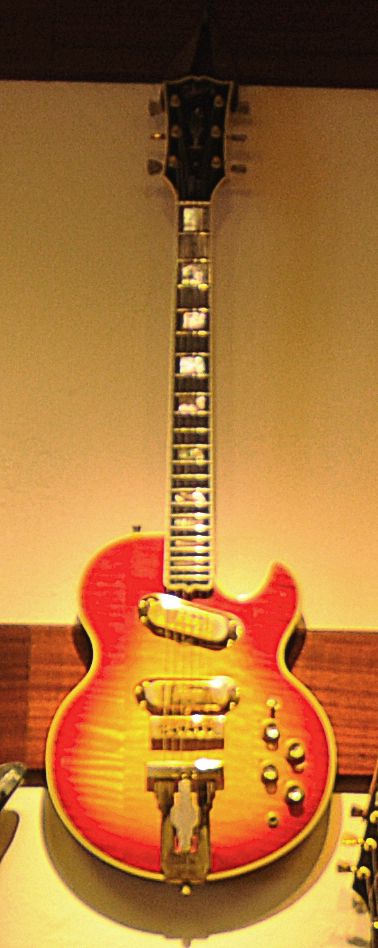
Gibson L5S

The Gibson L5S is a solid-body electric guitar model produced by the Gibson Guitar Corporation.

== Description and history ==
Introduced in 1972, the Gibson L5S was essentially a smaller, thinner solid-body version of the popular Gibson L-5 hollowbody. Like the L-5, it featured multiple binding on the single-cutaway 3-ply solid maple body, 5-piece maple neck, and headstock, and also featured an ebony fingerboard with block inlays. The headstock featured a flower-pot inlay similar to the L-5 archtop and most L5S models featured the L-5 trapeze tailpiece (though some had stop-bar or TP-6 fine-tuning tailpieces). The L5S was available in various finishes, such as ebony, cherry sunburst, wine red and natural.

Upon its introduction in 1972, the L5S featured two low-impedance pickups, similar to those found on several Gibson Les Paul models of that period, such as the Recording model, the Signature model, the Personal model, and the Professional model. This incarnation of the model was not a success, however, thus Gibson switched from low-impedance pickups to regular humbucker Super Humbucking Tarback pickups, which were designed by Bill Lawrence. Though it was considered one of Gibson's more top-of-the-line models, it was still not particularly popular among guitarists. In the mid-1980s, the L5S was dropped from the Gibson line. L5-S guitars were produced with a one-piece top and back (very rare), two-piece top and back (also quite rare). The Norlin era in the production of Gibson guitars did not pass over the L5-S model, and that is why guitars with a three-piece top and back are the most common. Probably they were saving on materials and that's why they started gluing tops from three pieces. Today, the L5-S is sought after by collectors and blues and jazz musicians, the sound of the L5-S is clear and warm. They work great with different types of music. Today it is extremely difficult to find a guitar with the original Tarback pickups. Only 1,813 units were produced, according to Gibson.

== Notable L5S players ==
The L5S was a unique high-end solid body, and once Gibson equipped it with humbuckers, it drew the attention of guitarists, jazz and fusion virtuosos like Pat Martino and John McLaughlin. Additionally other players picked up the L5S such as Paul Simon and others including possibly Keith Richards at one time. Ronnie Wood has been seen playing a new incarnation of the Gibson L5S which is currently a signature model in production, the 'Ronnie Wood L-5S'as well as Mark Farner from Grand Funk.
