= Mac Curtis =

American rockabilly singer-songwriter (1939–2013)

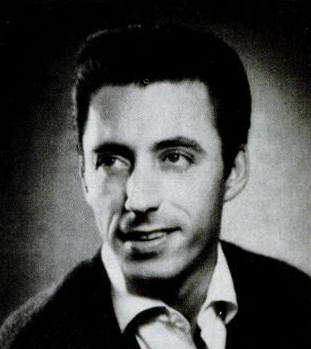
- Curtis in 1970

Background information
- Birth name: Wesley Erwin Curtis, Jr.
- Born: January 16, 1939; Fort Worth, Texas, U.S.
- Died: September 16, 2013 (aged 74); Weatherford, Texas, U.S.
- Genres: Rockabilly
- Occupation: Singer

Wesley Erwin "Mac" Curtis, Jr. (January 16, 1939 – September 16, 2013) was an American rockabilly musician.

== Biography ==
Born in Fort Worth, Texas, Curtis began playing guitar at the age of 12, entering local talent competitions. In 1954, his family moved to Weatherford, Texas, and while there he formed a band with two classmates, Jim and Ken Galbraith. They played at school events, but during one of the events, their show was shut down due to sexually suggestive on-stage movements. Instead, the group played locally, and in 1955 they were offered a deal with King Records, who released their debut single, "If I Had Me a Woman".

Soon afterwards, Alan Freed heard the group and invited them to play on his Christmas radio special in 1956. Curtis returned to Weatherford to finish school in 1957, and then became a disc jockey in Seoul, Korea after joining the military. Upon his return in 1960, he continued work as a DJ in the South, and released a few albums; his 1968 release, The Sunshine Man, hit No. 35 on the U.S. Country albums chart. As rockabilly grew in popularity in the 1970s, he began recording with Ray Campi and signed to Ronnie Weiser's Rollin' Rock Records. In 1970, Mac Curtis had two hits on Billboard Hot Country Songs chart, "Early In The Morning" (#35) and "Honey, Don't" (#43). As a singer he was still active in the 1980s and 1990s. He was later elected to the Rockabilly Hall of Fame.

He died on September 16, 2013, at age 74, following injuries received in a car accident a month earlier, after which he had undergone rehabilitation in a nursing home.

== Albums ==
Year	TITLE/track listing	Catalog number
Epic Records (US)
1969	SUNSHINE MAN Little Ole Wine Drinker / The Friendly City / Break My Mind / Love's Been Good To Me / Too Good To Be True / Too Close To Home / The Quiet Kind / Sunshine Man / I've Got The Tiger By The Tail / Almost Persuaded / It's My Way	BN 26419 (LP)
GRT Records (US)
1970	EARLY IN THE MORNING Early In The Morning / Big Boss Man / Ain't That A Shame / Blues Man / Baby What You Want Me To Do / Maybelline / Gulf Stream Line / Stagger Lee / I'd Run A Mile / I Got A Woman / Where The Hurt Moves In / Him Or Me (What's It Gonna Be)	LP 20002 (LP)
Rollin' Rock Records (US)
1973	RUFFABILLY Big D Women / Baby Let's Play House / Heartbreakin' Mama / Fannie Mae / Sidetrack Mama / Holdin' On / Good Rockin' Tonight / Amarillo Killer / Hot Rock / Crazy Crazy Lovin' / Wild Wild Women / You Hurt Me / Sexy Ways	LP 002 (LP)
1975	GOOD ROCKIN' TOMORROW Good Rockin' Tomorrow / Wake Up Rock 'n' Roll Rock-A-Baby / Hard Hearted Girl / Party Line / Turn To Me / For Your Love / Rockabilly Uprising / Been Gone A Long Time / Juice Box / Gone Out Of My Mind / Wildcat Tamer / Let's Go	LP 002 (LP)
1978	ROCK ME Sidething / That's How Much I Love You / Turn Away From Me / Making It Right / Real Good Itch / She Knows All The Good Ways To Be Bad / Suntan Girl / You Can't Take The Boogie Woogie Out Of Me / I'd Run A Mile To You / Good Love Sweet Love / Don't You Love Me / Rock Me	LP 016 (LP)
Sunshine Records (US)
1977	GOLDEN GOSPEL FAVORITES I'm Gonna Walk Them Golden Stairs / He'll Understand And Say Well Done / Swing Down Chariot / Just A Little Talk With Jesus / This Old Building / His Hand In Mine / When God Dips His Pen / Milky White Way / Where Could I Go / It's Different Now	SS 001 (LP)
Radar Records (UK)
1979	ROCKIN' MOTHER Ducktail / Grandaddy's Rockin' / You Oughta See Granma Rock / How Long Will It Take / If I Had Me A Woman / Good Rockin' Tomorrow / Rockin' Mother / How Come It / Slip Slip Slippin' In / Johnny Carroll Rock / Turn Away From Me / That Ain't Nothin' But Right / Crazy Crazy Lovin' / Hungry Hill collection of Rollin' Rock masters	RAD 22 (LP)
Rebel (FIN)
1981	TEXAS ROCKABILLY LEGEND Rock Me / If I Had Me A Woman / Slip Slip Slippin' In / Turn To Me / I'd Run A Mile To You / Hungry Hill / Johnny Carroll Rock / Pistol Packin' Mama / Ducktail / Making It Right / Sidething / Good Rockin' Tomorrow / Been Gone A Long Time / She Knows All The Good Ways To Be Bad collection of Rollin' Rock masters	ROLLS 004 (LP)
1981	TOP CAT ON ROCKABILLY TRACK Rockin' Mother / Rockabilly Uprising / Suntan Girl / Wildcat Tamer / That Ain't Nothin' But Right / Grandaddy's Rockin' / Amarillo Killer / How Come It / Hard Hearted Girl / Keep Doin' What You're Doin' Now / How Long Will It Take / For Your Love / You Oughta See Granma Rock / Turn Away From Me collection of Rollin' Rock masters	ROLLS 004 (LP)
Hot Rock Records (UK)
1981	TRUCKABILLY I'm Gonna Be A Wheel Someday / Goosebumps / Good Rockin' Teddy / Wishin 'n' Prayin' / The Hucklebuck / I'm Gonna Love You Back To Loving Me Again / Rockin' Pneumonia And The Boogie Woogie Flu / Train Of Sin / Just a Little Too Much / Hooked On Music / Turn To Me / Little Miss Linda / Don't Forbid Me / Hollywood City	HR-701 (LP)
Rollin' Rock Records (CH)
1995	THE ROLLIN' ROCK & REBEL SINGLES Ducktail / Sidetrack Mama / You Oughta See Granma Rock / Grandaddy's Rockin' / How Come It / Slip Slip Slippin' In / Johnny Carroll Rock / Rockin' Mother / Keep Doin' What You're Doin' Now / Pistol Packin' Mama / Been Gone A Long Time / Making It Right / For Your Love / Turn Away From Me / If I Had Me A Woman / That Ain't Nothin' But Right / Rollin' Rock Rock / How Long Will It Take / Tell Me What'll I Do collection of Rollin' Rock masters	RRCD 004 (CD)
Hightone Records/HMG (US)
1997	ROCKABILLY UPRISING If I Had Me A Woman / Good Rockin' Tomorrow / Party Line / Ducktail / I'd Run A Mile To You / Wild Wild Women / That's How Much I Love You / You Can't Take The Boogie Woogie Out Of Me / Grandaddy's Rockin' / Turn Away From Me / Sidething / How Come It / Wake Up Rock 'n' Roll / Hard Hearted Girl / More Love Where That Came From / Real Good Itch / Turn To Me / For Your Love / Suntan Girl collection of Rollin' Rock masters	6601 (CD)
Vinyl Japan Records (UK)
1998	ROCKABILLY READY Rockabilly Ready / The Love Doctor / Show Me The Money / Tell Me What'll I Do / Old Rock 'n' Rollers Like Me / Miss Linda's Still Fine / One Foot Loose / Blues Man / Let's Go Downtown / Keep On Rockin' / Hey Hey Little Lady / Mesmerized / Are You Ready To Rumble / Side Wind / Little Mama Have Mercy / Frantic	JRCD 31 (CD)
Bluelight Records (FIN)
1999	EARLY IN THE MORNING Early In The Morning / Big Boss Man / Ain't That A Shame / Blues Man / Baby What You Want Me To Do / Maybelline / Gulf Stream Line / Stagger Lee / I'd Run A Mile / I Got A Woman / Where The Hurt Moves In / Him Or Me (What's It Gonna Be) re-issue of GRT album	BLR 3367 2 (CD)
2011	SONGS I WISH I WROTE Singer Of Sad Songs / This Time Tomorrow / 100 Pounds Of Honey / Sunshine Man / Turn Away From Me / One More Night / Stay Love / Beautiful Annabel Lee / So What Let It Rain / Drowning All My Sorrows / If You Want To Be My Woman / Restless / You’ve Turned Down The Lights	BLR 33147 2 (CD) BLR 33147 1 (LP)
2018	THE MAC CURTIS SINGLES COLLECTION 1956-1965

== Singles ==
Year	Songs A/B	Catalog number
King Records (US)
1956	If I Had Me A Woman / Just So You Call Me	45-4927
1956	Granddaddy's Rockin’ / Half Hearted Love	45-4949
1956	You Ain't Treatin' Me Right / The Low Road	45-4965
1956	That Ain't Nothin' But Right / Don't You Love Me	45-4995
1957	Say So / I'll Be Gentle	45-5059
1958	What You Want / You Are My Very Special Baby	45-5107
1958	Little Miss Linda / Missy Ann	45-5121
Felsted Records (US)
1960	Come Back Baby / No Never Alone	45-8592-V
Le Cam Records (US)
1962	Singing The Blues / Soho	339
1962	Dance Her By Me (One More Time) / You're The One	954
1965	Lie And Get By / I Just Ain't Got	965
Dot Records (US)
1962	Dance Her By Me (One More Time) / You're The One	45-16315
Brownfield Records (US)
1962	Doodle Doodle Do (And Forget About You) / Don't Take My Freedom	BF 27
Shah Records (US)
1962	Singing The Blues / Ballad Of Black Mountain	S 982
Limelight Records (US)
1963	12th Of June / Lie And Get By	Y 3010
Shalimar Records (US)
1963	Come On Back / 100 Pounds Of Honey	S-103
Maridene Records (US)
1964	100 Pounds Of Honey / Down The Pike	M-111
Tower Records (US)
1967	Stepping Out On You / The Ties That Bind	319
Epic Records (US)
1968	Too Close To Be True / Too Close To Home	5-10257
1969	Love's Been Good To Me / The Quiet Kind	5-10324
1969	Sunshine Man / It's My Way	5-10385
1969	Almost Persuaded / The Friendly City	5-10438
1969	Happiness Lives In This House / Little Ole Wine Drinker Me	5-10468
1969	Us / Don't Make Love	5-10530
1970	Honey Don't / Today's Teardrops	5-10574
GRT Records (US)
1970	Early In The Morning / When The Hurt Moves In	26
1971	Gulf Stream Line / I'd Run A Mile	41
Rollin' Rock Records (US)
1972	Ducktail / Sidetrack Mama	45-007
1974	Grandaddy's Rockin' / You Oughta See Granma Rock	45-016
1974	How Come It / Slip Slip Slippin' In	45-018
1975	Johnny Carroll Rock / Rockin' Mother	45-026
1975	What'll I Do / (B-side by Ray Campi)	45-029
1978	Keep Doin' What You're Doin' Now / Pistol Packin' Mama	45-043
Emcee Records (US)
1974	Pistol Packin' Mama / She Knows All The Good Ways To Be Bad	002
Ranwood Records (US)
1975	Asphalt Cowboy / Pistol Packin' Mama	R-1017
1975	Keep Doin' What You're Doin' Now / She Knows All The Good Ways To Be Bad	R-1033
1975	Nine Times Out Of Ten / More Like I Do Now	R-1041
1976	West Texas Women / We Made It All The Way	R-1050
Hot Rock Records (UK)
1980	Hot Rock Boogie // Half Hearted Love / The Hucklebuck	HR-001
1981	I'm Gonna Be A Wheel Someday / Goosebumps	HR-010
Rebel (FIN)
1981	Making It Right / Been Gone A Long Time	MAC 005
1981	For Your Love / Turn Away From Me	MAC 006

=== Charted singles ===
- "The Quiet Kind" (1968) #64 C&W
- "The Sunshine Man" (1968) #54 C&W
- "Happiness Lives In This House" (1969) #63 C&W
- "Don't Make Love" (1969) #60 C&W
- "Honey, Don't" (1970) #43 C&W
- "Early In The Morning" (1970) #35 C&W
