= Dark Night (song) =

Song by The Blasters

from the album Hard Line
- Released: 1985
- Genre: Swamp rock
- Length: 3:51
- Label: Slash
- Songwriter(s): Dave Alvin
- Producer(s): Jeff Eyrich

Dark Night is a song by The Blasters. It was first featured on the 1985 album Hard Line. The earliest offerings of the song in popular culture can be found in the 1985 episode "Whatever Works" in season 2 of the TV crime drama Miami Vice. It experienced a resurgence in popularity after being prominently featured in the 1996 Robert Rodriguez film From Dusk till Dawn as the opening and closing song. It also featured as the main theme in the 2005 motion picture, Dark Night.

== Reception ==
Spin wrote, "Dave Alvin's masterpiece is "Dark Night". His lyrics paint a timeless portrait of senseless bloodshed that could equally apply to the Hatfield-McCoy feud or barrio turf battles. The opening line, 'Hot air hangs like a dead man', and the cut's twangy bayou guitar licks chill to the marrow."
