= Non Fiction (The Blasters album) =

Studio album by the Blasters
- Released: 1983
- Recorded: January 1983
- Studio: Ocean Way
- Genre: Roots rock; R&B
- Length: 31:45
- Label: Slash
- Producer: The Blasters

The Blasters chronology
Over There: Live at the Venue, London (1982)	Non Fiction (1983)	Hard Line (1985)

Non Fiction is the third album by the American band the Blasters, released in 1983.

The album peaked at No. 95 on the Billboard 200.

== Production and release ==
The album was produced by the Blasters; the band intended for it to be a concept album about "lost dreams," and a refutation of their revivalist music party image. "Long White Cadillac" is dedicated to Hank Williams.

"Tag Along" is a cover of the Rocket Morgan song. The other cover song, "Barefoot Rock", was released as a single; much to the band's chagrin, their record label kept choosing the Blasters' covers as singles, rather than their originals.

== Critical reception ==
Professional ratings
Review scores
Source	Rating
AllMusic	4/5 stars
Robert Christgau	A
The Encyclopedia of Popular Music	3/5 stars
MusicHound Rock: The Essential Album Guide	2.5/5 stars
The Rolling Stone Album Guide	2.5/5 stars
Spin Alternative Record Guide	9/10

The Village Voice critic Robert Christgau thought that "this is r&b Jerry Lee could be proud of ... Dave Alvin writes with an objective colloquial intensity that fits the straight-ahead dedication of his cross-racial and -generational band." Trouser Press opined that the album "presents a series of well-crafted vignettes reminiscent of Robbie Robertson’s work with the Band." The Philadelphia Inquirer determined: "Choosing the simplest words to tell clear, vivid stories, lyricist Dave Alvin is one of the best writers in popular music."

The Washington Post wrote that "Phil Alvin's anguished voice is a treat... This singer, who can inflict a sense of torment on the silliest syllable, is one of rock's most underrated vocalists." The New York Times concluded that the Blasters "are able to conjure a vision of America that is uniquely their own with the help of Dave Alvin's snapshot-sharp images and deftly idiomatic music."

AllMusic wrote: "Like Television's Adventure and the New York Dolls' Too Much Too Soon, the Blasters' Non-Fiction followed an instant classic, and seemed like a disappointment on first glance, but give it a listen on its own terms, and it plays like the work of a great band working with heart, soul, and plenty of skill, and it's one of the finest roots rock discs of the '80s." The Spin Alternative Record Guide stated that "Alvin's tales of men leaving and sometimes returning, lost in boomtowns and bus stations, resemble the drugstore paperbacks of '50s writers like Jim Thompson." The San Diego Union-Tribune deemed Non Fiction the eighth best album of the 1980s.

== Track listing ==
All tracks written by Dave Alvin, except where noted.

No.	Title	Length
1.	"Red Rose"	2:31
2.	"Barefoot Rock" (LaCharles Harper, Joseph Scott)	2:29
3.	"Bus Station"	2:31
4.	"One More Dance"	2:26
5.	"It Must Be Love"	2:54
6.	"Jubilee Train"	3:00
7.	"Long White Cadillac"	2:54
8.	"Fool's Paradise"	2:44
9.	"Boomtown"	3:34
10.	"Leaving"	3:26
11.	"Tag Along" (Rodney Morgan)	2:53
Total length:		31:45

== Personnel ==
- Lee Allen – tenor saxophone
- Dave Alvin – composer, guitar, lyrics
- Phil Alvin – guitar, harmonica, vocals
- Bill Bateman – drums
- John Bazz – bass
- Steve Berlin – baritone saxophone
- The Blasters – producer
- Steve Crimmel – engineer
- Frank Gargani – photography
- Jim Hill – associate producer, engineer
- Laura Livingston – engineer
- Hudson Marquez – art direction, illustrations
- Gene Taylor – piano, vocals

== Charts ==
Chart (1983)	Peak position
United States (Billboard 200)	95
