= Stromberg Guitars =

Stromberg Guitars was an American company producing guitars, mainly for jazz musicians, between 1906 and 1955. They produced only around 640 guitars, and are noted for their craftsmanship, similar to the high standards of John D'Angelico. Stromberg's guitars are praised for their superb sound quality and for their contribution to the development of the jazz guitar.

== History ==
The company was founded by Charles Stromberg, a Swedish immigrant to Boston, Massachusetts, in 1906, who had learned the trade at the local Thompson & Odell company. His oldest son, Harry, worked with him until 1927, and in 1910, his son Elmer (later praised as responsible for "some of the finest archtop jazz guitars ever made") joined him in the business. Initially Stromberg was making mainly banjos and mandolins, but when in the 1920s the guitar began to replace the banjo among professional musicians Stromberg followed suit and in 1927 produced their first carved-top guitars. The first series was the G-series, 16 inches wide. In the 1930s, Stromberg followed the direction indicated by Gibson and other companies, and began increasing the size of their guitars, widening the G-series (G-1 and G-2) and the Deluxe models to 17 inches.

The company's reputation is based mainly on its Master 300 and 400 archtop guitars (the latter inspired by the Gibson Super 400). They were first introduced in 1937, during the big band era, and their "mammoth" size (19-inch width) gave them the necessary volume to compete with horn sections. Just before World War II they started producing instruments with a cutaway as well, most notably the G-5. Their guitars were admired by players like Barry Galbraith, who introduced the guitar to Hank Garland, a Nashville studio musician, who also ordered one. Innovation came from Elmer, who devised a new system to brace the top of the guitar.

Charles Stromberg died in 1955, followed at the end of the year by Elmer; the company passed to other owners.

== Legacy ==
Stromberg guitars are highly collectible and fetch significant prices: in the late 1960s or early 1970s Douglas B. Green reported being unable to afford an eight-thousand dollar Stromberg.

== Notable users ==
- Laurindo Almeida
- Barry Galbraith
- Douglas B. Green
- Freddie Green
- Vincent Gallo
- Fred Guy
- John Payne
- Tony Rizzi
- Chester J. Krolewicz "Chet Kruly"
- Mary Osborne
