= Mike Eldred (guitarist) =

American guitarist and luthier

- Born: California, United States
- Genres: Blues, rock, rockabilly
- Occupation(s): Guitarist, luthier
- Years active: 2000–present
- Formerly of: Mike Eldred Trio, Lee Rocker's Big Blue, Fender Custom Shop

Mike Eldred is an American guitarist and luthier. Eldred originally came to national attention while backing Lee Rocker in the mid-1990s. He also served as director of the Fender Custom Shop. He has put out four albums as leader of the Mike Eldred Trio.

== Career ==
=== Early career ===
Eldred, a native of California, started playing guitar at 14 when his parents bought him an instrument. He started building guitars at age 19 and was hired by the Charvel company in early 1979. He worked there for about eight or nine years, then joined Yamaha Corporation, where he also spent roughly eight or nine years.

Eldred also eventually started a blues band called The Blue Diamonds, which recorded a demo tape to get club bookings. The tape came to the notice of Brian Setzer of the Stray Cats, who were breaking up. Setzer passed his copy on to Stray Cats bass player Lee Rocker.

=== With Lee Rocker ===
Rocker and Eldred then formed Lee Rocker's Big Blue, which put out its first album in 1994 and its second in 1995. In a writeup of a 1996 live performance, the Los Angeles Times noted that Eldred's stinging guitar lines enhanced Rocker's singing.

Thanks to Eldred, among the debut's featured guests was Scotty Moore, well known for being Elvis Presley's studio and touring guitarist. Eldred had befriended Moore (then semi-retired) a couple of years before. As Moore recalled in his 2013 memoir, Eldred wrote Moore a letter that mentioned how much Moore influenced his playing. To Eldred's surprise, Moore responded and wound up driving from his home in Nashville to Memphis, Tennessee, where Big Blue was recording.

=== With the Fender Custom Shop ===
For many years, starting in the late 1990s, Eldred ran the custom shop division of Fender Musical Instruments Corporation, which designed high-end instruments for celebrity clients including Eric Clapton, ZZ Top, Brad Paisley, and Keith Urban.

Among the projects Eldred oversaw was the Tribute Series, in which replicas of axes used by guitar heroes such as Jimi Hendrix, Jeff Beck, and Rory Gallagher were made through a meticulous process of reverse engineering, carefully photographed. In 2007, Fender produced 250 copies of Stevie Ray Vaughan's well-worn guitar "Lenny" (one of his two performance workhorses). When Eldred disassembled the 1965 Stratocaster, he found to his surprise that it contained a component from his days at Charvel: a neck that had the name of ZZ Top guitarist Billy Gibbons written in pencil on the heel.

Eldred's technical insights into guitar gear are visible in several books, including Fender histories by author Tony Bacon.

Eldred left Fender in 2014 after a management shakeup.

=== With the Mike Eldred Trio ===
This group features Eldred as lead vocalist and primary songwriter in addition to playing guitar. It includes John Bazz, bass player for The Blasters.

The Mike Eldred Trio formed around 2000. It was visible playing out in the Los Angeles area as early as 2001.

The self-titled first album was released by Virgin France in 2002.

The second album, 61 & 49, came out in 2010. Guitar World magazine said that Eldred expertly led his trio into blues, rock and rockabilly territory, likening his playing to Hendrix as well as Vaughan. Guest musicians included old pal Scotty Moore, Ike Turner, and Cesar Rosas. The Los Angeles Times named "61 & 49" one of the Top Ten CD releases of 2011.

Elvis Unleaded followed in 2012. It consisted of 20 cover versions of Elvis Presley songs. The Arizona Daily Star described Eldred as "one of roots music's most celebrated guitarists."

The group's most recent album to date, Baptist Town (2016), was recorded at the famous Sun Studio in Memphis. It featured guest appearances from David Hidalgo, John Mayer, and Robert Cray.

The album drew praise in blues circles:

- “Baptist Town is an instant classic.” - Living Blues Magazine
- “Baptist Town is more than a special blues album. It weaves strands of contemporary blues music into historical account that defines American culture, originating in the South.” - Crossroads Blues Society

=== El Cabron Guitars ===
In May 2025, Eldred started his own company, manufacturing guitars in limited runs of five at a time.
