= The Blasters (album) =

Studio album by the Blasters
- Released: December 1981
- Studio: United Western
- Genre: Roots rock; rockabilly
- Length: 30:47
- Label: Slash, F-Beat
- Producer: The Blasters

The Blasters chronology
American Music (1980)	The Blasters (1981)	Over There: Live at the Venue, London (1982)

The Blasters is the second album by American rock band the Blasters. Originally released in the United States by the independent label Slash Records, its strong sales performance required a deal for wider distribution with Warner Bros. Records.

The album was well received, being ranked among the top 10 albums of 1982 by Time magazine and peaking at number 36 on Billboard's Pop Albums chart.

The album was issued in the United Kingdom via F-Beat Records. The British album featured different artwork from the American version, which depicts lead singer Phil Alvin in what was later described as "the way he contorts his face between almost every verse in his trademark grinning-skull grimace."

Three of the songs were re-recorded versions of material that first appeared on American Music. The band became a quintet on this album, with Gene Taylor joining on piano. Saxophone was supplied on several songs by guests Steve Berlin and Lee Allen.

== Critical reception ==
Professional ratings
Review scores
Source	Rating
AllMusic	4.5/5 stars
Christgau's Record Guide	A−
Rolling Stone	4/5 stars
Spin Alternative Record Guide	8/10

The Blasters was critically well received. Reviewing the album in 1982 for The Village Voice, Robert Christgau said that Phil Alvin has "easily the most expressive vocal style in all of nouveau rockabilly", while "Dave Alvin's originals introduce a major songwriter, one with John Fogerty's bead on the wound-tight good times of America's tough white underbelly, though his focus is shallower, sexual rather than spiritual." Rolling Stone critic Debra Rae Cohen praised the "bright, raw playing, terrific taste and... full-bodied vocals", while drawing special attention to the band's drummer, Bill Bateman, whose playing she indicated was "[t]he real key to the Blasters' exuberant authenticity". Trouser Press declared that the album "smokes" and that the band's performance was "tighter than a drum".

According to a 2002 PopMatters article, the national distribution of The Blasters was an eye-opener for listeners of "rockabilly, country, blues, and New Orleans roadhouse R&B," who found a band capable of producing new material that "stood up well to the influences from whence they sprang".

== Track listing ==
All songs composed by Dave Alvin, except where noted.

1. "Marie Marie" – 2:07
2. "No Other Girl" – 2:29
3. "I'm Shakin'" (Rudy Toombs) – 2:22
4. "Border Radio" – 2:47
5. "American Music" – 2:10
6. "So Long Baby Goodbye" – 2:24
7. "Hollywood Bed" – 3:33
8. "Never No Mo' Blues" (Elsie McWilliams, Jimmie Rodgers) – 2:47
9. "This Is It" – 2:15
10. "Highway 61" (Albert Luandrew) – 3:00
11. "I Love You So" (Bo Diddley) – 2:51
12. "Stop the Clock" (Bob Ehret, Damon Robertson) – 1:56

== Personnel ==
The Blasters

- Phil Alvin – guitar, harmonica, vocals
- Dave Alvin – lead guitar
- John Bazz – bass
- Bill Bateman – drums
- Gene Taylor – piano

Additional musicians

- Lee Allen – tenor saxophone
- Steve Berlin – baritone saxophone

Technical

- The Blasters – production
- Roger Harris – associate production, engineering
- Art Fein – associate production
- Pat Burnette – engineering
- David Ahlert – engineering (second engineer)
- Gustav Alsina – cover design
- Steve Bartel – art direction
