= Rollin' Rock =

American record label and magazine

Rollin' Rock is an American rockabilly record label founded by producer Ronny Weiser. Initially created as music magazine Rollin' Rock in 1969, the magazine became a full-fledged record label in 1970. Rollin' Rock got its start reissuing 50's recordings, but eventually recorded and released new recordings by 1950s artists such as Ray Campi and Mac Curtis, and contemporary rockabilly artists such as The Blasters (American Music, 1980) and The Chop Tops (Always Wild, 2000).
