= Scotty Moore =

American guitarist (1931–2016)

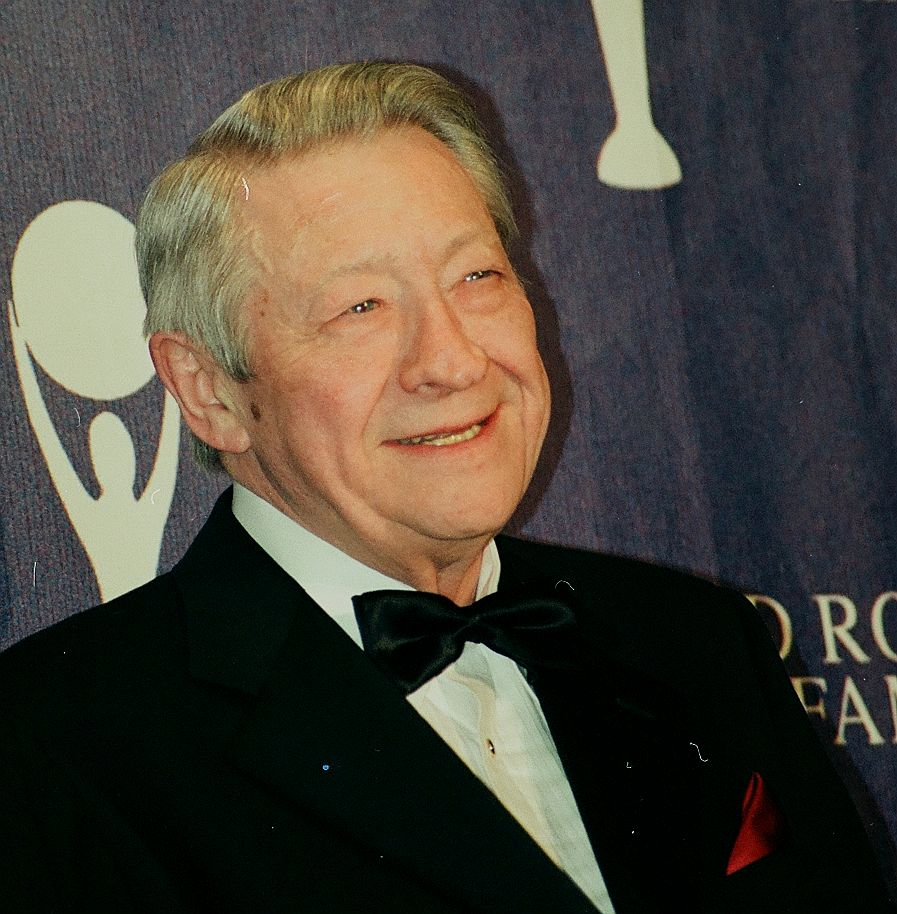
- Moore in 2000

Background information
- Born: Winfield Scott Moore III; December 27, 1931; Gadsden, Tennessee, U.S.
- Died: June 28, 2016 (aged 84) Nashville, Tennessee, U.S.
- Genres: Rock and roll; rockabilly; country
- Occupation: Musician
- Instrument: Guitar
- Years active: 1950s–2009
- Labels: Sun; RCA Victor
- Formerly of: The Blue Moon Boys
- Website: scottymoore.net

Winfield Scott Moore III (December 27, 1931 – June 28, 2016) was an American guitarist who formed the Blue Moon Boys in 1954, Elvis Presley's backing band. He was studio and touring guitarist for Presley between 1954 and 1968.

Rock critic Dave Marsh credits Moore with inventing power chords, on the 1957 Elvis hit "Jailhouse Rock". Moore was ranked 29th in Rolling Stone magazine's list of 100 Greatest Guitarists of All Time in 2011. He was inducted into the Rock and Roll Hall of Fame in 2000, the Musicians Hall of Fame and Museum in 2007, and the Memphis Music Hall of Fame in 2015. The Rolling Stones' guitarist Keith Richards said of Moore:

When I heard "Heartbreak Hotel", I knew what I wanted to do in life. It was as plain as day. All I wanted to do in the world was to be able to play and sound like the way Scotty Moore did. Everyone wanted to be Elvis, I wanted to be Scotty.

== Biography ==
=== Early years ===
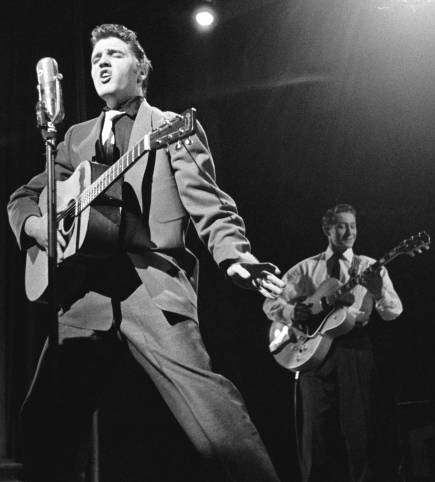
Moore (right) performing with Elvis Presley (left) in 1956

Winfield Scott Moore III was born near Gadsden, Tennessee, to Mattie (nee Hefley) and Winfield Scott Moore II, as the youngest of four boys by 14 years. He learned to play the guitar from family and friends at age eight. Although underage when he enlisted, Moore served in the United States Navy in China and Korea from 1948 through January 1952.

=== 1950s-early 1960s ===
Moore's early background was in jazz and country music. A fan of the guitarist Chet Atkins, Moore led a group called the Starlite Wranglers before Sam Phillips at Sun Records put him together with then-teenage Elvis Presley. The trio was completed with double bass player Bill Black, who brought a "rhythmic propulsion" that much pleased Phillips. In 1954, Moore and Black accompanied Elvis on what would become the first Presley hit, the Sun Studios session cut of "That's All Right", a recording regarded as a seminal event in rock and roll history.

This session, held on the evening of July 5, 1954, proved entirely unfruitful until late in the night. As they were about to give up and go home, Presley took his guitar and launched into a 1946 blues number, Arthur Crudup's "That's All Right". Moore recalled,

All of a sudden, Elvis just started singing this song, jumping around and acting the fool and then Bill picked up his bass and he started acting the fool too, and I started playing with them. Sam, I think, had the door to the control booth open...he stuck his head out and said, "What are you doing?" And we said, "We don't know." "Well, back up," he said, "try to find a place to start and do it again." Phillips quickly began taping as this was the sound he had been looking for.

The trio soon recorded a bluegrass number, Bill Monroe's "Blue Moon of Kentucky", again in a distinctive style and employing an echo effect that Sam Phillips called "slapback". A single was pressed with "That's All Right" on the A side and "Blue Moon of Kentucky" as the B-side.

Phillips' rhythm-centered vision led him to steer Moore away from Chet Atkins' style, the one which had been adopted by Merle Travis's finger-picking style, now dubbed as "travis picking", which he deemed fine for pop or country but not for the simple, gutsy sound Phillips was aiming at. Simplify was the keyword.

By his performance at the Louisiana Hayride in October 1954, Presley, Black and Moore were called the Blue Moon Boys. For a time, Moore served as Presley's personal manager. They were later joined by the drummer D.J. Fontana.

Beginning in July 1954, the Blue Moon Boys toured and recorded throughout the American South. Subsequently, Elvis's popularity rose amongst teenage girls, they began touring nationwide, appearing on distinguished programs such as The Ed Sullivan Show, which, at the time, was the hallmark for success for young artists. On April 3, 1956, they performed "Shake, Rattle and Roll," "Heartbreak Hotel," and "Blue Suede Shoes" on The Milton Berle Show. Elvis and the band appeared on The Steve Allen Show in a comedy sketch performing "Hound Dog" to an actual hound dog. Presley was prohibited from doing the gyrations that elicited screams from the audience, which would produce good reviews, but those were nothing compared to the scandals Elvis and the band would face. Elvis never understood why the girls screamed out of control when he sang. It was Moore who told him why. "It's your leg, man. The way you shake your left leg."

Moore played on many of Presley's most famous recordings, including "That's All Right," "Good Rockin' Tonight," "Milkcow Blues Boogie," "Baby Let's Play House" (where Elvis introduced the vocal stutter to the music pundits), "Heartbreak Hotel," "Mystery Train," "Blue Suede Shoes," "Hound Dog," "Too Much," ""Jailhouse Rock," and "Hard Headed Woman." He called his solo on "Hound Dog" "ancient psychedelia."

During the filming and recording of Loving You in Hollywood in early 1957, Moore and Black drove boredom away by jamming with Presley between takes but they usually saw little of Presley, although he stayed only a couple of floors away from them. They grew hurt and resentful at the separation, which they came to perceive as willfully organized.

They did not accompany Presley on the soundtrack recordings for his first movie, Love Me Tender, because 20th Century Fox had refused to allow him to use his own band, with the excuse that the band could not play country. By December 1956, they were experiencing financial difficulties because there had been few performances since August. When there were performances, they received $200 a week (US$2,368 in 2025 dollars), but only $100 (US$1,184 in 2025 dollars) when they were not performing. Moore and his wife were forced to move in with her three sisters and brother-in-law. In an interview with the Memphis Press-Scimitar that December, they spoke about their lack of performances and contact with Presley himself. The interview was the vehicle for their announcement that management had given them permission to record an instrumental album of their own, which RCA Victor would release, permission which was needed in order for them to appear as a group without Presley.

During Presley's 1957 tour of Canada, the concert promoter Oscar Davis offered to represent them as their manager. Moore and Black, who had seen Presley become a millionaire while they were still earning $200 or $100 a week themselves, were willing to work with Davis but the backing vocalists, the Jordanaires, were not amenable, because they did not trust Davis. They had usually been living off $100 a week since 1956, as had Elvis; however, once Hollywood had been introduced, Presley's salary experienced a dramatic rise, while Moore and Black continued at $100 a week. They only received one raise in two years and with the lack of personal appearances it was getting to be too financially difficult.

Tension hit a breaking point right after the September 1957 sessions for Presley's first Christmas album. Moore and Black had been promised an opportunity to jam with Elvis after the session, on Presley's studio time. Yet when the session was over, they were told to pack up and leave. That same evening, the duo wrote a letter of resignation. They deduced (correctly) the Colonel was working against them. They had been denied virtually all access to Presley and felt as if "they were no longer even permitted to talk to him". Colonel Parker didn't interfere but RCA Victor executive Steve Sholes, who had little regard for the ability of Presley's band, hoped the separation would be permanent. Back in Memphis, a journalist found out about the split and interviewed the duo. Presley responded to the article with a press statement wishing them good luck, saying things could have been worked out if they had come to him first instead of bringing it to the press. In an accompanying interview, Presley revealed that during the previous two years, people had tried to convince him to get rid of his band so from his point of view he had stayed loyal to them.

Presley was scheduled to appear in Tupelo within the next two weeks and started to audition new musicians. He performed with Hank Garland on guitar and D.J. Fontana's friend, Chuck Wiginton, on bass, but despite their musical ability, it didn't feel the same to him. The week after his Tupelo engagement he hired back Moore and Black on a per diem basis. In the meantime, the duo had played "a miserable two-week engagement at the Dallas State Fair." Moore declared there were no hard feelings, though Presley himself, according to biographer Guralnick, seems to have taken a more melancholic view. One day, Guralnick writes, Presley heard "Jailhouse Rock" on the radio "and declared, 'Elvis Presley and his one-man-band,' with a rueful shake of his head."

Moore and the Blue Moon Boys performed (and had additional small walk-on and speaking roles) with Presley in four of his movies (Loving You, Jailhouse Rock, King Creole, and G.I. Blues) filmed in 1957, 1958, and 1960.

In 1958, after Presley was drafted, Moore purchased part of local Memphis record label Fernwood Records and produced a hit record, "Tragedy," for Thomas Wayne Perkins, the brother of Johnny Cash's guitarist Luther Perkins. The song also featured Moore doubling on guitar, with Black playing bass. Moore also released an instrumental, "Have Guitar Will Travel", as a solo single on Fernwood, featuring Black on bass and Joe Lee on saxophone. Moore later sold his portion of Fernwood by summer 1960.

In 1960, Moore resumed working with Presley in the studio and became the "production manager at Sam Phillips Recording Service, which involved supervising all aspects of studio operation." Moore played on such Presley songs as "Fame and Fortune," "Such a Night," "Frankfort Special," "Surrender," "I Feel So Bad," "Rock-A-Hula Baby", "Kiss Me Quick," "Good Luck Charm," "She's Not You", "(You're the) Devil in Disguise", and "Bossa Nova Baby." Moore remained as a guitarist for the majority of the songs recorded after Presley's work was dominated by Hollywood sessions. Moore mostly played rhythm guitar, however, with his last lead guitar work occurring by 1962. Moore also played on sessions for Roy Orbison (most notably on “Crying”) and others.

=== Mid-1960s-1980s ===
Moore pivoted to working primarily as an engineer in the 1960s and 1970s, first at Sam Phillips Recording Service and then later at Music City Recorders.

In 1964, Moore released a solo album on Epic Records called The Guitar That Changed the World, played using his Gibson Super 400. Phillips was initially unaware of the project, and once he got wind of it, Moore was fired. That year, he also moved to Nashville where he launched the studio Music City Recorders and his own record label, Belle Meade Records.

In 1968, Moore, Fontana, and Presley performed for Presley's NBC television special known as the '68 Comeback Special, again with his Gibson Super 400, which was also played by Presley. This special was the last time these musicians would play with Presley, and for Moore, it was the last time he ever saw him.

In 1970, Moore engineered Ringo Starr's solo album Beaucoups of Blues. In 1973, he sold Music City Recorders and primarily began working as a freelance engineer.

In 1975, he (and Fontana) reunited to record "E.P. Express" with friend Carl Perkins. In 1976, he bought Monument Studios and used the building to house his tape-duplication business called Independent Producers Corporation, while also still doing some freelance engineering work. In the late 1970s and early 1980, he served as an engineer for Opryland Productions for television specials. Some musicians and other performers he worked with during his time with Opryland included former Sun labelmate Johnny Cash, Jerry Lee Lewis, Dolly Parton, Minnie Pearl, Perry Como, Ann-Margret, Bob Hope, Carol Burnett, and Joey Heatherton.

In 1989, he served as a consultant for the ABC series titled Elvis, focusing on the early years.

=== 1990s-2009 ===
In 1992, he collaborated with Carl Perkins on the album 706 ReUnion: A Sentimental Journey, which was released on Moore's label, Belle Meade Records. In August 1992, he made his first live performance since 1968, performing with Carl Perkins at Ellis Auditorium for a "Good Rockin' Tonight" show alongside Fontana, the Jordanaires, James Burton, the Sun Rhythm Section, and Ronnie McDowell. They later took this show format on a small tour of England.

In 1993, Moore, Fontana, and Carl Perkins performed at a telethon in Jackson, TN. Later that year, semi-retired Moore met and recorded with Lee Rocker (of the Stray Cats), Rocker's guitarist Mike Eldred, and their band Big Blue for their first album. Moore and Fontana also toured Europe with vocalist Bloomer Jenson, organized by the Elvis Presley fan club "It's Elvis Time". In 1994, Moore, Fontana, and Carl Perkins performed at the Jackson telethon again and were joined by McDowell.

In 1997, Moore and Fontana reunited to record the album All the King's Men, featuring guest appearances from the Bill Black Combo, Keith Richards and Ronnie Wood of The Rolling Stones, Jeff Beck, Levon Helm and Jim Weider of The Band, Rick Neilsen of Cheap Trick, and others. In April 1999, Moore and Fontana toured the UK.

In 2001, Moore and Fontana recorded a version of "That's All Right" with Paul McCartney for the documentary Good Rockin' Tonight: The Legacy of Sun Records.

== Style and influence ==
Moore's playing on his Gibson with his unique finger-picking style using a thumbpick, as on the Sun and early RCA Victor recordings, represented a move of the Chet Atkins style into a more rockabilly mode.

Of Presley's first single "That's All Right," the critic Dave Marsh wrote that "Moore's guitar—especially the solo—toughens the song up and forces it to rock." Though Marsh credits Presley with introducing "the vocal stutter" on "Baby Let's Play House," Marsh states, "Other than that, it's guitarist Scotty Moore's show and he sets a few precedents of his own." Of the other Sun recordings, Marsh cited the "urgent Scotty Moore guitar lick" as a standout element of "Mystery Train," while "Good Rockin' Tonight" displays his "stinging guitar."

In Marsh's description, the teamwork of Moore and other musicians turned the 1957 single and movie title song "Jailhouse Rock" into an "enduring smash for at least three reasons: the great walking bass, Scotty Moore's invention of power chording, and D.J. Fontana's drumming, which is halfway between strip joint rhumba and the perfect New Orleans shuffle."

On the 1961, post-Army Presley single "Little Sister," "Scotty Moore comes up with his greatest post-Sun guitar lick and not only converts a comparatively humdrum Pomus-Shuman teen love triangle number into the best of Elvis's early sixties hits but (together with D.J. Fontana's heavy-footed thunderation) gives more than a few pointers toward the metallic rock to come." According to Presley discographer Ernst Jørgensen, however, Hank Garland was the lead guitarist on the song, while Moore played acoustic guitar.

Moore is given credit as a pioneer rock 'n' roll lead guitarist, though he characteristically downplayed his own innovative role in the development of the style. "It had been there for quite a while," recalled Moore. "Carl Perkins was doing basically the same sort of thing up around Jackson and I know for a fact Jerry Lee Lewis had been playing that kind of music ever since he was ten years old." Paul Friedlander describes the defining elements of rockabilly, which he similarly characterizes as "essentially... an Elvis Presley construction:" "the raw, emotive, and slurred vocal style and emphasis on rhythmic feeling [of] the blues with the string band and strummed rhythm guitar [of] country." In "That's All Right," the Presley trio's first record, Moore's guitar solo, "a combination of Merle Travis–style country finger-picking, double-stop slides from acoustic boogie and blues-based bent-note, single-string work, is a microcosm of this fusion."

Although some lead guitarists and vocalists, such as Chuck Berry and the blues legend B. B. King, had gained popularity by the 1950s, Presley rarely played his own lead while performing, instead providing rhythm guitar and leaving the lead duties to Moore. As a guitarist, Moore was a noticeable presence in Presley's performances despite his introverted demeanor. He became an inspiration to many subsequent popular guitarists, including George Harrison, Jeff Beck, and Keith Richards of the Rolling Stones. While Moore was working on his memoir with co-author James L. Dickerson, Richards told Dickerson, "Everyone else wanted to be Elvis—I wanted to be Scotty." Richards has stated many times (in Rolling Stone magazine and in his autobiography, Life) that he could never figure out how to play the "stop time" break and figure that Moore played on "I'm Left, You're Right, She's Gone" (Sun) and that he hopes it will remain a mystery.

=== Equipment ===
Earlier on, Scotty used a '52 Telecaster, which he traded at the Houck Piano Company in Memphis for the now-iconic gold-colored Gibson ES-295 (nicknamed "The Guitar That Changed the World"). He made some modifications to the guitar, mainly he was unhappy with the Les Paul style bridge, which he replaced with a Melita-Synchro Sonic model with adjustable saddles, which enabled fine-tuning of each string; but this bridge further required a different tailpiece—Scotty opted for a Kluson trapeze model as utilized by Gibson on the ES-125. This is the guitar heard on all but the later Sun sessions with Elvis. In July 1955, Scotty traded this guitar for a blonde-finish 1954 Gibson L-5 CESN, with which he recorded the last Sun sessions (including "Mystery Train"), as well as several RCA cuts, and in 1957 he switched to a Gibson Super 400. This Super 400 was the guitar heard on the Jailhouse Rock and King Creole soundtracks, as well as the earlier post-army sessions.

One of the key pieces of equipment in Moore's sound on many of the recordings with Presley, besides his guitars, was the Ray Butts EchoSonic, first used by Chet Atkins, a guitar amplifier with a tape echo built in, which allowed him to take his trademark slapback echo on the road. This amplifier was not used until 1955—which means that the earlier Sun sessions (including That's All Right Mama) were not recorded with this amplifier.

== Personal life ==
=== Last years and death ===
Moore had to give up playing guitar about ten years before his death because of arthritis. Quite likely his last appearance on a recording came as a guest on the 2011 album 61 & 49 by the Mike Eldred Trio. That group's leader, guitarist Mike Eldred, had been a friend of Moore's since the early 1990s.

Moore died on June 28, 2016, in Nashville, Tennessee, at the age of 84.

== Songwriting ==
Scotty Moore co-wrote the songs "My Kind of Carrying On" and "Now She Cares No More" which were released as Sun 202 on Sun Records in 1954 when he was a member of the group Doug Poindexter and the Starlite Wranglers with Bill Black as the double bass player. He co-wrote the instrumental "Have Guitar Will Travel" in 1958 with Bill Black, which was released as a 45 single, 107, on the Fernwood Records label.

== Awards ==
For his pioneering contribution, Moore has been recognized by the Rockabilly Hall of Fame. In 2000, he was inducted into the Rock and Roll Hall of Fame.

== Bibliography ==
- Moore, Scotty; Dickerson, James L. (1997). That's Alright, Elvis: The Untold Story of Elvis's First Guitarist and Manager, Scotty Moore. Schirmer Books. ISBN 978-0028645995.
- Moore, Scotty; Dickerson, James L. (2013). Scotty and Elvis: Aboard the Mystery Train. University Press of Mississippi. ISBN 978-1617038181.
