= Seedy (album) =

Compilation album by Operation Ivy
- Released: 1996
- Recorded: 1987–1988
- Genre: Hardcore punk, ska punk
- Label: Karma Kredit

Seedy is a compilation album by the American ska punk band Operation Ivy. The album was released in 1996 through Karma Kredit Records. Karma Kredit was a pseudonym for David Hayes' Very Small Records. The compilation collects studio outtakes, live tracks, and demo recordings.

== Track listing ==
1. "Healthy Body" (Uncut Version)
2. "Someday"
3. "Plea for Peace"
4. "Trouble Bound"
5. "Uncertain"
6. "Hangin' Out"
7. "Left Behind"
8. "Old Friendships"
9. "Hedgecore"
10. "Steppin' Out"
11. "The End" (outro)

== Personnel ==
- Jesse Michaels - lead vocals
- Lint - guitar, backing vocals
- Matt McCall - bass, backing vocals
- Dave Mello - drums

== Notes ==
- Intro recorded in Manhattan
- Tracks 1–3 recorded November 27, 1987. Rough Mixes from "Hectic" Session.
- Tracks 4–7 and 10 recorded August 24, 1987. Gilman Demo
- Track 8 recorded March 17, 1988. Live on FM 88.7 KSPC Radio Station in Claremont, CA.
- Track 9 recorded April 21, 1988. Live on WFMU Radio Station
- Track 11 recorded in Kansas
