= Gibson Super 400 =

Archtop guitar made by Gibson

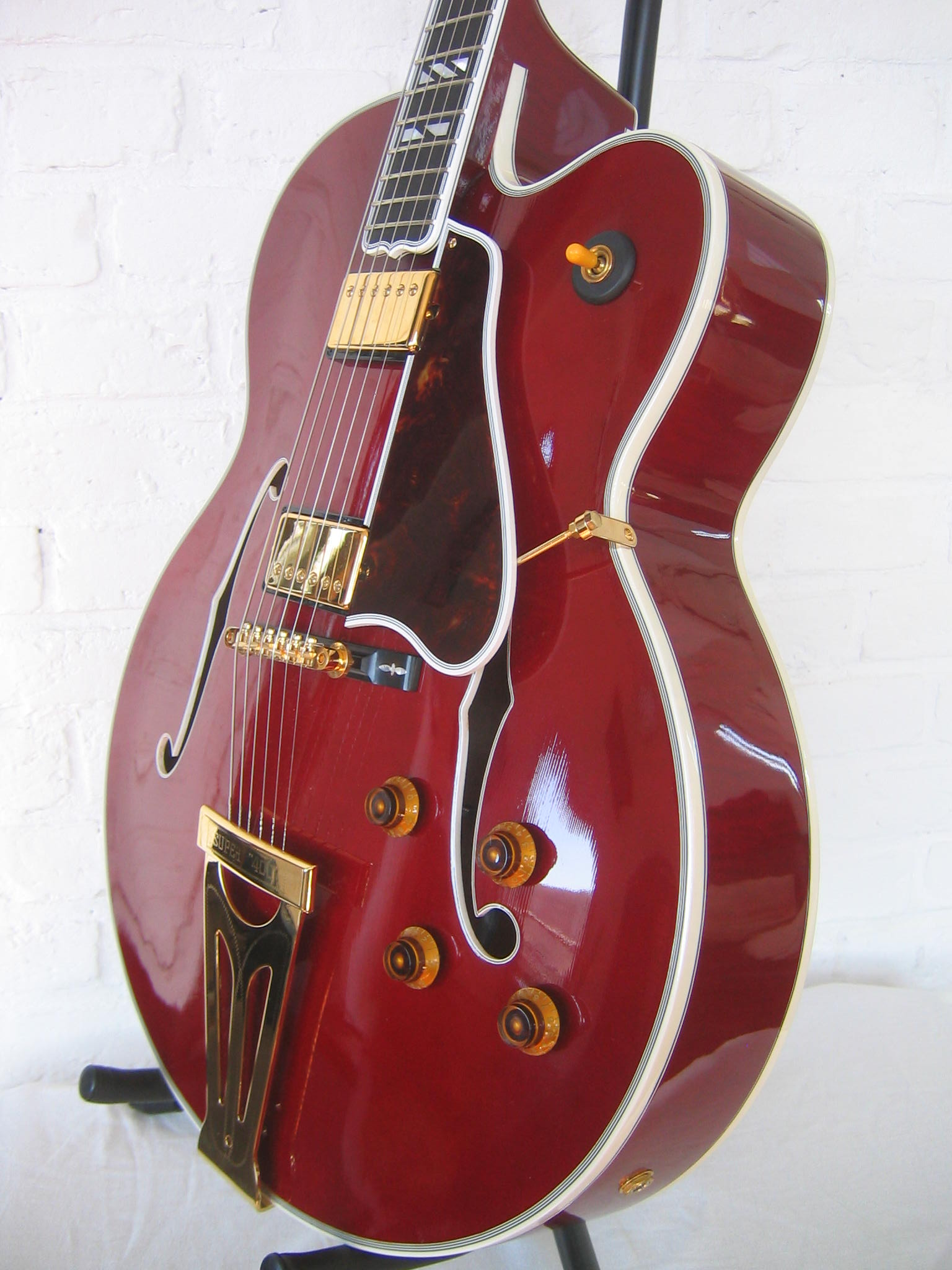
- A Super 400 in Red Wine
- Manufacturer: Gibson
- Period: 1934–present

Construction
- Body type: Solid wood hollowbody/archtop w/parallel top bracing, acoustic/electric guitar
- Neck joint: Dovetail joint/glued-in, 5-piece
- Scale: 25.5"

Woods
- Body: Maple sides and back, spruce top
- Neck: 5 piece/maple-walnut-maple-walnut-maple
- Fretboard: Ebony

Hardware
- Bridge: Gold ABR-1 bridge on floating ebony base; tailpiece is engraved gold-plated nickel
- Pickup: Optional P90 or humbucker/2015 model standard is a set of "57 Classics"

Colors available
- Various

The Gibson Super 400 is an archtop guitar. It is a highly influential guitar model that inspired many other master guitar builders (including Elmer Stromberg and John D'Angelico). It was first sold in 1934 and named for its $400 price (equivalent to $9,627 in 2025), like many Gibson guitars of that era.

The Super 400 features solid carved-wood construction, and at the time of its introduction was the largest guitar that the Gibson Guitar Corporation had produced. Until 1939, it had a hand-engraved tailpiece and a hand-engraved finger rest support. During the very early production stock the truss rod cover had engraved "L5 Super"; on later guitars this was changed to "Super 400".

In 1939 the guitar was changed. The upper bout was enlarged, and the hand-engraved tailpiece was replaced with the one still fitted today on current Super 400s. The f-holes were slightly enlarged and a cutaway option also became available. This was called the Super 400P (for Premiere), later changed to C for Cutaway.

During the 1950s, Gibson released the Super 400 CES (Cutaway•Electric•Spanish). This had a slightly thicker top to reduce feedback, two P-90 pickups, and individual tone and volume controls, along with a three-way toggle switch. Later, the P-90 pickups were replaced with Alnico V pickups, then in 1957, humbucking pickups.

There have been variations in the limited edition custom models. In 2000 Gibson offered the Super 400 with a Charlie Christian pickup. The Super 400 is still available today, with two humbucker pickups. The full acoustic version is no longer available.

The 1963 Gibson Super 400 CES Florentine model belonging to Scotty Moore played an important role in Elvis Presley's stage performance, the '68 Comeback Special.

== Notable users ==
- Elvis Presley
- Kenny Burrell
- Larry Coryell
- Robben Ford
- Bill Haley
- Scotty Moore
- Keith Richards
- Brian Setzer
- Merle Travis
- Charles Anton Lees
- Stephen Stills

== See also ==
- Gibson Guitar Corporation product list
