= Ray Campi =

American rock musician (1934–2021)

- Born: Raymond Charles Campi; April 20, 1934; New York City, U.S.
- Died: March 11, 2021 (aged 86) Los Angeles, California
- Genres: Rockabilly; country; rock and roll
- Occupations: Singer, musician
- Instruments: Double bass, Vocals, Guitar, Mandolin, Dobro, Steel Guitar

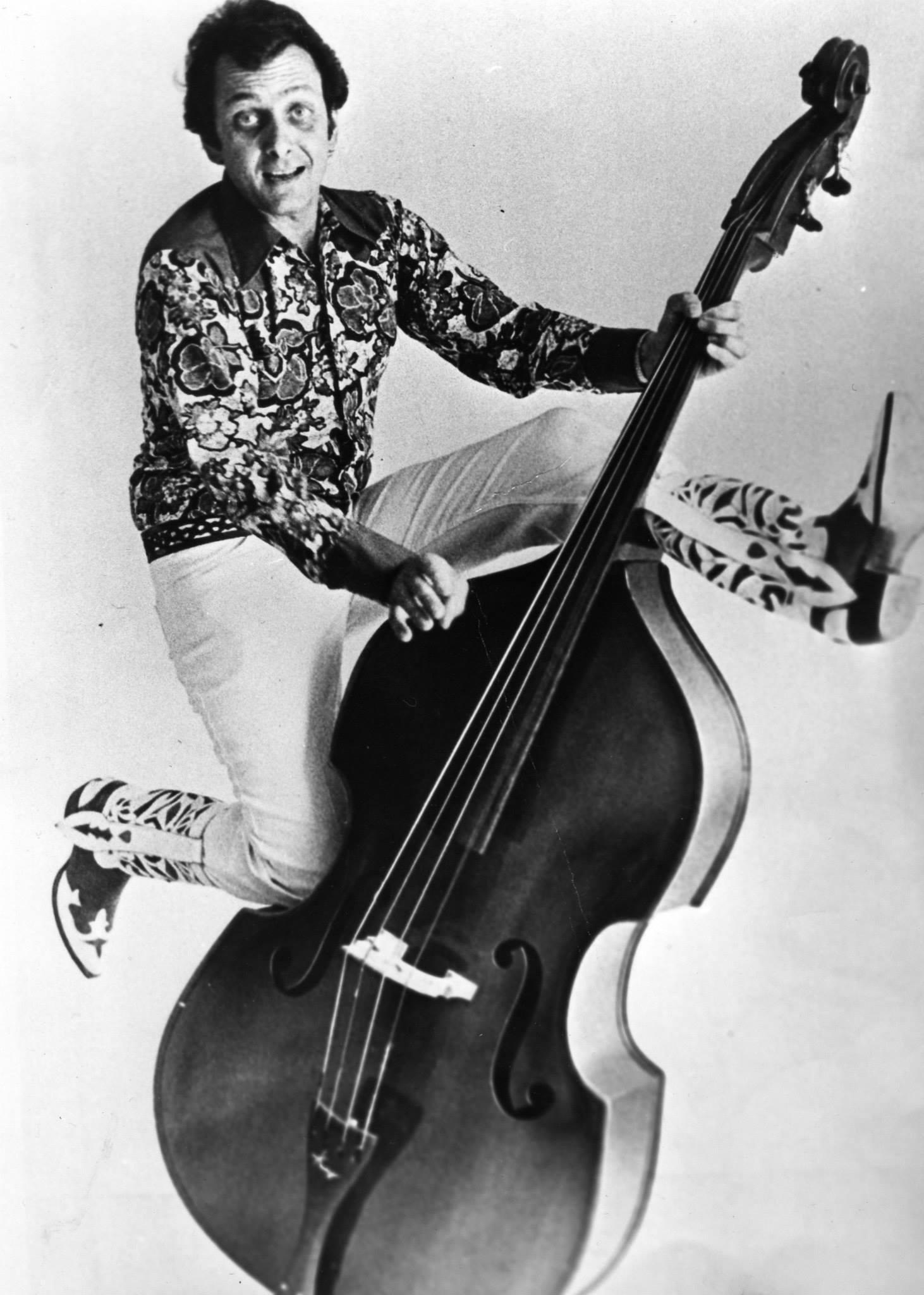
Ray promo shot in the 70's

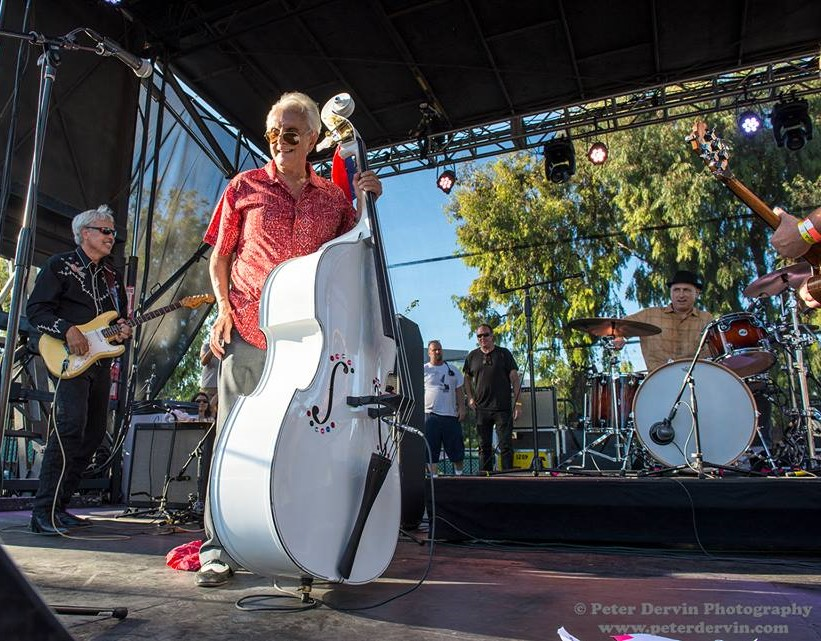
Ray performing at the Make The Music Go Bang festival in Orange County, California. September 2014. Photo by Peter Dervin

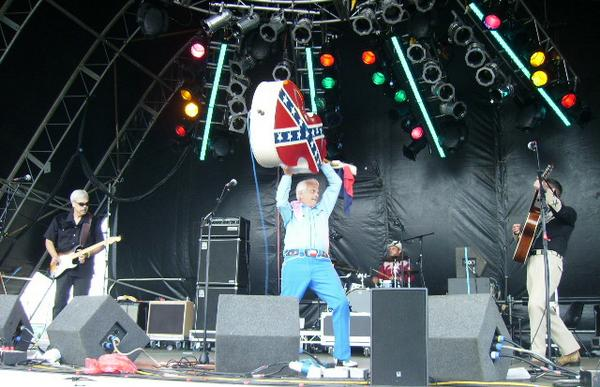
Onstage at The Americana International Festival, Newark, England. July 2008.

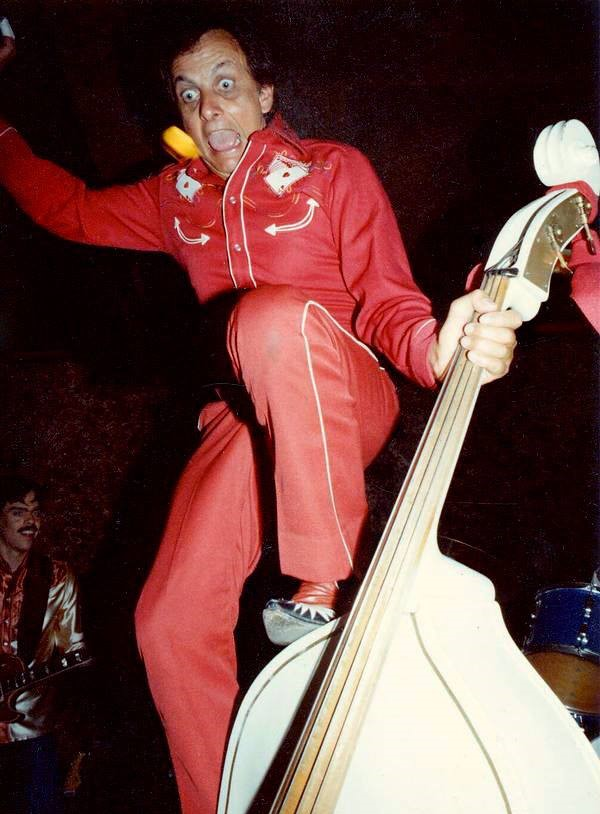
Ray onstage in the mid-80's. Glendale, California.

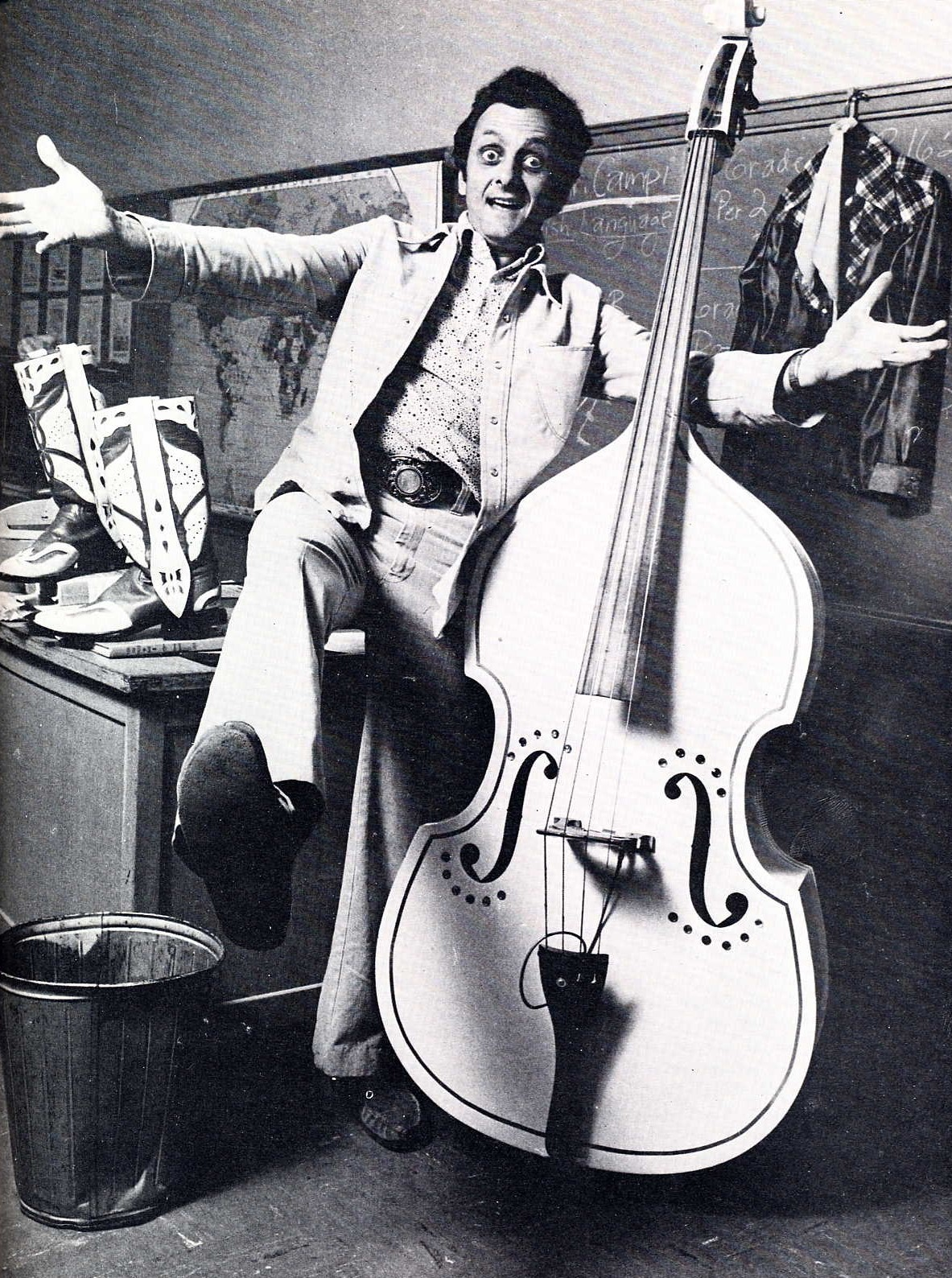
Ray in his classroom for a story in New West magazine. 1980. Los Angeles, California

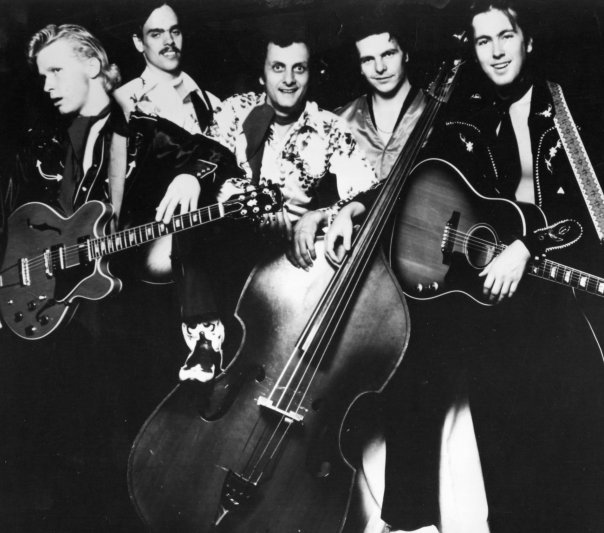
Ray Campi And His Rockabilly Rebels promo shot, Hollywood, California. 1978. Photo by Jeffrey Scales.

Raymond Charles Campi (April 20, 1934 – March 11, 2021) was an American singer, musician and songwriter, nicknamed "The Rockabilly Rebel". He first recorded in the mid-1950s. Campi's trademark was his white double bass, which he often jumped on top of and "rode" while playing. He was a member of the Rockabilly Hall of Fame.

== Biography ==
Campi was born in New York City in April 1934 and lived in Yonkers, New York during his very earliest years. After his family moved to Austin, Texas in 1944, Ray began a lifetime of performing and recording music in numerous genres, including Rockabilly, Folk, Blues, Western Swing, Country, and Rock And Roll.

In the 1950s, Ray recorded for Domino Records. and other labels, including Dot Records. He cut the first tribute record to the 1959 Buddy Holly plane crash, "The Ballad of Donna and Peggy Sue," backed by the Big Bopper's band. Ray also worked with a diverse range of singers, including Ian Whitcomb, and Mae West, who recorded his song "Caterpillar".

He rarely concentrated on his musical career exclusively, working a wide variety of jobs. From 1967 on, he was a junior high school teacher. He fiercely criticized the mainstream music industry, in particular its connections with drug culture.

His musical career took off in the early 1970s when he was tracked down by Ronny Weiser, the owner of Rollin' Rock Records. Ronny owned some of Campi's 50's singles and had heard he was a teacher living in the San Fernando Valley, so he looked Ray up in the phone book. Soon after, Weiser purchased a double bass for him. Previously, Campi had been accustomed to playing the electric guitar, but after four days of practice they recorded "Pan American Boogie" in Weiser's bedroom.

Starting in 1977, Campi began touring Great Britain and Europe, playing clubs and festivals there and gigging regularly at home in California, while keeping his teaching job. He also recorded with American, German, Finnish, British and Dutch Rockabilly bands, and produced his own albums with artists such as Rosie Flores, Bobby 'Fats' Mizell, and Ian Whitcomb. Ray performed on several solo albums by Kevin Fennell, his lead guitarist from 1977 to 2015. He also performed and recorded with longtime musical associate Rip Masters.

Campi died in his sleep at home on March 11, 2021 at age 86 of natural causes.

== Early discography ==
Many of Ray Campi's earliest 1950s recordings were not issued until the 1980s and 1990s, mostly on European albums. But the following were issued on 45-rpm and, in some cases, 78-rpm. "Caterpillar" was considered his most popular record until his revival in the 1970s.

- TNT 145 "Caterpillar"/"Play It Cool" 1956
- Dot 15617 "It Ain't Me"/"Give That Love to Me" 1957
- Domino 700 "My Screamin' Screamin' Mimi"/"Uh Huh Huh" 1958
- Domino 701 "You Gambled"/"No Time" 1958
- D-104 "Ballad of Donna and Peggy Sue"/"The Man I Met (Tribute to the Big Bopper)" 1959
- Verve 10208 "Our Man in Havana"/"Reprieve of Love" 1960
- Colpix 166 "Cry For Happy"/"Hear What I Wanna Hear" 1960
