= Common Ground: Dave & Phil Alvin Play and Sing the Songs of Big Bill Broonzy =

Studio album by Dave Alvin, Phil Alvin
- Released: June 3, 2014
- Recorded: December, 2013 – January, 2014
- Genre: Folk rock, country rock, blues
- Length: 42:38
- Label: Yep Roc
- Producer: Dave Alvin

Dave Alvin, Phil Alvin chronology
Eleven Eleven (2011)	Common Ground: Dave & Phil Alvin Play and Sing the Songs of Big Bill Broonzy (2014)	Lost Time (2015)

Common Ground: Dave & Phil Alvin Play and Sing the Songs of Big Bill Broonzy is a studio album by rock musicians Dave and Phil Alvin, released in 2014. The album is a tribute to the songs of Big Bill Broonzy; the brothers credit him with writing the first rockabilly song.

The album peaked at No. 144 on the Billboard 200. It was nominated for a Grammy, in the "Best Blues Album" category.

== Reception ==
Professional ratings
Aggregate scores
Source	Rating
Metacritic	81/100
Review scores
Source	Rating
AllMusic	4/5 stars
Blurt	3/5 stars
Classic Rock	4/5 stars
Mojo	3/5 stars
Q	4/5 stars
Record Collector	4/5 stars
Uncut	4.5/5 stars

AllMusic critic Mark Deming wrote: "While listening to this is a potent reminder of how good Broonzy's songs still sound in the 21st century, it also demonstrates the complementary talents of Dave and Phil Alvin... It's clear the Alvins love this music and know how to mess with it in just the right way, and they don't treat Broonzy's tales of all manner of wild living like museum pieces, but as vital, living bits of American music, and that's how they sound on this album." The New Yorker wrote that "the Alvins have picked a dozen songs that reflect the wide range of Broonzy’s material, from early highlights, like 'Saturday Night Rub', to mature classics, like 'Key to the Highway'. Both brothers sing and play guitar, and both shine."

== Track listing ==
All songs by Big Bill Broonzy unless otherwise noted.

1. "All by Myself" – 3:28
2. "I Feel So Good" – 4:09
3. "How Do You Want It Done?" – 3:00
4. "Southern Flood Blues" – 4:29
5. "Big Bill Blues" – 3:19
6. "Key to the Highway" (William Broonzy, Charlie Segar) – 3:48
7. "Tomorrow" – 3:21
8. "Just a Dream" – 3:52
9. "You've Changed" – 3:12
10. "Stuff They Call Money" – 4:44
11. "Truckin' Little Woman" – 3:08
12. "Saturday Night Rub" – 2:08

== Personnel ==
- Dave Alvin – vocals, guitar, National Steel guitar
- Phil Alvin – vocals, guitar, harmonica
- Bob Glaub – bass
- Brad Fordham – bass, acoustic bass
- Don Heffington – drums
- Lisa Pankratz – drums
- Gene Taylor – piano

Production

- Dave Alvin – producer, liner notes
- Craig Parker Adams – engineer, mixing, producer
- Joe Gastwirt – mastering
- Michael Triplett – design
- Harry Sabin – photo assistance
- Cass Alvin – cover photo
- Beth Herzhaft – photography
