= John Bazz =

American bassist

John Bazz (born July 6, 1952) is an American bass guitarist known for his long service in The Blasters. Bazz's credits also include work with various other notable musicians, including Charlie Musselwhite, Marc Ford, Mike Eldred, Top Jimmy, Ryan Bingham, and Lynwood Slim.

== Early life ==
Bazz grew up in Downey, California. He was one of four children. His father, Jack, was born in Wyoming in 1923. The 1940 census shows Jack living in Los Angeles. He lived in the L.A. area for the rest of his life.

The family name was originally Bazzanella. His grandfather, Giacomo, emigrated to the United States in 1905 and the surname was shortened.

Bazz's neighbors in Downey were his future bandmates in The Blasters: Phil Alvin, Dave Alvin, and Bill Bateman. In a 1985 interview, he remembered that his family lived across the street from the Alvins, and that their mothers were friends before any of the boys were born. He said that in a sense, they were all brothers.

== Career ==
=== With the Blasters ===
In Make the Music Go Bang! (1997), Los Angeles music journalist Chris Morris described The Blasters circa 1980 and the "brute energy" that the band generated, including "the pump of bassist John Bazz." Dave Alvin echoed Morris in another history of the L.A. punk scene, Under the Big Black Sun. Pointing to their mutual education in old American music of all kinds, he noted how "John Bazz pumping decades-old walking bass lines like they were brand new" contributed to the band's "undeniably manic, energetic magic." A 2018 review of the band found that "[t]he hard-hitting rhythm section of drummer Bill Bateman and bassist John Bazz is propulsive and relentless.”

Alongside frontman Phil Alvin, Bazz has been one of the two enduring members in the various lineups of The Blasters over their more than 40-year history. As of 2022, he continued to be part of the rhythm section, alongside Bill Bateman.

=== Style and professional reputation ===
Bazz plays upright bass in addition to electric bass. One description called his approach "unwavering and relentless" and remarked on the "passion" and "unmistakable push" in his playing that prompts high demand for his services in sessions and gigs.

One such assignment from a high-profile frontman came in 2002–03, when actor Bruce Willis handpicked Bazz to be in one of his musical side ventures, the Accelerators. Willis and band played for American troops in Iraq in September 2003 as part of the USO's "Touch of Home" tour.

John Doe—an old friend, contemporary, and fellow bass player—put it like this in early 2020: "Every time I see [Bazz] play, I want to be him. He simply gets it." Echoing Dave Alvin, Doe added, "He finds new ways to say something in rock ’n’ roll or roots music that may have already been said."

=== Membership in other bands / musicianship ===
Starting around 2000, Bazz has also been a member of the Mike Eldred Trio, another roots-rock band. This group, led by guitarist Mike Eldred, became more active from 2010 on. A 2017 interview with Eldred noted the solid credibility that came from having Bazz and drummer Brian Fahey in the band; Eldred likened it to driving a Cadillac.

Bazz also played with the Gene Taylor Blues Band, featuring pianist Gene Taylor, a member of the Blasters in the early '80s. That group released a live album called Live!!! 605 Boogie!!! in 2008. The lineup also featured Dave Alvin and Bill Bateman, prompting the San Diego Union-Tribune to ask ahead of a 2010 gig, "When is a performance by three co-founders of The Blasters, plus one longtime member, not a performance by The Blasters?"

When veteran bluesman Charlie Musselwhite released The Well in 2010, Rolling Stone commented that Musselwhite and his tight band—which included Bazz—set the standard for blues bands everywhere. Musselwhite's label, Alligator Records, remarked on the near-telepathic musicianship.

Bazz has also been part of Marc Ford's backing band, both recording and touring, in Ford's Neptune Blues Club project. It started in 2008, with the Marc Ford and the Neptune Blues Club self-titled album. In 2016, Ford commented, "There are a lot of years between the four of us playing music, and it’s real rich."
