= The Epic Masters =

Compilation album by Shakin' Stevens
- Released: 16 November 2009
- Recorded: 1978–1992
- Genres: Rock and roll, pop, rockabilly
- Label: Sony Music
- Producer: Various

Shakin' Stevens chronology
Now Listen (2007)	The Epic Masters (2009)

The Epic Masters is a box set compilation comprising ten remastered albums by Shakin' Stevens. Released on 16 November 2009, the set contains nine albums originally released by Epic Records between 1980 and 1990, plus an exclusive CD of 12" extended mixes. The set was also made available as a download through iTunes.

== Background ==
Although one of the most popular acts of the 1980s, Shakin' Stevens' major period of success came just before the emergence of the compact disc as a major format. Three of Stevens' albums, This Ole House (1981), Shaky (1981) and Give Me Your Heart Tonight (1982), had made the top 3 of the UK charts during 1981 and 1982 and, as a result, his 1983 release The Bop Won't Stop was one of the earliest of Epic's albums to be transferred to the CD format. However, despite producing three Top 5 hit singles, the album itself stalled at number 21 in the charts. In response to this relative failure, Epic ignored Shaky's next two album releases (one of which was his Greatest Hits album).

By the time of Stevens' next release - 1987's Let's Boogie - compact disc had become the dominant music format and, indeed, all of Stevens' subsequent studio albums were released on CD. However, the rise of the CD happened to coincide with a decline in the Welsh rocker's popularity and, apart from a few hits compilations and a very limited release of This Ole House (1981) in the early 1990s, many of Shaky's most popular recordings were to be denied a digital release for many years.

In 2003, Epic's parent company Sony BMG released a compromise three CD box set entitled Hits And More which contained most of the hits plus various selected album tracks. However, a resurgence in Stevens' popularity which began with him winning the 2005 ITV show Hit Me Baby One More Time resulted in the hits album The Collection reaching number 4 in the UK album charts. With Shaky's appearance at the 2008 Glastonbury Festival helping to confirm his popularity among those old enough to remember him the first time around, Sony finally relented and authorised, for the first time, the release of all of Shakin' Stevens' original albums on compact disc.

Marketed as a 30th anniversary celebration of Shaky's first hit single "Hot Dog", The Epic Masters contains 147 digitally remastered tracks (apparently overseen by Stevens himself) spread across ten compact discs. The set includes all of the albums Stevens recorded for Epic with the exception of the Merry Christmas Everyone album (which had already been available on a remastered CD since 2005) and represents the first appearance on compact disc in their entirety of the albums Take One! (1980), Shaky (1981), Give Me Your Heart Tonight and Lipstick, Powder and Paint. Each album is boosted by the addition of non-album b-sides and are housed in slip cases which reproduce the original vinyl releases. The package is completed by a bonus CD of selected 12" mixes plus a fully annotated booklet.

Apart from the Merry Christmas Everyone album, The Epic Masters contains virtually everything Shakin' Stevens released on Epic. Among the few omissions are the original single versions of "Hot Dog", "Blue Christmas" and the number one hit "Merry Christmas Everyone" (all previously available on several compilations). Also missing are most of the live recordings available on the B-sides of various singles. Of the extended mixes not included on The 12" CD, the most glaring omission would be the "Megamixofhits" compilation included on the "Teardrops" 12" which formed the basis of the "Hits Keep Coming" live medley from Let's Boogie. Finally, the digital remasters retained the noticeably different mixes of the number one hits "This Ole House", "Green Door" and "Oh Julie" which were included on the 2005 compilation The Collection.

== Remastering ==
It has been noted on Steve Hoffman's forum that several fans who have bought this set have been very disappointed in the remastering, as all the albums contain brickwall limiting. Results on the online dynamic range database range from DR1 to DR2, with many of the songs constantly clipping. Some fans hoped that Sony could redo this set again without the obnoxiously loud mastering, but consensus is that this will not happen.

== Track listing ==
Disc 1

=== Take One! (1980) ===
Erroneously dated in the box set as being released in October 1979, Take One! was not in fact released until February 1980, after the "Hot Dog" single had become Shaky's first UK hit single. Produced by Mike Hurst, the album contained a host of experienced session men, including lead guitarist Albert Lee, pianist Geraint Watkins, steel guitarist B.J. Cole and bassist and arranger Stuart Colman. In April 1982 the album was re-released under the new title of Hot Dog with "That's All Right" and "Ah, Poor Little Baby" being replaced by "You and I Were Meant to Be" and "Make It Right Tonight" respectively. The Epic Masters CD also contains Stevens' first three non-album singles recorded for Epic in 1978 and 1979. This is the first release on CD of the Take One! album.

1. "Lovestruck" (Ernie Barton)
2. "Hot Dog" (Buck Owens, Denny Dedmon)
3. "Is a Bluebird Blue?" (Dan Penn)
4. "That's All Right" (Gerald Nelson, Fred Burch)
5. "Without a Love" (Jimmy & Ronnie Isle)
6. "Shame Shame Shame" (Ruby Fisher, Ken Hopkins)
7. "Shotgun Boogie" (Tennessee Ernie Ford)
8. "I Got Burned" (Ral Donner)
9. "I Guess I Was a Fool" (Buddy Holly)
10. "Ah, Poor Little Baby" (Rex Koury, Falk)
11. "Little Pigeon" (Ray Whitt)
12. "Do What You Did" (Thurston Harris)

Bonus Tracks

13. "Apron Strings" (George David Weiss, Aaron Schroeder) (B-side of "Hot Dog")
14. "Treat Her Right" (Roy Head, Jean Kurtz) (Single)
15. "I Don't Want No Other Baby" (Dickie Bishop, Bob Watson) (B-side of "Treat Her Right" and "Spooky")
16. "Endless Sleep" (Jody Reynolds/Dolores Nance) (Single)
17. "Fire" (Bruce Springsteen) (B-side of "Endless Sleep")
18. "Spooky" (Buddy Buie, James Cobb, Harry Middlebrooks, Mike Shapiro) (Single)

Disc 2

=== This Ole House (1981) ===
The first of the hugely successful trio of Stuart Colman produced albums, This Ole House was originally released under the title of Marie Marie on 17 October 1980. However, the album initially failed to make the charts but was re-issued and re-titled on 27 March 1981 after the success of the "This Ole House" single and Stevens was rewarded with a number 2 position on the album charts. "This Ole House" replaced the song "Two Hearts Two Kisses" (listed on the Marie Marie album by simply "Two Hearts" at the time) from the original album which is now reinstated as a bonus track on The Epic Masters CD. The album retained most of the same musicians from the Take One! (1980) album, with the addition of ace Welsh guitarist (and ex-member of Shaky's previous backing group the Sunsets) Mickey Gee.

1. "Hey Mae" (Rusty & Doug Kershaw)
2. "Baby If We Touch" (Shakin' Stevens)
3. "Marie, Marie" (Dave Alvin)
4. "Lonely Blue Boy" (Ben Weisman, Fred Wise)
5. "Make It Right Tonight" (Shakin' Stevens)
6. "Move" (Peter Green, C. McNabb Jr.)
7. "Slippin' and Slidin'" (Richard Penniman, Eddie Bocage, Al (not Albert) Collins, James Smith)
8. "Shooting Gallery" (Brian Hodgson, Tony Colton)
9. "Revenue Man" (Donny Young)
10. "Make Me Know You're Mine" (Aaron Schroeder, David Hill)
11. "This Ole House" (Stuart Hamblen)
12. "Nobody" (Wayne Carson Thompson)

Bonus Track

13. "Two Hearts Two Kisses" (Henry Stone, Otis Williams) From "Marie Marie" LP

Disc 3

=== Shaky (1981) ===
Originally released on 4 September 1981 at the peak of Stevens' popularity, Shaky was his first (and to date only) number 1 album. Alongside three top 10 singles (the UK number 1 "Green Door", "You Drive Me Crazy" and "It's Raining") the album also contained five of Stevens' own compositions. When the album was released in Australia (with a slightly different track listing) it was re-titled Green Door and even received a CD release in the early 1990s. However, The Epic Masters marks the album's first release on CD in its original form. The bonus track "You and I Were Meant to Be" was also included on the Hot Dog album released in 1982.

1. "Mona Lisa" (Jay Livingston, Ray Evans)
2. "You Drive Me Crazy" (Ronnie Harwood)
3. "I'm Knockin'" (Shakin' Stevens)
4. "It's Raining" (Naomi Neville)
5. "Don't She Look Good" (Joey Spampinato)
6. "Green Door" (Bob Davie, Marvin Moore)
7. "Don't Bug Me Baby" (Luallen, Bragg)
8. "Don't Tell Me Your Troubles" (Don Gibson)
9. "I'm Gonna Sit Right Down and Write Myself a Letter" (Fred E. Ahlert, Joe Young)
10. "This Time" (Chips Moman)
11. "Baby You're a Child" (Shakin' Stevens)
12. "Don't Turn Your Back" (Shakin' Stevens)
13. "Let Me Show You How" (Shakin' Stevens)
14. "I'm Lookin'" (Shakin' Stevens)

Bonus Track

15. "You and I Were Meant to Be" (Shakin' Stevens) (B-side of "It's Raining")

Disc 4

=== Give Me Your Heart Tonight (1982) ===
The last of the Stuart Colman produced albums, 1982's Give Me Your Heart Tonight was Shaky's third top 3 album in two years. As well as the self-composed number 1 single "Oh Julie", the album also contained another three top 20 hits. Midway through the sessions, Stevens created a new studio band with the addition of The Rumour Brass, a four piece horn section, and only guitarist Roger McKew remaining from the previous three albums. Like the Shaky album, Give Me Your Heart Tonight was issued on compact disc with an altered track listing in Australia in the early 1990s. The Epic Masters however, gives the album its first CD release in its original form.

1. "Josephine" (Shakin' Stevens)
2. "Give Me Your Heart Tonight" (Billy Livsey)
3. "Sapphire" (Jack Hammer)
4. "Oh Julie" (Shakin' Stevens)
5. "I'll Be Satisfied" (Berry Gordy Jr., Tyran Carlo)
6. "Vanessa" (Billy Swan, Dennis Linde)
7. "Boppity Bop" (Shakin' Stevens)
8. "Don't Tell Me We're Through" (Shakin' Stevens)
9. "Shirley" (John Fred, Tommy Bryan)
10. "You Never Talked About Me" (Doc Pomus, Mort Shuman)
11. "Too Too Much" (Stuart Leathwood, Gary Sulsh)
12. "(Yeah) You're Evil" (Shakin' Stevens)
13. "Que Sera, Sera" (Jay Livingston, Ray Evans)

Bonus Tracks

14. "I'm for You" (Shakin' Stevens) (B-side of "Shirley")
15. "Thinkin' of You" (Shakin' Stevens) (B-side of "Give Me Your Heart Tonight")
16. "Don't Be Late (Miss Kate)" (Shakin' Stevens) (B-side of "I'll Be Satisfied")
17. "Lawdy Miss Clawdy (live)" (Lloyd Price) (from "Shakin' Stevens Special Edition EP")

Disc 5

=== The Bop Won't Stop (1983) ===
Produced mainly by Christopher Neil, The Bop Won't Stop signalled a move towards a more contemporary pop sound, highlighted by the top 3 single "Cry Just a Little Bit". Despite producing three other top 20 singles (two reaching the top 5), the album itself did not perform as well on the charts as Stevens' previous three albums. Nevertheless, The Bop Won't Stop became Shaky's first compact disc release in 1984. Among the bonus tracks included on The Epic Masters are "Your Ma Said You Cried in Your Sleep Last Night" which was released as a Europe-only single in 1983, and "A Letter To You", a top 10 single released ahead of 1984's Greatest Hits compilation.

1. "The Bop Won't Stop" (Steve Tatler)
2. "Why Do You Treat Me This Way?" (Shakin' Stevens)
3. "Diddle I" (Hogberg, Lawton)
4. "Don't Be Two Faced" (Tom Bee)
5. "Livin' Lovin' Wreck" (Otis Blackwell)
6. "A Rockin' Good Way (To Mess Around and Fall in Love)" (Brook Benton, Clyde Otis, Luchi DeJesus) Duet with Bonnie Tyler
7. "Brand New Man" (Mickey Gee)
8. "Cry Just a Little Bit" (Bob Heatlie)
9. "As Long As" (Steve Markwick, S. Stevens)
10. "A Love Worth Waiting For" (Gary Sulsh, Stuart Leathwood)
11. "Love Me Tonight" (Shakin' Stevens)
12. "It's Late" (Dorsey Burnette)

Bonus Tracks

13. "It's Good for You (Baby)" (Shakin' Stevens) (B-side of "It's Late")
14. "Your Ma Said You Cried in Your Sleep Last Night" (Stephen Schlaks, Robert Glazer) (B-side of "Cry Just a Little Bit" 12")
15. "A Letter to You " (Dennis Linde) (Single)
16. "Come Back and Love Me" (Shakin' Stevens) (B-side of "A Letter to You")

Disc 6

=== Lipstick, Powder and Paint (1985) ===
Lipstick, Powder and Paint saw Shaky reunite with fellow Welshman Dave Edmunds who had produced the first Shakin' Stevens and the Sunsets album A Legend in 1970. However, despite the inclusion of the rocking title track and covers of Chuck Berry and Billy Fury songs, the album was not a total return to the traditional rock and roll sound of earlier Stevens releases. It was also the first album since Take One! (1980) not to contain any top 10 singles, although the Christmas number 1 single "Merry Christmas Everyone" (not included on the album) was released during this period. Perhaps as an indication of Stevens' fading popularity, Epic chose not to issue the album on compact disc when originally released in 1985 and, as a result, The Epic Masters presents the album's first official CD release.

The bonus track "I'll Give You My Heart" featured on this disc is the remixed version which was the B-Side to the single "Lipstick Powder And Paint". There was an earlier version on the B-Side to "Breaking Up My Heart" which is not present in this box set, although the CD incorrectly lists it as such.

1. "Lipstick, Powder and Paint" (Jesse Stone)
2. "Bad Reputation" (Gordon Campbell)
3. "Don't Lie to Me" (Chuck Berry)
4. "I'm Leaving You" (Gavin Povey, Vincent Laurentis)
5. "The Shape I'm In" (Lee Cathy, Otis Blackwell)
6. "Don't Knock Upon My Door" (Billy Fury)
7. "Turning Away" (Tim Krekel)
8. "Love You Out Loud" (Gerald Milne)
9. "As Long as I Have You" (Shakin' Stevens)
10. "With My Heart" (B. Roberts, D. Edwards, S. Stevens)
11. "Ain't It a Shame (You Win Again) (Roger Dexter)
12. "So Long Baby Goodbye" (David Alvin)

Bonus Tracks

13. "Teardrops" (Shakin' Stevens) (Single) featuring Hank Marvin on lead guitar
14. "You Shake Me Up" (Gary Sulsh, Stuart Leathwood) (B-side of "Teardrops")
15. "Breaking Up My Heart" (Bob Heatlie) (Single)
16. *"I'll Give You My Heart (Remix)" (Shakin' Stevens) (B-side of "Lipstick, Powder and Paint")

Disc 7

=== Let's Boogie (1987) ===
Split into a studio side and a live side, 1987's Let's Boogie was Stevens' first album release for two years. Using a variety of producers, four of the five studio tracks were released as singles, one of which, "What Do You Want to Make Those Eyes at Me For?", was to become Shaky's last top 10 single in the UK. The version of the song included on The Epic Masters is the single mix and not the one included on the original album release, which was apparently an earlier recording that was issued in error by Epic Records. The second half of the album consisted entirely of a 23-minute medley of Shaky's hits recorded at the London Palladium in December 1986. The album received a full CD issue on its original 1987 release. The medley now plays as one complete track, where as before on the 1987 release it was chaptered. It was rectified for 'random' playing in CD players to let the live medley flow correctly.

1. "Come See About Me" (Brian Holland, Lamont Dozier, Edward Holland Jr.)
2. "Forever You" (Gary Sulsh, Stuart Leathwood)
3. "A Little Boogie Woogie (In the Back of My Mind)" (Mike Leander, Seago, Gary Glitter)
4. "Because I Love You" (Gordon Campbell)
5. "What Do You Want to Make Those Eyes at Me For?" (Joseph McCarthy, Howard Johnson, James V. Monaco)
6. "The Hits Keep Coming – Live Medley '86"
  "Cry Just a Little Bit" (Bob Heatlie)
  "You Drive Me Crazy" (Ronnie Harwood)
  "A Rockin' Good Way (To Mess Around and Fall in Love)" (Brook Benton, Clyde Otis, Luchi DeJesus)
  "Give Me Your Heart Tonight" (Billy Livsey)
  "A Love Worth Waiting For" (Gary Sulsh, Stuart Leathwood)
  "Green Door" (Bob Davie, Marvin Moore)
  "I'll Be Satisfied" (Berry Gordy Jr., Tyran Carlo)
  "A Letter to You" (Dennis Linde)
  "Shirley" (John Fred, Tommy Bryan)
  "Oh Julie" (Shakin' Stevens)
  "It's Late" (Dorsey Burnette)
  "Marie Marie" (Dave Alvin)
  "It's Raining" (Naomi Neville)
  "Hot Dog" (Owens, Dedmon)
  "Teardrops" (Shakin' Stevens)
  "This Ole House" (Stuart Hamblen)

Bonus Tracks

7. "Tell Me One More Time" (Shakin' Stevens) (B-side of "Because I Love You")
8. "If You're Gonna Cry" (Gary Sulsh, Stuart Leathwood) (B-side of "A Little Boogie Woogie (In the Back of My Mind)")

Disc 8

=== A Whole Lotta Shaky (1988) ===
A Whole Lotta Shaky, released in 1988, was a combination of newly recorded tracks sprinkled with a few older recordings. Three songs from 1981 were included ("Oh Julie", plus two tracks from the Shaky album) as well as the single mix of the previous year's "What Do You Want to Make Those Eyes at Me For?" (which means the same mix is now included on two discs of The Epic Masters). None of the newly recorded singles from the album reached the UK top 20, despite an attempt to bring Stevens' sound up to date by having Art of Noise re-mix "Jezebel" for single release. That 7" mix is now included as a bonus track on The Epic Masters. "How Many Tears Can You Hide" is the PWL Pete Hammond mixed CD single version and not the original album or vinyl 7" version. Included for the first time on this release is a new mix of "Woman (What Have You Done to Me)" and a non fade out version of "Hello Josephine". Because the new material only lasted 22 mins, the album is "humorously" referred to as "Notta Lotta Shaky" by long term fans.

1. "What Do You Want to Make Those Eyes at Me For?" (Joseph McCarthy, Howard Johnson, James V. Monaco)
2. "How Many Tears Can You Hide" (Miller, Lyle)
3. "Jezebel" (Wayne Shanklin)
4. "Sea of Love" (George Khoury, John Phillip Baptiste)
5. "True Love" (Cole Porter)
6. "Just One Look" (Doris Payne, Gregory Carroll)
7. "Oh Julie" (Shakin' Stevens)
8. "Do You Really Love Me Too" (Mark Barkan, Ben Raleigh)
9. "I'm Gonna Sit Right Down and Write Myself a Letter" (Fred E. Ahlert, Joe Young)
10. "Hello Josephine" (Dave Bartholomew, Fats Domino)
11. "Woman (What Have You Done to Me)" (Bob Heatlie)
12. "Heartbeat" (Gordon Campbell)
13. "Tired of Toein' the Line" (Rocky Burnette, Ron Coleman)
14. "Mona Lisa" (Jay Livingston, Ray Evans)

Bonus Tracks

15. "Feel the Need in Me" (Tilmon Jr.) (Single)
16. "If I Can't Have You" (Shakin' Stevens, Tony Rivers) (B-side of "Feel the Need in Me")
17. "If I Really Knew" (Newcombe, Taggart) (b-side of "How Many Tears Can You Hide")
18. "Come On Little Girl (Chrome Sitar)" (Marc Bolan) (B-side of "True Love")
19. "Jezebel" (Wayne Shanklin) (7" re-mix single with Art of Noise)

Disc 9

=== There Are Two Kinds of Music... Rock 'n' Roll (1990) ===
In a further attempt to update his sound, Stevens' recorded There Are Two Kind of Music... Rock 'n' Roll with producer Pete Hammond at Pete Waterman's PWL Studios. In total five singles were released from the album, although the last of these, "My Cutie Cutie", only managed to limp to number 75 in the UK singles chart. Although the singles were released by Epic (as well as the Europe edition of the album), the album itself was issued in the UK by Telstar Records and was supported by a TV advertising campaign. The album was also later released on Ronco. The Epic Masters edition also contains Stevens' last single for Epic, 1992's "Radio". Recorded with the help of Queen drummer Roger Taylor, "Radio" was released in support of The Epic Years, a greatest hits collection which effectively brought to an end Shaky's 14-year relationship with the label.

1. "Love Attack" (Steve and Heather Taylor)
2. "I Might" (Gary Sulsh, Stuart Leathwood, Barrie Guard)
3. "Yes I Do" (Gary Sulsh, Stuart Leathwood)
4. "You Shake Me Up" (Re-mix) (Gary Sulsh, Stuart Leathwood)
5. "Tell Me" (Steve and Heather Taylor)
6. "Tear It Up" (Paul Burlison, Dorsey Burnette, Johnny Burnette)
7. "My Cutie Cutie" (Ronnie Harwood)
8. "The Night Time Is the Right Time" (Parkhill)
9. "Pink Champagne" (Steve and Heather Taylor)
10. "If I Lose You" (Billy Fury)
11. "Queen of the Hop" (Bobby Darin, Woody Harris)
12. "Rockin' the Night Away" (Shakin' Stevens)

Bonus Tracks

13. "Love Attack" (Steve and Heather Taylor) (Single version)
14. "Love Won't Stop" (Shakin' Stevens) (B-side of "I Might")
15. "Radio" (Single version) (Gordon Campbell, Bob Heatlie)
16. "Radio" (Acoustic) (Gordon Campbell, Bob Heatlie) (Bonus version from CD single #1 "Radio")
17. "Oh Baby Don't (Out Take)" (Shakin' Stevens) (B-side of "Radio")

Disc 10

=== The 12" CD ===
The tenth disc of The Epic Masters is entitled The 12" CD and is a collection of some extended mixes previously only issued on Stevens' 12" singles. John Luongo also remixed the 12" version of "Breaking Up My Heart" but unlike "Cry Just a Little Bit" it was not credited as 'Luongo's Mix' and simply became 'Extended Remix' on the vinyl 12" sleeve and label. The "Jezebel (Monster Remix)" was remixed by J. J. Jeczalik of The Art of Noise.

1. "Cry Just a Little Bit" (Luongo's Mix) (Bob Heatlie)
2. "Breaking Up My Heart" (Extended Remix) (Bob Heatlie)
3. "A Little Boogie Woogie (In the Back of My Mind)" (Boogie Mix) (Leander, Seago, Glitter)
4. "Come See About Me" (Extended Remix) (Brian Holland, Lamont Dozier, Edward Holland Jr.)
5. "Feel the Need in Me" (Dance Mix) (Tilmon Jr.)
6. "How Many Tears Can You Hide" (Dance Mix) (Miller, Lyle)
7. "Jezebel" (Monster Remix) (Wayne Shanklin)
8. "Love Attack" (Extended Version) (Steve and Heather Taylor)
