= Give Me Your Heart Tonight =

Studio album by Shakin' Stevens
- Released: 1 October 1982
- Recorded: 1981–1982
- Studios: Eden Studios, London
- Genres: Rock and roll; pop
- Length: 40:08
- Label: Epic
- Producer: Stuart Colman

Shakin' Stevens chronology
Shaky (1981)	Give Me Your Heart Tonight (1982)	The Bop Won't Stop (1983)

Singles from Give Me Your Heart Tonight
- 1. "Oh Julie" Released: 8 January 1982; 2. "Shirley" Released: 16 April 1982; 3. "Give Me Your Heart Tonight" Released: 18 August 1982; 4. "I'll Be Satisfied" Released: 8 October 1982; 5. "Vanessa" Released: 1982

Professional ratings
Review scores
Source	Rating
AllMusic	2.5/5 stars
Encyclopedia of Popular Music	2/5 stars
Record Mirror	2/5 stars
Smash Hits	6/10 stars

Give Me Your Heart Tonight is an album by Welsh rock and roll singer Shakin' Stevens, released in October 1982 by Epic Records. To date, it is his last studio album to reach the Top-Ten in the UK, peaking at number 3 on the Album Chart.

== Release ==
In total, five singles were released from the album. "Oh Julie" was the first released, reaching number 1 in the UK and was also Stevens' first self-penned hit. A cover of John Fred and the Playboys' "Shirley" was released next, also becoming a Top-Ten hit. The title track "Give Me Your Heart" peaked at number 11, ending Stevens' run of six consecutive UK Top-Ten singles. The next single, a cover of Jackie Wilson's "I'll Be Satisfied" scraped into the Top-Ten. The final single, "Vanessa" was only released In South Africa, with the B-side being "I'll Be Satisfied".

In the US and Canada, the album was released in March 1983 with only 10 tracks, omitting "Sapphire", "You Never Talk About Me" and "Que Sera, Sera". The album was first released on CD in 1990 in Australia, but was not officially released on CD elsewhere until 2009 as part of The Epic Masters box set, which includes bonus tracks.

== Reception ==
Reviewing the album for Record Mirror, Simon Tebbutt gave it two out of five stars, writing that "apart from the obligatory "Julie" and "Shirley" singles", the album offers "nothing more than a tired old parade of clapped out classics". He describes Stevens' as "beyond a joke these days. Decanted, disinfected rock 'n' roll that runs to the plaintive on numbers like the title track "Give Me Your Heart Tonight" and the desperate attempts at raucousness on numbers like "Sapphire"."

For Smash Hits, Kimberley Leston gave the album six of out ten and wrote "even if you've only heard one of Shaky's singles, then you've heard this entire album." "Shaky's sugary sweetness leaves you momentarily satisfied but soon you feel a bit ill and in need of some sustenance."

Reviewed in Billboard, in Recommended LP's: "Now that the Stray Cats have made it, can the more cleaned up rockabilly of Shakin' Stevens be far behind". "The songs here are catchy, and there is certainly heart-throb appeal."

Retrospectively reviewing for AllMusic, Dave Thompson wrote that the album's "slickness and sheen were so pronounced that, even today, it simply feels too over-produced for its own good. Up until now, even Stevens' most egregious pop confections had retained a hint of the old rock & rolling energy for which he was once renowned. But 1982 saw him grab the mantel of Family Entertainer with such resolve that the past was all but irrelevant, and the songs that make up Give Me Your Heart Tonight are little more than watery pop. The thrill had gone -- or, as the album's closing number simpered, "que sera sera"."

== Track listing ==
Side one
No.	Title	Writer(s)	Length
1.	"Josephine"	Shakin' Stevens	3:01
2.	"Give Me Your Heart Tonight"	Billy Livsey	3:04
3.	"Sapphire"	Jack Hammer	2:40
4.	"Oh Julie"	Stevens	2:31
5.	"I'll Be Satisfied"	Berry Gordy, Jr.; Tyran Carlo	3:11
6.	"Vanessa"	Billy Swan; Dennis Linde	3:50

Side two
No.	Title	Writer(s)	Length
7.	"Boppity Bop"	Stevens	3:15
8.	"Don't Tell Me We're Through"	Stevens	4:39
9.	"Shirley"	John Fred; Tommy Bryan	2:47
10.	"You Never Talked About Me"	Doc Pomus; Mort Shuman	2:31
11.	"Too Too Much"	Stuart Leathwood; Gary Sulsh	3:25
12.	"(Yeah) You're Evil"	Stevens	2:11
13.	"Que Sera, Sera"	Jay Livingston; Ray Evans	3:03
Total length:			40:08

2009 bonus tracks:

No.	Title	Writer(s)	Length
14.	"I'm for You" (B-side of "Shirley")	Stevens	2:34
15.	"Thinkin' of You" (B-side of "Give Me Your Heart Tonight")	Stevens	2:22
16.	"Don't Be Late (Miss Kate)" (B-side of "I'll Be Satisfied")	Stevens	2:41
17.	"Lawdy Miss Clawdy" (Live; From Shakin' Stevens Special Edition EP)	Lloyd Price	3:07

== Personnel ==
Shaky's musicians

- Shakin' Stevens – vocals
- Dick Bland – bass guitar
- Billy Bremner – lead guitar
- Roger McKew – rhythm guitar
- Gavin Povey – piano, accordion
- Chris Wyles – drums
- Ray Beavis – tenor saxophone
- John "Irish" Earle – baritone saxophone
- Chris Gower – trombone
- Dick Hanson – trumpet

Guest musicians

- B. J. Cole – steel guitar (11)
- Stuart Colman – bass guitar (1, 3, 4, 6, 9, 11)
- Mickey Gee – lead guitar (4, 6, 9, 11)
- Howard Tibble – drums (4, 6, 9, 11)
- Geraint Watkins – piano/accordion (4, 6, 9, 11)
- Pete Wingfield – piano (1, 3)

Technical

- Rod Houison – engineer
- Neill King – engineer
- Stuart Colman – producer
- Freya Miller – management
- Allan Ballard – photography

== Charts ==
Chart (1982–83)	Peak position
Austrian Albums (Ö3 Austria)	6
Dutch Albums (Album Top 100)	15
German Albums (Offizielle Top 100)	10
Norwegian Albums (VG-lista)	6
Swedish Albums (Sverigetopplistan)	19
UK Albums (Official Charts)	3

== Certifications and sales ==
Region	Certification	Certified units/sales
United Kingdom (BPI)	Platinum	300,000^{^}
^{^} Shipments figures based on certification alone.
