= Shirley (song) =

1959 song by John Fred and the Playboys

Single by John Fred and the Playboys
- B-side: "My Love for You"
- Released: December 1958
- Studio: Cosimo Recording Studios, New Orleans
- Genre: Rock & roll; rhythm & blues
- Length: 2:05
- Label: Montel
- Songwriters: John Fred Gourrier; Tommy Bryan

John Fred and the Playboys singles chronology
"Shirley" (1958)	"Mirror, Mirror (On the Wall)" (1959)

"Shirley" is a song originally released by John Fred and the Playboys in December 1958 by Montel Records. It was the band's debut single and reached number 82 on the Billboard Hot 100 in March 1959. The song became an international hit in 1982 when it was covered by Shakin' Stevens, peaking at number 6 on the UK Singles Chart.

== John Fred and the Playboys version ==
"Shirley" was recorded at Cosimo Matassa's recording studios in New Orleans when John Fred was just 17 years old, after local dance promoter in Baton Rouge, Sam Montalbano was impressed by the band. Fats Domino's backing band helped out on the recording as Domino recorded "Whole Lotta Lovin'" prior to John Fred and the Playboys' recording session. The success of the song led Fred to appear on Alan Freed's New York show The Big Beat. The single might have been more successful had Fred not turned down the opportunity to appear on American Bandstand to instead play for his high school basketball team.

=== Charts ===
Chart (1959)	Peak position
US Billboard Hot 100	82

== Shakin' Stevens version ==
"Shirley"

Single by Shakin' Stevens

from the album Give Me Your Heart Tonight
- B-side: "I'm for You"
- Released: 16 April 1982
- Studio: Eden Studios, London
- Genre: Rock and roll
- Length: 2:47
- Label: Epic
- Songwriters: John Fred Gourrier; Tommy Bryan
- Producer: Stuart Colman

Shakin' Stevens singles chronology
"Oh Julie" (1982)	"Shirley" (1982)	"Give Me Your Heart Tonight" (1982)

Shakin' Stevens released a cover of the song in April 1982 under Epic Records as the second single from his album Give Me Your Heart Tonight.

=== Personnel ===
- Shakin' Stevens – vocals
- Mickey Gee – lead guitar
- Geraint Watkins – piano, accordion
- Stuart Colman – bass guitar, producer
- Howard Tibble – drums
- Rod Houison – engineer

=== Charts ===
Chart (1982)	Peak position
Austria (Ö3 Austria Top 40)	4
Belgium (Ultratop 50 Flanders)	10
Denmark (Hitlisten)	2
Finland (Suomen virallinen lista)	23
Germany (GfK)	7
Ireland (IRMA)	4
Israel (IBA)	3
Netherlands (Dutch Top 40)	12
Netherlands (Single Top 100)	11
Norway (VG-lista)	3
South Africa (Springbok Radio)	15
Sweden (Sverigetopplistan)	3
Switzerland (Schweizer Hitparade)	4
UK Singles (Official Charts)	6
