= This Ole House (album) =

This Ole House (Marie, Marie)

Studio album by Shakin' Stevens
- Released: 17 October 1980 (Marie, Marie); 27 March 1981 (This Ole House)
- Recorded: 1980
- Studios: Eden Studios, Chiswick
- Genre: Rock and roll
- Label: Epic
- Producer: Stuart Colman

Shakin' Stevens chronology
Take One! (1980)	This Ole House (Marie, Marie) (1980)	Shaky (1981)

Singles from This Ole House
- 1. "Hey Mae" Released: 2 May 1980; 2. "Marie, Marie" Released: 18 July 1980; 3. "Shooting Gallery" Released: 17 October 1980; 4. "This Ole House" Released: 20 February 1981

Professional ratings
Review scores
Source	Rating
AllMusic	3.5/5 stars
Encyclopedia of Popular Music	3/5 stars
Record Mirror	4.5/5 stars

This Ole House is a 1980/1981 album by Welsh rock and roll singer Shakin' Stevens. The album was originally released in October 1980 under the name Marie, Marie but failed to chart. When single "This Ole House" reached No. 1 in the UK Singles Chart the album was re-issued in March 1981 with the new title and song added, peaking at No. 2 in the UK Albums Chart.

== Background ==
The album was originally released in October 1980 on the back of his first top 20 hit "Marie, Marie". However, a later single "This Ole House" became a much bigger hit, peaking at No. 1 for three weeks in March 1981. The album was quickly re-issued with the same cover but now under the title This Ole House. It peaked at No. 2, giving Stevens' his first top ten album. It spent 28 weeks on the UK Charts and was certified Gold by the BPI. The album also contains earlier singles "Hey Mae" and "Shooting Gallery".

"Marie, Marie" is a song by Dave Alvin and his band The Blasters, released on their 1980 album American Music.

"This Ole House" replaced the song "Two Hearts" (later titled "Two Hearts Two Kisses") from the original album. The album retained most of the same musicians from the Take One! (1980) album, with the addition of Welsh guitarist (and ex-member of Stevens' previous backing group the Sunsets) Mickey Gee.

The album was re-issued on CD for the first time in 2009 as part of The Epic Masters boxset.

== Track listing ==
No.	Title	Writer(s)	Length
1.	"Hey Mae"	Rusty Kershaw, Doug Kershaw	2:32
2.	"Baby If We Touch"	Shakin' Stevens	3:02
3.	"Marie Marie"	Dave Alvin	2:45
4.	"Lonely Blue Boy"	Ben Weisman, Fred Wise	3:12
5.	"Make It Right Tonight"	Shakin' Stevens	2:59
6.	"Move"	Peter Green, C. McNabb, Jr.	3:10

No.	Title	Writer(s)	Length
7.	"Slippin' and Slidin'"	Richard Penniman, Eddie Bocage, Al Collins, James Smith	2:33
8.	"Shooting Gallery"	Brian Hodgson, Tony Colton	3:11
9.	"Revenue Man"	Donny Young	2:45
10.	"Make Me Know You're Mine"	Aaron Schroeder, David Hill	4:31
11.	"This Ole House"	Stuart Hamblen	2:58
12.	"Nobody""	Wayne Carson Thompson	3:12

No.	Title	Writer(s)	Length
13.	"Two Hearts Two Kisses"	Jesse Stone, Otis Williams	2:58

== Personnel ==
- Shakin' Stevens – vocals
- Albert Lee – lead guitar
- Eddie Jones – electric guitar
- Mickey Gee – lead guitar
- Roger McKew – rhythm guitar
- B.J. Cole – steel guitar
- Geraint Watkins – piano
- Stuart Colman – bass
- Howard Tibble – drums
- Tony Hall – tenor saxophone
- Sid Phillips – baritone saxophone

Production

- Aldo Bocca, Rod Houison – engineers
- Freya Miller – management
- Neill King, Nick Froome – assistants
- Simon Fowler – photography

== Charts ==
=== Weekly charts ===
Chart (1981)	Peak position
Australian Albums (Kent Music Report)	6
Austrian Albums (Ö3 Austria)	7
Dutch Albums (Album Top 100)	13
Finnish Albums (Suomen virallinen lista)	26
German Albums (Offizielle Top 100)	4
New Zealand Albums (RMNZ)	13
UK Albums (Official Charts)	2

=== Year-end charts ===
Chart (1981)	Position
German Albums (Offizielle Top 100)	25

== Certifications and sales ==
Region	Certification	Certified units/sales
Australia (ARIA)	2× Platinum	100,000^{^}
Germany (BVMI)	Gold	250,000^{^}
United Kingdom (BPI)	Gold	100,000^{^}
^{^} Shipments figures based on certification alone.
