= Shaky (album) =

Studio album by Shakin' Stevens
- Released: 4 September 1981
- Recorded: 1981
- Studio: Eden Studios, London
- Genre: Rock and roll; pop
- Length: 39:04
- Label: Epic
- Producer: Stuart Colman

Shakin' Stevens chronology
This Ole House (1980)	Shaky (1981)	Give Me Your Heart Tonight (1982)

Singles from Shaky
- 1. "You Drive Me Crazy" Released: 24 April 1981; 2. "Green Door" Released: 17 July 1981; 3. "It's Raining" Released: 2 October 1981

Professional ratings
Review scores
Source	Rating
AllMusic	3.5/5 stars
Encyclopedia of Popular Music	4/5 stars
Smash Hits	8/10

Shaky is an album released by Shakin' Stevens in 1981. Released at the peak of his popularity, Shaky was the first and, to date, only UK number 1 album for Shakin' Stevens. The album features three top-ten singles, most notably "Green Door", which enjoyed a month at number one during the summer of 1981. Despite Shaky's reputation as a rock and roll cover artist, the album contained five of his own compositions as well as the original song "You Drive Me Crazy", which spent four weeks at number two in the UK singles chart in the spring of 1981. A cover of "It's Raining", released in the autumn, also managed to reach the top ten in the UK.

Produced by Stuart Colman, the album retained most of the musicians from Shaky's previous album, notably Mickey Gee, BJ Cole and Geraint Watkins, and was again recorded at the Eden Studios in Chiswick.

The album was issued in Australia under the title Green Door with a slightly different track listing where it was also released on CD in the early 1990s. In Europe, it was only officially released on CD for the first time in 2009 as part of The Epic Masters box set.

== Track listing ==
Side one
No.	Title	Writer(s)	Length
1.	"Mona Lisa"	Jay Livingston, Ray Evans	2:15
2.	"You Drive Me Crazy"	Ronnie Harwood	2:49
3.	"I'm Knockin'"	Shakin' Stevens	2:50
4.	"It's Raining"	Naomi Neville	3:18
5.	"Don't She Look Good"	Joey Spampinato	2:09
6.	"Green Door"	Bob Davie, Marvin Moore	3:09
7.	"Don't Bug Me Baby"	Leon Luallen, Johnny Bragg	2:50

Side two
No.	Title	Writer(s)	Length
1.	"Don't Tell Me Your Troubles"	Don Gibson	2:29
2.	"I'm Gonna Sit Right Down and Write Myself a Letter"	Fred E. Ahlert, Joe Young	3:21
3.	"This Time"	Chips Moman	2:50
4.	"Baby You're A Child"	Stevens	2:35
5.	"Don't Turn Your Back"	Stevens	2:59
6.	"Let Me Show You"	Stevens	2:49
7.	"I'm Looking"	Stevens	2:41

== Personnel ==
- Produced by Stuart Colman
- Recorded at Eden Studios
- Engineer – Rod Houison
- Assisted by Nick Froome, Neill King

=== Musicians ===
- Mickey Gee – lead and rhythm guitars
- Stuart Colman – bass
- Roger McKew – guitars
- Howard Tibble – drums
- Geraint Watkins – piano
- Tony Hall – tenor saxophone
- Sid Phillips – tenor and baritone saxophones
- B.J. Cole – steel guitar

== Charts ==
=== Weekly charts ===
Chart (1981–82)	Peak position
Australia (Kent Music Report)	11
Austrian Albums (Ö3 Austria)	1
Dutch Albums (Album Top 100)	10
Finnish Albums (Suomen virallinen lista)	27
German Albums (Offizielle Top 100)	4
Icelandic Albums (Vísir)	2
New Zealand Albums (RMNZ)	29
Norwegian Albums (VG-lista)	2
Swedish Albums (Sverigetopplistan)	2
UK Albums (OCC)	1

=== Year-end charts ===
Chart (1982)	Position
Austrian Albums (Ö3 Austria)	2
Dutch Albums (Album Top 100)	88
German Albums (Offizielle Top 100)	12

== Certifications and sales ==
Region	Certification	Certified units/sales
Australia (ARIA)	Platinum	50,000^{^}
Germany (BVMI)	Gold	250,000^{^}
United Kingdom (BPI)	Platinum	300,000^{^}
^{^} Shipments figures based on certification alone.
