= You Drive Me Crazy =

1981 single by Shakin' Stevens

Single by Shakin' Stevens

from the album Shaky
- B-side: "Baby You're a Child"
- Released: 24 April 1981
- Recorded: 1980
- Studio: Eden Studios, London
- Genre: Rock and roll
- Length: 2:40
- Label: Epic
- Songwriter: Ronnie Harwood
- Producer: Stuart Colman

Shakin' Stevens singles chronology
"This Ole House" (1981)	"You Drive Me Crazy" (1981)	"Green Door" (1981)

"You Drive Me Crazy" is a song by Welsh rock and roll singer Shakin' Stevens, released in April 1981 from his album Shaky. It peaked at number 2 on the UK Singles Chart for four weeks behind Adam and the Ants' "Stand and Deliver".

== Charts ==
=== Weekly charts ===
Chart (1981)	Peak position
Australia (Kent Music Report)	1
Austria (Ö3 Austria Top 40)	6
Belgium (Ultratop 50 Flanders)	4
Denmark (Tracklisten)	1
Finland (Suomen virallinen lista)	10
France (IFOP)	9
Ireland (IRMA)	1
Israel (IBA)	5
Netherlands (Dutch Top 40)	4
Netherlands (Single Top 100)	5
New Zealand (Recorded Music NZ)	2
South Africa (Springbok Radio)	3
Sweden (Sverigetopplistan)	9
Switzerland (Schweizer Hitparade)	4
UK Singles (OCC)	2
West Germany (GfK)	6

=== Year-end charts ===
Chart (1981)	Position
Australia (Kent Music Report)	19
Belgium (Ultratop)	44
Denmark (Hitlisten)	3
Netherlands (Dutch Top 40)	62
Netherlands (Single Top 100)	81
New Zealand (RIANZ)	26
UK Singles (OCC)	10
West Germany (Media Control)	21

== Certifications and sales ==
Region	Certification	Certified units/sales
Australia (ARIA)	Gold	50,000^{^}
United Kingdom (BPI)	Gold	500,000^{^}
^{^} Shipments figures based on certification alone.
