= The Shakin' Stevens EP =

1982 EP by Shakin' Stevens

EP by Shakin' Stevens
- Released: 3 December 1982
- Recorded: October–November 1982
- Venues: Gaumont Theatre, Southampton (tracks 2–4)
- Studios: Eden Studios, London (track 1)
- Genres: Rock and roll; Christmas
- Length: 11:51
- Label: Epic
- Producer: Stuart Colman

Shakin' Stevens chronology
Give Me Your Heart Tonight (1982)	The Shakin' Stevens EP (1982)	The Bop Won't Stop (1983)

The Shakin' Stevens EP is a 4-track EP by Welsh singer Shakin' Stevens, released in December 1982 only in the UK and Ireland. It peaked at number 2 on the UK Singles Chart for two weeks behind Renée and Renato's "Save Your Love".

== Title ==
The EP doesn't have an official title and was widely referred to at the time as 'The Shakin' Stevens EP' despite the fact that this title isn't mentioned anywhere on the sleeve or record. The sleeve indicates that the title is 'Special Edition EP', though both titles "could be seen as descriptions rather than titles". The record label only lists the song titles and doesn't give an overall title. On the 2009 box set, The Epic Masters, which includes "Lawdy Miss Clawdy" as a bonus track, the EP is referred to as the 'Shakin' Stevens Special Edition EP'.

== Content and release ==
The EP features three cover songs: "Blue Christmas", best known for the version by Elvis Presley in 1964; "Lawdy Miss Clawdy", originally by Lloyd Price in 1952; and "Que Sera, Sera", originally by Doris Day in 1956. The other song on the EP, "Josephine" was written by Stevens. The record has "Lawdy Miss Clawdy" and "Que Sera, Sera" on the A-side, with "Blue Christmas" and "Josephine" on the AA-side. However, the record label lists the AA-side first.

"Blue Christmas" was recorded on 22 November 1982 at Eden Studios. The other three songs are live recordings from the Gaumont Theatre (now called the Mayflower Theatre) in Southampton during Stevens' October and November 1982 British Tour. Two of the songs, "Que Sera, Sera" and "Josephine" had featured on Stevens' album Give Me Your Heart Tonight.

It was originally released in a gatefold sleeve with later releases coming as a single sleeve. A promo single was also released with "Blue Christmas" as the A-side and "Lawdy Miss Clawdy" as the B-side.

== Track listings ==
Side AA
No.	Title	Writer(s)	Length
1.	"Blue Christmas"	Billy Hayes; Jay W. Johnson	2:48
2.	"Josephine" (Live)	Shakin' Stevens	2:59

Side A
No.	Title	Writer(s)	Length
3.	"Lawdy Miss Clawdy" (Live)	Lloyd Price	3:04
4.	"Que Sera, Sera" (Live)	Jay Livingston; Ray Evans	3:00
Total length:			11:51

Promo single
No.	Title	Writer(s)	Length
1.	"Blue Christmas"	Billy Hayes; Jay W. Johnson	2:48
2.	"Lawdy Miss Clawdy" (Live)	Lloyd Price	3:04

== Charts ==
Chart (1982)	Peak position
Ireland (IRMA)	2
UK Singles (Official Charts)	2

== Certifications ==
Region	Certification	Certified units/sales
United Kingdom (BPI)	Silver	250,000^{^}
^{^} Shipments figures based on certification alone.
