= Take One! (Shakin' Stevens album) =

Studio album by Shakin' Stevens
- Released: 8 February 1980
- Recorded: 1979
- Studio: Eden Studios, London
- Genre: Rock and roll
- Length: 31:24
- Label: Epic
- Producer: Mike Hurst

Shakin' Stevens chronology
Shakin' Stevens (1978)	Take One! (1980)	Marie, Marie (1980)

Singles from Take One!
- 1. "Hot Dog" Released: 4 January 1980

Professional ratings
Review scores
Source	Rating
AllMusic	3.5/5 stars
The Encyclopedia of Popular Music	3/5 stars
Record Mirror	3.5/5 stars
Smash Hits	5/10

Take One! is a 1980 album by British rock and roll singer Shakin' Stevens. It was his first release on Epic Records and his first album to enter the UK charts. The album also featured Stevens' first UK charting single "Hot Dog".

== Background ==
Often erroneously dated as being released in October 1979, Take One! was not released until February 1980, after the "Hot Dog" single had become Stevens' first UK hit single. Produced by Mike Hurst, the album contained a host of experienced session men, including lead guitarist Albert Lee, pianist Geraint Watkins, steel guitarist B.J. Cole and bassist and arranger Stuart Colman. The album charted at No.62 in March 1980 and remained on the UK albums chart for two weeks.

In April 1982 the album was re-released under the new title of Hot Dog with "That's All Right" and "Ah, Poor Little Baby" being replaced by "You and I Were Meant to Be" and "Make it Right Tonight" respectively.

In 2009, Sony Music released a box set of Stevens' original albums called The Epic Masters. This was the first time the album was released on compact disc and contained bonus tracks of his first three non-album singles recorded for Epic in 1978 and 1979.

== Track listing ==
=== Side one ===
1. "Lovestruck" (Ernie Barton) 3:06
2. "Hot Dog" (Buck Owens, Denny Dedmon) 2:48
3. "Is a Bluebird Blue?" (Dan Penn) 3:11
4. "That's All Right" (Gerald Nelson, Fred Burch) 2:10
5. "Without a Love" (Jimmy Isle, Ronnie Isle) 3:21
6. "Shame Shame Shame" (Kenyon Hopkins, Ruby Fisher) 2:09*
- Shame Shame Shame was miscredited as Jimmy McCracklin / Bob Geddins which was another song with the same name.

=== Side two ===
1. "Shotgun Boogie" (Tennessee Ernie Ford) 2:57
2. "I Got Burned" (Ral Donner) 2:17
3. "I Guess I Was a Fool" (Buddy Holly) 2:17
4. "Ah, Poor Little Baby" (Rex Koury, Ruth Falk) 2:20
5. "Little Pigeon" (Ray Whit) 2:43
6. "Do What You Did" (Thurston Harris) 2:05

=== CD bonus tracks (2009) ===
1. "Apron Strings" (George David Weiss, Aaron Schroeder) (B-side of "Hot Dog")
2. "Treat Her Right" (Roy Head, Jean Kurtz) (Single)
3. "I Don't Want No Other Baby" (Dickie Bishop, Bob Watson) (B-side of "Treat Her Right" and "Spooky")
4. "Endless Sleep" (Jody Reynolds, Dolores Nance) (Single)
5. "Fire" (Bruce Springsteen) (B-side of "Endless Sleep")
6. "Spooky" (Buddy Buie, James Cobb, Harry Middlebrooks, Mike Shapiro) (Single)

== Personnel ==
- Shakin' Stevens - vocals
- Stuart Colman - bass
- Howard Tibble - drums
- Albert Lee - lead guitar
- B.J. Cole - pedal steel guitar
- Roger McKew - rhythm guitar
- Geraint Watkins - piano
- Sid Phillips - baritone saxophone
- Tony Hall - tenor saxophone
- Mike Hurst - producer
- Stuart Colman - musical coordinator

== Charts ==
=== Weekly charts ===
Chart (1980)	Peak position
UK Albums (Official Charts)	62

Re-release as Hot Dog

Chart (1982)	Peak position
Austrian Albums (Ö3 Austria)	9
German Albums (Offizielle Top 100)	11

=== Year-end charts ===
Chart (1982)	Position
German Albums (Offizielle Top 100)	28
