= Give Me Your Heart Tonight (song) =

1982 single by Shakin' Stevens

Single by Shakin' Stevens

from the album Give Me Your Heart Tonight
- B-side: "Thinkin' of You"
- Released: 18 August 1982
- Studio: Eden Studios, London
- Genre: Soft rock
- Length: 3:05
- Label: Epic
- Songwriter(s): Billy Livsey
- Producer(s): Stuart Colman

Shakin' Stevens singles chronology
"Shirley" (1982)	"Give Me Your Heart Tonight" (1982)	"I'll Be Satisfied" (1982)

"Give Me Your Heart Tonight" is a song by Welsh singer Shakin' Stevens, released in August 1982 as the third single from his album of the same name. It peaked at number 11 on the UK Singles Chart. With the release of the album, a promo single was also released, which included four songs from the album.

== Track listings ==
7": Epic / A 2656 (UK)

1. "Give Me Your Heart Tonight" – 3:05
2. "Thinkin' of You" – 2:27

7": Epic / XPS 158 (UK, promo)

1. "Give Me Your Heart Tonight"
2. "Boppity Bop"
3. "Oh Julie"
4. "Don't Tell Me That We're Through"

== Charts ==
Chart (1982)	Peak position
Australia (Kent Music Report)	74
Austria (Ö3 Austria Top 40)	10
Belgium (Ultratop 50 Flanders)	6
Denmark (Hitlisten)	2
Germany (GfK)	6
Ireland (IRMA)	5
Netherlands (Dutch Top 40)	10
Netherlands (Single Top 100)	14
Norway (VG-lista)	8
Sweden (Sverigetopplistan)	19
Switzerland (Schweizer Hitparade)	6
UK Singles (OCC)	11
