= It's Raining (Irma Thomas song) =

1961 soul/R&B ballad written by Allen Toussaint

Single by Irma Thomas
- B-side: "I Did My Part"
- Released: August 1962
- Recorded: November 1, 1961
- Studio: Cosimo (New Orleans, Louisiana)
- Genre: Soul, R&B
- Length: 2:08
- Label: Minit 653
- Songwriter(s): Naomi Neville
- Producer(s): Allen Toussaint

Irma Thomas singles chronology
"Gone" (1962)	"It's Raining" (1962)	"Two Winters Long" (1962)

"It's Raining" is a soul/R&B ballad, written by Allen Toussaint under the name "Naomi Neville". It was first recorded in November 1961 by Irma Thomas, and produced by Allen Toussaint. The song has emotional ties to Louisiana, having been written and sung by people born in that state, being released on a New Orleans–based record label and enduring in the Deep South as a regional classic.

"It's Raining", alongside "Ruler of My Heart" and "I Done Got Over It", remain some of Thomas' best-known recordings.

== History ==
Initially Thomas recorded for Ron Records but, in 1961, she left for Minit Records, feeling that her original label did not pay her due royalties. This move paired her with Allen Toussaint, who both wrote and produced most of her work with Minit. As well as "It's Raining", Thomas recorded "Time Is on My Side" and "Ruler of My Heart." The name "Naomi Neville" was Toussaint's mother's name, which he used on many of his early compositions. Although most of her 1961–63 Minit recordings were written and produced by Toussaint, only one of these, "Two Winters Long", made the national charts. It spent three weeks on the Cashbox R&B chart in February 1963, peaking at no. 43. Her version of "It's Too Soon to Know" (Minit 633) was another that failed to chart, however all sold well regionally.

The origin of the song came when Thomas visited Allen Toussaint's parents' house in New Orleans. She sat at the piano where Toussaint composed many of his early songs. Toussaint later stated "I remember when I was writing 'It's Raining,' she was sitting right there, and it began raining outside," he said. "I just wrote that song then and handed it over to her and sung a little bit of it, just to show her the melody, and it fit like a gown." Toussaint captured the solitude possible in the depths of a rain sodden night.

The opening falsetto harmonies captured the drip-drop of rain and tears by using a late 1950s doo-wop singing style. That it became a regional favorite is summed up by one journalist who noted that "Maybe it's because although it speaks to a universal sentimental human experience - romantic heartbreak - it does so with dignity, rather than pour on the sap." Nevertheless, "It's Raining" did not reach any national chart.

"It's Raining" was used in the 1986 independent film by Jim Jarmusch, Down By Law. The film's actors Roberto Benigni and Nicoletta Braschi, whose characters fall in love in the movie, danced to the song.

The song later appeared on the Thomas albums Soul Queen Of New Orleans (1978) and Live! Simply The Best (1991).

== Shakin' Stevens version ==
"It's Raining"

Single by Shakin' Stevens

from the album Shaky
- B-side: "You and I Were Meant to Be"
- Released: 2 October 1981
- Recorded: 1981
- Studio: Eden Studios. London
- Genre: Rock and roll
- Length: 3:18
- Label: Epic
- Songwriter(s): Naomi Neville
- Producer(s): Stuart Colman

Shakin' Stevens singles chronology
"Green Door" (1981)	"It's Raining" (1981)	"Mona Lisa" (1981)

In 1981, Welsh singer Shakin' Stevens released a cover of the song for his album Shaky. It peaked at number 10 on the UK Singles Chart.

=== Charts ===
==== Weekly charts ====
Chart (1981–1982)	Peak position
Australia (Kent Music Report)	75
Austria (Ö3 Austria Top 40)	11
Belgium (Ultratop 50 Flanders)	9
Denmark (Hitlisten)	4
Ireland (IRMA)	2
Israel (IBA)	3
Netherlands (Dutch Top 40)	7
Netherlands (Single Top 100)	8
New Zealand (Recorded Music NZ)	33
UK Singles (OCC)	10
West Germany (GfK)	13

==== Year-end charts ====
Chart (1981)	Position
Belgium (Ultratop Flanders)	97
Netherlands (Dutch Top 40)	77
Netherlands (Single Top 100)	70

=== Certifications and sales ===
Region	Certification	Certified units/sales
United Kingdom (BPI)	Silver	250,000^{^}
^{^} Shipments figures based on certification alone.

== Other cover versions ==
The song has been covered by a number of musicians over the years, most notably including the following:

- Dee Clark – 1964 (on the B-side of his "That's My Girl" single)
- Lenne & The Lee Kings – 1965 (on their album Bingo!! For the Lee Kings)
- Freddy Fender – 1978 (on his album Swamp Gold)
- Lou Ann Barton – 1982 (on her album Old Enough)
- Jennifer Warnes – 2001 (on her album The Well)
- Eleni Mandell – 2003 (on her album Country for True Lovers)
- The Detroit Cobras – 2004 (on their album Baby)
