= Hot Dog! (Buck Owens album) =

Studio album by Buck Owens
- Released: November 16, 1988
- Studio: Maximus
- Genres: Country, rockabilly
- Length: 26:39
- Label: Capitol
- Producer: Jim Shaw

Buck Owens chronology
Our Old Mansion (1977)	Hot Dog! (1988)	Act Naturally (1989)

Hot Dog! is an album by the American musician Buck Owens, released in 1988. It was Owens's first studio album since deciding in 1979 to quit the music business. The first single was the title track, which Owens had originally recorded under the name Corky Jones. Owens shot a video for the single.

The album peaked at No. 37 on the Billboard Top Country Albums chart. Owens supported it with a 1989 North American tour.

== Production ==
Partly recorded in Fresno, the album was produced by Jim Shaw. "Under Your Spell Again" is performed as a duet with Dwight Yoakam. Hot Dog! contains covers of "Summertime Blues" and "Memphis". "A-11" is a cover of the Hank Cochran song; "The Key's in the Mailbox" was written by Harlan Howard. "Second Fiddle" is a version of Owens's first charting single.

== Critical reception ==
Professional ratings
Review scores
Source	Rating
AllMusic	3/5 stars
Robert Christgau	B+
The Encyclopedia of Popular Music	3/5 stars
Houston Chronicle	3/5 stars
The Rolling Stone Album Guide	3/5 stars
Windsor Star	A

Robert Christgau admired the "emotion and commitment" of some of the songs. USA Today praised the "group of rejuvenated rockabilly classics like 'Summertime Blues', 'Put a Quarter in the Jukebox' and 'Keys in the Mailbox'." The Houston Chronicle wrote that the album "is not without its charms ... Owens is still in fine voice."

The Advocate concluded that Hot Dog! "sounds a bit tentative, but that might be expected after many years of semi-retirement... He can still write good songs, and that voice is unmistakable." The Kingston Whig-Standard noted that Owens "attacks each song with zest but at the same time stays within the parameters of traditional country music." The Los Angeles Times stated that Owens's "off-center phrasing always keeps his structurally simple songs of heartbreak and loss musically fresh."

AllMusic wrote that "this isn't one of Owens' best albums by a long shot, but it is a fun session."

== Track listing ==
No.	Title	Writer(s)	Length
1.	"Don't Let Her Know"	Bonnie Owens; Buck Owens; Don Rich	2:40
2.	"A-11"	Hank Cochran	2:33
3.	"Summertime Blues"	Jerry Capehart; Eddie Cochran	2:20
4.	"Memphis"	Chuck Berry	2:25
5.	"Hot Dog"	Denny Dedmon; Buck Owens	2:20
6.	"Put a Quarter in the Jukebox"	Buck Owens	3:07
7.	"Under Your Spell Again" (with Dwight Yoakam)	Buck Owens; Dusty Rhodes	2:55
8.	"Second Fiddle"	Buck Owens	2:35
9.	"Sweethearts in Heaven"	Buck Owens	3:02
10.	"The Key's in the Mailbox"	Harlan Howard	2:42
Total length:			26:39

== Charts ==
Chart (1989)	Peak position
US Top Country Albums	37
