= Green Door =

1956 song by Jim Lowe

"The Green Door"

Single by Jim Lowe with the High Fives

from the album Songs They Sing Behind the Green Door
- B-side: "(The Story of) the Little Man in Chinatown"
- Released: August 1956
- Genre: Rock and roll; pop
- Length: 2:11
- Label: Dot
- Songwriters: Bob Davie, Marvin J. Moore

Jim Lowe singles chronology
"Blue Suede Shoes" (1956)	"The Green Door"	"Prince Of Peace" (1956)

"The Green Door" (or "Green Door") is a 1956 popular song, with music composed by Bob "Hutch" Davie and lyrics by Marvin J. Moore. It was first recorded by Jim Lowe, which reached number one on the US chart in 1956. The song has been covered by a number of artists, including a version by Shakin' Stevens in 1981.

== Lyrics ==
The singer cannot get any sleep each evening, due to the sound of the music coming from a private club. He tries to gain entry by knocking once on the green door, telling the person behind the door that he has been there before, only to have the door slammed immediately ("hospitality's thin there"). Then, through the keyhole, he says the possible secret password, "Joe sent me" (the password for Hernando's Hideaway), which only results in laughter as he is again denied admission to the club.

=== Possible inspirations ===
After the Great Chicago Fire, the Green Door Tavern opened in the city. During the Prohibition era in the United States, it was a popular place to get illicit libations. Because the door of the tavern was green, the color became a symbol for a speakeasy. During Prohibition, many restaurants painted their doors green to indicate the presence of a speakeasy.

Another suggestion about the song's origins is that it was inspired by an afterhours club in Dallas, Texas, to which lyricist Moore had been refused entry because he did not know the correct password.

At the time of the song's initial popularity in the 1950s, many believed it was inspired by a green-doored restaurant and bar called The Shack in Columbia, Missouri, where singer Jim Lowe had attended university. However long-time Shack owner Joe Franke doubts that theory.

An oft-repeated urban legend has developed, claiming that the song refers to London's first lesbian club, Gateways (1930–1985), which was in Bramerton Street, Chelsea. It had a green door and was featured in the film The Killing of Sister George. But aside from that there is no substantive connection between the 1950s American song and the British club.

== Jim Lowe version ==
The song was first recorded by Jim Lowe, whose version reached number one on the US pop chart. The lyrics describe the allure of a mysterious private club with a green door, behind which "a happy crowd" play piano, smoke and "laugh a lot", and inside which the singer is not allowed. "Green Door" was backed by the orchestra of songwriter Davie, with Davie also playing piano, and by the vocal group the High Fives. The track was arranged by Davie, who added thumbtacks to the hammers of his piano and sped up the tape to give a honky-tonk sound. Released by Dot Records, the single reached No. 1 on the Billboard charts for one week on November 17, 1956, replacing "Love Me Tender" by Elvis Presley. Outside the US, Lowe's version reached No. 8 on the charts in the United Kingdom.

=== Charts ===
Chart (1956)	Peak position
UK Singles (Official Charts)	8
US Best Sellers in Stores (Billboard)	1
US Rhythm & Blues Records (Billboard)	5
US Cash Box Best Selling Singles	2
US Cash Box Rhythm & Blues Top 20	12

== Shakin' Stevens version ==
"Green Door"

Single by Shakin' Stevens

from the album Shaky
- B-side: "Don't Turn Your Back"
- Released: 17 July 1981
- Recorded: 1981
- Studio: Eden Studios, London
- Genre: Rock and roll
- Length: 3:09
- Label: Epic
- Songwriters: Bob Davie; Marvin Moore
- Producer: Stuart Colman

Shakin' Stevens singles chronology
"You Drive Me Crazy" (1981)	"Green Door" (1981)	"It's Raining" (1981)

Welsh singer Shakin' Stevens covered the song in 1981 for his album Shaky. It became his second UK number 1, topping the charts for four weeks in August 1981.

=== Charts ===
==== Weekly charts ====
Chart (1981)	Peak position
Australia (Kent Music Report)	8
Austria (Ö3 Austria Top 40)	8
Belgium (Ultratop 50 Flanders)	7
Denmark (Hitlisten)	1
Finland (Suomen virallinen lista)	8
Germany (GfK)	6
Ireland (IRMA)	1
Israel (IBA)	3
Netherlands (Dutch Top 40)	5
Netherlands (Single Top 100)	8
New Zealand (Recorded Music NZ)	2
South Africa (Springbok Radio)	4
Switzerland (Schweizer Hitparade)	5
UK Singles (Official Charts)	1
Zimbabwe (ZIMA)	5

==== Year-end charts ====
Chart (1981)	Position
Belgium (Ultratop Flanders)	82
Denmark (Hitlisten)	21
Germany (GfK Entertainment)	62
Netherlands (Dutch Top 40)	57
Netherlands (Single Top 100)	84
New Zealand (Recorded Music NZ)	18
UK Singles	18

=== Certifications and sales ===
Region	Certification	Certified units/sales
Australia (ARIA)	Gold	50,000^{^}
United Kingdom (BPI)	Gold	500,000^{^}
^{^} Shipments figures based on certification alone.

== Other recordings ==
- In the UK, a version by Frankie Vaughan was more popular than the original, reaching No. 2 in December 1956. Vaughan donated his share of the record's proceeds to charity.
- Another UK recording, by Glen Mason, reached No. 24 on the UK chart in November 1956.
- Gene McDaniels released a version of it as a single in 1960, but it failed to chart.
- Esquerita, as Eskew Reeder, released a mostly wordless organ-led cover version in 1962 (Minit Records #648).
- In 1964, Bill Haley & His Comets recorded a version for a single release on Decca Records during an unsuccessful attempt to make a comeback with the label that had made them famous with "Rock Around the Clock" (this version was produced by Milt Gabler); Haley and the Comets also recorded an instrumental version in 1962 for the Mexican Orfeon Records label.
- Crystal Gayle recorded the song in 1977.
- Psychobilly band the Cramps covered the song on their 1981 album, Psychedelic Jungle.
- The Spanish pop-punk group Los Nikis made a Spanish version in 1986.
- Other versions have been recorded by Roland Alphonso, Wynder K. Frog, Jumpin' Gene Simmons, and Skip & Flip (1961).

== Cultural impact ==
"The Green Door" is the name of a letter written by David Berg, the former leader of the cult once called the Children of God, later renamed The Family. He used it as a metaphorical door to hell.

Behind the Green Door is a 1972 pornographic film starring Marilyn Chambers. In 1986, Behind the Green Door: the Sequel was released, and in 2012, New Behind the Green Door was released.

There are bars, taverns and saloons named The Green Door in many American locations, including Cheyenne, Wyoming; New York City; Park Hall, Maryland; Chicago, Illinois; and Lansing, Michigan.

Within the American intelligence community, "green door" is a slang verb and adjective, relating to the restriction of an individual's or organization's access to information and/or locations: "We green doored them," or "The situation has been highlighted by the 'Green Door' compartmentation and exclusion". This meaning was alluded to in episode 4 of Ashes to Ashes, set in 1981, when Shakin' Stevens' cover played whilst the protagonist police detectives sneaked out of a top-secret MOD research centre.

The song was featured in Quentin Tarantino's 2019 film Once Upon a Time in Hollywood, sung by Leonardo DiCaprio (playing the character of fictional actor Rick Dalton), during a segment on Hullabaloo.

The lyrics "Green door, what's that secret you're keepin'" get a full-page quote (with a smaller attribution text: "Marvin Moore - Lyrics to 'The Green Door'") in the first internal page of The Immortal Hulk #10, a comic book published by Marvel Comics. In that issue (and other issues of the same comic), a particular green door is an integral part of the story.
