= Oh Julie (Shakin' Stevens song) =

Single by Shakin' Stevens

from the album Give Me Your Heart Tonight
- B-side: "I'm Knockin'"
- Released: 8 January 1982
- Recorded: 1981
- Genre: Rock and roll; Rockabilly; Country rock; Cajun
- Length: 2:32
- Label: Epic
- Songwriter: Shakin' Stevens
- Producer: Stuart Colman

Shakin' Stevens singles chronology
"It's Raining" (1981)	"Oh Julie" (1982)	"Shirley" (1982)

Music video
- "Oh Julie" on YouTube

"Oh Julie" was a number one hit in the UK singles chart for one week for Shakin' Stevens in January 1982.

It is Stevens' third number-one single and his first as a writer. The B-side, "I'm Knockin'", was also written by Shakin' Stevens and both tracks benefit from arrangements driven by lead guitarist Mickey Gee. "Oh Julie" also has a cajun flavour courtesy of the accordion backing provided by Geraint Watkins.

== Personnel ==
- Shakin' Stevens – vocals
- Mickey Gee – lead guitar
- Geraint Watkins – piano, accordion
- Stuart Colman – bass guitar, producer
- Howard Tibble – drums
- Rod Houison – engineer

== Chart performance ==
=== Weekly charts ===
Chart (1982)	Peak position
Australia (Kent Music Report)	3
Austria (Ö3 Austria Top 40)	1
Belgium (Ultratop 50 Flanders)	3
Denmark (Hitlisten)	1
Finland (Suomen virallinen lista)	7
France (IFOP)	14
Germany (GfK)	2
Ireland (IRMA)	1
Israel (IBA)	6
Netherlands (Dutch Top 40)	1
Netherlands (Single Top 100)	3
New Zealand (Recorded Music NZ)	5
Norway (VG-lista)	1
South Africa (Springbok Radio)	2
Sweden (Sverigetopplistan)	1
Switzerland (Schweizer Hitparade)	1
UK Singles (OCC)	1
Zimbabwe (ZIMA)	9

=== Year-end charts ===
Chart (1982)	Position
Australia (Kent Music Report)	42
Austria (Ö3 Austria)	11
Belgium (Ultratop Flanders)	20
Denmark (Hitlisten)	3
Germany (GfK Entertainment)	23
Netherlands (Dutch Top 40)	26
Netherlands (Single Top 100)	41
South Africa (Springbok Radio)	12
Switzerland (Schweizer Hitparade)	4
UK Singles	16

=== Certifications and sales ===
Region	Certification	Certified units/sales
United Kingdom (BPI)	Gold	500,000^{^}
^{^} Shipments figures based on certification alone.

== Cover versions ==
- In September 1982, the song peaked at #38 in the US for Barry Manilow.
- Swedish dansband Lasse Stefanz released a version in Swedish in 1982 that charted on the Sverigetopplistan, the official Swedish Singles Chart reaching number 16.

== See also ==
- List of European number-one hits of 1982
- List of number-one hits in Norway
- List of number-one singles and albums in Sweden
- List of number-one singles from the 1980s (Switzerland)
- List of number-one singles from the 1980s (UK)
