= Jim Lowe =

American singer-songwriter (1923–2016)

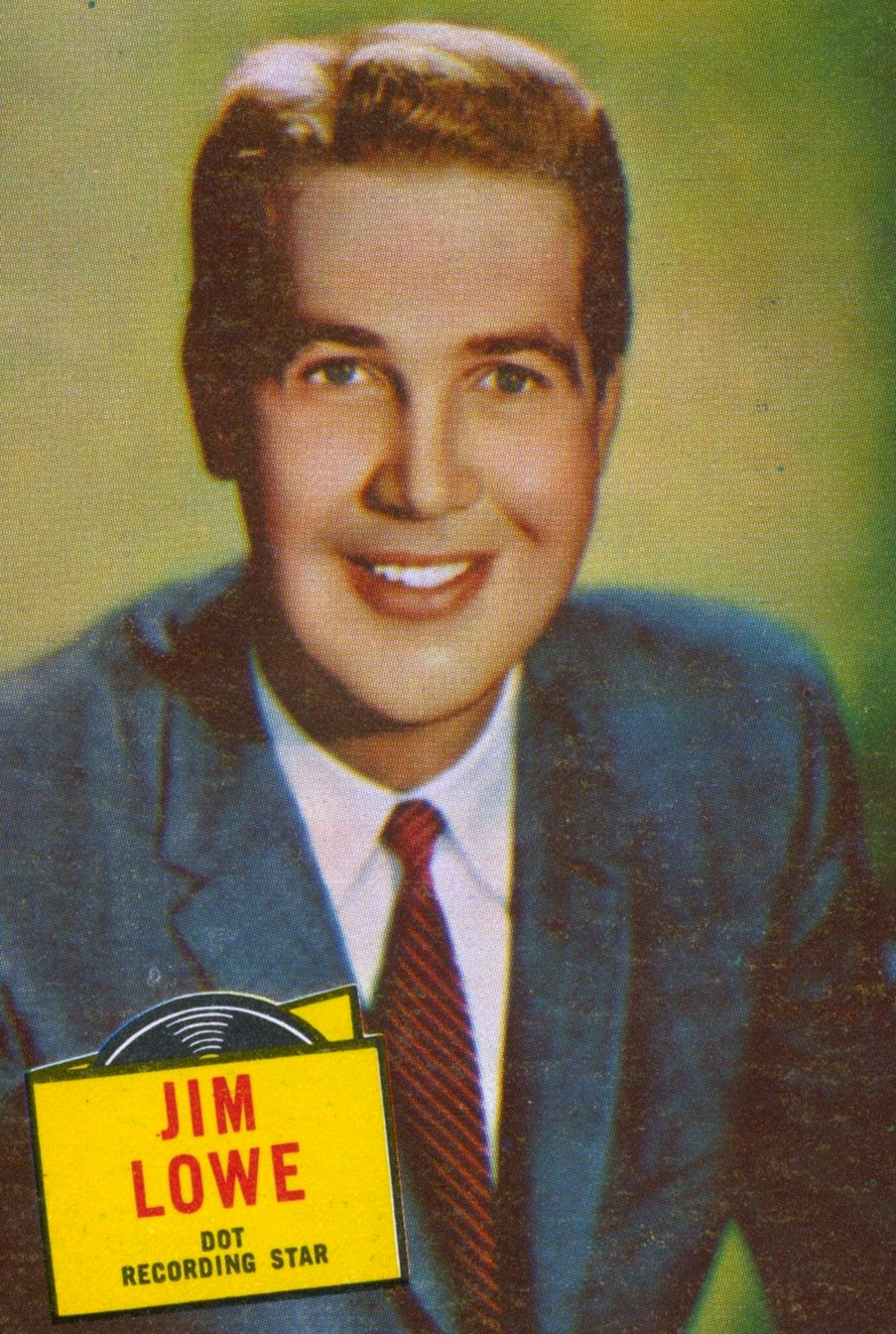
- Lowe in 1957

Background information
- Born: James Ellsworth Lowe; May 7, 1923; Springfield, Missouri, U.S.
- Died: December 12, 2016 (aged 93) East Hampton, New York, U.S.
- Genres: rock and roll, pop
- Occupation: Singer-songwriter
- Years active: 1953–2004
- Labels: Dot, London

James Ellsworth Lowe (May 7, 1923 – December 12, 2016) was an American singer-songwriter, best known for his 1956 number-one hit song, "The Green Door". He also served as a disc jockey and radio host and personality and was considered an expert on the popular music of the 1940s and 1950s.

== Biography ==
Born in Springfield, Missouri, Lowe graduated from the University of Missouri in Columbia in 1948. He worked for several radio stations in Springfield, Indianapolis, and Chicago, before moving to WCBS in New York City in 1956.

A million-seller and gold record recipient, Lowe's 1956 hit "The Green Door" was written by Marvin Moore and Bob "Hutch" Davie. The song reached No. 8 in the UK Singles Chart in November 1956.

Lowe earlier wrote "Gambler's Guitar", a million-selling hit for Rusty Draper in 1953. His most notable run as a disc jockey was with WNEW AM in New York, from 1964. Lowe also worked at WNBC AM in New York where he was heard both locally and on the coast-to-coast NBC Radio weekend program Monitor.

He retired in 2004 at the age of 81, and lived in Southampton, New York. For contributions to the music industry, Lowe was honored with a star on the Hollywood Walk of Fame at 6341 Hollywood Boulevard.

Lowe died on December 12, 2016, at his home in East Hampton, Long Island, after a long illness.

== Discography ==
=== Singles ===
Year	Single (A-side, B-side) Both sides from same album except where indicated	US	R&B	US Country	Album
1953	"Gambler's Guitar" b/w "The Martins and The Coys"	-	-	-	The Door Of Fame
1953	"Look In Both Directions" b/w "Santa Claus Rides A Strawberry Roan" (Non-album track)	-	-	-	The Door Of Fame
1954	"Pretty Fickle Darlin'" b/w "Go and Leave Me"	-	-	-	The Door Of Fame
1954	"River Boat" b/w "Goodbye Little Sweetheart"	-	-	-	The Door Of Fame
1955	"Close The Door" b/w "Nuevo Laredo" (Non-album track)	27	-	-	Songs They Sing Behind The Green Door
1955	"Maybellene" b/w "Rene LaRue" (from Wicked Women)	-	13	-	Non-album tracks
1955	"John Jacob Jingleheimer Smith" b/w "St. James Avenue"	-	-	-	Non-album tracks
1956	"Blue Suede Shoes" b/w "(Love Is) The $64,000 Question"	-	-	-	Non-album tracks
1956	"The Green Door" b/w "(The Story Of) The Little Man In Chinatown" (Non-album track)	1	5	-	Songs They Sing Behind The Green Door
1956	"Prince Of Peace" b/w "Santa Claus Rides A Strawberry Roan" (Non-album track)	-	-	-	The Door Of Fame
1956	"The Martins and The Coys" b/w "The Golden Goose Is Dead"	-	-	-	The Door Of Fame
1957	"By You, By You, By You" /	43	-	-	Non-album tracks
1957	"I Feel The Beat"	84	-	-	Non-album tracks
1957	"Four Walls" /	15	-	-	Non-album tracks
1957	"Talkin' To The Blues"	15	-	8	Non-album tracks
1957	"From A Jack To A King" b/w "Slow Train"	-	-	-	Non-album tracks
1957	"The Bright Light" b/w "Rock-A-Chicka"	-	-	-	Non-album tracks
1958	"The Lady From Johannesburg" b/w "Kewpie Doll"	-	-	-	Non-album tracks
1958	"Take Us To Your President" b/w "Later On Tonight"	-	-	-	Non-album tracks
1958	"Ja Ja Ja" b/w "Chapel Bells On Chapel Hill"	-	-	-	Non-album tracks
1958	"Play Number Theven" b/w "Come Away From His Arms"	-	-	-	Non-album tracks
1959	"Without You" b/w "I'm Movin' On"	-	-	-	Non-album tracks
1960	"He'll Have to Go" b/w "(This Life Is Just A) Dress Rehearsal"	-	-	-	Non-album tracks
1960	"The Midnight Ride Of Paul Revere" b/w "The Tomorrow That Never Came"	-	-	-	Non-album tracks
1960	"Man Of The Cloth" b/w "Someone Else's Arms"	-	-	-	Non-album tracks
1961	"That Do Make It Nice" b/w "Two Sides To Every Story"	-	-	-	Non-album tracks
1963	"Hootenanny Granny" b/w "These Bones Gonna Rise Again"	103	-	-	Non-album tracks
1964	"Addis Ababa" b/w "Have You Ever Been Lonely"	-	-	-	Non-album tracks
1965	"Mr. Moses" b/w "Make Your Back Strong"	-	-	-	Non-album tracks
1967	"Blotsen Botten" b/w "Gambler's Guitar"	-	-	-	Non-album tracks
1968	"Michael J. Pollard For President" b/w "The Ol' Race Track"	-	-	-	Non-album tracks
1973	"Green Door" (Re-recorded version) b/w "San Francisco Bay"; Featuring Teresa Brewer on background vocals	-	-	-	Non-album tracks
