= Hot Dog (song) =

1956 song by Buck Owens

Single by Corky Jones
- B-side: "Rhythm and Booze"
- Released: September 1956
- Recorded: c. Spring 1956
- Studio: Lu-Tal Recording Studio, Bakersfield, California
- Genre: Rockabilly
- Length: 2:15
- Label: Pep
- Songwriters: Buck Owens; Denny Dedmon
- Producer: Buck Owens

Corky Jones singles chronology
"Right After the Dance" (1956)	"Hot Dog" (1956)	"I'd Rather Have You" (1957)

"Hot Dog" is a rockabilly song by country singer Buck Owens, initially released under the pseudonym Corky Jones in September 1956 by independent Californian country label Pep.

== Background and release ==
Wanting to stretch himself musically and influenced by the likes of Elvis Presley and Gene Vincent, Owens wrote and recorded the rockabilly songs "Hot Dog" and "Rhythm and Booze". Not wanting to upset his country fans or for its release to affect his aspiring country career, Owens released the single under the pseudonym Corky Jones. The single was commercially successful locally, but did not get any further due to lacking in national distribution.

In 1961, the single was re-released by Tennessee label New Star as Buck Owens with overdubbed additional instrumentation. The original Pep record was also reissued in 1975. In 1988, Owens re-recorded "Hot Dog" for his album of same name, and it was released as a single by Capitol Records on 28 September that year, upon which it charted at number 46 on the Billboard Country chart.

== Personnel ==
Original recording:

- Buck Owens – vocals, producer
- Roy Nichols – guitar
- Fuzzy Owen – bass guitar
- Lawrence Williams (possibly) – piano
- Ray Heath – drums
- Red Butler – percussion

1988 re-recording:

- Buck Owens – vocals
- Terry Christofferson – lead guitar, steel guitar
- Doyle Singer – rhythm guitar
- John Herrell – rhythm guitar
- Jim Shaw – piano, harmony vocals, producer
- Dusty Wakeman – bass guitar, backing vocals
- Jim McCarty – drums
- Charlie Paakkari – backing vocals

== Charts ==
=== Weekly charts ===
Chart (1988)	Peak position
US Hot Country Songs (Billboard)	46

== Shakin' Stevens version ==
"Hot Dog"
- Cover of the single released in the Netherlands

Single by Shakin' Stevens

from the album Take One!
- B-side: "Apron Strings"
- Released: 4 January 1980
- Recorded: 1979
- Studio: Eden Studios, London
- Genre: Rock and roll
- Length: 2:48
- Label: Epic
- Songwriters: Buck Owens; Denny Dedmon
- Producer: Mike Hurst

Shakin' Stevens singles chronology
"Spooky" (1979)	"Hot Dog" (1980)	"Hey Mae" (1980)

Welsh rock and roll singer Shakin' Stevens released a cover of the song in January 1980 as the only single from his album Take One!. It became his first UK hit, peaking at number 24 on the Singles Chart.

=== Release ===
Despite being release at the beginning of January, the single did not enter the UK Singles Chart until the second week of February. It stayed in the charts for nine weeks, reaching its peak on the third week of March. The success of the single led Take One! to enter the Album Charts and peak at number 62.

The B-side "Apron Strings" is a cover of the song written by George David Weiss and Aaron Schroeder, first released by David Hess in 1959 under the name Billy the Kid. However, the B-side of the single released in New Zealand was a cover of Smiley Lewis' "Shame, Shame, Shame", written by Kenyon Hopkins and Ruby Fisher (the record miscredits the song to Bob Geddins and Jimmy McCracklin who wrote a different song of same name).

=== Reception ===
Reviewing the song for Record Mirror, Robin Smith wrote "One more from the lumbering rock 'n' roll mastodon that refuses to die. Off we go with cats and chicks gathering round the hot dog stand of a summer's evening. The sort of thing you've heard time and lime before, and will no doubt be tortured with time and time again."

=== Track listings ===
7"

1. "Hot Dog" – 2:48
2. "Apron Strings" – 3:06

7" (New Zealand)

1. "Hot Dog" – 2:48
2. "Shame, Shame, Shame" – 2:09

=== Charts ===
Chart (1980)	Peak position
UK Singles (Official Charts)	24

== Other cover versions ==
- In 1975, Ray Campi covered the song on his album Rockabilly Lives!
- In 2001, Rosie Flores covered the song on her album Speed of Sound
