= Park Hall, Washington County, Maryland =

Unincorporated community in Maryland, United States

Park Hall, Maryland
- Unincorporated community
- Location within Maryland
- Coordinates: 39°27′18″N 77°38′51″W
- Country: United States
- State: Maryland
- County: Washington
- Elevation: 718 ft (219 m)
- Time zone: UTC-5 (Eastern (EST))
  - Summer (DST): UTC-4 (EDT)
- Area codes: 240 & 301
- GNIS feature ID: 590969

Park Hall is an unincorporated community in Washington County, Maryland, United States. Park Hall is located 3.5 miles (5.6 km) southeast of Keedysville.

== History ==
Park Hall is a geographical place name for a largely undeveloped rural area on the western slope of South Mountain in southeastern Washington county Maryland. Originating in 1731, it was the name chosen by owner William Parks for the very first land tract awarded by the colonial government of Maryland in the region west of South Mountain. The property surveyed for 1,550 acres stretched along the lower west slope encompassing what was an early trail into the region. That trail used today's Crampton's Gap (which would remain a packhorse trail until the 1770s) and was linked to the lower Monocacy River crossing and Washington D.C. region. This trail was known by various period names, including Israel Friend's Road. The primary road would later be developed through neighboring Fox's Gap and finally moved again to Turner's Gap in 1758. All three routes over the mountain would remain important though, as evidenced by the battle's fought to control these three gaps in September 1862.
