= Thurston Harris =

American musician (1931–1990)

- Born: July 11, 1931; Indianapolis, Indiana, U.S.
- Died: April 14, 1990 (aged 58) Pomona, California, U.S.
- Genres: Rhythm and blues, Rock And Roll
- Occupations: Singer, songwriter
- Years active: 1951–1990
- Formerly of: The Sharps

Thurston Harris (July 11, 1931 – April 14, 1990) was an American singer and songwriter, best known for his 1957 hit "Little Bitty Pretty One".

== Career ==
Harris first appeared on record in 1953. He was the vocalist for South Central Los Angeles R&B band the Lamplighters. He remained with the band as it evolved through several name changes, from the Tenderfoots to the Sharps. In 1954, the Lamplighters appeared at the Tenth Cavalcade of Jazz concert at Wrigley Field in Los Angeles produced by Leon Hefflin Sr. alongside Count Basie, Louis Jordon, the Flairs, Perez Prado, Christine Kittrell, and Ruth Brown.

In 1957, Harris signed as a solo artist for Aladdin Records. His former band backed him when he released his version of Bobby Day's "Little Bitty Pretty One". It reached number 6 on the U.S. Billboard Hot 100. The track sold over one million records, achieving gold disc status. The Sharps would go on to another name change to become The Rivingtons, achieving fame with the single "Papa-Oom-Mow-Mow".

Unusually, "Little Bitty Pretty One" was released on labels of three different colors: purple, blue and maroon. The song appeared on the soundtracks to films or television dramas, such as Telling Lies in America, Matilda, Lipstick on Your Collar, and Christine.

Harris had a second and final hit in 1958 with "Do What You Did", which reached the Top 20. His other best known song was "Runk Bunk", recorded in 1959 (Aladdin 3452). Harris later recorded on Cub, Dot, Imperial, Intro, Reprise and United Artists.

== Death ==
Harris died in his sleep of a heart attack on April 14, 1990.

== Cover versions ==
- Frankie Lymon's highest charting solo hit was a cover of "Little Bitty Pretty One", which peaked at number 58 on the US Billboard R&B chart in 1960.
- The Jackson 5 covered "Little Bitty Pretty One" on their 1972 album Lookin' Through the Windows.
- UK 1980's star Shakin' Stevens covered the wild rocker "Do What You Did" on his album, Take One!, in 1980.
- A cover of "Runk Bunk" was one of the first songs recorded by the UK pop star Adam Faith.
- The Dave Clark 5 had a UK number 24 hit with "Little Bitty Pretty One" in 1965.
