= Mickey Gee =

- Born: Michael Richard Gee; 3 July 1944; Cardiff, Wales
- Died: 21 January 2009 (aged 64) Cardiff, Wales
- Genres: Rock and roll; rockabilly
- Instrument: Guitar
- Years active: 1960s–2008
- Formerly of: Shakin' Stevens' backing band

Michael Richard Gee (3 July 1944 – 21 January 2009) was a rock and roll guitarist who played alongside some of the most prominent Welsh musicians of the last forty years.

He died on 21 January 2009 in Cardiff, Wales, from emphysema.

== Career ==
Born at 13 Garth Street, Cardiff, Gee's early influences were Scotty Moore and Chet Atkins and, aged 18, he went to Nashville and Memphis, but failed to meet his heroes. He worked in New York, on a working visa, but quickly left when he received draft papers for the US Army. Early in his career Gee was the musical director of The Senators, Tom Jones' backing band when he was still known as Tommy Scott, and subsequently The Squires. Gee left and joined Joe Cocker's Grease Band.

Later in the 1960s, he played alongside Dave Edmunds and close friend, bassist John David Williams, in the band Human Beans. His relationship with Edmunds continued for many years playing on several of his records, most notably on his multi-million selling number one single "I Hear You Knocking" in 1970.

Mickey also teamed up with drummer Rob (Congo) Jones and bassist/vocalist Eddie Williams to form the band Arthur Mellow in the 1960s. This trio produced some outstanding music and were highly thought of by fellow musicians. Congo went on to work with Dave Edmunds in Love Sculpture, spent time with Sassafras and toured with Budgie.

During the 1980s, Gee became a member of Shakin' Stevens' backing band adding lead guitar to the number one singles This Ole House, Green Door and Oh Julie (a relationship that dated back to a brief stint in Shaky's earlier backing band The Sunsets in 1971).

Gee's distinctive playing style was much in demand during the 1980s. Gee's band Memphis Bend regularly supported Carl Perkins on UK tours which led to Gee becoming part of Carl Perkins' star studded backing band in 1985, which, along with Edmunds, also included George Harrison, Ringo Starr and Eric Clapton for his Blue Suede Shoes: A Rockabilly Session. During the same year, Gee was involved in Bill Wyman's Willie and the Poor Boys project which also featured Charlie Watts and Jimmy Page.

Gee provided the soundtrack of the 1997 film Twin Town, and was still regularly performing until shortly before his death from emphysema at Cardiff's University Hospital of Wales in January 2009.

== Selected discography ==
- Tom Jones and the Squires - On Stage (1965)
- Dave Edmunds – "I Hear You Knocking" (1970)
- Shakin' Stevens and the Sunsets – I'm No J.D. (1971)
- Dave Edmunds – Subtle as a Flying Mallet (1975)
- Geraint Watkins and the Dominators – Geraint Watkins and the Dominators (1979)
- Andy Fairweather Low – Mega Shebang (1980)
- Shakin' Stevens – Marie, Marie/This Ole House (1980)
- Dave Edmunds – Twangin... (1981)
- Shakin' Stevens – Shaky (1981)
- Dave Edmunds – D.E. 7th (1982)
- Shakin' Stevens – Give Me Your Heart Tonight (1982)
- Ted Herold - Ready Teddy (1982) (At the songs "Cool wie Humphrey Bogart", "Ready "Teddy & "Alte Liebe rostet nicht")
- Phil Everly and Cliff Richard – "She Means Nothing to Me" (1983), on Phil Everly (self-titled album, 1983) and Richard's The Rock Connection (1984)
- Willie and the Poor Boys – Willie and the Poor Boys (1985)
- Carl Perkins & Friends – Blue Suede Shoes: A Rockabilly Session (1986)
- Nick Lowe – Pinker and Prouder than Previous (1988)
- Shakin' Stevens – Merry Christmas Everyone (1991)
