= Shakin' Stevens and the Sunsets =

Welsh rock band

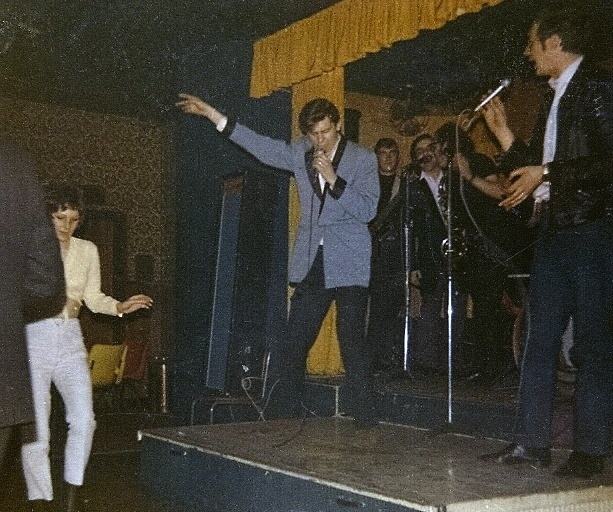
- Shakin' Stevens and the Sunsets performing in 1974

Background information
- Origin: Wales
- Genres: Rockabilly; rock and roll
- Years active: 1969–1977; 1977 - present (as The Sunsets)
- Labels: Parlophone, CBS, Polydor, Contour, Emerald, Pink Elephant, Decca, Skydog, Dynamite, Mooncrest
- Spinoff of: Shakin' Stevens; The Sunsets
- Past members: Shakin' Stevens; Paul Barrett; Robert "Rockin' Louie" Llewellyn; Ace Skudder; Mike Bibby; Willie Blackmore; Tony Britnell; Anglin Buttimore; George Chick; Johnny Chop; Paul Dolan; Mickey Gee; Dave Goddard; Trevor Hawkins; Mike Lloyd Jones; Alan Langford; Ian Lawrence; Steve Percy; Carl Petersen; Sid Petherick; Malcolm Preest; Stephen Pryor; Danny Wild; Brian Williams; Gareth Webb; Jim Hayes

Shakin' Stevens and the Sunsets were a Welsh rock band formed in Cardiff in 1969. They released several records and toured throughout the 1970s and their lead singer Shakin' Stevens went on to become a successful solo artist in the 1980s. A version of the Sunsets, containing original members, still tours annually in the UK, Europe and Australia.

== History ==
=== Early years ===
Shakin' Stevens and the Sunsets evolved from the rock and roll scene in and around Cardiff. One of its leading lights since the late 1950s was the Backbeats, a band fronted by Robert Llewellyn (who performed under the name of Rockin' Louie) and managed by Paul 'Legs' Barrett, a local entrepreneur and "card-carrying Communist".

Michael Barratt, Shakin Steven's birth name, was a fan of the group, and used to approach Louie for singing and dancing tips and, soon enough, Michael was being referred to as 'Rockin' Louie II'. By the mid 1960s however, Michael had formed his own band. Originally named the Olympics, then the Cossacks, they finally decided to call themselves the Denims, by which point they found themselves as a support act to Michael's heroes, the Backbeats. Eventually, when the Denims fell apart, Barratt formed a new group named the Rebels. It was this outfit that Paul Barrett came to see after a recommendation early in 1969. Although unimpressed with the band itself, Barrett saw something in their young singer who, only a few years earlier, had been hanging around looking for ideas from the Backbeats. He offered to manage Barratt on two conditions: firstly, he would have to ditch his group and, secondly, he must find himself an exciting new stage name. Agreeing to both suggestions, Barratt left the Rebels and then, inspired either by the memory of an old school friend playing bat and ball or maybe even an eccentric local roadsweeper, became Shakin' Stevens.

Deciding that the group would be named Shakin' Stevens and the Sunsets, Paul Barrett set about assembling a backing band for his new protege. Several musicians passed through the ranks of the Sunsets during these early days. There was a transitional period as the Backbeats evolved into the Sunsets which saw Dave Goddard and Sid Petherick briefly retained from the old band on bass and lead guitar respectively. Then, after two short lived guitarists by the names of Alan Langford and Mike Bibby, the band finally settled upon Carl Petersen. Early bass player Stephen Prior was soon replaced by Steve Percy, while the original drummer Brian Williams was replaced after Paul Barrett had managed to persuade former Backbeats frontman Rockin' Louie to hammer out a rhythm for the Sunsets. On saxophone was Paul Dolan (actually a guitarist who was a veteran of the Cardiff music scene for many years), and this early line-up was completed by London born Trevor Hawkins on piano, who had offered his services when the formative band played a gig at the Northcote Arms in Southall.

As a hardcore rock and roll fan, Paul Barrett was both surprised and amused at John Lennon's appearance at a rock and roll revival show in Toronto in September 1969 and promptly wrote a letter to the music press inviting Lennon to audition for the Sunsets. The offer may have escaped the Beatle's attention, but it was enough for the Rolling Stones management to offer the group a support slot at their forthcoming show at the Saville Theatre in London on 14 December. The resultant gig suggested that Shakin' Stevens and the Sunsets were not quite ready for the big time. A nervous Shaky was disconcerted at having to use Mick Jagger's PA system and, when realising he had left his drumsticks back in Cardiff, Louie had to borrow a pair from Charlie Watts. On discovering his snare stand was also missing, he resorted to resting the drum on an upturned fire bucket.

=== False dawns ===
The Rolling Stones gig soon proved to be the first of many false dawns for Shakin' Stevens and the Sunsets. After a few low key dates around Cardiff, 1970 saw the band returning to the Northcote Arms in London. Among the crowd during one of these gigs was the Radio 1 DJ John Peel, who wrote a generous review of the experience for his column in the weekly music paper Disc. He was so impressed with the Sunsets that he even offered the group a record deal with his Dandelion label. With John Peel as producer, the group recorded a number of tracks which Paul Barrett, and some members of the Sunsets, felt were not quite up to scratch. Peel was keen to release the tracks on a 10" LP but the band were concerned that they were seen as nothing more than a novelty act and subsequent events were to distance the band from the radio personality.

Shortly after the Peel sessions, the band were rehearsing at a venue in Cardiff named the Drope when they happened to be overheard by local hero Dave Edmunds as he passed in his car on the way to his bass player John Williams' nearby house. As a member of the Raiders, Edmunds had been a performer on the same Cardiff circuit as the Backbeats in the late 50s and early 60s. Since then, however, he had gone on to greater things forming Love Sculpture who had a top 5 hit in the UK with "Sabre Dance" in 1968. Recognising the ex-Backbeats and being suitably convinced by their performance, Dave offered to record Shakin' Stevens and the Sunsets at Rockfield Studios in Monmouth. With Edmunds promising to get the Sunsets signed to his current label Parlophone, this effectively put an end to the band's association with John Peel. Although a much more successful foray into the studio than the Dandelion tapes, the sessions were not without their problems. Remembering Rockin' Louie as a frontman from the Backbeat days, Dave Edmunds insisted Louie sang lead vocals on several of the tracks, much to Shaky's annoyance. One of Louie's vocals was for the Smiley Lewis song "I Hear You Knocking". Although it was, at the time, an unfamiliar song to Edmunds, he was inspired to record his own version later that same year.

As promised, Dave Edmunds got the band signed to Parlophone and the album A Legend was issued in October 1970. The album received some positive reviews, particularly for the authenticity of Edmunds' production which was full of 50s style slapback echo. Preceded in August by the single "Spirit Of Woodstock" (backed by the Big Al Downing and The Poe Kats Rockabilly rocker from the 1950s "Down On The Farm", which was sung by Louie and was Edmunds' preference for the A-side) the album sold poorly despite both sides of the single receiving some airplay. The Sunsets' fortunes began to deteriorate further when Dave Edmunds' own version of "I Hear You Knocking" was released as a single and began storming up the charts. When Parlophone had initially declined to release the song, Edmunds offered it to MAM Records instead. However, as soon as the record had reached number one in the UK and was on its way to selling five million copies, the EMI label claimed a breach of contract. The resulting backlash saw Shakin' Stevens and the Sunsets removed from the Parlophone roster.

Following the Parlophone disappointment, the band experienced a few personnel changes. After a drunken episode which saw him smash a full bottle of whisky over Shaky's head, bassist Steven Percy was asked to leave the Sunsets. Also, unhappy with being based in Cardiff, Trevor Hawkins decided to leave the group and return to London. Their replacements were bass player George Chick, who offered an exciting visual element with his wild stage performance, and Bristolian rock and roll pianist Mike 'Ace' Skudder, who was also no slouch when it came to entertaining an audience.

With the new line-up the band recorded a cover of Fats Domino's "All By Myself" for a compilation album called Battle Of The Bands. The producer on the session was Donny Marchand, an American now resident in the UK. Marchand promised the Sunsets that, with his connections in the music business, he could get them a contract with CBS Records. True to his word, CBS did indeed offer the band a deal and Marchand took the Sunsets into Morgan Studios in Willesden to record their second album, I'm No J.D., which was issued in the autumn of 1971. Halfway through the sessions, Carl Petersen left and the album was completed with the ace Welsh rock and roll guitarist Mickey Gee. Although he remained with the Sunsets to play a few gigs after the sessions had finished, his stay with the band was short lived. However, Mickey Gee was to perform a major role in Shakin' Stevens' success of the early 80s, adding his distinctive lead guitar to many of Shaky's biggest hit records. With CBS reportedly ignoring Donny Marchand's advice to release the album as a budget price record, I'm No J.D. sold, in Marchand's own words, "1,000 copies". Unsurprisingly, CBS dropped the band shortly after the album was released.

Early in 1972, the band were offered the chance to record another album with Donny Marchand for the budget label Contour, a subsidiary of Polydor. The Sunsets were reluctant to agree at first having yet to receive royalties from Marchand for I'm No J.D.. However, with the promise that the financial issues would soon be resolved, the band (with new guitarist Willie Blackmore) went into Majestic Studios in Clapham and rush recorded the album (along with the single "Sweet Little Rock And Roller") in one day. The Sunsets were disappointed with the results and yet again the record, named Rockin' And Shakin' , failed to sell.

Despite their lack of chart success, Shakin' Stevens and the Sunsets were still a popular live act enjoying regular and well attended gigs across the UK. They had developed a loyal and enthusiastic following, so much so that they were voted the 'Top British Rock And Roll Group (Of The Old School)' in NME's 1972 poll. Their reputation as a live act soon spread to Europe and the group embarked on a tour of Sweden in August 1972. By this point, the line-up had changed again with Ian Lawrence replacing Blackmore on guitar and Tony Britnall (previously with the Fortunes and Jigsaw) becoming the new sax player. Britnall was another showman to complement George Chick and Ace Skudder, not to mention the actual frontman Shakin' Stevens. The Sunsets had now grown into a formidable live act which was being lapped up by the Europeans who, unlike British audiences, had yet to tire of rock and roll music.

=== The Dutch years ===
A meeting in the autumn of 1972 with a Dutchman named Cyril Van Der Hemel convinced Paul Barrett that Shakin' Stevens and the Sunsets should forget about the unprofitable one-off record deals in Britain and should instead concentrate on the much more lucrative live circuit on the European continent. Van Der Hemel ran a production company named Tulip which focused on promoting British acts who had failed in their homeland. He promised the Sunsets professionally run tours in the Netherlands and other parts of Europe and a Dutch record contract which the band might actually be able to make some money out of. With nothing to lose, Shakin' Stevens and the Sunsets readily accepted the Tulip deal and, as a result, spent a large part of 1973 touring the Netherlands with a reasonable amount of success.

A record deal was struck with Dureco Records which resulted in the release (via the Pink Elephant label) of the album Shakin Stevens & Sunsets [sic] and the singles "Honey Honey" and "Spirit Of Woodstock" (a re-recording of their debut single). The Sunsets were considered successful enough in the Netherlands for them to be placed above Argent on the bill at that August's Emmen Festival, much to the disgust of the progressive rock giants who were something of a big deal in the UK at the time. The band were also beginning to enjoy some exposure on European TV, most notably a typically raucous performance on the German show Hits A Go Go. The album and "Honey Honey" single were eventually licensed to the Emerald Gem label for release in the UK but, perhaps predictably, both sunk without trace. It would be well over two years before Shakin' Stevens and the Sunsets were to release anymore records in Britain. Not that the Sunsets were short of gigs in the UK. One notable appearance around this time was at the 21st birthday party for Kenneth Tynan's daughter at the Young Vic theatre in London. Amongst the star studded crowd were Peter Sellers and Liza Minnelli as well as the Irish novelist Edna O'Brien who apparently took a keen interest in Shakin' Stevens, inviting him back to her Chelsea flat. The happily married Shaky only agreed on the proviso that he could bring the rest of the band with him.

Early 1974 saw yet more upheavals in the band's line-up as both Ian Lawrence and George Chick left the group to be replaced by Mike Lloyd Jones and Malcolm Preest on lead guitar and bass respectively. The irrepressible Tony Britnall also decided it was time to move on and chose to remain in the Netherlands, where he later become involved in the team behind the Stars on 45 phenomenon of the early 80s. In spite of the many British and European touring commitments, Shaky still found time to record a cover of Ricky Nelson's "Lonesome Town", although this time backed by Dureco session musicians rather than the Sunsets. Thanks in part to a prominent TV appearance, the single (still credited to Shakin' Stevens and the Sunsets) actually managed to reach the Dutch Top 20. Later during 1974, the Sunsets took advantage of a friend's offer to knock up some demos in his Dutch recording studio. Ironically, these rough recordings, including versions of "Tiger", "Silver Wings" and "Sugaree", were later licensed to numerous labels throughout the 1980s and would end up as probably the most widely distributed of all the music made by Shakin' Stevens and the Sunsets.

With Dureco requesting a new LP from the Sunsets, 1975 found Paul Barrett attempting to create a concept album exploring the relationship between the gangsters of the 1930s with the 'outlaw' music created by the rock and roll stars of the 1950s. Taking his lead from the notorious bank robber John Dilinger, Barrett named the album Manhattan Melodrama (a reference to the film Dillinger watched shortly before he was shot dead). However, yet again, the band felt they were not given the time to create the record they wanted and, once producer Schell Shelvekins had spent months overdubbing synthesizers and remixing the album to his satisfaction, the Sunsets had just about disowned the project. When the record was finally released later in 1975 (only in the Netherlands), even the sleeve failed to gain the band's appreciation: "I wouldn't have packaged potatoes in that cover", complained Paul Barrett.

With the Dureco agreement at an end, Paul Barrett struck a deal with Dutchman Pieter Meulenbroeks who owned the small Dynamite label. Finding themselves in the most basic of studio facilities the Sunsets produced their most authentic sounding rock and roll recordings since A Legend. The first fruits of these sessions were the five track "Frantic" EP which was only released at the time in France by the Skydog label. A rare UK release occurred in 1976 when the Phil Bailey-produced single "Jungle Rock" was issued on the Mooncrest label. Nobody was particularly surprised when the single flopped but, when Hank Mizell's original version was reissued weeks later and effortlessly made its way to number three in the UK singles chart (in a manner reminiscent of their 'near miss' with "I Hear You Knocking"), it seemed as if the Sunsets were fated to never make the big time. The Dynamite sessions produced more Dutch-only releases in a single ("You Mostest Girl"), EP ("Sexy Ways") and 10" album (C'mon Memphis) but these were to prove the final original releases by Shakin' Stevens and the Sunsets.

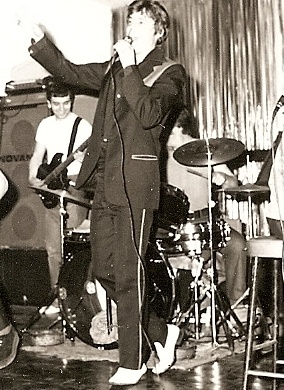
Shakin' Stevens in 1976

=== Beginning of the end ===
In the autumn of 1976 Phil Bailey (who had produced the "Jungle Rock" single) approached Track Records with a view to them signing a band he was managing named Rock Island Line. He persuaded Track's Danny Secunda and Mike Shaw to come and see Rock Island Line perform at Warwick University in a bill which also happened to include Shakin' Stevens and the Sunsets. By this point the Sunsets had Ian Lawrence back playing steel guitar alongside Mike Lloyd Jones, while George Chick had also returned to replace Mal Priest on bass. Clearly out-performing Rock Island Line, Track's scouts ignored Bailey's group and instead Danny Secunda invited Shakin' Stevens and the Sunsets to record two songs with him at Gooseberry Studios. Those songs, "Lightning Bar Blues" and "Lend Me Your Heart", remain unreleased but, according to Paul Barrett are amongst the best recordings the Sunsets ever made.

Despite their initial interest, Track seemed unsure of their next move. Should they try and attach the Sunsets to the emerging punk rock movement or should they just focus on making Shakin' Stevens a solo star and ditch his backing group? Track's indecision could not have been helped by the increasingly perilous financial state in which the label currently found itself. After another recording session with the Sunsets (this time produced by Charlie Gillett) Track decided on option number two and brought in Mike Hurst to produce a Shakin' Stevens solo single. The result, "Never" was released by Track in March 1977. Sensing which way the wind was blowing, George Chick, Ian Lawrence and Mike Lloyd Jones all left the Sunsets for good and formed a new band named Quarter Moon. Paul Barrett wasted no time in inviting ex-roadie Johnny Chop (real name Colin Hopkins) to take over bass and recruiting Danny Wild to play lead guitar. While Track offered Shaky a solo contract on the strength of "Never", Shakin' Stevens and the Sunsets were still regularly gigging as a unit, particularly in London at venues such as the Hope and Anchor, Islington and the Greyhound pub in Fulham.

In September, Track requested a video for Shaky's next single "Somebody Touched Me" single and it was during shooting at the Rock Garden in Covent Garden that Paul Barrett encountered the band Fumble. Contemporaries of the Sunsets on the rock and roll circuit, they informed Barrett that they had a landed a job as the in-house band for Jack Good's upcoming Elvis - The Musical. With three actors portraying the King, Barrett discovered that the role of the 'middle Elvis' was still up for grabs and immediately realised that Shaky was perfect for the part. While Shaky himself was initially uninterested, he eventually accepted the part after one of Jack Good's team, Annabel Leventon, came to watch him perform at the Greyhound with the Sunsets.

Paul Barrett was especially keen for Shaky to take the role, realising it was the chance of a lifetime for the singer. Even the rest of the Sunsets were happy for Shaky to take the part, despite the fact that it would most likely leave them without their front man for at least six months. The plan was for Rockin' Louie to take over as lead singer until Shaky was ready to return, by which point the band's profile would be boosted by having a leading West End star fronting the group. As it turned out, Shaky was never to return to the group and their gig at the Broom in Woolwich on 25 October 1977 turned out to be Shakin' Stevens and the Sunsets' last performance together.

=== Life after Shaky ===
As soon as Shaky began rehearsals for Elvis-The Musical, the Sunsets pressed on with their plan to have Rockin' Louie as their frontman. This worked fine until one evening at the Rock Garden (the same venue which had proved the catalyst in Shaky's change of fortune) when an audience became disappointed by the non-appearance of Shakin' Stevens as well as the crazy pianist Ace Skudder, who inexplicably failed to turn up for the gig. The venue's management apparently used this as a reason to negotiate a rebate from Paul Barrett, a suggestion which nearly ended in a violent confrontation. Barrett washed his hands of the group shortly after. While Skudder appeared on Shakin' Stevens' self titled solo album for Track (released shortly before the label went bust), The Sunsets persisted for a few more years before Louie left and re-formed the Backbeats with Sid Petherick and Dave Goddard.

By the early 1980s, after signing to Epic Records, Shakin' Stevens finally found chart success, enjoying the first of four UK number one singles in 1981 with "This Ole House" and eventually becoming one of the most successful acts of the 1980s. This unexpected popularity led to an interest in Shaky's back catalogue. EMI had already reissued A Legend in 1979 as a result of his appearance in Elvis-The Musical and decided to re-release it again in 1981 on their budget MFP label. Both I'm No J.D. and Rockin' And Shakin' were reissued by Pickwick in new sleeves with up to date pictures of Shaky and both were confusingly titled Shakin' Stevens and the Sunsets. The reissue of I'm No J.D. even earned a respectable placing in the album charts (although apparently without resulting in any royalty payments to the Sunsets). The Dutch recordings (many issued in the UK for the first time) were re-released by a variety of labels such as Mint and Magnum Force. The most readily available of the Sunsets recordings seemed to be those hastily recorded Dutch demos from 1974, which Phil Bailey had managed to get hold of and licence to as many budget labels in Europe as he could contact. Some of these releases included new recordings featuring Rockin' Louie and even Paul Barrett on vocals and had nothing whatsoever to do with Shakin' Stevens, despite his now immediately recognisable image being prominently displayed on the front cover.

As late as 1993, long after the rush of interest in Shaky's history had subsided, Paul Barrett's sense of injustice at monies owed still persisted. As a result, Shakin' Stevens found himself in Cardiff High Court alongside Dave Edmunds facing charges of non-payment of royalties from former Sunsets Rockin' Louie, Carl Petersen, Steve Percy and Paul Dolan. The prosecution claimed that the former band members were due a share of royalties which Shaky and his management had received from the reissue of A Legend in the early eighties. The judge agreed and, while the unpaid royalties only amounted to around £70,000 to be divided amongst all of them, the court costs ended up costing Shaky and Dave Edmunds £500,000.

While Shaky was willing to call a truce after that court case, Paul Barrett was still seething from the non-payment of royalties from the I'm No J.D. and Rockin' And Shakin' albums. As a result, Barrett reissued both albums on a single CD in 2005 under the uncompromising title of How To Be Awarded Two Gold Records And Not Be Paid A Penny In Royalties, complete with sleeve notes inviting both Sony and Universal (who now officially owned the rights to the two records) to sue him if they believed their copyrights had been infringed. Neither label responded to Barrett's challenge.

After a period of several years away from the limelight, Shakin' Stevens enjoyed a resurgence in popularity thanks to his winning appearance in the 2005 hit UK TV show Hit Me, Baby, One More Time which led to his performance at the 2008 Glastonbury Festival. Meanwhile, a version of the Sunsets still exists to this day featuring ex-Backbeats bassist (and original Sunset) Dave Goddard alongside guitarist Lewis Clayton, pianist Neil 'Nutrocker' and drummer Buzz Baker. In recent years the Sunsets has been fronted by Shakin' Stevens' nephew, Levi Barratt.

Because of Steven's commercial success since the 1980s, many of the original records issued by him and the group are now collector's items. For example, their recording of "Honey Don't" (issued on CBS Records in Sweden, 1973) sold for more than £340 STG in 2013. Other records that have sold for over £100 include their Parlophone issued single "Spirit Of Wood Stock" and their debut album, A Legend.

== Discography ==
- 1970: A Legend
- 1971: I'm No J.D.
- 1972: Rockin' And Shakin'
- 1973: Shakin' Stevens & Sunsets
- 1975: Manhattan Melodrama
- 1977: C'mon Memphis
- 1975: "My Baby Died"
