= John Fred =

American musician (1941–2005)

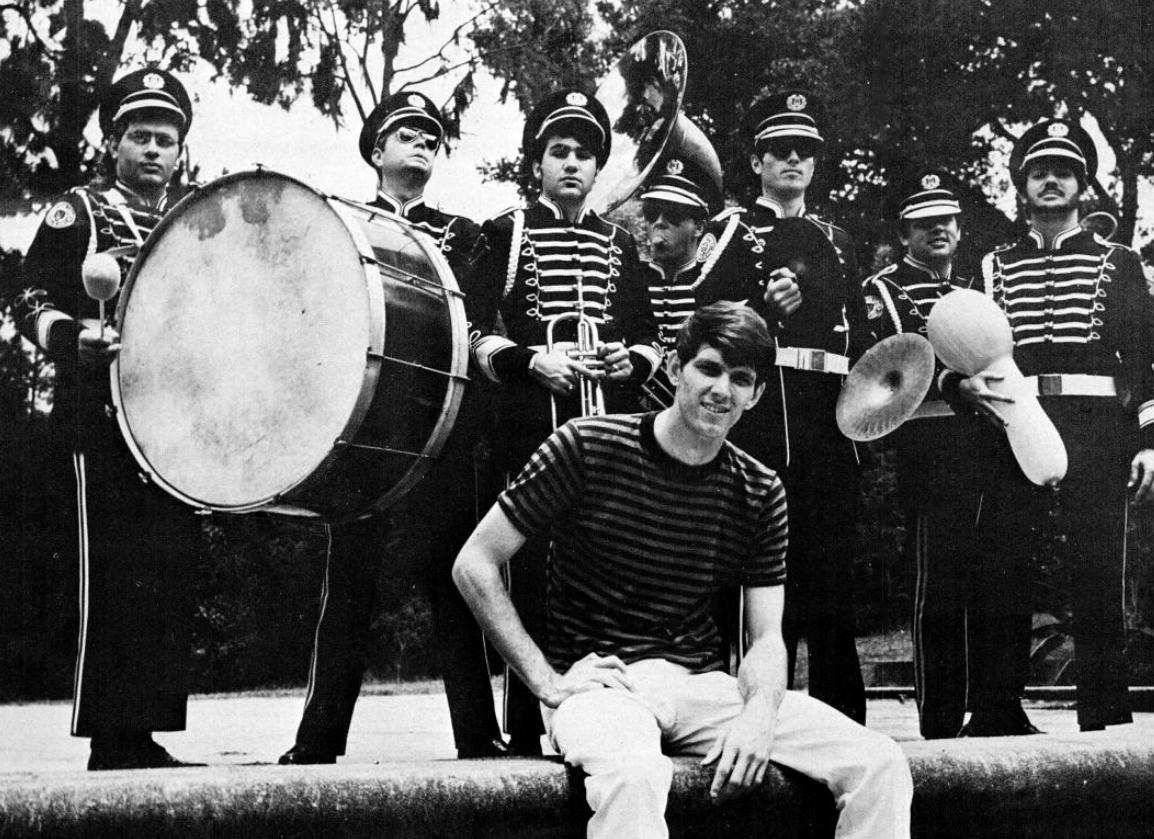
- John Fred and his Playboy Band in 1967

Background information
- Born: John Fred Gourrier; May 8, 1941; Baton Rouge, Louisiana, U.S.
- Died: April 15, 2005 (aged 63) New Orleans, Louisiana, U.S.
- Genres: Blue-eyed soul, swamp pop, bubblegum pop, rock and roll, R&B
- Occupations: Musician, singer-songwriter
- Instrument: Vocals
- Years active: 1956–2002
- Labels: Paula, Montell

John Fred Gourrier (May 8, 1941 – April 15, 2005), best known as simply John Fred, was an American musician from Baton Rouge, Louisiana. He was best known for the 1968 number-one single "Judy in Disguise (With Glasses)".

== Early life ==
John Fred Gourrier was born on May 8, 1941 in Baton Rouge, Louisiana, the son of John Fred Gourrier Sr. and Miriam Chaisson. He had two sisters, Ann Gourrier Kleinpeter and Kay Gourrier Begue; and one son, Kevin Morris Gourrier. Standing at six feet five inches tall, Gourrier played basketball for Catholic High School.

== Career ==
In 1956, at the age of fifteen, Gourrier formed the rhythm and blues band John Fred and the Playboys. Their first charting single was "Shirley", which featured instrumentation by Fats Domino's backing band. The track peaked at #82 on the Billboard Hot 100 in March 1959, leading to the Playboys appearing on Alan Freed's television show The Big Beat. However, Fred later turned down an invitation from Dick Clark to perform on American Bandstand due to his commitment to a high school basketball game. After a series of non-charting followup singles on the Montel label, the band split in 1961 when Fred attended college, where he lettered in basketball and baseball at Louisiana State University and Southeastern Louisiana University, winning two Gulf State Conference baseball championships with the latter in 1962 and 1963.

A new version of the band, John Fred and His Playboys, was formed in 1964, with two albums released under that name until it was changed to John Fred & His Playboy Band in order to avoid confusion with Gary Lewis & the Playboys. Fred and bandmate Andrew Bernard served as the group's primary songwriters, including their biggest hit, "Judy in Disguise (With Glasses)", (Note: Other band members co-wrote songs as well including Tommy Bryan, Lynwood "Lynn" Ourso, Ronnie Goodson, Howard Cowart, and John "Buddy" Chehardy.) whose name is a parodic play on the title of The Beatles' song "Lucy in the Sky with Diamonds". The song, issued by Louisiana-based Jewel Records on the Paula label, became successful, knocking "Hello, Goodbye", another Beatles song, out of the No. 1 chart position on the Billboard Hot 100 for two weeks in January 1968. It sold over one million copies, and was awarded a gold disc. With the success of the single, John Fred & His Playboy Band was branded as a novelty act and never had another major success. The follow-up single, "Hey, Hey, Bunny", peaked at No. 57 on the Billboard chart, and the band never again hit the Hot 100. Only after years of struggles did Fred obtain full legal rights to "Judy in Disguise" and its royalties.

== Later life and death ==
Gourrier continued to perform in bands, coached high school basketball and baseball, and remained a fixture at concerts and shows in his hometown. He produced records for other artists, including Irma Thomas and Fats Domino, and hosted a local radio show, The Roots of Rock 'n' Roll, on WBRH in Baton Rouge. He released several solo albums and one group effort, Louisiana Boys, with Joe Stampley and G. G. Shinn. He also wrote and produced radio commercials and jingles, earning two Clio Awards.

Gourrier received a kidney transplant in 2004, but complications thereafter resulted in repeated stays at Tulane Hospital in New Orleans. He died on April 15, 2005 at age 63, survived by his wife Sandra, son Kevin, daughter-in-law Jodi, and grandson Jon Sterling Gourrier.

== Awards ==
In 1999, Gourrier received the Louisiana Hall of Fame Living Legend Award, and in 2007 was the first artist inducted into the Louisiana Music Hall of Fame. Later, he was appointed to serve on the Louisiana Music Commission. He was also inducted into the Louisiana Blues Hall of Fame and the Delta Music Hall of Fame.

== Discography ==
=== Studio albums ===
| Year | Album | Billboard 200 | Record label | Notes |
|---|---|---|---|---|
| 1966 | John Fred and His Playboys | -- | Paula | |
| 1967 | 34:40 of John Fred and His Playboys | — | Paula | |
| 1967 | Agnes English | 154 | Paula | Reissued as Judy in Disguise With Glasses with same tracklist |
| 1969 | Permanently Stated | — | Paula | |
| 1970 | Love My Soul | -- | Uni | |
| 1977 | Juke Box | -- | Guinness | |
| 1993 | Louisiana Boys | — | Bayou Music | As The Louisiana Boys |
| 1999 | I Miss Y'all: The Unreleased Masters | — | Club Louisianne CDCL | |
| 2002 | Somebody's Knockin' | – | TJ Records | |
| 2016 | Roots Rockin' Blues | — | CD Baby | Posthumous release As the Louisiana Riverfront Band |

=== Compilation albums ===
| Year | Album | Billboard 200 | Record label |
|---|---|---|---|
| 1984 | The Best of John Fred and the Playboys | — | Sugarcane |
| 1991 | The History of John Fred and the Playboys | — | Paula |
| 2001 | ...With Glasses - The Very Best of John Fred and His Playboy Band: The Jewel and Paula Recordings 1964-69 | — | Fuel |
| 2022 | Judy in Disguise with Glasses | — | Liberation Hall |

=== Singles ===
| Year | Song Titles (Songwriters) | Peak chart positions | | | | Label | Album |
| Year | Song Titles (Songwriters) | Billboard Hot 100 | Cashbox Top 100 | Record World | Canada CHUM/RPM | Label | Album |
|---|---|---|---|---|---|---|---|
| 1958 | "Shirley" (T. Bryan-J. Gourrier) b/w "My Love for You" (T. Bryan-J. Gourrier) | 82 | 78 | — | — | Montel SJM 1002 | — (Note: Included on The Best of John Fred and the Playboys compilation (Sugarcane Records, 1984).) (Note: Included on The History of John Fred and the Playboys compilation (Paula Records, 1991)) (Note: Included on John Fred & His Playboy Band – Anthologie 1958/1969 compilation (Magic Records, France, 2008).) — |
| 1959 | "Mirror, Mirror (On The Wall)" (Bryan-Montel-J. Gourrier) b/w "To Have and To Hold" (Bryan-Montel-J. Gourrier) | — | — | — | — | Montel SJM-2001 | — — |
| 1960 | "Good Lovin'" (Charles) b/w "You Know You Made Me Cry" (Smith-Caronna) | — | — | — | — | Montel 1007 (Note: Credited to John Fred.) | — — |
| 1961 | "Down in New Orleans" (Gourrier-Bryan) b/w "I Love You" (Gourrier-Bryan) | — | — | — | — | Montel M-X-904 | — — |
| 1964 | "My First Love" (Lynn Ourso) b/w "Boogie Children" (Note: Remake of John Lee Hooker's "Boogie Chillen'" combined with Frankie Lee Sims' "Walkin' With Frankie".) (Lynn Ourso) | — | — | — | — | N-Joy 1005 (Note: Bootleg exists with "Just Want to Make Love to You" b/w "Boogie Children".) | — John Fred and His Playboys |
| 1964 | "Dial 101 (Cause I Still Love You)" (Gourrier-Bryan) b/w "There Goes That Train" (R. McGee) | — | — | — | — | Jewel 730 | — — (Note: Included on With Glasses-The Very Best of John Fred and His Playboy Band compilation (Fuel 2000, 2009)) |
| 1964 | "You're Mad at Me" (L. Ourso) b/w "Lenne" (L. Ourso) | — | — | — | — | Jewel 736 | — — |
| 1964 | "My First Love" (Lynn Ourso) b/w "Boogie Children" (Lynn Ourso) | — | — | — | — | Jewel 737 (Note: Credited to The Playboys.) | — John Fred and His Playboys |
| 1965 | "Wrong To Me" (J. Fred-L. Ourso) b/w "How Can I Prove" (J. Fred-L. Ourso) | — | — | — | — | Jewel 743 (Note: Credited to John Fred (With The Playboys)) | — — |
| 1965 | "Making Love to You" (Note: Remake of Willie Dixon's "I Just Want to Make Love to You".) (Gourrier-Ourso-Hawkins) b/w "Fortune Teller" (Naomi Neville) | — | — | — | — | Paula 225 | — — |
| 1966 | "Sun City)" (Goodson-Cowart-Ourso) b/w "Can't I Get (A Word In)" (J. Fred-L. Ourso-H. Cowart) | — | — | — | — | Paula 234 | 34:40 of John Fred and His Playboys; John Fred and His Playboys |
| 1966 | "Doing The Best I Can" (Gourrier-Ourso-Hawkins) b/w "Leave Her Never" (Naomi Neville) | — | — | — | — | Paula 244 | 34:40 of John Fred and His Playboys |
| 1966 | "Outta My Head" (John Fred-C. Yost) b/w "Loves Come in Time" (Lynn Ourso) | — | — | — | — | Paula 247 | 34:40 of John Fred and His Playboys |
| 1967 | "Up and Down" (John Fred-A. Bernard) b/w "Wind Up Doll" (Cyril Vetter-John Fred) | — | 142 | — | — | Paula 259 | Agnes English — |
| 1967 | "Agnes English" (John Fred-A. Bernard) b/w "Sad Story" (John Fred-A. Bernard) | 125 | 126 | 108 | 4/89 | Paula 273 | Agnes English |
| 1967 | "Judy in Disguise (With Glasses)" (J. Fred-A. Bernard) b/w "When the Lights Go Out" (J. Fred-A. Bernard) | 1 (Note: Also No. 1 in Australia, Austria, Belgium, Germany, South Africa, and Switzerland; No. 3 in Canada, Ireland, Netherlands, Norway, Spain, and the United Kingdom.) | 1 | 1 | 31/3 | Paula 282 | Agnes English |
| 1967 | "Judy in Disguise (With Glasses)" (J. Fred-A. Bernard) b/w "No Letter Today" (J. Fred-A. Bernard) | | | | | Hip Pocket HP-25 (Note: 4" flexi-disc.) | Agnes English |
| 1968 | "Hey, Hey Bunny" (J. Fred-A. Bernard) b/w "No Letter Today" (J. Fred-A. Bernard) | 57 | 41 | 39 | 37/41 | Paula 294 | Permanently Stated |
| 1968 | "We Played Games" (J. Fred & A. Bernard) b/w "Lonely Are The Lonely" (J. Fred & A. Bernard) | 130 | 122 | 111 | — | Paula 303 | Permanently Stated |
| 1968 | "Little Dum Dum" (J. Fred, A. Bernard & R. Goodson) b/w "Tissue Paper" (J. Fred & A. Bernard) | — | — | — | — | Paula 310 | Permanently Stated |
| 1968 | "Sometimes You Just Can't Win" (R. Brians-K. Henderson) b/w "What Is Happiness" (J. Fred, A. Bernard & H. Cowart) | — | — | — | — | Paula 315 | Agnes English; Permanently Stated |
| 1968 | "Shirley" (J. Fred) b/w "High Heel Sneakers" (R. Higgenbotham) | — | — | — | — | Montel-Michelle M-998 (Note: A-side remixed with horn overdubs. B-side credited to The Playboy Band.) | — — |
| 1969 | "Silly Sarah Carter (Eating on a Moonpie)" (J. Fred-L. Ourso) b/w "Back in the U.S.S.R." (J. Lennon-P. McCartney) | — | — | — | — | Uni 55135 | — Love My Soul |
| 1969 | "Three Deep in a Feeling" (J. Fred-L. Ourso) b/w "Open Doors" (J. Fred-A. Bernard) | — | — | — | — | Uni 55160 | Love My Soul |
| 1969 | "Love My Soul" (J. Fred-A. Bernard) b/w "Julia Julia" (J. Fred-L. Ourso) | — | — | — | — | Uni 55187 | Love My Soul — |
| 1970 | "Where's Everybody Going" (J. Fred-L. Ourso) b/w "Miss Knocker" (J. Fred-A. Bernard) | — | — | — | — | Uni 55220 | Love My Soul — |
| 1973 | "I'm in Love Again"/"In The Mood" (A. Domino/Joe Garland-Andy Razaf) b/w "Bayou Country" (D.Bardwell-T. Veitch) | — | — | — | — | Bell 45.382 (Note: Both tracks credited to John Fred and the Creepers.) | — — |
| 1976 | "Hey Good Lookin'" (Hank Williams) b/w "Juke Box Shirley" (J. Gourrier-B. Chehardy) | — | — | — | — | Sugarcane VPUS-11/12 | Juke Box |
| 1984 | "Shirley" (T. Bryan-J. Gourrier) b/w "Harlem Shuffle" (R. Reif-E. Nelson) | — | — | — | — | Paula 445 | — — |
| 1984 | "Judy in Disguise (With Glasses)" (J. Fred-A. Bernard) b/w "Agnes English" (John Fred-A. Bernard) | — | — | — | — | Paula 447 (Note: Digitally remastered and remixed in stereo.) | Agnes English |
| 1988 | "Louisiana's Gonna Rise Again" (Chris Ballard, Margie Ballard, Daryl Speights) b/w Same (instrumental) | — | — | — | — | Straight Talk ST-101-A | — — |
| Reissues | "Judy in Disguise" "Mother in Law" (Ernie K-Doe) | — | — | — | — | Eric 303 | |
| Reissues | "Judy in Disguise (With Glasses)" "Hey, Hey, Bunny" | — | — | — | — | Collectables 3315 | |
| Reissues | "She's My Baby Doll" (The Tune Tones) "Shirley" | — | — | — | — | Louisianna L01 (Note: "Shirley" credited to The Playboys.) | |
| Reissues | "Judy in Disguise (With Glasses)" "Hold Back the Night" (The Trammps) | — | — | — | — | Ripete R45-182 | |
| Reissues | "Judy in Disguise" "Do You Want to Dance" (Bobby Freeman) | — | — | — | — | Rebound RB 228 | |
| Reissues | "Pushin' Too Hard" (The Seeds) "Judy In Disguise" | — | — | — | — | Trip TR65 | |

Discography notes
