= The Big Beat (TV program) =

American music and dance TV series (1957)

The Big Beat is an American music and dance television program broadcast on the ABC Network in 1957. It was hosted by Alan Freed, and subsequently by Richard Hayes. The program debuted on May 4, 1957, four months before American Bandstand, making it the United States' "first nationally-televised rock 'n roll dance show".

The Wall Street Journal summarized the end of the program as follows. "Four episodes into “The Big Beat,” Freed’s prime-time TV music series on ABC, the show was canceled after black singer Frankie Lymon was seen on TV dancing with a white audience member".

== History ==
The Big Beat was the first interracial teen show broadcast in New York City, debuting on May 4, 1957. The show was broadcast on Fridays from 10 to 10:30 p.m. Eastern Time. Guest stars included Connie Francis, the Everly Brothers, Don Rondo, Andy Williams, Chuck Berry, Bobby Darin, Fats Domino, Clyde McPhatter, Gogi Grant, and Jerry Lee Lewis.

On July 19, 1957, New York-based American Black teen singer Frankie Lymon was dancing with a white girl, causing the outrage with TV stations in the Southern states. A few weeks after the incident, the show was immediately cancelled after four episodes and the ABC executives were seen to have "buckled under the pressure."

Following the incident regarding interracial dance between Frankie Lymon and a white girl, Freed was often featured in magazines and newspapers which he wore bright scarlet tuxedos or outsized window-plaid sport coats punctuated with a wispy silk bow tie favored by Black or white hillbilly artists. Freed was fired from ABC, ostensibly as a result.

According to an American Bandstand producer to New York Post, the interracial dance between Frankie Lymon and a white girl "contributed to American Bandstand's segregation."

Freed was inducted along with Elvis Presley, Little Richard, Chuck Berry, and Jerry Lee Lewis into the Rock and Roll Hall of Fame "in its very first class" in 1986 because he promoted the interracial dance.
