= This Ole House =

Stuart Hamblen song

Single by Stuart Hamblen

from the album It Is No Secret
- B-side: "When My Lord Picks Up the 'Phone"
- Released: May 1954
- Recorded: 29 March 1954
- Studio: RCA Victor 24th Street, New York City
- Genre: Country
- Length: 2:55
- Label: RCA Victor
- Songwriter: Stuart Hamblen

"This Ole House" (sometimes spelled "This Old House") is an American popular song written by Stuart Hamblen, and published in 1954. Rosemary Clooney's version reached the top of the popular music charts in both the US and the UK in 1954. The song again topped the UK chart in 1981 in a recording by Shakin' Stevens.

== Stuart Hamblen version ==
Hamblen recorded the song in March 1954 and released it as a single in May 1954. It became very successful, peaking at number two on the Billboard Country & Western chart, as well as being a top-30 hit on the Hot 100, known then as the Best Sellers in Stores. It was his last hit on the country charts, and with the royalties, he bought the mansion that had been owned by the late Errol Flynn.

=== Composition ===
Hamblen was supposedly out on a hunting expedition in the Sierra with guide Monte Wolfe, when his fellow hunter, actor John Wayne, and he came across a hut in the mountains. Inside was the body of a man, and the man's dog was still there, guarding the building. This inspired Hamblen to write "This Ole House".

The song describes the last words of an old man living in an old house that has fallen into such disrepair that it is no longer structurally sound. The man tells of how the house "once knew his children" and "once knew his wife," but that he was not going to need it any longer, nor did he have time to repair the house's numerous flaws because he is dying and going to heaven very soon ("ready to meet the saints").

=== Reception ===
The single was reviewed twice in Billboard magazine. It was described as "a powerful religioso item with a message and an infectious beat. Hamblen sells it with fervor." and that it "could easily break thru into country and pop". In the following issue, it was described as "a sacred item which re-establishes Hamblen as the top man in his field" and "a sock debut for Hamblen on the label."

=== Charts ===
==== Weekly charts ====
Chart (1954)	Peak position
US Best Sellers in Stores (Billboard)	26
US Country & Western Records (Billboard)	2
US Cash Box Top 10 Country Best Sellers	3

==== Year-end charts ====
Chart (1954)	Position
US Country & Western Records (Billboard)	13

== Rosemary Clooney version ==
"This Ole House"

Single by Rosemary Clooney with Buddy Cole and His Orchestra
- A-side: "Hey There" (US)
- Released: June 1954 (US)
- Genre: Traditional pop
- Length: 2:18
- Label: Columbia (US); Philips (UK)
- Songwriter: Stuart Hamblen
- Producer: Mitch Miller

Rosemary Clooney with Buddy Cole and His Orchestra singles chronology
"Hey There" (1954)	"This Ole House" (1954)	"Sisters" (1954)

Soon after Hamblen released his version, Rosemary Clooney recorded a version of "This Ole House" with Buddy Cole and His Orchestra. It featured bass vocals by Thurl Ravenscroft and topped the charts in the US and the UK.

In the US, it was released as the flip side to "Hey There", which also reached number one. However, in the UK, it was released as the A-side, with the flip side "My Baby Sends Me".

When reviewed in Billboard, it was described as "a bright, bouncy rendition from the thrush, supported solidly by an unbilled male singer and the Buddy Cole ork. Tho not as strong as the flip. It has a sparkle that could make it grab juke loot." A version similar to the Clooney version was also recorded by UK singer Alma Cogan in 1954, but without chart success.

=== Track listings ===
7" (US)

1. "Hey There" – 2:57
2. "This Ole House" – 2:18

7" (UK)

1. "This Ole House"
2. "My Baby Sends Me"

=== Charts ===
==== Weekly charts ====
Chart (1954)	Peak position
UK Singles (Official Charts)	1
US Best Sellers in Stores (Billboard)	1
US Cash Box Best Selling Singles	3

==== Year-end charts ====
Chart (1954)	Position
US Best Sellers in Stores	12

== Shakin' Stevens version ==
"This Ole House"

Single by Shakin' Stevens

from the album This Ole House
- B-side: "Let Me Show You How"
- Released: 20 February 1981
- Recorded: 1980
- Studio: Eden Studios. London
- Genre: Rockabilly
- Length: 2:58
- Label: Epic
- Songwriter: Stuart Hamblen
- Producer: Stuart Colman

Shakin' Stevens singles chronology
"Shooting Gallery" (1980)	"This Ole House" (1981)	"You Drive Me Crazy" (1981)

In 1981, Welsh singer Shakin' Stevens covered NRBQ's arrangement of the song for his album of the same name. It became very successful, topping the UK Singles Chart for three weeks, as well as being a hit in several other countries. It was re-released in 2005 as a double A-side with a cover of Pink's "Trouble" after his appearance in the TV show Hit Me Baby One More Time and reached number 20 in the UK Singles Chart.

=== Charts ===
==== Weekly charts ====
Chart (1981)	Peak position
Australia (Kent Music Report)	1
Austria (Ö3 Austria Top 40)	8
Belgium (Ultratop 50 Flanders)	3
Canada Adult Contemporary (RPM)	17
Denmark (Hitlisten)	6
Finland (Suomen virallinen lista)	12
Germany (GfK)	5
Iceland (Vísir)	9
Ireland (IRMA)	1
Israel (IBA)	4
Netherlands (Dutch Top 40)	5
Netherlands (Single Top 100)	6
New Zealand (Recorded Music NZ)	3
South Africa (Springbok Radio)	1
Switzerland (Schweizer Hitparade)	4
UK Singles (Official Charts)	1
Zimbabwe (ZIMA)	19

Chart (2005)	Peak position
UK Singles (OCC)	20 (with "Trouble")

==== Year-end charts ====
Chart (1981)	Position
Australia (Kent Music Report)	11
Belgium (Ultratop Flanders)	26
Denmark (Hitlisten)	28
Germany (GfK Entertainment)	22
Netherlands (Dutch Top 40)	17
Netherlands (Single Top 100)	23
New Zealand (Recorded Music NZ)	5
South Africa (Springbok Radio)	4
UK Singles	4

=== Certifications and sales ===
Region	Certification	Certified units/sales
Australia (ARIA)	Platinum	100,000^{^}
United Kingdom (BPI)	Gold	500,000^{^}
^{^} Shipments figures based on certification alone.

== Other notable recordings ==
- 1954: Billie Anthony's version was a hit in the UK, peaking at number four in October.
- 1954: Bing Crosby recorded the song in 1954 for use on his radio show, and it was subsequently included on the CD Bing & Rosie: The Crosby-Clooney Radio Sessions (2010).
- 1960: Stoney and Wilma Lee Cooper released a version in 1960 which charted at No. 16 on the US Country chart.
- 1964: Per Myrberg recorded the song in Swedish as "Trettifyran", which was a hit in Sweden on the Svensktoppen music chart for 39 weeks.
- 1966: The Cathedral Quartet recorded the song on their album With Strings.
- 1966: The Statler Brothers recorded the song on their debut album Flowers on the Wall.
- 1987: The Cathedral Quartet re-recorded the song with "When the Saints Go Marching In" on their album Symphony of Praise.
- 1998: The Brian Setzer Orchestra on The Dirty Boogie.
- 2010: Ernie Haase and Signature Sound on their DVD/CD A Tribute to The Cathedral Quartet.
