= Rod Houison =

British music producer

Rodney Houison (born), is a British musician, producer, and sound engineer who has worked with The Who, Pete Townshend, Cliff Richard, Shakin' Stevens, Judge Dread, and Echo & the Bunnymen. He has worked with and is married to Miriam Stockley. Since Stockley joined the world/new age musical group, Aomusic, Houison has been the group's co-engineer.

Houison and Stockley have two children, Carly Houison and Leigh Brandon Houison. They live in Orlando, Florida.
