= Stuart Colman =

English musician, record producer and broadcaster

- Born: Ian Stuart Colman; 19 December 1944; Harrogate, Yorkshire, England
- Died: 19 April 2018 (aged 73) Cheltenham, Gloucestershire, England
- Genres: Pop
- Occupations: Musician, record producer, disc jockey
- Instrument: Bass guitar
- Years active: 1960s–2018
- Labels: Pye Records, Epic Records
- Formerly of: Pinkerton's Assorted Colours; The Flying Machine

Ian Stuart Colman (19 December 1944 – 19 April 2018) was an English musician, record producer and broadcaster. Allmusic noted that he "has an impressive catalogue as a record producer and much of Shakin' Stevens success can be attributed to Colman". Over the decades, Colman worked with a diverse array of musicians including Billy Fury, The Blasters, Cliff Richard, Phil Everly, Alvin Stardust, The Jets, The Inmates and Little Richard.

== Biography ==
Colman was born into a musical family, took up piano and bass guitar, and enjoyed his first taste of success when he joined Pinkerton's Assorted Colours in 1966. Three years later, the group evolved into The Flying Machine and their first single under that name, "Smile A Little Smile For Me", made the top five in the US Billboard Hot 100, By 12 December 1969, they had sold a million copies of the record, and it was awarded a gold disc by the R.I.A.A.

In 1976, Colman jointly organised a march to the BBC, protesting about the lack of rock and roll music on BBC Radio 1. To his surprise, the corporation took him on as a presenter, headlining his own weekly show. Following the popularity of the programme, Epic Records brought Colman in to take over the production of Shakin' Stevens. There were hits straight away with "Hot Dog" and "Marie, Marie" followed by a string of number ones including "This Old House", "Green Door" and "Oh Julie". During this period he was called upon to produce a wide range of artists, ranging from The Shadows to Paul Kennerley, and Claire Hamill to The Revillos. In 1982, Colman was voted the top singles producer of the year by Music Week magazine.

Meanwhile, as a broadcaster, Colman was also hosting Echoes on BBC Radio London, a unique forum with a guest list that included Paul McCartney, Dr. John, Robert Plant and Steve Miller. He was also in demand as a journalist writing a weekly column for the Melody Maker, as well as authoring a best-selling book, They Kept on Rockin'. Colman extended his chart successes by creating hits for Kim Wilde, The Jets and Alvin Stardust, and he made albums with his boyhood idols, Phil Everly and Little Richard. Following his love of comedy recordings, Colman was asked by Richard Curtis and Ben Elton to produce the inaugural Comic Relief record, and "Living Doll", featuring TV's The Young Ones along with Cliff Richard, became an international No. 1.

In 1986, Colman opened his own Master Rock recording studio in London, fitting the A room out with the first Focusrite recording console, and the B room with a state-of the-art Solid State Logic. Apart from his own productions with Jeff Beck, The Inmates and Jane Harrison, the studio played host to Elton John, U2, Eric Clapton and Soul II Soul. Still pursuing his broadcasting career, Colman then joined London's newly launched Capital Gold, where he played rock and roll at the weekends and anchored the evening slot during the week. At the same time he was producing many major TV music specials for Central Television, where he worked with Natalie Cole, T'Pau, Nona Hendryx and Meat Loaf.

In 1995, geared by his love of American music, Colman decided to move with his family to Nashville, Tennessee, where he went on to record with a wide variety of artists including Victoria Shaw, Nanci Griffith, The Crickets and Linda Gail Lewis. He began by arranging and producing the country demo of the Faith Hill smash "This Kiss", then co-produced with Jim Ed Norman the original version of the Garth and Trisha duet, "Where Your Road Leads" by Victoria Shaw and Billy Dean. He delivered a well-received Texas-Swing album by Don Walser for Sire Records, as well as producing a fresh batch of tracks on The Osmond Brothers, a country album by Canadian diva Tracy Fidler, and the debut recordings by Brazilian newcomer, Leandro Beling.

In 2002, Colman was diagnosed with cancer of the esophagus and he was subjected to an intense course of chemotherapy, radiation and surgery. Even so, during this time he wrote liner notes for many CD's including a boxed set of Don Gibson recordings for Bear Family. Following his recovery, Colman appeared in a movie depicting the life and times of Jack Clement, and also reunited with Shakin' Stevens playing bass on tours throughout Europe. Eventually Colman returned to the studios of Nashville where his energies were directed into developing a new set of artists. Then in the spring of 2009 he moved, this time to Manhattan where he married for the second time. Colman's later activity included pitching TV and film comedy scripts, product-managing CD compilations, and writing his long-running column for Now Dig This magazine, as well as a monthly blog for Collective Review. Most recent studio projects included a debut album from the Hull based band, Moskow, preliminary recordings with the Italian tenor, Roberto IaRussi, and a new single from the five-piece, Yannick.

In January 2014, Colman returned to the UK to run his business from the Cotswolds.

He died from cancer in a Cheltenham hospice on 19 April 2018 at the age of 73.
