= Eden Studios (recording facility) =

Former recording studio in London, England

Coordinates: 51°30′2″N 0°15′59″W

Eden Studios was a commercial recording facility in west London, England. It opened in 1967, originally at 11 Eden Street in Kingston upon Thames (now under the Eden Walk shopping centre), before moving to 20-24 Beaumont Road in Chiswick, in 1972. It was started by Philip Love, Mike Gardner, and Piers Ford-Crush. Love and Gardner owned the studio and worked there as financial and technical directors, respectively. Ford-Crush retired in 1998. The studio closed in July 2007, and the Chiswick site was demolished for housing.

Notable artists who have worked at Eden Studios include:

- Amaral
- Bay City Rollers
- John Cale
- Elvis Costello
- The Darkness
- Dubstar
- Elbow
- Girls Aloud
- Happy Mondays
- John Hiatt
- The Icarus Line
- Joe Jackson
- Jamelia
- Tom Jones
- Joy Division
- Kaiser Chiefs
- Kissing the Pink
- KT Tunstall
- Nigel Kennedy
- The Killers
- Kroke
- Nick Lowe
- Madness
- McFly
- George Michael
- Kylie Minogue
- Oasis
- The Ocean Blue
- Patti Smith (Gung Ho)
- Primal Scream
- Rockpile
- Sex Pistols
- The Sinceros
- The Smiths
- Shakin' Stevens
- Sugababes
- The Undertones
- The La's
