= Along Came Jones (album) =

Studio album by Tom Jones
- Released: 21 May 1965
- Recorded: 1964–65
- Studios: Decca, London
- Genres: Pop, blue-eyed soul
- Length: 43:27 (UK); 32:11 (US)
- Label: Decca
- Producer: Peter Sullivan

Tom Jones (Decca) chronology
Along Came Jones (1965)	What's New Pussycat? (1965)

Singles from Along Came Jones
- 1. "It’s Not Unusual" Released: 17 February 1965; 2. "Once Upon A Time" Released: 12 May 1965

Along Came Jones is the debut studio album recorded by Welsh-born singer Tom Jones, which includes his massive hit single "It's Not Unusual". Released in 1965, the album reached No. 11 on the UK Albums chart, where it stayed for a total of five weeks. Some of the record's tracks were covers while some were written specifically for Jones (like the Gordon Mills-penned "The Rose"). The album title is a possible reference to the song of the same name.

In June 1965, Parrot Records (in North America) issued an abridged, 12-track version of the album titled It's Not Unusual.

== UK Track listing ==
Side 1
No.	Title	Writer(s)	Length
1.	"I've Got a Heart"	Gordon Mills, Les Reed	2:33
2.	"It Takes a Worried Man"	Traditional; arranged by Gordon Mills	2:40
3.	"Skye Boat Song"	Traditional; arranged by Malcolm Lawson and Harold Boulton	2:59
4.	"Once Upon a Time"	Gordon Mills	2:07
5.	"Memphis, Tennessee"	Chuck Berry	2:40
6.	"Whatcha' Gonna Do"	Chuck Willis	3:07
7.	"I Need Your Lovin'"	Don Gardner, Bobby Robinson, Clarence Lewis, James McDougall	2:38
8.	"It's Not Unusual"	Gordon Mills, Les Reed	1:58

Side 2
No.	Title	Writer(s)	Length
9.	"Autumn Leaves"	Joseph Kosma, Johnny Mercer, Geoffrey Parsons, Jacques Prévert	3:08
10.	"The Rose — Version 2"	Gordon Mills	2:53
11.	"If You Need Me"	Wilson Pickett, Robert Bateman, Sonny Sanders	2:38
12.	"Some Other Guy"	Gordon Mills	2:31
13.	"Endlessly"	Brook Benton, Clyde Otis	3:19
14.	"It's Just a Matter of Time"	Clyde Otis, Brook Benton, Belford Hendricks	2:42
15.	"Spanish Harlem"	Jerry Leiber, Phil Spector	3:18
16.	"When the World was Beautiful"	Paul Kaufman, Jerry Harris	2:16

== US Track Listing (It's Not Unusual) ==
Side 1
No.	Title	Writer(s)	Length
1.	"It's Not Unusual"	Mills, Reed	1:58
2.	"Memphis, Tennessee"	Berry	2:40
3.	"I Need Your Loving"	Gardner	2:38
4.	"Whatcha Gonna Do"	Willis	3:07
5.	"Skye Boat Song"	Traditional	2:59
6.	"Worried Man"	Traditional	2:40

Side 2
No.	Title	Writer(s)	Length
7.	"Once Upon a Time"	Mills	2:07
8.	"Autumn Leaves"	Kosma, Mercer, Parsons, Prévert	3:08
9.	"It's Just a Matter of Time"	Otis, Benton, Hendricks	2:42
10.	"Spanish Harlem"	Leiber, Spector	3:18
11.	"If You Need Me"	Pickett, Bateman, Sanders	2:38
12.	"When the World Was Beautiful"	Kaufman, Harris	2:16

== Certifications ==
Region	Certification	Certified units/sales
United Kingdom (BPI)	Gold	100,000^{^}
^{^} Shipments figures based on certification alone.

== Personnel ==
- Peter Sullivan - producer
- Les Reed - musical director
- Bill Price - engineer
- John Beale - cover photography
