= Belford Hendricks =

- Also known as: Belford Cabell Hendricks; Belford Clifford Hendricks; Sinky Hendricks; Bill Henry
- Born: May 11, 1909; Evansville, Indiana
- Origin: New York
- Died: September 24, 1977 (aged 68)
- Genres: R&B, swing, blues, pop, country and western, soul
- Occupations: Musician, songwriter, producer
- Instrument: Piano
- Years active: 1930s–1960s
- Labels: Mercury, Columbia
- Spouse: Mae Etta Bean (divorced)

Belford Cabell "Sinky" Hendricks (May 11, 1909 – September 24, 1977) was an American composer, pianist, arranger, conductor and record producer. He used a variety of names, including Belford Hendricks, Belford Cabell Hendricks, Belford Clifford Hendricks, Sinky Hendricks, and Bill Henry.

Hendricks is primarily remembered as the co-composer of numerous soft-R&B songs of the 1950s, many in collaboration with Clyde Otis and Brook Benton, and as an accomplished arranger. His versatility allowed him to write in various styles, from big band swing for Count Basie, through blues ballads for Dinah Washington and Sarah Vaughan, R&B-influenced pop for Benton and country and western numbers for Nat King Cole and Al Martino, to early soul for Aretha Franklin. His most successful songs are "Looking Back" and "It's Just a Matter of Time", both co-written with Otis and Benton.

== Early life and education ==
Hendricks was born in Evansville, Indiana, United States, to Frank Hendricks and Melissa Belle (Logan) Hendricks. He had two siblings, Paul Lawrence and Dorothy Medesta. His love for music began when his father brought home a piano. Hendricks played piano and learned other instruments. In high school, he participated in band.

In 1924, Hendricks graduated from the town's then-segregated Douglass High School, later rebuilt and renamed Lincoln High School. After a few years working at local establishments, he enrolled at the Indiana State Teachers' College, now known as Indiana State University, in Terre Haute. Often diverted from his education for semesters at a time by a need to earn money, Hendricks graduated in 1935, having majored in science and music.

== Marriage and army service ==
Hendricks married Mae Etta Bean of North Vernon, Indiana, a classmate studying to become an elementary school teacher. After spending a year in Maryland, Bean returned to Indiana. They divorced in the 1940s. Bean died in the early 1960s.

In 1938 or 1939, Duke Ellington and his orchestra recorded, "I'll Come Back for More", which appears to be the first recorded song co-written by Hendricks. It was written with Ellington, Brick Fleagle, Oramay Riamond, Rex Stewart, and Bee Walker.

In 1942, Hendricks was drafted into the United States Army, serving in a medical unit. He was stationed in New York, Arizona and Hawaii. Hendricks contributed a song, "Marching Through Berlin" that was sung by Ethel Merman in the 1943 wartime movie, Stage Door Canteen. Jet magazine of the 1980s shows him accompanying popular singer Lena Horne.

After the war, Hendricks returned to Indiana to care for his aging parents. During this period, he co-hosted Toast and Coffee, one of the first interracial radio programs in the US, though most listeners were unaware he was black.

During this period, he became acquainted with Emma Clinton, a native of Texas, who worked for Jane Blaffer Owen, heir to the Humble Oil fortune (now known as Exxon-Mobil). The Owens family helped resettle the community of New Harmony, Indiana, north of Evansville, which fell into disrepair.

== New York years ==
Although he was middle-aged, Hendricks decided to move to New York to pursue a full-time musical career. He continued his musical education, studying composition and organ at New York University. He knew a member of the Count Basie Orchestra and being able to play most instruments, he was able to substitute for musicians when they were ill or went on vacation. During his early years in New York, Hendricks studied the math-based Schillinger Method of composition and arranging under Rudolph Schramm.

By the mid-1950s, he met Clyde Otis. In 1957, Otis accepted a job as the first black A&R man at Mercury Records and asked Hendricks to become his right-hand man.

== Washington and Benton ==
Soon after arriving in New York, Hendricks met Dinah Washington. They enjoyed several chart hits, the most enduring being "What a Difference a Day Makes", which reached number 4 in the US Billboard R&B chart and number 8 in the US pop charts in 1959. "Unforgettable" and "This Bitter Earth" are also notable hits. Hendricks arranged and conducted nearly 100 songs for Washington from February 1959 to January 1961.

Even more successful were the light-hearted duets which Hendricks arranged for Washington and Brook Benton in 1960. "Baby (You've Got What It Takes)" made number 1 in the United States R&B chart and number 5 in the pop charts, earning over $1 million, whilst "A Rockin' Good Way (to Mess Around and Fall in Love)" also made number 1 in the R&B chart and number 7 in the pop chart.

Hendricks co-wrote numerous songs with Benton, often together with Otis. The Hendricks-Otis-Benton composition "It's Just a Matter of Time", arranged by Hendricks and performed by Benton, went to number 3 in the pop chart in 1959 and became a country music standard, with new interpretations reaching number 1 in the United States country charts twice: first in 1970, sung by Sonny James, and again in 1989, courtesy of Randy Travis. Other successful arrangements by Hendricks for Benton included "Thank You Pretty Baby", "Kiddio", and "The Boll Weevil Song".

== Still at Mercury, with Sarah Vaughan ==
As Hendricks's stature as an arranger grew, Mercury Records paired him with Sarah Vaughan. His arrangements for her produced one minor US hit, "Smooth Operator", written by Otis with Murray Stein and some takes on older songs, such as "My Ideal", "I Should Care", Irving Berlin's "Maybe It's Because I Love You Too Much" and versions of Mack Gordon and Harry Revel's "Never in a Million Years" and Charlie Chaplin's "Eternally". The song "Broken Hearted Melody" selected by arranger Belford Hendricks for Sarah Vaughan to record became the most successful recording of her entire career with the accompanying Belford Hendricks Orchestra.

== Columbia years ==
By 1960, Hendricks and Otis had been recruited by Columbia Records. Hendricks and Otis also took an unsuccessful crack at making Aretha Franklin a star. The team recorded dozens of tracks, including "Can't You Just See Me." By 1966, Columbia had lost about $90,000 on Franklin's recordings. However, decades after her hard-won success, those recordings were released.

Nat King Cole had already recorded some Hendricks co-compositions such as "Nothing In The World" and "Looking Back" in the late 1950s, and when he and his producers at Capitol Records decided to record "Ramblin' Rose" in 1962. The result was a worldwide hit and Hendricks was asked to submit arrangements for a full album in a similar country and western vein. When that brought more success, Hendricks arranged a follow-up Cole-meets-country album, Dear Lonely Hearts, whose title track became another singles chart hit.

== With other artists ==
Among other stars with whom Hendricks worked were big band leaders Jimmie Lunceford and Sy Oliver, Ivory Joe Hunter, Carmen McRae and Timi Yuro. Hendricks arranged songs for Aretha Franklin during her frustrating early career with Columbia, songs such as "A Mother's Love", "Runnin' Out of Fools" and "Can't You Just See Me".

When Al Martino, whose sub-operatic singing style had gone out of fashion in the early 1960s, wanted to develop a more understated vocal technique, Nat King Cole recommended that he contact Hendricks for help. Martino duly got his desired new sound and, to go with it, his biggest hit for years: a Hendricks-arranged reworking of the country song "I Love You Because", which got to number 3 on the Billboard pop chart in 1963. A full album followed, with Hendricks at the helm.

Hendricks composed over a hundred songs, more than half of them co-written, using either a variant of his real name or his complete pseudonym, Bill Henry. As well as the compositions for other stars mentioned above, these included "Call Me", a US number 21 for Johnny Mathis in 1958 (not to be confused with the later Tony Hatch–composed song of the same name), "First Star I See Tonight" for Patti Page, "I'm Too Far Gone (to Turn Around)" for Bobby Bland and "The Mixed Up Cup" for Clyde McPhatter. According to author David Leander Williams, "The name Belford Hendricks must go down in history as the greatest arranger of rhythm-and-blues hits of all times".
