= Songs I Love to Sing (Brook Benton album) =

Studio album by Brook Benton
- Released: 1960
- Recorded: 1960
- Genre: Traditional pop
- Length: 37:01
- Label: Mercury MG-20602
- Producer: Clyde Otis

Songs I Love to Sing is a 1960 studio album by the American singer Brook Benton, arranged and conducted by Belford Hendricks and produced by Clyde Otis.

== Track listing ==
1. "Moonlight in Vermont" (John Blackburn (songwriter), Karl Suessdorf) – 3:40
2. "It's Been a Long, Long Time" (Sammy Cahn, Jule Styne) – 2:28
3. "Lover, Come Back to Me" (Oscar Hammerstein II, Sigmund Romberg) – 3:07
4. "If You Are But a Dream" (Nat Bonx, Jack Fulton, Moe Jaffe) – 3:10
5. "Why Try to Change Me Now?" (Cy Coleman, Joseph McCarthy) – 2:57
6. "September Song" (Maxwell Anderson, Kurt Weill) – 3:06
7. "Oh! What It Seemed to Be" (Bennie Benjamin, Frankie Carle, George David Weiss) – 3:17
8. "Baby Won't You Please Come Home" (Charles Warfield, Clarence Williams) – 2:57
9. "They Can't Take That Away from Me" (George Gershwin, Ira Gershwin) – 2:57
10. "I'll Be Around" (Alec Wilder) – 2:28
11. "I Don't Know Enough About You" (Dave Barbour, Peggy Lee) – 4:29
12. "Fools Rush In (Where Angels Fear to Tread)" (Rube Bloom, Johnny Mercer) – 2:25

== Personnel ==
- Brook Benton – vocals
- Belford Hendricks – arranger
