= Smooth operator (disambiguation) =

Smooth operator or smoothing operator may also refer to:

- "Smooth Operator" (Sarah Vaughan song), 1959.
- "Smooth Operator" is a 1984 song by Sade.
- "Smooth Operator" (Big Daddy Kane song), 1989.
- A smoothing operator, used to remove noise from data.
- A mathematical operator, whose Schwartz kernel is a smooth function (i.e., infinitely differentiable).
- The nickname given to Carlos Sainz Jr. by many Formula One fans.
