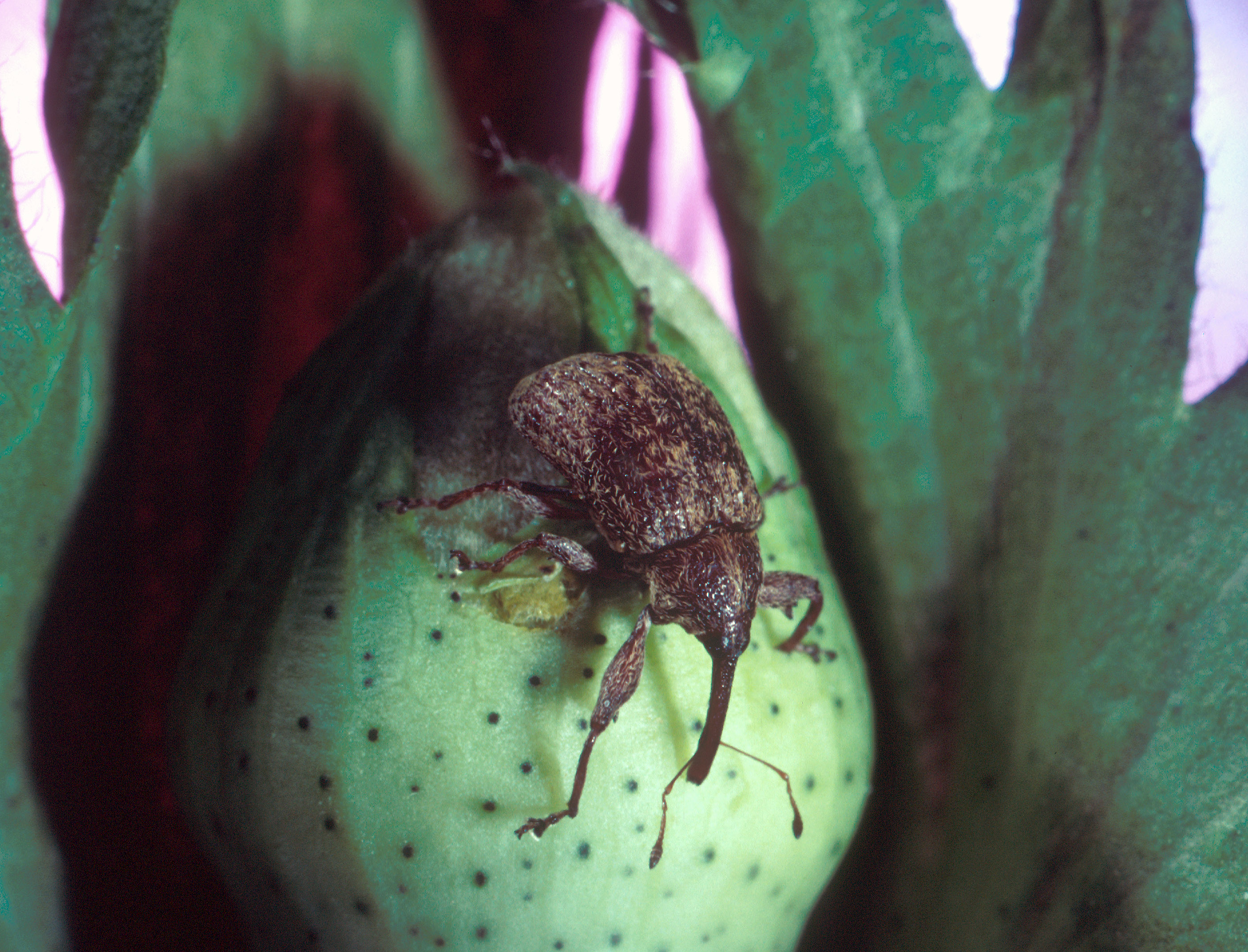
- Adult on a cotton boll

Scientific classification
- Kingdom: Animalia
- Phylum: Arthropoda
- Clade: Pancrustacea
- Class: Insecta
- Order: Coleoptera
- Suborder: Polyphaga
- Infraorder: Cucujiformia
- Superfamily: Curculionoidea
- Family: Curculionidae
- Genus: Anthonomus
- Species: A. grandis

Binomial name
- Anthonomus grandis Boheman, 1843

= Boll weevil =

Species of beetle

The boll weevil (Anthonomus grandis) is a species of beetle in the family Curculionidae. The boll weevil feeds on cotton buds and flowers. Thought to be native to Central Mexico, it migrated into the United States from Mexico in the late 19th century and had infested all U.S. cotton-growing areas by the 1920s, devastating the economy and society centered on King Cotton in the American South. During the late 20th century, it became a serious pest in South America as well. Since 1978, the Boll Weevil Eradication Program in the U.S. has allowed full-scale cultivation to resume in many regions.

== Description ==
The adult insect has a long rostrum ("snout"), a grayish color, and is usually less than 6 mm (1/4 in) in length.

== Life cycle ==
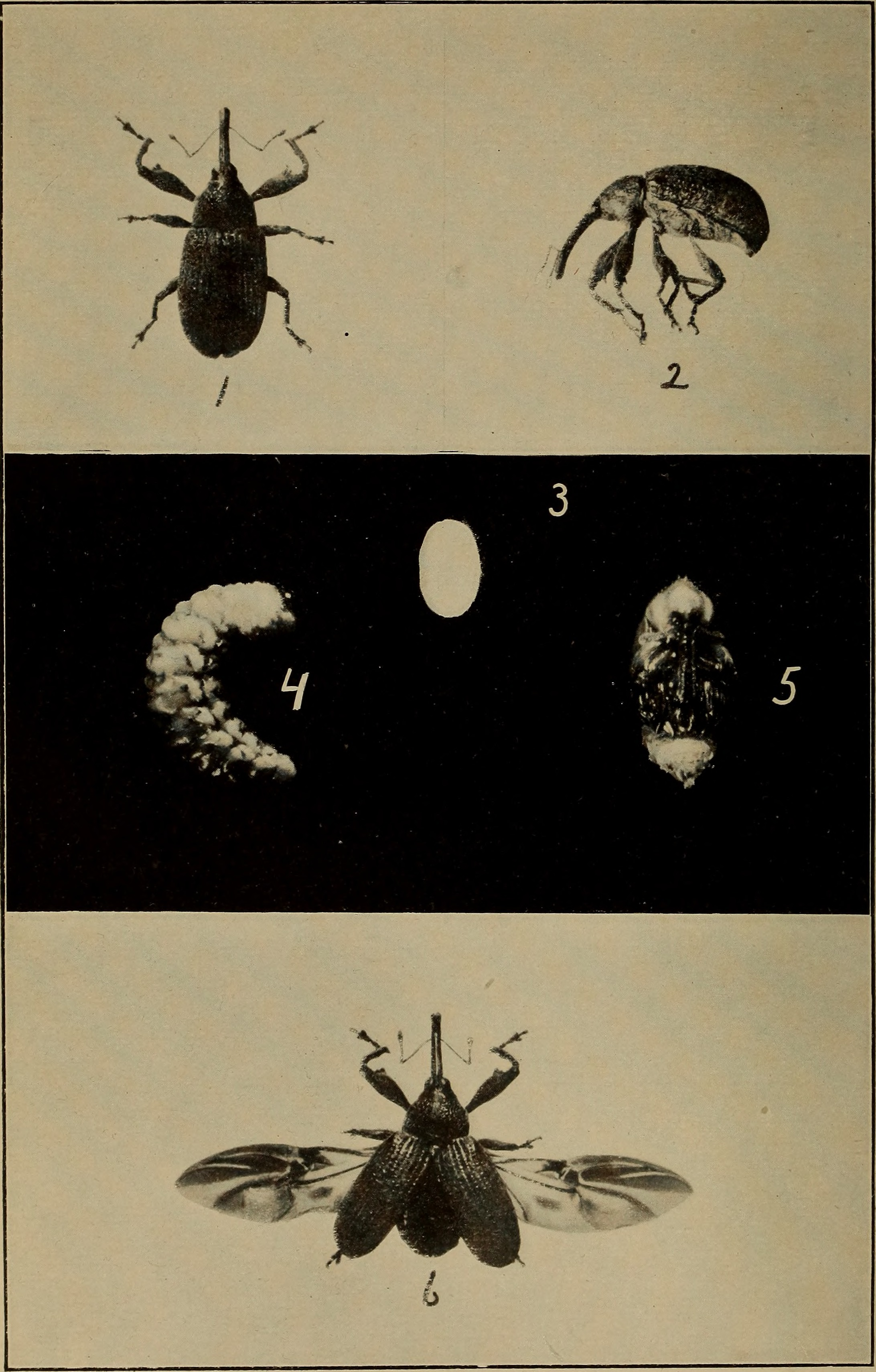
1) Dorsal view of adult; 2) side view of adult; 3) egg; 4) side view of larva; 5) ventral view of pupa; 6) adult, with wings spread

Adult weevils overwinter in well-drained areas in or near cotton fields, and farms after diapause. They emerge and enter cotton fields from early spring through midsummer, with peak emergence in late spring, and feed on immature cotton bolls.

The boll weevil lays its eggs inside buds and ripening bolls (fruits) of the cotton plants. The female can lay up to 200 eggs over a 10- to 12-day period. The oviposition leaves wounds on the exterior of the flower bud. The eggs hatch in 3 to 5 days within the cotton squares (larger buds before flowering), feed for 8 to 10 days, and then pupate. The pupal stage lasts another 5 to 7 days. The lifecycle from egg to adult spans about three weeks during the summer. Under optimal conditions, 8 to 10 generations per season may occur.

Boll weevils begin to die at temperatures at or below −5 °C (23 °F). Research at the University of Missouri indicates they cannot survive more than an hour at −15 °C (5 °F). The insulation offered by leaf litter, crop residues, and snow may enable the beetle to survive when air temperatures drop to these levels.

Other limitations on boll weevil populations include extreme heat and drought. The weevil's natural predators include fire ants, other insects, spiders, birds, and a parasitoid wasp, Catolaccus grandis. The weevils sometimes emerge from diapause before cotton buds are available.

== Infestation ==
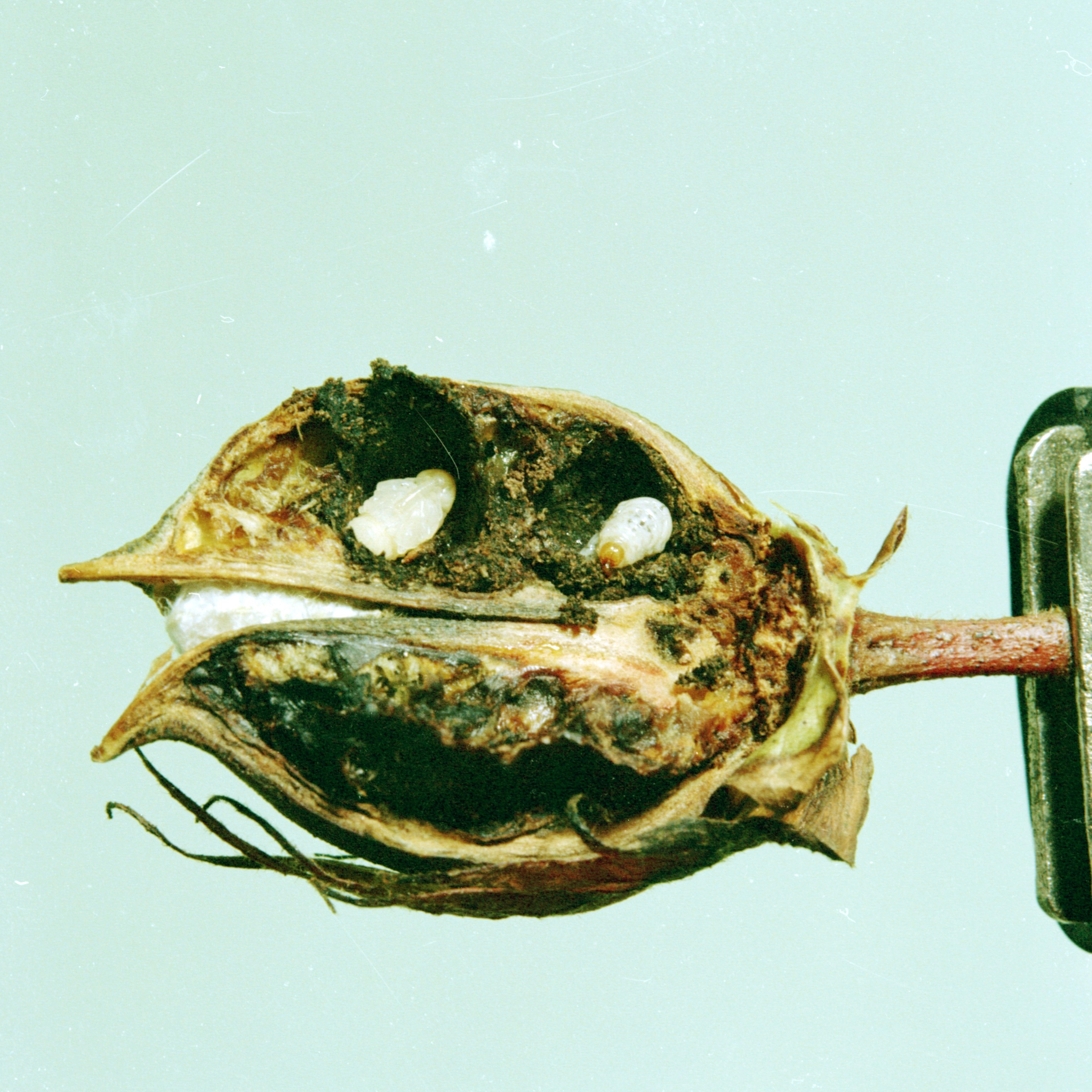
Cotton boll with weevil larvae.

The insect crossed the Rio Grande near Brownsville, Texas, to enter the United States from Mexico in 1892 and reached southeastern Alabama in 1909. By the mid-1920s, it had entered all cotton-growing regions in the U.S., traveling 40 to 160 miles per year. It remains the most destructive cotton pest in North America. Since the boll weevil entered the United States, it has cost U.S. cotton producers about $13 billion, and in recent times about $300 million per year.

The boll weevil contributed to Southern farmers' economic woes during the 1920s, a situation exacerbated by the Great Depression in the 1930s.

The boll weevil appeared in Venezuela in 1949 and Colombia in 1950. The Amazon rainforest was thought to present a barrier to the insect's further spread, until it was detected in Brazil in 1983. An estimated 90% of the cotton farms in Brazil are now infested. During the 1990s, the weevil spread to Paraguay and Argentina. The International Cotton Advisory Committee (ICAC) has proposed a control program similar to that used in the U.S.

== Control ==
During early years of the weevil's presence, growers sought relatively warm soils and early-ripening cultivars. Following World War II, the development of new pesticides such as DDT enabled U.S. farmers again to grow cotton as an economic crop. DDT was initially extremely effective, but U.S. weevil populations developed resistance by the mid-1950s. Methyl parathion, malathion, and pyrethroids were subsequently used, but environmental and resistance concerns arose as they had with DDT, and control strategies changed.

While many control methods have been investigated since the boll weevil entered the United States, insecticides have always remained the main control methods. In the 1980s, entomologists at Texas A&M University pointed to the spread of an invasive pest, the red imported fire ant, as a factor in the weevils' population decline in some areas.

Other avenues of control that have been explored include weevil-resistant strains of cotton, the parasitoid wasp Catolaccus grandis, the fungus Beauveria bassiana, and the Chilo iridescent virus. Genetically engineered Bt cotton is not protected from the boll weevil.

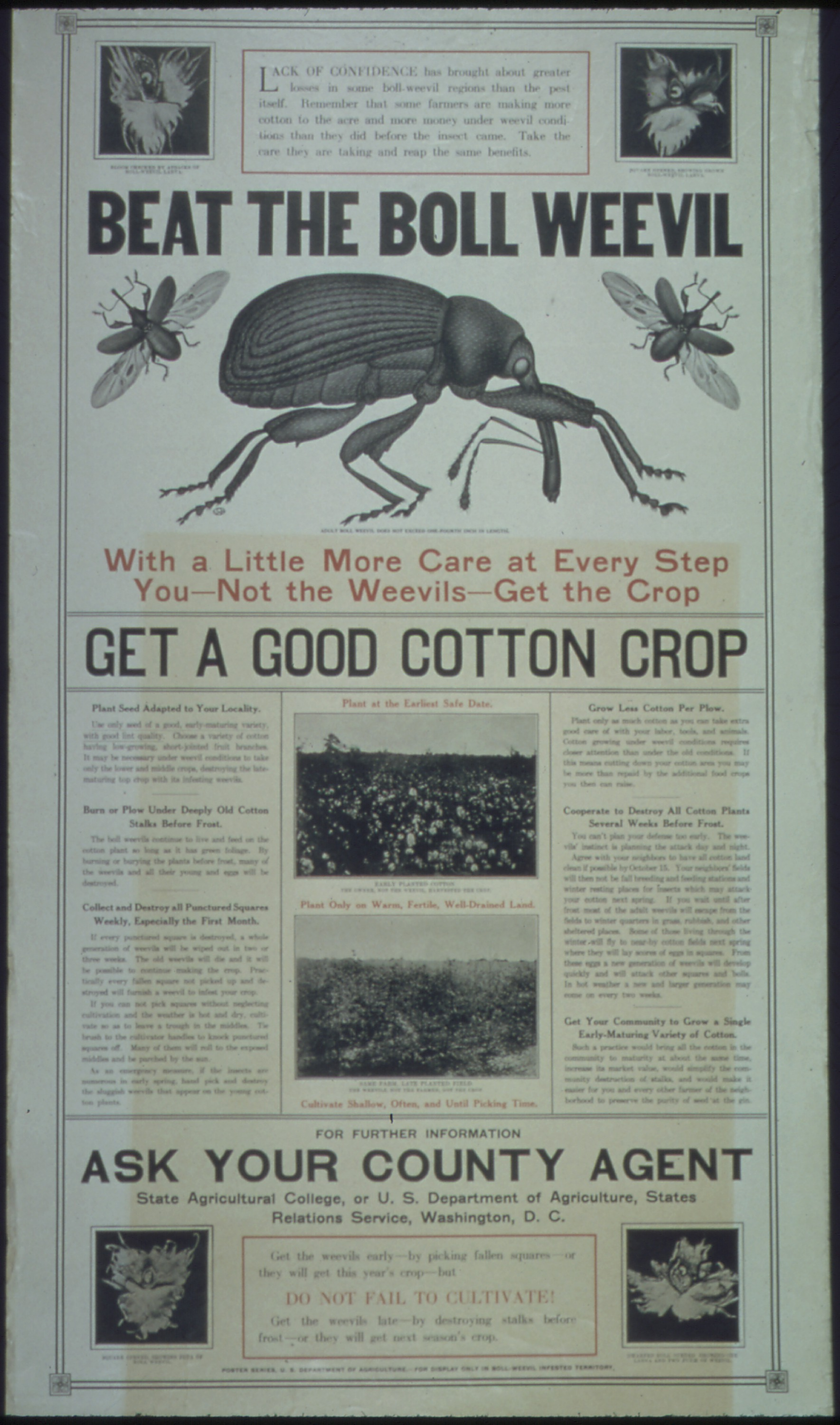
"Beat the boll weevil..." (U.S. Food Administration, Educational div., Advertising section, 1918–1919)

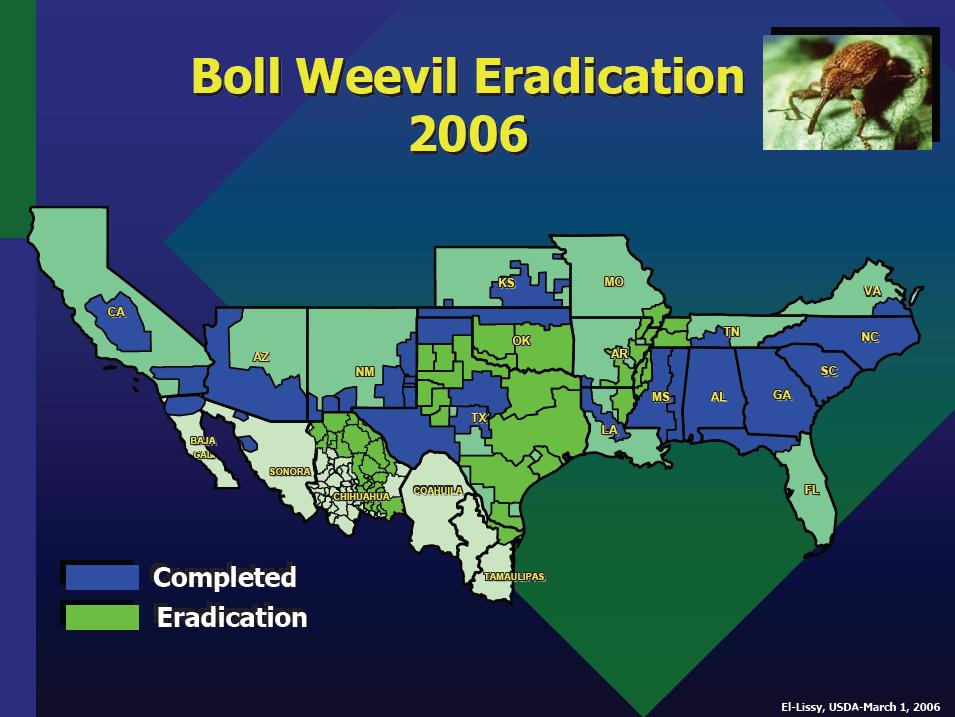
Eradication map (USDA, 2006)

Although it was possible to control the boll weevil, the necessary insecticide was costly. The goal of many cotton entomologists was to eventually eradicate the pest from U.S. cotton. In 1978, a large-scale test was begun in eastern North Carolina and in adjacent Southampton County, Virginia, to determine the feasibility of eradication. Based on the success of this test, area-wide programs were begun in the 1980s to eradicate the insect from whole regions. These are based on cooperative effort by all growers together with the assistance of the Animal and Plant Health Inspection Service (APHIS) of the United States Department of Agriculture (USDA).

Research methods were developed. The ability to distinguish between individuals which had eaten certain substances and those which had not was needed, to determine effectiveness of the active ingredients used. Lindig et al. 1980 studied several dietary dyes as markers. They find Calco Oil Red N-1700 to persist from larval feeding to adulthood, and for females to their eggs, although the resulting first instar was too faintly pink to be distinguishable.

The program has been successful in eradicating boll weevils from all cotton-growing states with the exception of Texas, and most of the state is free of boll weevils. Problems along the southern border with Mexico have delayed eradication in the extreme southern portions of Texas. Follow-up programs are in place in all cotton-growing states to prevent the reintroduction of the pest. These monitoring programs rely on pheromone-baited traps for detection. The boll weevil eradication program, although slow and costly, has paid off for cotton growers in reduced pesticide costs. This program and the screwworm program of the 1950s are among the biggest and most successful insect control programs in history.

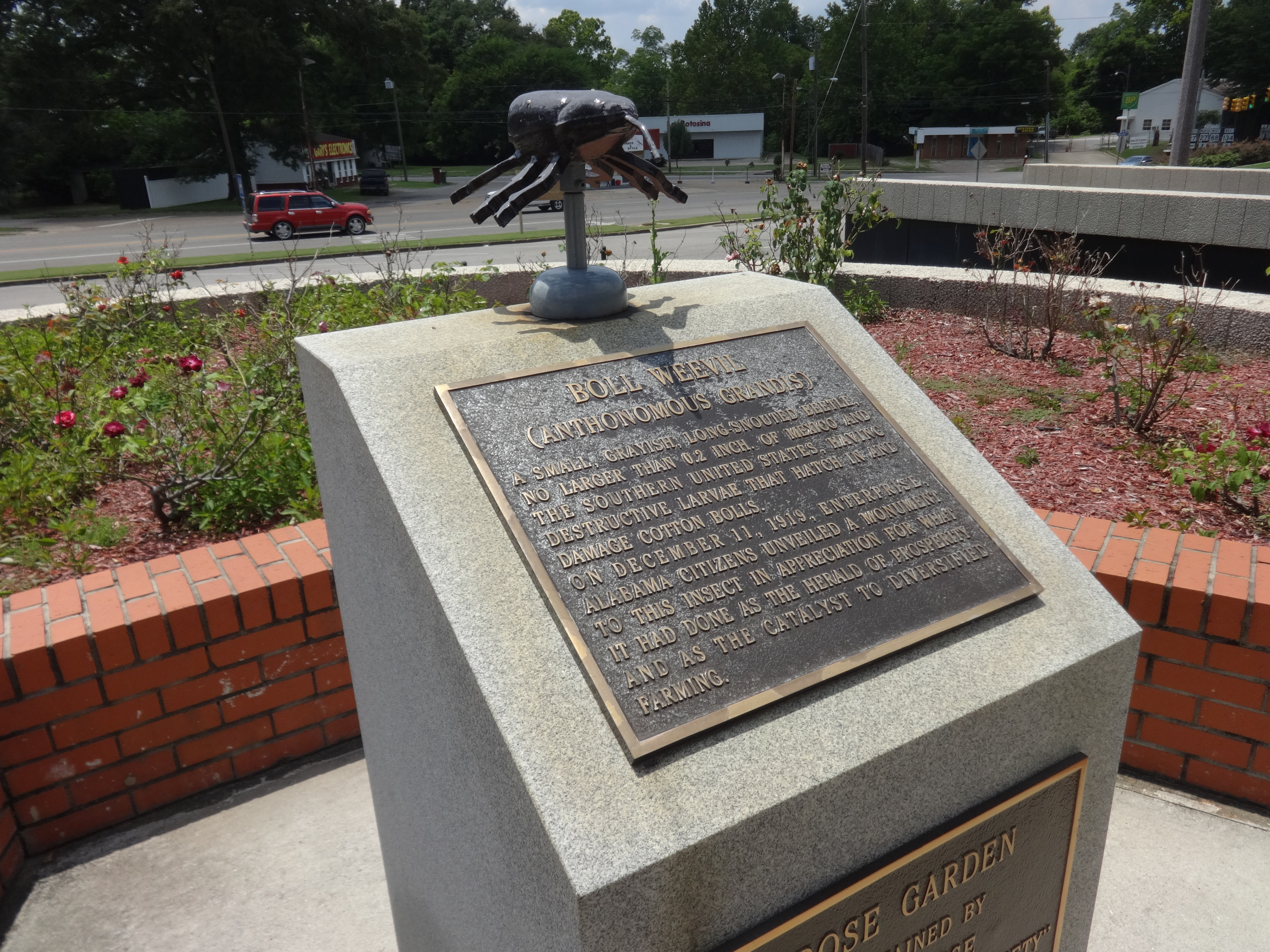
The boll weevil plaque in Enterprise, Alabama

== Impact ==
The Library of Congress American Memory Project contains a number of oral history materials on the boll weevil's impact.

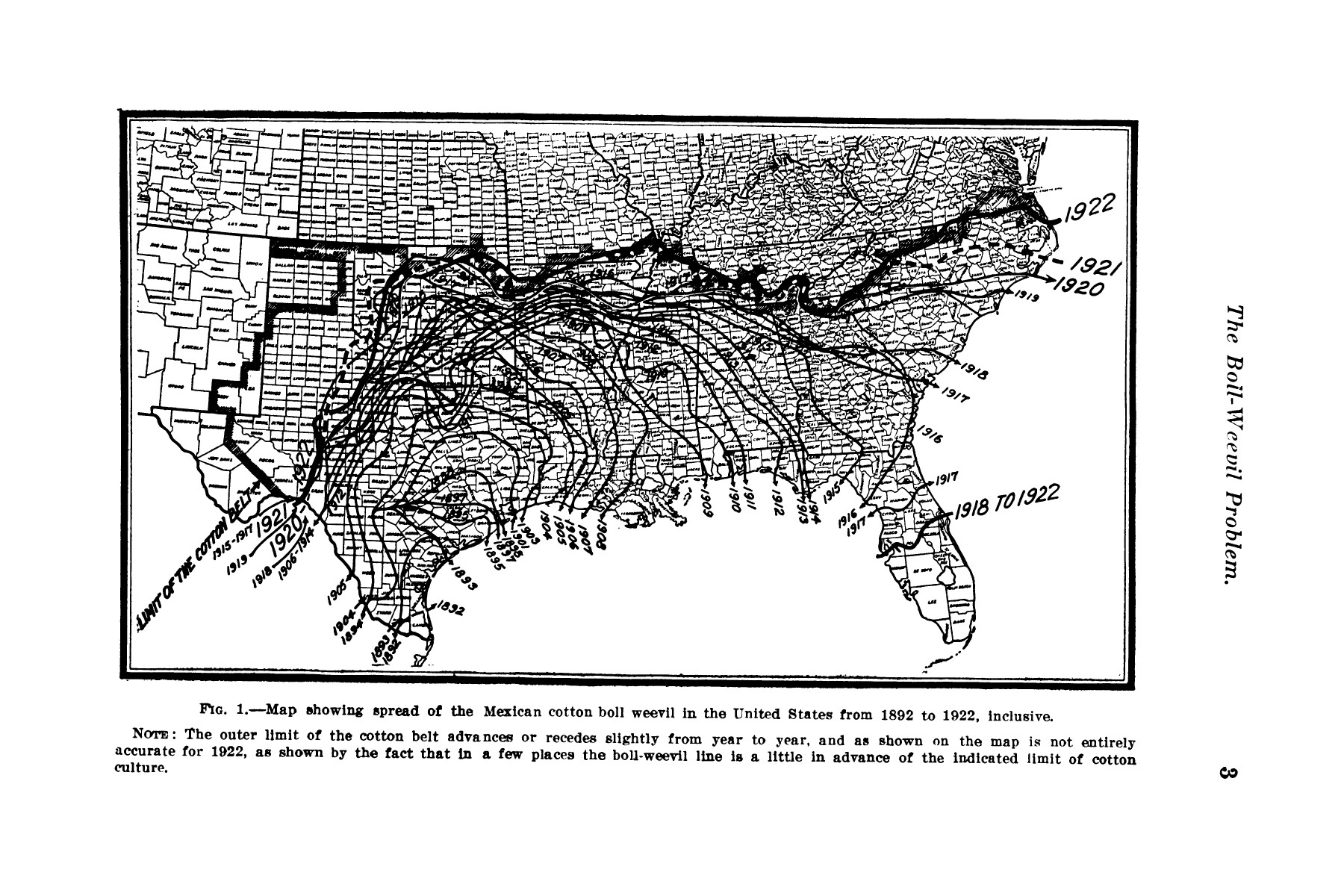
Spread of the boll weevil, 1892–1922

It devastated African Americans disproportionately because most were directly financially dependent on cotton as a cash crop. Because they were more likely to labor as tenant farmers or sharecroppers on cotton plantations in the Southern United States—the epicenter of the boll weevil infestation—Black farmers suffered disproportionately. Additionally, government intervention, such as the Agricultural Adjustment Act of 1933, resulted in the abandonment and loss of cropland for Black farmers.

By 1922, it was taking 8% of the cotton in the country annually. This failure of the South's primary crop became a major impetus for the Great Migration of the time, although not the only one. Thereby it was one of the factors in the birth of the Harlem Renaissance—including the culture of the Cotton Club. A 2009 study found "that as the weevil traversed the American South [in the period 1892-1932], it seriously disrupted local economies, significantly reduced the value of land (at this time still the most important asset in the American South), and triggered substantial intraregional population movements." A 2020 Journal of Economic History study found that the boll weevil spread between 1892 and 1922 had a beneficial impact on educational outcomes, as children were less likely to work on cultivating cotton. A 2020 NBER paper found that the boll weevil spread contributed to fewer lynchings, less Confederate monument construction, less KKK activity, and higher non-white voter registration.

The boll weevil infestation has been credited with bringing about economic diversification in the Southern US, including the expansion of peanut cropping. The citizens of Enterprise, Alabama, erected the Boll Weevil Monument in 1919, perceiving that their economy had been overly dependent on cotton and that mixed farming and manufacturing were better alternatives.

== In popular culture ==
Music

- "Boll Weevil" is a traditional blues song covered by artists including Huddie “Lead Belly” Ledbetter, Buster “Bus” Ezel, Woody Guthrie, and The White Stripes. It reached #2 on the Billboard chart in 1961 in a recording by Brook Benton.
- The song "Little Sister", originally recorded by Elvis Presley, makes a comparison between the insect and the sister. It says: "She's mean and she's evil like that little old boll weevil".

Sports

- The boll weevil is the mascot for the University of Arkansas at Monticello and Enterprise State Community College in Alabama and is listed on several "silliest" or "weirdest" mascots of all time.
- It was also the mascot of a short-lived minor league baseball team, the Temple Boll Weevils, which were alternatively called the "Cotton Bugs".

== See also ==
- Curculioninae, similar Curculionidae members that feed on different plants
  - Plum curculio
- Lixus concavus, the rhubarb curculio weevil, also similar
- Female sperm storage
- Black Belt in the American South
