= Hotel Happiness =

Single by Brook Benton
- B-side: "Still Water Runs Deep"
- Released: November 1962
- Genre: R&B
- Length: 2:40
- Label: Mercury
- Songwriter(s): Leon Carr, Earl Shuman
- Producer(s): Shelby Singleton

Brook Benton singles chronology
"Lie to Me" (1962)	"Hotel Happiness" (1962)	"The Boll Weevil Song" (1963)

"Hotel Happiness" is a song written by Leon Carr and Earl Shuman and performed by Brook Benton featuring The Merry Melody Singers. It reached #2 on the U.S. R&B chart, #3 on the U.S. pop chart, and #6 on the Cashbox chart in 1963.

The song was arranged by Jerry Kennedy and produced by Shelby Singleton.

The single's B-side, "Still Water Runs Deep", written by Bob Perper, Jack Aranda and Paul Gasper reached #81 on the Cashbox chart and #89 on the U.S. pop chart.

== Other versions ==
- Dora Hall released a version of the song as the B-side to her 1963 single "Did He Call Today, Mama?"
- Jumpin' Gene Simmons released a version of the song on his 1964 album Jumpin' Gene Simmons.
- Jimmy Smith released a version of the song on his 1967 album I'm Movin' On.
- The Persuasions released a version of the song on their 1993 album Toubo's Song.
- Mountain released a version of the song on their 1996 album Man's World.
