= The Boll Weevil Song and 11 Other Great Hits =

Studio album by Brook Benton
- Released: 1961
- Genre: R&B
- Length: 32:03
- Label: Mercury

Brook Benton chronology
| If You Believe (1961) | The Boll Weevil Song and 11 Other Great Hits (1961) | There Goes That Song Again (1962) |

Professional ratings
Review scores
| Source | Rating |
|---|---|
| AllMusic | 4/5 stars |
| The Encyclopedia of Popular Music | 3/5 stars |

The Boll Weevil Song and 11 Other Great Hits is a studio album released by Brook Benton in 1961 on Mercury LP record MG 20641 (mono) and SR 60641 (stereo). The album appeared on Billboard's album charts in 1961 for 13 weeks, reaching position number 70. The orchestrations were done by Stan Applebaum, who also conducted the orchestra on the sessions.

Following the significant popularity of Benton's hit "The Boll Weevil Song," Mercury quickly arranged sessions which largely rely on American Caucasian folk music for material, although Benton took composition credit for most of the songs. The result is a mix of R&B and pop. Allmusic reviews the album favorably, but its reviewer, Greg Adams, wishes the rest of the album had the "fire" contained in the title track.

== Track listing ==
All tracks composed by Brook Benton except where indicated.

| No. | Title | Writer(s) | Length |
|---|---|---|---|
| 1. | "The Boll Weevil Song" | Brook Benton - Clyde Otis | 2:35 |
| 2. | "Honey Babe" | Dave Dreyer | 2:21 |
| 3. | "A Worried Man" | | 3:24 |
| 4. | "Careless Love" | | 2:43 |
| 5. | "My Last Dollar" | | 2:40 |
| 6. | "Key to the Highway" | Charles Segar - Willie Broonzy | 2:26 |
| 7. | "Frankie and Johnny" | adapted by Brook Benton | 2:21 |
| 8. | "The Intoxicated Rat" | | 2:42 |
| 9. | "Johnny-O" | | 2:09 |
| 10. | "It's My Lazy Day" | Smiley Burnette | 2:35 |
| 11. | "Child of the Engineer" | | 3:35 |
| 12. | "Four Thousand Years Ago" | | 2:32 |
| Total length: | | | 32:03 |
