= Thank You Pretty Baby =

Single by Brook Benton

from the album Golden Hits
- B-side: "With All of My Heart"
- Released: June 1959
- Recorded: 1959
- Genre: Soul
- Length: 2:19
- Label: Mercury
- Songwriter(s): Brook Benton, Clyde Otis

Brook Benton singles chronology
"Endlessly" (1959)	"Thank You Pretty Baby" (1959)	"With All of My Heart" (1959)

"Thank You Pretty Baby" is 1959 R&B/pop hit by Brook Benton. The song was written by Brook Benton and Clyde Otis.

== Chart performance ==
The single was the second release for Benton as solo artist to reach number one on the R&B charts. It held the top spot for four weeks. "Thank You Pretty Baby" was a successful crossover hit, peaking at number sixteen on the Billboard Hot 100. In Canada it reached number nineteen.

== Cover version ==
- The track was covered by Curley Bridges on his 1999 album, Keys to the Blues.
