= Songs I Love to Sing =

Songs I Love to Sing may refer to:

- Songs I Love to Sing (Brook Benton album), 1960
- Songs I Love to Sing (Slim Whitman album), 1980
