= Baby Won't You Please Come Home =

1919 blues song

Song
- Published: 1919
- Genre: Blues
- Songwriters: Charles Warfield, Clarence Williams

"Baby Won't You Please Come Home" is a blues song written by Charles Warfield and Clarence Williams in 1919. The song's authorship is disputed; Warfield claims that he was the sole composer of the song.

The song has been covered by many musicians and has become a jazz standard. The first hit version was Bessie Smith's 1923 recording, which stayed on the charts for four weeks, peaking at No. 6.

== Renditions ==
- Eva Taylor (1922)
- Bessie Smith (1923)
- Clarence Williams' Blue Five (1927)
- George Thomas with McKinney's Cotton Pickers (1930)
- Clarence Williams and His Orchestra (1930)
- Clarence Williams and His Jazz Kings (1931)
- The Mills Brothers (1932)
- Django Reinhardt (1937)
- Lionel Hampton (1938)
- Louis Armstrong (1939)
- Count Basie Orchestra (1944)
- Bing Crosby with Eddie Heywood, recorded August 9, 1945.
- Benny Goodman and His Orchestra (1945)
- Jo Stafford with the Nat King Cole Trio (1946)
- Sidney Bechet & His Feetwarmers (1949)
- Ray Charles (1952)
- Jack Teagarden (1954)
- Frank Sinatra - included in his album Where Are You? (1957)
- Louis Prima with Keely Smith (1957)
- Billie Holiday (1959)
- Ricky Nelson (1960) - More Songs by Ricky
- Della Reese (1960)
- Brook Benton recorded it for his 1960 album Songs I Love to Sing
- Ella Fitzgerald on her 1961 Verve release Ella in Hollywood
- Ann-Margret (1961)
- Sam Cooke (1962)
- Sarah Vaughan (1962) - Sarah + 2, Sarah Sings Soulfully (1965)
- Dinah Washington - Drinking Again (1962)
- Al Hirt (1962) on his album, Horn A-Plenty
- Miles Davis - Seven Steps to Heaven (1963)
- Dean Martin on his albums Dream with Dean (1964) and The Dean Martin TV Show (1966)
- Carol Channing on her album Carol Channing Entertains (1965)
- Gloria Lynne (1965)
- Julie London - Nice Girls Don't Stay for Breakfast (1967)
- James Booker - Junco Partner (1976)
- James Booker - Gonzo James Booker Live 1976 (1967)
- Coco Briaval (France 1999 album Minor Swing)
- David Sanborn - Only Everything (2010)
- Elisabeth Bougerol (2011), with The Hot Sardines Band
- Kathy Hampson's Free Elastic Band
- Leon Redbone
- Nolan Perez

== Film appearances ==
- 1945 That's the Spirit - performed by Johnny Coy and Peggy Ryan.
- 1986 Act of Vengeance
- 2008 Igor - performed by Louis Prima.
- 2018 Rendezvous in Chicago - performed by Eva Taylor

== See also ==
- List of pre-1920 jazz standards
