= So Many Ways (Brook Benton song) =

Single by Brook Benton

from the album I Love You in So Many Ways
- B-side: "I Want You Forever"
- Released: October 1959
- Genre: Soul
- Length: 2:29
- Label: Mercury
- Songwriter(s): Bobby Stevenson
- Producer(s): Clyde Otis

Brook Benton singles chronology
"With All of My Heart" (1959)	"So Many Ways" (1959)	"This Time of the Year" (1959)

"So Many Ways" is a 1959 single by Brook Benton written by Bobby Stevenson. The single was Benton's third release to hit number one on the R&B singles chart in 1959. "So Many Ways" hit the number one spot for three non-consecutive weeks and was also Benton's second top ten pop hit, peaking at number six.

== Chart positions ==
Chart (1959)	Peak position
Canada CHUM Chart	18
U.S. Billboard Hot 100	6
U.S. Billboard Hot R&B Singles	1
