= Looking Back (Nat King Cole song) =

Single by Nat King Cole
- B-side: "Do I Like It?"
- Released: 1958
- Recorded: February 4, 1958
- Genre: Easy listening
- Length: 2:10
- Label: Capitol 3939
- Songwriters: Brook Benton, Belford Hendricks, Clyde Otis
- Producer: Lee Gillette

Nat King Cole singles chronology
"Night of the Quarter Moon" (1958)	"Looking Back" (1958)	"Come Closer to Me (Acercate Mas)" (1958)

"Looking Back" is a song written by Brook Benton, Belford Hendricks, and Clyde Otis and performed by Nat King Cole. It reached number 2 on the U.S. R&B chart and number 5 on the U.S. pop chart in 1958.

The single's B-side, "Do I Like It?" reached number 67 on the U.S. pop chart in 1958.

The song was ranked number 31 on Billboard's Year-End Hot 100 singles of 1958.

== Other charting versions ==
- Cole re-released a version of the song in 1965 which reached number 27 on the adult contemporary chart and number 123 on the U.S. pop chart.
- Joe Simon released a version of the song as a single in 1969 which reached number 42 on the U.S. R&B chart and number 70 on the U.S. pop chart.
