= A Rockin' Good Way (to Mess Around and Fall in Love) =

Song written by Brook Benton and Clyde Otis

Single by Dinah Washington and Brook Benton

from the album The Two of Us
- B-side: "I Believe"
- Released: May 1960
- Recorded: March 1960
- Genre: Soul
- Length: 2:25
- Label: Mercury Records: 671629
- Songwriters: Brook Benton, Clyde Otis; Luchi de Jesus
- Producer: Clyde Otis

Dinah Washington and Brook Benton singles chronology
"Baby (You've Got What It Takes)" (1960)	"A Rockin' Good Way (to Mess Around and Fall in Love)" (1960)

Dinah Washington singles chronology
"It Could Happen to You" (1960)	"A Rockin' Good Way (to Mess Around and Fall in Love)" (1960)	"This Bitter Earth" (1960)

Brook Benton singles chronology
"Hither and Thither and Yon" (1960)	"A Rockin' Good Way (to Mess Around and Fall in Love)" (1960)	"Kiddio" (1960)

"A Rockin' Good Way (to Mess Around and Fall in Love)" is a song first recorded in 1958 by Priscilla Bowman, on the Abner Records label (ABNER DJ 1018). Bowman was given vocal backing by The Spaniels.

== Dinah Washington and Brook Benton version ==
In 1960 the song was recorded as a pop and R&B duet by Dinah Washington and Brook Benton. The single was the second pairing for the singers and, like their first single together, it went to number 1 on the R&B chart and was a top ten pop single as well.

The song was written by Benton, Clyde Otis and Luchi de Jesus. The single, with the song title styled "A Rockin' Good Way (to Mess Around and Fall in Love)", included orchestra arranged and conducted by Belford Hendricks.

=== Weekly charts ===
Chart (1960)	Peak position
Australia (Kent Music Report)	28
Canada (CHUM)	17
US Billboard Hot 100	7
US Hot R&B/Hip-Hop Songs (Billboard)	1
US Cash Box Top 100	5

==== Year-end charts ====
Chart (1960)	Position
US Billboard Top 100	75
US Cash Box Top 100	44

== Shakin' Stevens and Bonnie Tyler version ==
"A Rockin' Good Way"

Single by Shakin' Stevens & Bonnie Tyler

from the album The Bop Won't Stop
- B-side: "Why Do You Treat Me This Way?"
- Released: 30 December 1983
- Recorded: 1983
- Studio: Eden Studios, London
- Genre: Rock and roll; pop rock
- Length: 2:55
- Label: Epic
- Songwriters: Brook Benton; Clyde Otis; Luchi DeJesus
- Producer: Christopher Neil

Shakin' Stevens singles chronology
"Cry Just a Little Bit" (1983)	"A Rockin' Good Way" (1983)	"A Love Worth Waiting For" (1984)

Bonnie Tyler singles chronology
"Take Me Back" (1983)	"A Rockin' Good Way" (1983)	"Holding Out for a Hero" (1984)

Official video
- "A Rockin' Good Way (To Mess Around And Fall In Love)" on YouTube

A duet by Welsh singers Shakin' Stevens and Bonnie Tyler was released on 30 December 1983; it made number 5 in the UK Singles Chart and number 1 in Ireland. It was included on Stevens' 1984 album The Bop Won't Stop. The B-side was a live recording by Stevens of "Why Do You Treat Me This Way?" at the Birmingham Odeon.

=== Charts ===
==== Weekly charts ====
Weekly chart performance for "A Rockin' Good Way"
Charts (1984)	Peak position
Australia (Kent Music Report)	21
Austria (Ö3 Austria Top 40)	9
Belgium (Ultratop 50 Flanders)	5
Ireland (IRMA)	1
Netherlands (Dutch Top 40)	8
Netherlands (Single Top 100)	8
New Zealand (Recorded Music NZ)	8
Norway (VG-lista)	4
Sweden (Sverigetopplistan)	11
Switzerland (Schweizer Hitparade)	10
UK Singles (Official Charts)	5
West Germany (GfK)	22

==== Year-end charts ====
1984 year-end chart performance for "A Rockin' Good Way"
Chart (1984)	Position
Belgium (Ultratop Flanders)	60
New Zealand (Recorded Music NZ)	33
