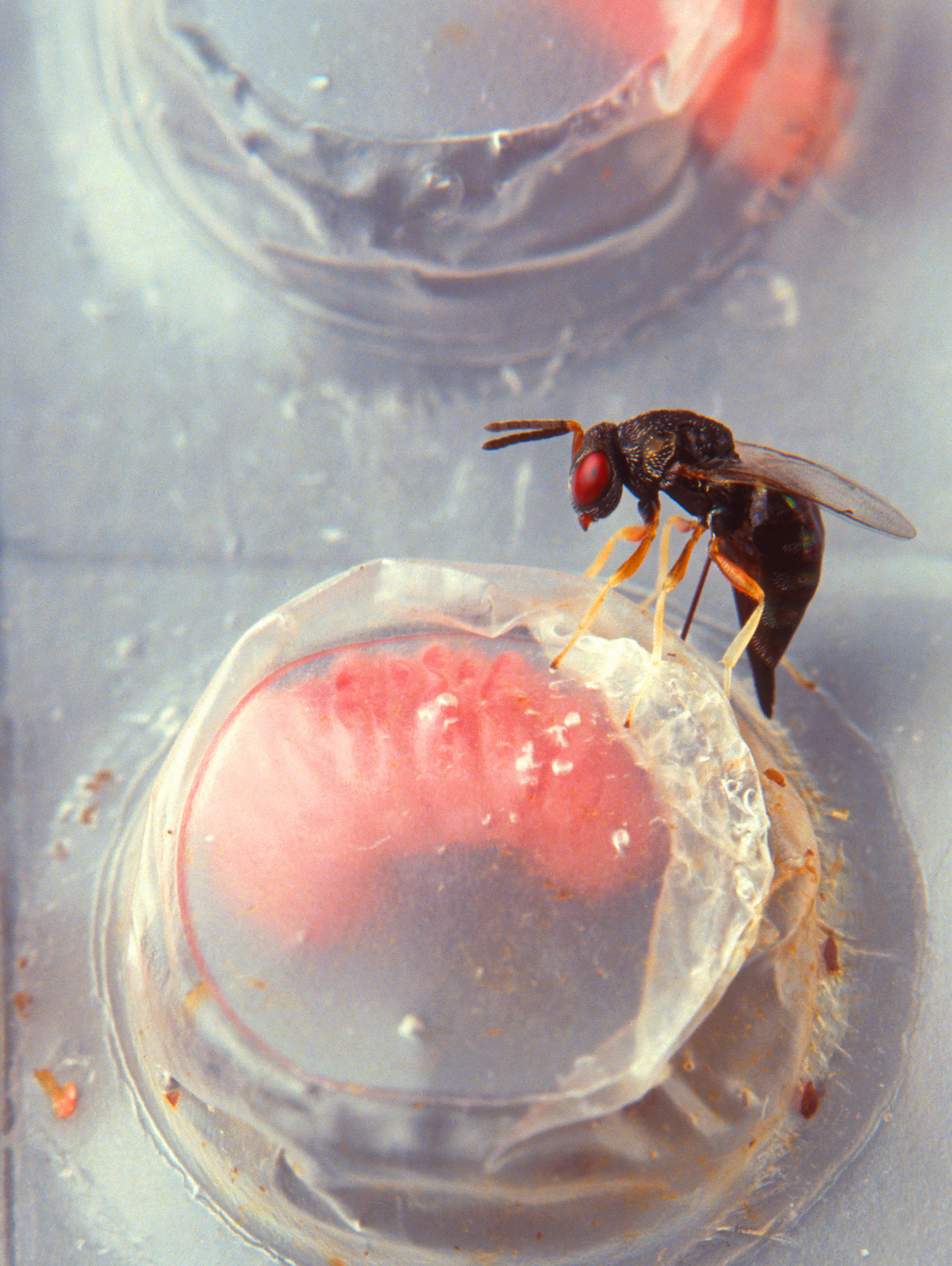
- Catolaccus grandis

Scientific classification
- Kingdom: Animalia
- Phylum: Arthropoda
- Class: Insecta
- Order: Hymenoptera
- Family: Pteromalidae
- Genus: Catolaccus; Thomson 1878

Species
- See text

= Catolaccus =

Genus of wasps

Catolaccus is a parasitic wasp genus in the family Pteromalidae. Catolaccus grandis has been used by cotton farmers in Texas to combat crop damage from the boll weevil.

== Species ==
- Catolaccus aeneoviridis (Girault, 1911)
- Catolaccus ater (Ratzeburg, 1852)
- Catolaccus coleophorae Dzhanokmen, 1990
- Catolaccus crassiceps (Masi 1911)
- Catolaccus cyaneus Girault, 1911
- Catolaccus cyanoideus Burks, 1954
- Catolaccus endonis Ishii, 1940
- Catolaccus fragariae Rohwer, 1934
- Catolaccus grandis (Burks 1954)
- Catolaccus helice (Walker, 1843)
- Catolaccus kansensis (Girault, 1917)
- Catolaccus kumatshjovi Dzhanokmen, 1980
- Catolaccus pallipes Ashmead, 1894
- Catolaccus tepicensis Ashmead, 1895
- Catolaccus victoria Burks, 1954
