= Baby (You've Got What It Takes) =

- Japanese release picture sleeve

Single by Dinah Washington and Brook Benton

from the album The Two of Us
- B-side: "I Do"
- Released: January 1960
- Recorded: August 1959
- Genre: R&B
- Length: 2:42
- Label: Mercury Records: AMT 1083
- Songwriters: Clyde Otis, Murray Stein
- Producer: Clyde Otis

Dinah Washington and Brook Benton singles chronology
"Baby (You've Got What It Takes)" (1960)	"A Rockin' Good Way (to Mess Around and Fall in Love)" (1960)

Dinah Washington singles chronology
"Unforgettable" (1959)	"Baby (You've Got What It Takes)" (1960)	"It Could Happen to You" (1960)

Brook Benton singles chronology
"This Time of the Year" (1959)	"Baby (You've Got What It Takes)" (1960)	"The Ties That Bind" (1960)

Official audio
- "Baby (You've Got What It Takes)" on YouTube

"Baby (You've Got What It Takes)" is a song written by Clyde Otis and Murray Stein.

Originally titled "You've Got What It Takes", the song was first recorded by Brook Benton's sister, Dorothy Pay, in 1958, as the B-side of her single "Strollin' with My Baby" on Mercury 71277.

In August 1959, Brook Benton partnered with Dinah Washington to record the song as "Baby (You've Got What It Takes)". Their version, released in January 1960, was hugely successful on both the pop and R&B charts, reaching No.5 on the Billboard Hot 100 and No.1 on the Hot R&B sides chart for ten weeks, becoming one of the most successful R&B singles of the 1960s. The song was also featured on their 1960 duet album, The Two of Us.

Piano parts were composed by Joe Zawinul and Belford Hendricks was the arranger and conductor.

== Charts ==
=== Dinah Washington and Brook Benton ===
Chart (1960)	Peak position
Canada CHUM Chart	14
US Billboard Hot 100	5
US Billboard Hot R&B Sides	1

== Later versions ==
- Charlie Louvin and Melba Montgomery recorded a duet on their 1971 album, Baby, You've Got What It Takes, with the single peaking at No. 30 on the country charts.
- Kevin Mahogany included it as a duet with Jeanie Bryson in his 1995 album You Got What It Takes.
- Canadian singer-songwriter Michael Bublé recorded it, featuring Sharon Jones & the Dap-Kings, for his 2009 album Crazy Love. The song was also released as a single.
- Ledisi recorded the song with Gregory Porter and released it as the third single from her Dinah Washington tribute album For Dinah (2025).
