= Fools Rush In (Where Angels Fear to Tread) =

1940 song by Rube Bloom and Johnny Mercer

"Fools Rush In Where Angels Fear to Tread"

Single by Glenn Miller and his Orchestra (Vocal Ray Eberle)
- B-side: "Yours Is My Heart Alone"
- Published: May 1, 1940 by Bregman, Vocco and Conn, Inc., New York
- Released: May 24, 1940
- Recorded: March 31, 1940
- Studio: Victor Gramercy Recording Studio, New York. Studio 2
- Genre: Swing
- Length: 2:35
- Label: Bluebird B-10728
- Composer: Rube Bloom
- Lyricist: Johnny Mercer

"Fools Rush In" (1940) is a popular song with lyrics written by Johnny Mercer and music by Rube Bloom.

History of the song according to The Billboard, September 28, 1940 issue, page 34: Four years ago (1936) "Fools Rush In" was known as "Shangrila," composed by Rube Bloom and introduced in one of the production numbers at the Chez Paree, Chicago. Little was heard of it until this past summer when Rube played it for Bregman, Vocco and Conn, New York music publishers, who suggested that new lyrics be written. Johnny Mercer was called in and he supplied the words, which have been widely accepted by the public. (The line "Fools rush in where angels fear to tread" is from "An Essay on Criticism", written by Alexander Pope in the 18th century.)

== First recordings ==
The major hits at the time of introduction were:

- Tony Martin, (31 March 1940)
- Glenn Miller with Ray Eberle, (31 March 1940)
- Tommy Dorsey with Frank Sinatra (29 March 1940)
- Anne Shelton and Ambrose (August 1940)
- Harry James (Varsity 8264, 1940)

== Rick Nelson recording ==
In 1963, Rick Nelson recorded his version, which was included in his Rick Nelson Sings "For You" LP and was a hit, reaching #12 on the Billboard pop chart and #24 on the Hot R&B Singles chart. This recording became the highest charting single version of this song.

== Other notable recordings ==
- Billy Eckstine (1947)
- Stan Getz – Complete Studio Sessions: Stan Getz & Jimmy Raney (1952)
- Count Basie – Dance Along with Basie (1960); as arranged by Thad Jones (recorded in 1959)
- Brook Benton – Songs I Love to Sing (1960) (#18 CAN)
- Shirley Bassey – Shirley Bassey (1961)
- Al Hirt – Trumpet and Strings (1962)
- Etta James – Etta James Sings for Lovers (1962)
- Johnny Hartman – Unforgettable Songs by Johnny Hartman (1966)
- Elvis Presley – Elvis Now (1972)
- She & Him covered Ricky Nelson's version for Levi's Pioneer Sessions in 2010.
