= Kiddio =

Song by Brook Benton and Clyde Otis

Single by Brook Benton
- B-side: "The Same One"
- Released: July 1960
- Recorded: 1960
- Genre: R&B
- Length: 2:35
- Songwriters: Brook Benton, Clyde Otis

Brook Benton singles chronology
"A Rockin' Good Way (to Mess Around and Fall in Love)" (1960)	"Kiddio" (1960)	"Think Twice" (1961)

"Kiddio" is a 1960 R&B/pop song written by Brook Benton and Clyde Otis. The song was first recorded and released in 1957 by Teddy Randazzo.

== Brook Benton recording ==
"Kiddio" was later released as a single by Brook Benton in 1960. Randazzo and Benton both recorded for RCA's Vik label. The single was the fourth time in a year that Brook Benton had topped the R&B charts. However, two of those times, he'd hit number one with duet partner, Dinah Washington. "Kiddio" also continued Brook Benton's popularity on the pop charts by making it his fifth top-ten pop single.

== Chart history ==
Chart (1960)	Peak position
CAN CHUM Chart	16
U.S. Billboard Hot 100	7
U.S. Billboard Hot R&B Sides	1
U.S. Cash Box Top 100	3

== Cover versions ==
- Kiddio was covered by Johnny Littlejohn in 1966 under the title "Kitty O". Johnny Littlejohn scaled back the instrumentation (no violins, or orchestral sounds) and applied an electric Blues guitar treatment to the song.
- Kiddio was later covered in 1990 by Native American Blues artist Charlie Musselwhite in 1990 under the title "Kiddeo". Charlie Musselwhite emphasized the modern harmonica Blues in his version.
- In 1990, The Paladins recorded a roots-rockabilly version on their Let's Buzz album.
- In 1995 John Lee Hooker included a version on his Chill Out album.

== Popular culture ==
- Randazzo's version is featured in the 1957 movie Mister Rock and Roll.
