= It's Just a Matter of Time (song) =

1959 single by Brook Benton, Clyde Otis, and Belford Hendricks

"It's Just a Matter of Time" is a song written by Brook Benton, Clyde Otis, and Belford Hendricks. The original recording by Benton topped the Billboard Hot R&B Sides chart in 1959 and peaked at No. 3 on the Hot 100 pop chart, the first in a string of hits for Benton that ran through 1970.

The song found a second life as a country song, with major hit recordings by three country music performers during the 1970s and 1980s, two of which hit No. 1.

== Origin and original success ==
"It's Just a Matter of Time"

Single by Brook Benton

from the album It's Just a Matter of Time
- B-side: "Hurtin' Inside"
- Released: January 1959
- Recorded: 1958
- Studio: Fine Recording, New York City
- Genre: Pop; rhythm and blues
- Length: 2:28
- Label: Mercury
- Songwriters: Brook Benton; Belford Hendricks; Clyde Otis
- Producer: Belford Hendricks

Brook Benton singles chronology
"Crazy In Love With You" (1958)	"It's Just a Matter of Time" (1959)	"Endlessly" (1959)

=== Writing ===
Brook Benton, Belford Hendricks and Clyde Otis established themselves as a songwriting team in the late 1950s, penning hits for Nat King Cole ("Looking Back") and Clyde McPhatter ("A Lover's Question"). During one songwriting session, Benton expressed frustration that they were not hitting on any good ideas, to which Otis replied, "It's just a matter of time, Brook". Those words inspired them to write a love song from the point of view of a man who misses his love, but believes she will come back to him.

=== Benton's recording ===
Benton and Otis placed the song on a demo tape for Cole, and he agreed to record it. However, Otis became an A&R manager at Mercury Records, and signed Benton to the label. Otis felt that "It's Just A Matter Of Time" would be an ideal single for Benton, and he asked Cole not to record the song so it could be Benton's first release on the label. Belford Hendricks, a classically trained composer, co-wrote and arranged the recording. Benton's version, in a style clearly influenced by Cole, was a quick success, rising to number three on the Billboard pop charts while topping the R&B chart for 9 weeks in the spring of 1959, the longest run atop the chart of any song that year. On April 12, during the song's chart run, Benton made his national television debut, singing the song on The Ed Sullivan Show. While Benton had had one previous minor hit ("A Million Miles From Nowhere"), this success established him to the public, leading to a continuous string of hits through 1962, and occasional success thereafter.

==== Chart positions ====
Chart (1959)	Peak position
Canada CHUM Chart	6
US Billboard Hot 100	3
U.S. R&B Singles	1

== Country renditions ==
=== Sonny James version ===
"It's Just a Matter of Time"

Single by Sonny James

from the album It's Just a Matter of Time
- B-side: "This World Of Ours"
- Released: January 1970
- Recorded: 1969
- Genre: Country
- Length: 2:35
- Label: Capitol Nashville
- Songwriters: Brook Benton; Belford Hendricks; Clyde Otis
- Producer: George Richey

Sonny James singles chronology
"Since I Met You Baby" (1969)	"It's Just a Matter of Time" (1970)	"My Love" (1970)

The first cover version that became a country hit was recorded by Sonny James; his version spent four weeks atop the Billboard magazine Hot Country Singles chart in February 1970. The song was James' 10th in a string of 16 consecutive chart-topping single releases, spanning from 1967-1971.

James performed the song on The Ed Sullivan Show on January 11, 1970, just days after the single was released, and Hee Haw on January 21.

==== Chart positions ====
Chart (1970)	Peak position
US Hot Country Songs (Billboard)	1
US Billboard Hot 100	87
Canadian RPM Country Tracks	4
Canadian RPM Top Singles	85

=== Glen Campbell version ===
In 1985, Glen Campbell — at the time on the roster of Atlantic America Records — recorded his version and released it as a single. His version peaked at No. 7 on the Billboard Hot Country Singles chart in February 1986.

==== Chart positions ====
Chart (1985–1986)	Peak position
US Hot Country Songs (Billboard)	7
Canadian RPM Country Tracks	7

=== Randy Travis version ===
"It's Just a Matter of Time"

Single by Randy Travis

from the album No Holdin' Back
- B-side: "This Day Was Made for You and Me"
- Released: August 1989
- Recorded: 1989
- Genre: Country
- Length: 3:56
- Label: Warner Bros. Nashville
- Songwriters: Brook Benton; Belford Hendricks; Clyde Otis
- Producer: Richard Perry

Randy Travis singles chronology
"Promises" (1989)	"It's Just a Matter of Time" (1989)	"Hard Rock Bottom of Your Heart" (1990)

Randy Travis became the third country artist to find success with the song. Released in August 1989 as the lead-off single to the album No Holdin' Back, Travis' version became his 10th No. 1 hit on the Billboard Hot Country Singles chart.

Travis' bluesy rendition was initially recorded as part of the album Rock, Rhythm & Blues, a 10-song compilation featuring covers of 1950s-era pop hits by 1980s stars. The song was later included on No Holdin' Back after Travis and others liked what they had just recorded.

==== Chart positions ====
Chart (1989)	Peak position
Canada Country Singles (RPM)	1
US Hot Country Songs (Billboard)	1

==== Year-end charts ====
Chart (1989)	Position
Canada Country Tracks (RPM)	35
US Country Songs (Billboard)	78

== See also ==
- Randy Travis - No Holdin' Back at Billboard.com
