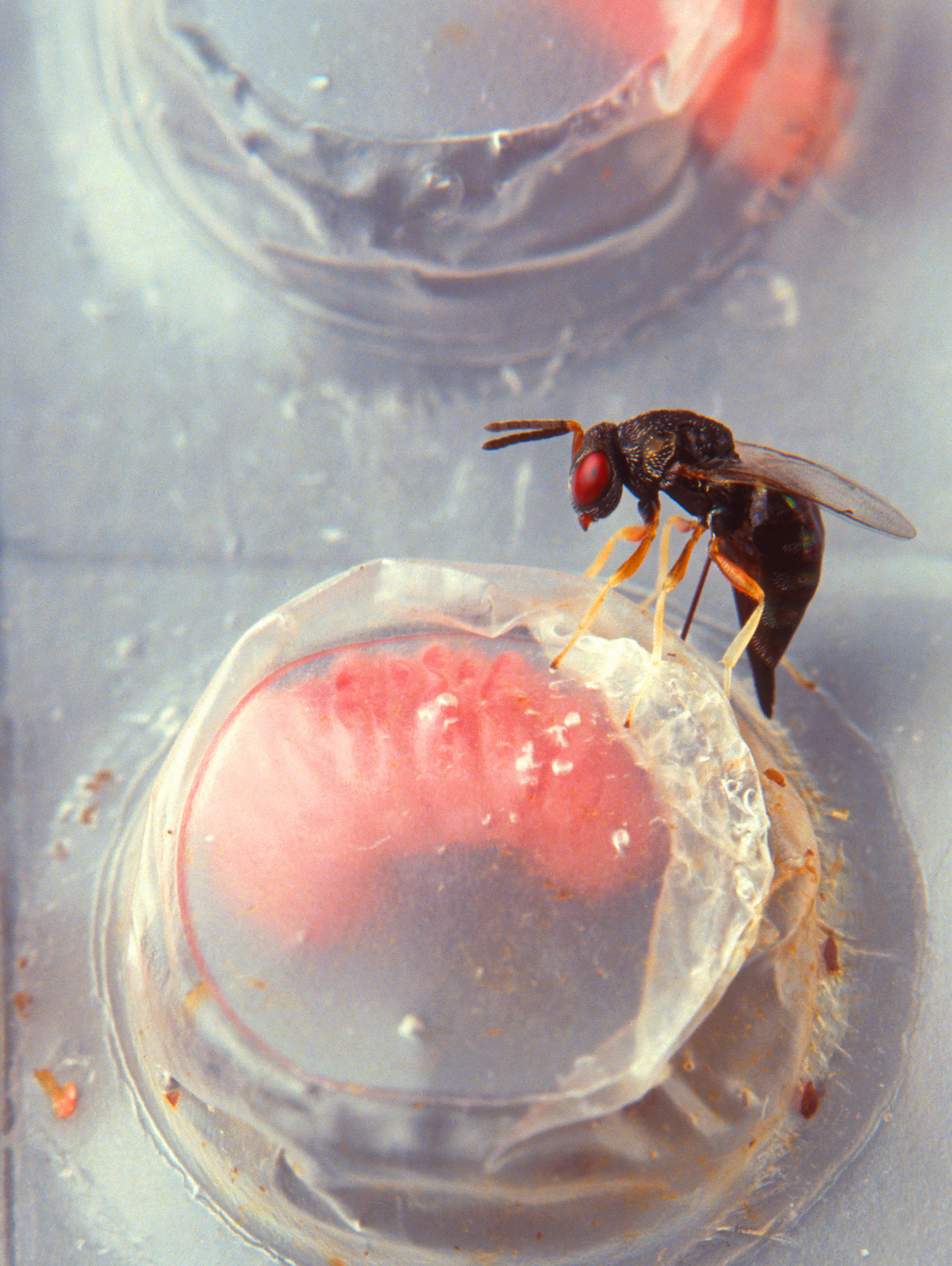
- Catolaccus grandis

Scientific classification
- Kingdom: Animalia
- Phylum: Arthropoda
- Clade: Pancrustacea
- Class: Insecta
- Order: Hymenoptera
- Family: Pteromalidae
- Genus: Catolaccus
- Species: C. grandis

Binomial name
- Catolaccus grandis (Burks 1954)

= Catolaccus grandis =

Species of wasp

Catolaccus grandis is a parasitic wasp native to southeastern Mexico. It was introduced to the United States in the 1970s.

Its natural hosts are the boll weevil (Anthonomus grandis) and the closely related Anthonomus hunteri. Its predation of the boll weevil, an economically significant pest of cotton, has led to its use as a biological control in the United States.
