= Endlessly (song) =

1959 single by Brook Benton

Single by Brook Benton

from the album Endlessly
- B-side: "So Close"
- Released: April 1959
- Genre: Soul
- Length: 2:19
- Label: Mercury
- Songwriters: Brook Benton, Clyde Otis

Brook Benton singles chronology
"It's Just a Matter of Time" (1958)	"Endlessly" (1959)	"Hurtin' Inside" (1959)

"Endlessly"

Single by Sonny James

from the album Empty Arms
- B-side: "Happy Memories"
- Released: September 1970
- Genre: Country
- Length: 2:40
- Label: Capitol
- Songwriters: Brook Benton, Clyde Otis
- Producer: George Richey

Sonny James singles chronology
"Don't Keep Me Hangin' On" (1970)	"Endlessly" (1970)	"Empty Arms" (1971)

"Endlessly" is a 1959 single by Brook Benton. The follow-up to his breakthrough hit "It's Just a Matter of Time", it reached number 12 on the Billboard Hot 100. Its B-side, "So Close", also reached the chart, peaking at number 38. "Endlessly" also was Benton's first chart success in the UK, where it reached #28.

In 1970, country singer Sonny James, who had topped the country charts with a remake of "It's Just a Matter of Time" earlier in the year, released his version of "Endlessly" as a single. It was James' sixteenth number-one song on the U.S. country singles chart. The single spent three weeks at number one and a total of fourteen weeks on the chart.

British singer Tom Jones also recorded a version, released on his 1965 debut album Along Came Jones.

== Chart performance ==
=== Brook Benton ===
Chart (1959)	Peak position
Canada CHUM Chart	11
US Billboard Hot R&B Singles	3
US Billboard Hot 100	12
UK Singles Chart	28

=== Sonny James ===
Chart (1970)	Peak position
U.S. Billboard Hot Country Singles	1
U.S. Billboard Bubbling Under Hot 100	8
Canadian RPM Country Tracks	10
