= Think Twice (Brook Benton song) =

Single by Brook Benton
- B-side: "For My Baby"
- Released: January 1961
- Recorded: 1960
- Genre: Pop
- Length: 2:30
- Label: Mercury Records
- Songwriters: Joe Shapiro, Jimmy Williams, Clyde Otis

Brook Benton singles chronology
"This Time of the Year" (1960)	"Think Twice" (1961)	"The Boll Weevil Song" (1961)

"Think Twice" is a song by Brook Benton which reached No. 11 on the Billboard Hot 100 singles chart and No. 18 in Canada in 1961. The song was written by Joe Shapiro, Jimmy Williams, and Benton's regular songwriter Clyde Otis, and was released on Mercury Records with the B-side "For My Baby" also co-written by Clyde Otis, with Willie Dixon.

The song was covered by Antoni Williams in 1962, Jackie Edwards in 1966, and Claude Powell in 1977.
