= Smooth Operator (Sarah Vaughan song) =

Single by Sarah Vaughan
- B-side: "Maybe It's Because"
- Released: 1959
- Label: Mercury
- Songwriters: Murray Stein, Clyde Otis

Professional ratings
Review scores
Source	Rating
Billboard	positive ("Spotlight" winner)

"Smooth Operator" is a song written by Murray Stein and Clyde Otis that was a hit for singer Sarah Vaughan in 1959.

== Critical reception ==
Billboard reviewed the single released by Sarah Vaughan (Mercury 71519, with "Maybe It's Because" on the flip side) in its issue from 12 October 1959, praising the song as a "snappy effort" that "Miss Vaughan sells smartly". "Both [sides] can make it," concluded the reviewer.

== Commercial performance ==
Sarah Vaughan's version reached No. 8 on Billboard's Hot R&B Sides chart and No. 44 on the Billboard Hot 100.

== Charts ==
Chart (1959)	Peak position
US Billboard Hot R&B Sides	8
US Billboard Hot 100	44
