= Boll Weevil (song) =

Blues song, notably recorded by Lead Belly and Brook Benton

"Boll Weevil" is a traditional blues song, also known by similar titles such as "Boweavil" or "Boll Weevil Blues". Many songs about the boll weevil were recorded by blues musicians during the 1920s through the 1940s. However, a rendition by Lead Belly recorded in 1934 by folklorist Alan Lomax led to it becoming well known. A 1961 adaptation by Brook Benton became a pop hit, reaching number two on the Billboard Hot 100. Fats Domino's "Bo Weevil" is a different song.

== Lyrics ==
The lyrics deal with the boll weevil (Anthonomus grandis), a beetle which feeds on cotton buds and flowers that migrated into the U.S. from Mexico in the late 19th century, and by the 1920s had infested all U.S. cotton-growing areas, causing severe devastation to the industry.

== Origins ==
"Mississippi Boweevil Blues"

Single by Charley Patton
- B-side: "Screamin' and Hollerin' the Blues"
- Released: 1929
- Recorded: June 14, 1929, Richmond, Indiana
- Genre: Delta blues
- Length: 3:09
- Label: Paramount
- Songwriter: Charlie Patton
- Producer: H.C. Spier

Charley Patton singles chronology
"Prayer of Death (Parts 1 & 2)" (1929)	"Mississippi Boweevil Blues" (1929)	"Down the Dirt Road Blues" (1929)

Perhaps as early as 1908, blues pioneer Charley Patton wrote a song called "Mississippi Boweevil Blues" and recorded it in July 1929 (as "The Masked Marvel") for Paramount Records. Some of the lyrics are similar to "Boll Weevil," describing the first time and "the next time" the narrator saw the boll weevil and making reference to the weevil's family and home. "Mother of the Blues" Ma Rainey recorded a song called "Bo-Weavil Blues" in Chicago in December 1923, and Bessie Smith covered it in 1924, but the song had little in common with Lead Belly's "Boll Weevil" aside from the subject matter.

In both Jaybird Coleman's "Boll Weevil," from the late 1920s, and Blind Willie McTell's, from the 1930s, there is an element of a dialogue between the boll weevil and a farmer. W.A. Lindsey & Alvin Condor's "Boll Weevil" recorded February 24, 1928 contains these same elements. But the first version to include all the hallmarks of the song is Lead Belly's, first recorded by Lomax on October 15, 1934, in Shreveport, Louisiana. Lead Belly re-recorded the song a number of times between 1934 and his death in 1949, with slightly different lyrics.

== Other versions ==
The following is a list of versions of the song by other artists.

- Carl Sandburg - March 4, 1926 (as "The Boll Weevil", Victor 20135)
- W.A. Lindsey & Alvin Condor - February 24, 1928 (as "Boll Weevil", available on People Take Warning! Murder Ballads and Disaster Songs, 1913-1938)
- Oscar Woods - 1940 or 1941 (as "Boll Weevil Blues")
- Woody Guthrie - 1940
- Buster Ezell - 1941
- Sid Hemphill - 1942
- Tex Ritter - 1945
- Burl Ives - 1956
- The Norman Luboff Choir - 1956
- The Weavers - 1957
- Ramblin' Jack Elliott - 1958
- Eddie Cochran - 1959
- Vera Hall - 1959/60
- Brook Benton - 1961 (as "The Boll Weevil Song")
- Connie Francis - 1961 (from Sings Folk Song Favorites, MGM Records E3969 US)
- Pink Anderson - 1961
- The Johnny Mann Singers - 1962
- Odetta - 1963
- Harry Belafonte - 1968 (released 2001)
- Shocking Blue - 1969
- Pete Seeger - 1970
- Jimmy Page - 1984
- Albert Lee - 1993
- Nashville Bluegrass Band - 1995
- Dave Van Ronk - 1996
- The White Stripes - 2001 - 2007 (performed live)
- North Mississippi Allstars - 2005 (as "Mississippi Boll Weevil")
- Old Crow Medicine Show - 2008
- The Wiggles - 2008
- Bobby Bare - 2012
- Punch Brothers - 2015
- Bill Callahan (musician) - 2022
- Jake Xerxes Fussell - 2026

=== Brook Benton version ===
"The Boll Weevil Song"

Single by Brook Benton

from the album The Boll Weevil Song and 11 Other Great Hits
- B-side: "Your Eyes"
- Released: May 1961
- Recorded: 1960
- Genre: Novelty song
- Length: 2:39
- Label: Mercury
- Songwriters: Traditional, arranged by Brook Benton, Clyde Otis
- Producer: Shelby Singleton

Brook Benton singles chronology
"Think Twice" (1961)	"The Boll Weevil Song" (1961)	"Frankie and Johnny" (1961)

The 1961 recording by American R&B singer Brook Benton was released as "The Boll Weevil Song" in an adaptation by Benton and frequent musical collaborator Clyde Otis. Considered a novelty record, it was produced by Shelby Singleton and appeared on an album called The Boll Weevil Song and 11 Other Great Hits.

Benton's recording was a hit single during the summer of 1961 and became the highest-charting single of his career on the Billboard Hot 100 chart, where the singer had eight Top 10 hits between 1959 and 1970. "The Boll Weevil Song" spent three weeks at number two on the Hot 100 chart. On the R&B chart, where Benton had enjoyed even greater success, the song also reached number two.

On the week ending July 17, 1961, Billboard Magazine debuted the "Easy Listening chart" (renamed the Adult Contemporary chart in 1979). This separate chart was created to list songs that the magazine deemed were not rock and roll records. Since the number-one song on the Hot 100 chart at the time was "Tossin' and Turnin'" by rock and roll singer Bobby Lewis, and Benton's song was not considered rock and roll by the magazine, "The Boll Weevil Song" holds the distinction of being the first number-one song on the Billboard Easy Listening chart.

In Canada the song reached number 12 and was on the chart for seven weeks.

In the UK, the song reached a peak position of number 30 on the UK Singles Chart and remained in the Top 40 for eight weeks during the summer of 1961.

The majority of the song's lyrics are spoken by Benton, as in when the farmer inquires, "Say, why'd you pick my farm?", to which the boll weevils reply, "We ain't gonna do ya much harm". The chorus of "we're lookin' for a home" was sung by Benton and the Mike Stewart Singers.

=== Eddie Cochran version ===
"Boll Weevil Song" is an adaption of the traditional blues song written by Eddie Cochran and Jerry Capehart. It was the B-side of Cochran's Liberty Records hit single "Somethin' Else" and released in July 1959.

== See also ==
- Boll weevil
- List of number-one adult contemporary singles of 1961 (U.S.)
