= Clyde Otis =

American songwriter and record producer

Background information
- Born: September 11, 1924; Prentiss, Mississippi, United States
- Died: January 8, 2008 (aged 83) Englewood, New Jersey, United States
- Occupations: Songwriter, record producer, A&R executive

Clyde Lovern Otis (September 11, 1924 – January 8, 2008) was an American songwriter and record producer, best known for his collaboration with singer Brook Benton, and for being one of the first African-American A&R executives at a major label.

According to the music licensing organization Broadcast Music, Inc., Otis is credited as the writer or co-writer of almost 800 songs.

== Early career ==
After serving in the Marines during World War II, Otis moved to New York City and inspired by fellow Marine Bobby Troup, best known for "Route 66", began writing songs. Otis' first success was Nat King Cole's recording of his song "That's All There Is to That", which reached the Billboard Top 20 in 1956.

== A&R executive ==
On joining Mercury Records as director of A&R in 1958, Otis began writing and producing material for Brook Benton. This collaboration led to "It's Just a Matter of Time", "Endlessly", "So Many Ways", "Kiddio" and the novelty song, "The Boll Weevil Song".

Otis also produced a number of duets between Benton and Dinah Washington, among them "Baby (You've Got What It Takes)" and "A Rockin' Good Way (To Mess Around and Fall in Love)"; he worked on Washington's solo efforts, as well, most notably the classic "What a Difference a Day Makes" and "This Bitter Earth".

Otis also produced hits for Sarah Vaughan ("Broken-Hearted Melody"), Timi Yuro ("Hurt") and The Diamonds ("The Stroll"), which he also co-wrote. In 1962 Otis produced 33 of Mercury's 51 chart hits.

== Clyde Otis Music Group ==
Upon leaving the label, he briefly worked at Liberty Records before founding his own publishing firm, the Clyde Otis Music Group, and moving into independent production. Relocating to Nashville, Tennessee, Otis produced sessions for country singers Charlie Rich and Sonny James. His songs have also been recorded by Elvis Presley, Aretha Franklin, Johnny Mathis, and Patti Page. In the late 1970s, he collaborated again with Brook Benton on several albums for various labels.

== Awards ==
Winner of a Grammy Award in 1994 for producing Natalie Cole's "Take a Look", Otis was given a Pioneer Award by the Rhythm and Blues Foundation in 2000.

== Personal life ==
He lived in Englewood, New Jersey, for over 40 years, and died there on January 8, 2008. He was survived by his wife, Lourdes; two sons, Isidro and Clyde III; two daughters, AnaIza and Sharon M. Brodus; and five grandchildren.

== Notable songs ==
- "Ain't That Lovin' You, Baby"
- "Any Way You Want Me"
- "Baby (You've Got What It Takes)"
- "Doncha' Think It's Time"
- "Endlessly"
- "I'm Too Far Gone (To Turn Around)"
- "It's Just a Matter of Time"
- "Kiddio"
- "Looking Back"
- "A Rockin' Good Way (to Mess Around and Fall in Love)"
- "The Stroll"
- "Thank You Pretty Baby"
- "That's All There Is to That"
- "Think Twice"
- "This Bitter Earth"
- "The Ties That Bind"
- "Till I Can't Take It Anymore"
- "The Wall"
- "Wishing It Was You"
