= Brook Benton =

American singer (1931–1988)

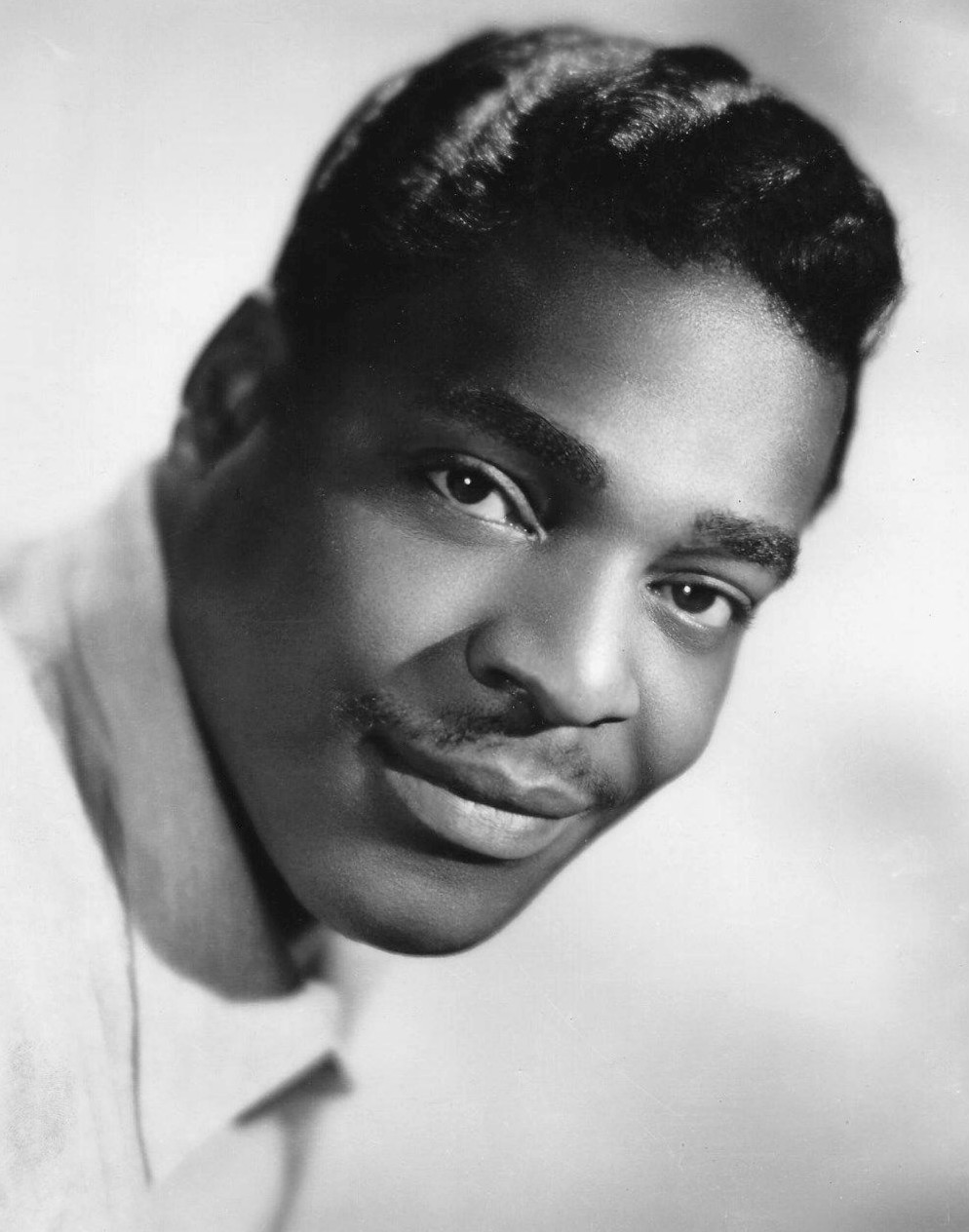
- Promotional photo of Benton (1959)

Background information
- Born: Benjamin Franklin Peay; September 19, 1931; Lugoff, South Carolina, U.S.
- Died: April 9, 1988 (aged 56) Queens, New York, U.S.
- Genres: Pop; rhythm and blues; soul
- Occupations: Singer, songwriter, actor
- Years active: 1948–1988
- Labels: Okeh, Mercury, Cotillion, RCA

Benjamin Franklin Peay (September 19, 1931 – April 9, 1988), known professionally as Brook Benton, was an American singer and songwriter whose music spanned rock and roll, rhythm and blues, and pop music genres in the 1950s and 1960s, with hits such as "It's Just a Matter of Time" and "Endlessly".

His last hit was the 1970 ballad "Rainy Night in Georgia". Benton scored more than 50 Billboard chart hits as a singer/songwriter and with compositions he wrote for other performers.

== Early life and career ==
Benton began singing gospel music in a Methodist church choir in Lugoff, South Carolina, where his father was choir master.

In 1948, Benton went to New York where he joined The Langfordaires and The Jerusalem Stars before joining The Sandmen. Epic Records signed The Sandmen in 1954, immediately sending the group to record at the Columbia studios in New York. Columbia placed The Sandmen on its Okeh Records. Upon a second recording session, Okeh decided to push Benton as a solo artist. Benton recorded his first solo, "The Kentuckian Song", the theme from a movie of the same name.

Benton switched to RCA's Vik subsidiary in 1957, where he had a single chart appearance, 1958's "A Million Miles From Nowhere", which peaked at No. 82 on U.S. charts. He wrote two songs that charted for other performers, Clyde McPhatter's "A Lover's Question" and Nat King Cole's "Looking Back".

In 1958, Benton signed with Mercury Records, where he recorded hits "It's Just A Matter Of Time", "Endlessly", "Thank You Pretty Baby", "So Many Ways", "Baby (You've Got What It Takes)", "A Rockin' Good Way" (both duets with Dinah Washington), "Kiddio", "The Boll Weevil Song", and "Hotel Happiness".

One of Benton's sisters was the original artist to record "Baby (You've Got What It Takes)", in 1958, under the title "You've Got What It Takes", using the stage name Dorothy Pay, as the B-side of her single "Strollin' with My Baby". In August 1959 Benton partnered with Dinah Washington to record the song and their version, released in January 1960, was hugely successful on both the pop and R&B charts, reaching No. 5 on the Billboard Hot 100 and No. 1 on the Hot R&B sides chart for 10 weeks, becoming one of the most successful R&B singles of the 1960s.

== Success ==
In 1959, he finally made his breakthrough with hits like "It's Just a Matter of Time" and "Endlessly". "It's Just a Matter of Time" peaked at No. 3 on the United States Billboard Hot 100 chart, sold over one million copies and was awarded a gold disc by the RIAA. "Endlessly" made it to No. 12. Both of the first two hits were written by Benton with Clyde Otis. They were originally offered to Nat King Cole, but when Otis became an A&R manager and producer at Mercury, he convinced Benton to sign with the label and record them himself, while asking Cole not to record the songs as planned. Benton followed this success with a series of hits, including "So Many Ways" (No. 6), "Hotel Happiness" (No. 3), "Think Twice" (No. 11), "Kiddio" (No. 7), and "The Boll Weevil Song" (No. 2). In 1960, he had two top 10 hit duets with Dinah Washington: "Baby (You've Got What It Takes)" (No. 5) and "A Rockin' Good Way (to Mess Around and Fall in Love)" (No. 7).

In the mid 1960s, Benton recorded for RCA Records and Reprise Records with minimal commercial success. Then, in 1968, he signed with Cotillion Records, a subsidiary of Atlantic Records, where, the following year, he enjoyed his last major hit with "Rainy Night in Georgia", written by Tony Joe White and produced and arranged by Arif Mardin, a million-seller which topped the Billboard R&B chart. Cornell Dupree played guitar on the song. Benton recorded a total of five albums with Mardin, including a gospel album, during his stay at Cotillion.

Benton eventually charted a total of 49 singles on the Billboard Hot 100, with other songs charting on Billboard's rhythm and blues, easy listening, and Christmas music charts. The last album made by Benton was Fools Rush In, which was released posthumously in 2005. He also had records released on various other labels, including All-Platinum, Brut, Olde Worlde, Stax and Groove Records.

== Death ==
Weakened from spinal meningitis, Benton died of pneumonia in Queens, New York City, at the age of 56 on April 9, 1988. He was survived by his wife, Mary Benton, and six children: Brook Jr., Vanessa, Roy, Is'real, Gerald, and Benjamin.

== Discography ==
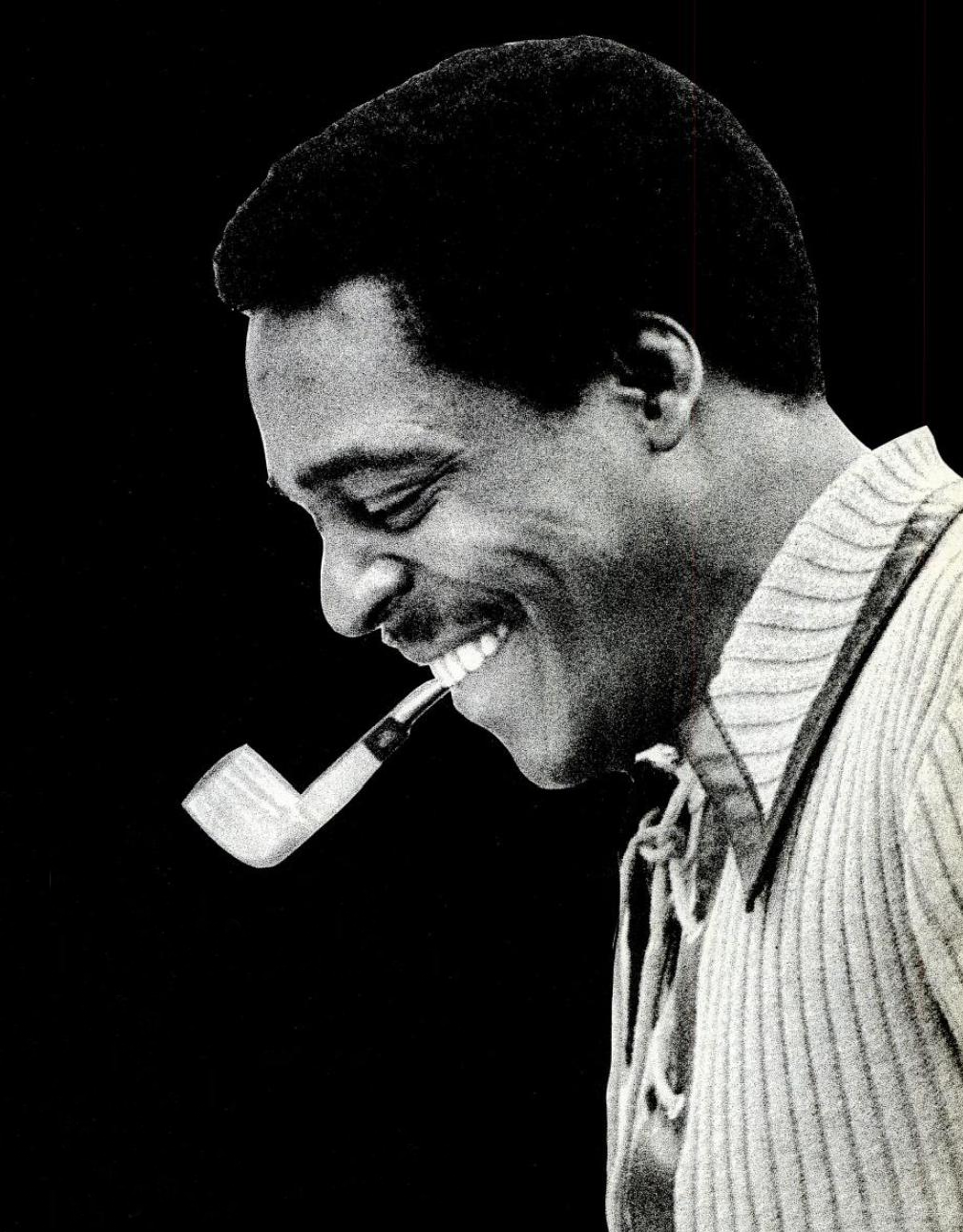
Benton in 1970

=== Albums ===
Year	Album	Peak chart positions	
Year	Album	US 200	US R&B
1959	It's Just a Matter of Time	—	—
1959	Endlessly	—	—
1960	I Love You in So Many Ways	—	—
1960	The Two of Us (with Dinah Washington)	—	—
1960	Songs I Love to Sing	—	—
1961	Golden Hits	82	—
1961	The Boll Weevil Song and 11 Other Great Hits	70	—
1962	If You Believe	77	—
1962	Singing the Blues – Lie to Me	40	—
1963	Golden Hits, Volume 2	82	—
1963	Best Ballads of Broadway	—	—
1964	Born to Sing the Blues	—	—
1964	Laura (What's He Got That I Ain't Got)	156	—
1969	Do Your Own Thing	189	—
1970	Brook Benton Today	27	4
1970	Brook Benton I Wanna Be With You	—	—
1970	Homestyle	199	—
1971	The Gospel Truth	—	—
1972	Story Teller	—	—
1973	Something for Everyone	—	—
1976	This is Brook Benton (released in the UK as "Mister Bartender")	—	—
1977	Makin' Love Is Good for You	—	—
1979	Ain't No Good	—	—
1979	So Close	—	—
1983	Beautiful memories of Christmas	—	—
1984	Soft	—	—
"—" denotes releases that did not chart or were not released in that territory.

=== Singles ===
Year	Title	Peak chart positions						Album
Year	Title	US Pop	CB Pop	US R&B	US AC	Canada	UK	Album
1955	"The Kentuckian Song" b/w "Ooh" (Non-album track)	–	–	–	–	–	–	Brook Benton at His Best!!!
1955	"Some of My Best Friends" b/w "Bring Me Love"	–	–	–	–	–	–	Brook Benton at His Best!!!
1956	"Love Made Me Your Fool" b/w "Give Me a Sign"	–	–	–	–	–	–	Brook Benton at His Best!!!
1957	"The Wall" b/w "All My Love Belongs to You" (from The Soul of Brook Benton)	–	–	–	–	–	–	Brook Benton at His Best!!!
1957	"Come On, Be Nice" b/w "I Wanna Do Everything for You" (from Brook Benton)	–	–	–	–	–	–	Non-album track
1958	"A Million Miles from Nowhere" b/w "Devoted"	82	–	–	–	–	–	Brook Benton
1959	"It's Just a Matter of Time"	3	2	1	–	6	–	It's Just a Matter of Time
1959	"Hurtin' Inside"	78	–	23	–	–	–	Golden Hits
1959	"Endlessly"	12	11	3	–	11	28	Endlessly
1959	"So Close"	38	60	5	–	–	–	I Love You In So Many Ways
1959	"Thank You Pretty Baby"	16	10	1	–	19	–	Golden Hits
1959	"With All of My Heart"	82	66	–	–	–	–	Golden Hits
1959	"So Many Ways"	6	3	1	–	18	–	I Love You In So Many Ways
1959	"I Want You Forever"	–	103	–	–	–	–	Non-album track
1959	"This Time of the Year" b/w "Nothing In The World (Could Make Me Love You More Than I Do)" (first pressings) "How Many Times" (later pressings)	66	65	12	–	–	–	Non-album tracks
1960	"Baby (You've Got What It Takes)" b/w "I Do" (Both sides with Dinah Washington)	5	2	1	–	14	–	The Two of Us
1960	"The Ties That Bind"	37	23	15	–	31	–	Golden Hits
1960	"Hither and Thither and Yon"	58	49	–	–	–	–	Golden Hits
1960	"A Rockin' Good Way (To Mess Around and Fall In Love)" b/w "I Believe" (Both sides with Dinah Washington)	7	5	1	–	17	–	The Two of Us
1960	"Kiddio"	7	3	1	–	16	41	Golden Hits
1960	"The Same One"	16	16	21	–	16	–	Golden Hits
1960	"Fools Rush In (Where Angels Fear to Tread)"	24	15	5	–	18	50	Songs I Love to Sing
1960	"Someday You'll Want Me to Want You"	93	–	–	–	–	–	Non-album track
1960	"This Time of the Year" b/w "Merry Christmas, Happy New Year"	–	–	–	–	–	–	Non-album tracks
1961	"Think Twice"	11	6	–	–	18	–	Golden Hits Volume 2
1961	"For My Baby"	28	24	2	–	18	–	Non-album track
1961	"The Boll Weevil Song"	2	2	2	1	12	30	The Boll Weevil Song
1961	"Your Eyes"	–	115	–	–	–	–	Non-album track
1961	"Frankie and Johnny"	20	16	14	6	13	–	The Boll Weevil Song
1961	"It's Just a House Without You"	45	71	–	8	13	–	Golden Hits Volume 2
1961	"Revenge" b/w "Really, Really" (Non-album track)	15	16	12	–	–	–	Golden Hits Volume 2
1962	"Shadrack"	19	29	–	–	4	–	If You Believe
1962	"The Lost Penny"	77	94	–	–	4	–	If You Believe
1962	"Walk on the Wild Side" b/w "Somewhere in the Used to Be" (Non-album track)	43	42	–	–	33	–	Golden Hits Volume 2
1962	"Hit Record"	45	36	19	–	34	–	Golden Hits Volume 2
1962	"Thanks to the Fool"	106	86	–	–	–	–	Non-album track
1962	"Lie to Me"	13	10	3	–	36	–	Singing the Blues
1962	"With the Touch of Your Hand"	120	126	–	–	–	–	Non-album track
1962	"Still Waters Run Deep"	89	81	–	–	–	–	Golden Hits Volume 2
1963	"Hotel Happiness"	3	6	2	–	–	–	Golden Hits Volume 2
1963	"I Got What I Wanted"	28	22	4	14	39	–	Singing the Blues
1963	"Dearer Than Life"	59	72	–	–	–	–	Non-album track
1963	"My True Confession"	22	29	7	8	–	–	Singing The Blues
1963	"Tender Years"	–	87	–	–	–	–	Singing The Blues
1963	"Two Tickets to Paradise" b/w "Don't Hate Me"	32	30	15	8	–	–	Non-album tracks
1963	"Baby, You've Got It Made" (w/ Damita Jo)	111	133	–	–	–	–	Non-album tracks
1963	"Stop Foolin'" (w/ Damita Jo)	108	87	–	–	–	–	Non-album tracks
1963	"You're All I Want for Christmas" b/w "This Time of the Year"	–	59	–	–	–	–	Non-album tracks
1964	"Going Going Gone" b/w "After Midnight"(from Born to Sing the Blues)	35	30	5	11	–	–	On the Countryside
1964	"Another Cup of Coffee"	47	40	4	13	–	–	Non-album track
1964	"Too Late to Turn Back Now"	43	38	8	14	–	–	This Bitter Earth
1964	"A House Is Not a Home" b/w "Come On Back"	75	50	6	13	–	–	Non-album tracks
1964	"Lumberjack" b/w "Don't Do What I Did (Do What I Say)"	53	47	11	15	–	–	This Bitter Earth
1964	"Do It Right"	67	58	33	–	–	–	This Bitter Earth
1964	"Please, Please Make It Easy"	119	–	–	–	–	–	This Bitter Earth
1965	"The Special Years" b/w "Where There's a Will (There's a Way")	129	109	–	–	–	–	Non-album tracks
1965	"Love Me Now" b/w "A Sleepin' at the Foot of the Bed"	100	97	–	37	–	–	Non-album tracks
1965	"Mother Nature, Father Time" b/w "While There's Life (There's Still Hope)"	53	43	26	9	27	–	Mother Nature, Father Time
1966	"Only a Girl Like You" b/w "While There's Life (There's Still Hope)"	122	102	–	–	–	–	Non-album tracks
1966	"Too Much Good Lovin'" b/w "A Sailor Boy's Love Song"	126	–	–	–	–	–	Non-album tracks
1966	"Break Her Heart" b/w "In the Evening by Moonlight"	–	–	–	37	–	–	Non-album tracks
1966	"If Only You Knew" b/w "So True in Life, So True in Love"	–	–	–	–	–	–	Non-album tracks
1966	"Our First Christmas Together" b/w "Silent Night"	–	–	–	–	–	–	Non-album tracks
1967	"All My Love Belongs to You" b/w "Wake Up"	–	–	–	–	–	–	Non-album tracks
1967	"Keep the Faith, Baby" b/w "Going to Soulsville"	–	–	–	–	–	–	Non-album tracks
1967	"Laura (What's He Got That I Ain't Got)" b/w "You're the Reason I'm Living"	78	88	–	37	–	–	Laura, What's He Got That I Ain't Got
1968	"Weakness in a Man" b/w "The Glory of Love" (from Laura, What's He Got That I Ain't Got)	–	–	–	36	–	–	Non-album tracks
1968	"Lonely Street" b/w "Instead (of Loving You)"	–	–	–	–	–	–	Non-album tracks
1968	"Do Your Own Thing" b/w "I Just Don't Know What to Do with Myself"	99	128	–	26	–	–	Non-album tracks
1969	"Touch 'Em with Love" b/w "She Knows What to Do for Me"	–	–	–	–	–	–	Non-album tracks
1969	"Nothing Can Take the Place of You" b/w "Woman Without Love"	74	67	11	–	68	–	Non-album tracks
1970	"Rainy Night in Georgia" b/w "Where Do I Go from Here"	4	2	1	2	2	–	Brook Benton Today
1970	"My Way" b/w "A Little Bit of Soap"	72	48	25	35	49	–	Brook Benton Today
1970	"Don't It Make You Want to Go Home" b/w "I've Gotta Be Me" (from Brook Benton Today)	45	48	31	4	41	–	Home Style
1971	"Shoes" b/w "Let Me Fix It" (from Home Style)	67	52	18	18	83	–	Story Teller
1971	"Heaven Help Us All" b/w "Whoever Finds This (I Love You)" (from Home Style)	–	120	–	–	–	–	The Gospel Truth
1971	"Take a Look at Your Hands" b/w "If You Think God Is Dead"	–	–	–	–	–	–	The Gospel Truth
1971	"Please Send Me Someone to Love" b/w "She Even Woke Me Up to Say Goodbye"	–	–	–	–	–	–	Story Teller
1971	"A Black Child Can't Smile" b/w "If You Think God Is Dead" (from The Gospel Truth)	–	–	–	–	–	–	Non-album tracks
1971	"Soul Santa" b/w "Let Us All Get Together with the Lord" (from The Gospel Truth)	–	–	–	–	–	–	Non-album tracks
1972	"Movin' Day" b/w "Poor Make Believer"	–	–	–	–	–	–	Story Teller
1972	"If You Got the Time" b/w "You Take Me Home Honey"	104	–	–	–	–	–	Something for Everyone
1973	"Lay Lady Lay" b/w "A Touch of Class"	–	107	–	–	–	–	Non-album tracks
1974	"South Carolina" b/w "All That Love Went to Waste"	–	–	–	–	–	–	Non-album tracks
1976	"Can't Take My Eyes Off You" b/w "Weekend with Feathers"	–	–	–	–	–	–	This Is Brook Benton
1978	"Making Love Is Good for You" b/w "Better Times"	–	–	49	–	–	–	Makin' Love Is Good for You
1978	"Soft" b/w "Glow Love"	–	–	–	–	–	–	Soft
"–" denotes releases that did not chart or were not released in that territory.
