= Rosie Flores discography =

- Studio albums: 14
- Compilation albums: 2
- Singles: 9

Rosie Flores is an American singer, songwriter and musician. Her discography consists of fourteen studio albums, two compilations, and nine singles. In addition, she has been featured as a performer and composer on numerous albums by other artists.

== Albums ==
Year	Album	US Country	Label	Notes
1987	Rosie Flores	67	Reprise	
1992	After the Farm		HighTone	
1993	Once More with Feeling		HighTone	
1995	Rockabilly Filly		HighTone	
1997	A Little Bit of Heartache		Watermelon	with Ray Campi
1999	Dance Hall Dreams		Rounder	
2001	Speed of Sound		Eminent	
2004	Bandera Highway		HighTone	
2004	Single Rose		Durango Rose	
2005	Christmasville		Emergent	
2009	Girl of the Century		Bloodshot	with The Pine Valley Cosmonauts
2012	Working Girl's Guitar		Bloodshot	
2019	Simple Case of the Blues			
2025	Impossible Frontiers		Mule Kick	

== Compilations ==
Year	Album	US Country	Label	Notes
1996	A Honky Tonk Reprise		Rounder	Reissue of Rosie Flores album with previously unreleased tracks
2011	After the Farm / Once More With Feeling		Floating World	compilation of two previously released albums

== Singles ==
Year	Single	Peak positions	Album	Label	Notes
Year	Single	US Country	Album	Label	Notes
1982	"Hit City L.A." / "Oh Heartache"	—	—N/a	Request	
1986	"I'm Walkin'" / "The End Of The World"	—	—N/a	Reprise	
1987	"Heart Beats To A Different Drum" / "Somebody Loses, Somebody Wins"	—	Rosie Flores	Reprise	
1987	"Crying Over You"	—	Rosie Flores	Reprise	promo
1987	"Somebody Loses, Somebody Wins"	—	Rosie Flores	Reprise	promo
1987	"Crying Over You" / "Midnight To Moonlight"	51	Rosie Flores	Reprise	
1988	"One Track Memory / He Cares"	74	A Honky Tonk Reprise	Reprise	
1988	"Brand New Heartache" / "Lonesome Town"	—	—N/a	Lonesome Town	with Ronnie Mack
1993	"Honky Tonk Moon"	—	Once More with Feeling	Hightone	
"—" denotes releases that did not chart

== Music videos ==
Year	Video	Director
1987	"Crying Over You"	
1992	"Blue Highway"	Eugene Yelchin
1993	"Honky Tonk Moon"	Roger Pistole
2010	"This Cat's In The Doghouse"	
2013	"Yeah Yeah"	

== Primary artist/contributor ==
=== 1985 - 1999 ===
- 1985: various artists - A Town South of Bakersfield (Enigma) - track 1, "Heartbreak Train" (with Albert Lee)
- 1988: various artists - A Christmas Tradition, Volume II (Warner Bros.) - track 1, "Rockin' Around the Christmas Tree"
- 1992: various artists - Cause (Piece Of Mind) - track 10, "Lucky Lady" - spoken word performance
- 1993: various artists - Rig Rock Deluxe (A Musical Salute To The American Truck Driver) (Upstart) - track 16, "Six Days on the Road"
- 1993: various artists - Absolutt Beat Vol.1 (Absolutt Gratis) (Beat) - track 17, "Love And Danger" (with Joe Ely)
- 1994: various artists - Tulare Dust : A Songwriter's Tribute To Merle Haggard (Hightone) - track 7, "My Own Kind Of Hat"
- 1995: various artists - South by Southwest Live Vol.3 (SXSW) - track 4, "Tumblin' Down"
- 1996: various artists - Mixx on the Fly - Live from Studio A WCBE Vol. 4 (WCBE) - track 8, "Cryin Over You"

=== 2000 - present ===
- 2000: various artists - Seka ["Sister"] Vol. 2 (Twah!) - track 6, "We'll Survive"
- 2002: Jon Langford and the Pine Valley Cosmonauts - The Executioner's Last Songs Volume 1 (Bloodshot) - track 2, "I'll Never Get Out Of This World Alive"
- 2002: various artists - KGSR Broadcasts Vol. 10 (KGSR) - track 2-16, "Ballad of the Sun and the Moon" (with Alejandro Escovedo)
- 2002: various artists - The Bottle Let Me Down: Songs for Bumpy Wagon Rides (Bloodshot) - track 1, "Red, Red Robin"
- 2002: various artists - Dressed in Black: A Tribute to Johnny Cash (Dualtone) - track 10, "Big River"
- 2003: various artists - Light Of Day: A Tribute To Bruce Springsteen (Schoolhouse) - track 2-07, "Lucky Town"
- 2004: various artists - Hard-Headed Woman: A Celebration of Wanda Jackson (Bloodshot) - track 10, "In The Middle Of A Heartache"- track 2-07. "Lucky Town"
- 2004: various artists - Por Vida: A Tribute to the Songs of Alejandro Escovedo (Or Music) - track 2-07, "Inside This Dance"
- 2011: various artists - This One's for Him: A Tribute to Guy Clark (Icehouse) - track 1-08, "Baby Took A Limo To Memphis"
- 2014: various artists - Rockin' Legends Pay Tribute to Jack White (Cleopatra) - track 10, "Blunderbuss"

== As composer ==
- 1984: ¡Screamin' Sirens! - ¡Fiesta! (Enigma) - track 2, "Maniac"; track 6, "Midnight To Moonlight"
- 1985: various artists - The Enigma Variations (Enigma) - track 1, "Maniac"
- 2007: Lucky Tomblin - Red Hot from Blue Rock (Texas World) - track 5, "Don't Forget to Dip the Girl"
- 2009: Rick Shea - Shelter Valley Blues - (Tres Pescadores) - track 7, "Sweet Little Pocha" (co-written with Rick Shea)
- 2010: Patricia Vonne - Worth It (Measured) - track 2, "Cut From The Same Cloth"
- 2011: David Wood - Country (Dew Note) - track 4, "Following a Full Moon" (co-written with Alan Laney and Bill C. Graham)
- 2012: Cathy Faber - Rattle My Cage (self-released) - track 5, "Honky-Tonk Moon"
- 2013: Patricia Vonne - Rattle My Cage (Bandolera) - track 5, "This Cat's In The Doghouse"
- 2015: Stephen R. Cheney - "I'm Just Lucky" (Capitol Records|Capitol / Universal) - track 16, "Midnight to Moonlight" (co-written with James Intveld)

== As producer ==
- 2012: Janis Martin - The Blanco Sessions (Cow Island)

== Also appears on ==
=== 1984 - 1999 ===
- 1979: Juice Newton - Take Heart (Capitol) - vocals
- 1984: ¡Screamin' Sirens! - ¡Fiesta! (Enigma) - guitar, vocals
- 1988: Joe Ely - Dig All Night (HighTone / Shout!) - vocals
- 1990: Jann Browne - Tell Me Why (Curb) - vocals
- 1991: Marshall Crenshaw - Life's Too Short (MCA) - vocals
- 1991: Will T. Massey - Will T. Massey (MCA) - vocals
- 1992: Tom Russell - Box of Visions (Philo) - vocals
- 1994: Dave Alvin - King of California (Hightone) - vocals on track 4, "Goodbye Again"
- 1994: Midnight To Six - Tighten Up! (Fun Key) - vocals
- 1996: Country Dick Montana - The Devil Lied To Me (Bar/None) - lead guitar, vocals
- 1996: Bob Neuwirth - Look Up (Watermelon) - vocals
- 1996: Texas Tornados - 4 Aces (Reprise) - vocals on track 12, "The One I Love The Most"
- 1997: Terry Clarke - The Heart Sings (Transatlantic) - vocals on track 4, "Back to the Well"
- 1998: Howe Gelb - Hisser (V2) - vocals on track 21, "Cracklin' Water"
- 1998: The Wandering Eyes - Sing Songs of Forbidden Love (Lazy S.O.B.) - vocals

=== 2000 - present ===
- 2002: Alejandro Escovedo - By the Hand of The Father (Texas Music Group) - vocals on track 5, "Ballad of the Sun and the Moon"
- 2003: Wanda Jackson - Heart Trouble (Sympathy for the Record Industry) - vocals
- 2004: Gin Palace Jesters - Honkytonk Fools (Rhythm Bomb) - vocals on track 5, "Lover Not A Fighter"
- 2006: Dave Insley - Here with You Tonight (self-released) - vocals, duet
- 2006: Charlie Louvin - Echoes of the Louvin Brothers (Varèse Sarabande) - vocals
- 2006: Spicewood Seven - Kakistocracy (Austin)- vocals
- 2007: $olal - The Moonshine Sessions (¡Ya Basta!) - vocals on track 10, "Pretty Vacant"
- 2008: Katy Moffatt - Playin' Fool: Live In Holland (Strictly Music) - vocals, guest artist
- 2009: Tish Hinojosa - Our Little Planet (Varèse Sarabande) - vocals on track 5, "We Mostly Feel That Way"
