= Blood on the Saddle =

US country punk band

- Origin: Los Angeles, California, United States
- Genres: Cowpunk
- Years active: 1983–present
- Labels: New Alliance; Chameleon; MCA; New Rose Records; Stiff; SST; Semaphore; Schemer; One Million Dollar Records; Kill Rock Stars; Last Call (label)
- Members: Greg Davis; Dave Frappier; Al Garcia
- Past members: Annette Zilinskas; Herman Senac; Ron Botelho; Ceasar Viscarra; Dave Shollenbarger; Chris Engel; Danny Rickard; John Stephenson; Michael Hately; Billy Koepke; Eric Davis; John Stephenson; Dave Frappier; Ed Marshall; Jose Levato; Kevin Keller; Al Garcia; Eddie Rojas; Keith Comey
- Website: www.bloodonthesaddle.com

Blood on the Saddle are an American country-punk band, though often referred to as a cowpunk band, from Los Angeles, California, United States. Greg Davis (vocals, guitar) formed the band in early 1983 with the original line-up of Ron Botelho (upright bass, bass) and Hermann Senac (drums, vocals). Annette Zilinskas (vocals, guitar) joined in the summer of 1983. They released three albums and songs on one compilation before that line-up broke up in 1987. Band leader Greg Davis has continued the band to present day, with one break to work with The Vandals and Candye Kane. Eventually the band recorded two more EPs and six more albums, getting three of them out officially, which were released in 1993, 1995, and 2001, respectively. A fourth album, The Mud, the Blood & the Beer, was recorded in 2008 and released to all digital platforms in 2020. A fifth album, True Blood, was recorded in 2013, and has been available since 2019 on all digital platforms.

== History ==
Blood on the Saddle began as a musical idea in 1981 while Greg Davis was playing guitar in a Hollywood punk rock band called Dead Hippie. He saw Gun Club play with the Cramps and X and was inspired by their intense fusion of Delta blues with punk rock. He met Annette Zilinskas at a Blasters gig and they began singing Johnny Cash-June Carter style duets together. Annette was playing bass in a 1960s band called the Bangs and they used to listen to DJ Rodney Bingenheimer play their respective bands on his KROQ radio show. In 1982, Davis moved to New Orleans and played dobro in a bluegrass duo on Bourbon Street while Zilinskas continued to play bass in the ever more successful Bangs. Davis then stayed in Nashville for awhile absorbing traditional country music in the lower Broad district before moving back to Hollywood, to form a band whose purpose was to violently fuse traditional American music with punk rock.

In early 1983, Davis began rehearsing at Hully Gully studio with Ron Botelho on upright bass and Hermann Senac on drums and vocals. It was Senac's idea to name the band after the traditional cowboy song that an animatronic bear named Big Al sang in the Country Bear Jamboree at Disneyland. They started playing shows as a trio while Zilinskas was on tour in the re-named Bangles. When she returned she joined Davis singing in the band. In summer 1983, the Bangles signed to CBS, while Zilinskas chose to sing and also play guitar and harmonica in Blood on the Saddle. They played more and more shows around Los Angeles, while KROQ played their songs on the radio.

In early 1984, the band contributed two songs to the Enigma Records compilation album Hell Comes To Your House. This was followed by their self-titled debut album Blood On The Saddle on the Minutemen's New Alliance label, produced in part by Chris D. of the Flesheaters. Davis and Zilinskas signed a publishing deal with Peer/Southern and the band spent the rest of the year touring America and Canada.

In 1985, Blood on the Saddle was provisionally signed to MCA Records, but after six months their demo was rejected. The band continued playing shows in California while recording their second album Poison Love. This was released in early 1986 on Chameleon in North America, Stiff and New Rose Records in the UK and Europe, respectively. This was followed by tours of America, Canada, the UK and Europe for the rest of 1986. Poison Love, was finally released in early 1986, on the US based Chameleon label and the New Rose label in Europe.

In early 1987, the band recorded with engineer/producer Dan Matovina and Ethan James what was to be the original line-up's third and last album Fresh Blood. This was released in North America and on New Rose in Europe, but the band had broken up by that time. Disappointing sales led to the band breaking up, with Davis forming a new band The Drivers and Senac joining The Loafin' Hyenas followed by Crowbar Salvation and The Guilty Hearts. Botelho next worked with Bobbi Bratt.

Davis continued to perform with Blood on the Saddle, bringing in varying lineups of musicians, including former Stains/DC3 bassist Ceasar Viscarra and drummer Dave Shollenbarger (Steve Jones), with the band splitting in late 1988. Blood on the Saddle was on hiatus in 1989 and 1990 while Davis played as a tour guitar player for So Cal punk rock band The Vandals, then a run with country-swing singer, Candye Kane.

In 1990, Davis formed a new line-up of Blood on the Saddle with Chris Engel (bass) and Danny Rickard (drums). Engel died in 1991. In 1992, Davis recruited drummer John Stephenson (Nip Drivers) and then Michael Hately on bass. In 1992, bass player Caeser Viscarra re-joined the band for shows in Los Angeles.

In 1993, with drummer Eric Davis and bassist Billy Koepke (Legal Weapon, Tex and the Horseheads) the band recorded their fourth album More Blood. It was released in Europe on Schemer Records/ a subsidiary label of Semaphore Records. The band toured in Europe to promote it.

In 1994, bassist John Stephenson and drummer Dave Frappier rejoined the band and they spent several months touring in Europe. An EP of songs was recorded in Los Angeles and released as 4 Song 7 EP followed by the songs on the Some Songs various artists compilation, both released on the Kill Rock Stars label. In August 1994, while in Europe, they recorded in Amsterdam what was to be their fifth album titled New Blood with the EP songs added. In 1995, this was released and distributed in Europe by Last Call Records along with a release by Rebel Records in Germany. The line-up then toured Europe again in late 1994 and 1995.

In 1997, bassist Ed Marshall joined the band and they contributed four songs to the German label One Million Dollar Records compilation album entitled It Came From the Barn. Jose Levato (Top Jimmy and the Rhythm Pigs) played bass live for the remainder of 1998 and 1999.

In 1999, an album Flesh & Blood was recorded by the line-up of Greg Davis, Dave Frappier and Ed Marshall; released in 2001 on CD and vinyl by One Million Dollar Records out of Germany. In 2001 and 2002, Blood on the Saddle toured Europe again with new bassist/vocalist Kevin Keller. In 2002, original vocalist Annette Zilinskas did several shows with the band in the U.S. In 2005, the band recorded tracks for a currently unreleased album Blood Alcohol, with a planned digital release in 2020.

In 2006, original vocalist Zilinskas did more shows with the band in the U.S.

In 2007 bassist Al Garcia joined the band and in 2008 they toured the West Coast to Canada and back and in 2008 they recorded an album The Mud, the Blood and the Beer, but it was unreleased at the time. In 2009, there was no band activity. In 2010, Davis re-constituted the band with bassist/vocalist Robby Tavares and drummer Eddie Rojas.

In 2012, new drummer Keith Comey joined the band and, in 2013, they recorded their ninth album, True Blood, in Oceanside California with Thomas Yearsley (the Paladins) producing. It was officially released on all digital platforms in 2019. In 2018, the band was re-constituted with former drummer David Frappier and former bassist John Stephenson. Bassist Ceaser Viscarra then returned in 2019 to be followed by bassist Al Garcia at present.

In 2019, the first three Blood on the Saddle albums; the 1995 album New Blood and the latest recording from 2012 True Blood were all released on all digital platforms. In 2020, the previously unreleased album The Mud, the Blood & the Beer was released on all digital platforms.

== Members ==
Current

- Greg Davis – guitar (1981–present)
- Dave Frappier – drums (1994–2008, 2018–present)
- Al Garcia – bass (2007–2008, 2019–present)

Former

- Annette Zilinskas - vocals, guitar (1982–1987)
- Herman Senac - drums, vocals (1983-1987)
- Ron Botelho - bass, vocals (1983-1987)
- Ceaser Viscarra - bass (1988, 1992, 2019)
- Dave Shollenbarger - drums (1988)
- Chris Engel - bass (1990-1991)
- Danny Rickard - drums (1991-1992)
- John Stephenson - bass (1991, 1994-1995)
- Michael Hately - bass (1992)
- Billy Koepke - bass (1993)
- Eric Davis (dcsd.) - drums (1993)
- John Stephenson - bass (1994)
- Dave Frappier - drums (1994)
- Ed Marshall - bass (1997)
- Jose Levato (deceased) - bass (1998-1999)
- Kevin Keller - bass (2001)
- Al Garcia - bass (2007)
- Eddie Rojas - drums (2010-2011)
- Robby Tavares - (2010-2013)
- Keith Comey - drums (2012–2013)

== Discography ==
=== Albums ===
- Blood on the Saddle (1984), New Alliance
- Poison Love (1986), Chameleon
- Fresh Blood (1987), SST
- Cold-Blooded (recorded 1988 - unreleased)
- More Blood (1993), Semaphore
- New Blood (1995), Last Call
- Flesh and Blood (2001), One Million Dollar Records
- Blood Alcohol (recorded 2005 - unreleased)
- The Mud, The Blood and the Beer (2020),(recorded 2008)
- True Blood (2019), (recorded 2013)

=== EPs ===
- 4 Song 7" (1994), Kill Rock Stars

=== Compilation albums ===
- Hell Comes to Your House vol. 2 (1984), Enigma
- Some Songs (1997), Kill Rock Stars
- It Came From the Barn vol. 2 (1997) One Million Dollar Records

External Links
