= Stop Pretending =

Stop Pretending may refer to:

- Stop Pretending, a 1940 single by The Ink Spots
- Stop Pretending (album), a 1986 album by The Pandoras
- Stop Pretending: What Happened When My Big Sister Went Crazy, a 1999 novel in verse by Sonya Sones
