= After the Farm =

Studio album by Rosie Flores
- Released: March 18, 1992
- Recorded: February 24 – March 10, 1991
- Studio: Mad Dog Studios, Venice, CA
- Genre: Country rock
- Length: 38:15
- Label: HighTone Records
- Producer: Dusty Wakeman; Greg Leisz

Rosie Flores chronology
Rosie Flores (1987)	After the Farm (1992)	Once More with Feeling (1993)

After the Farm is the second studio album by Rosie Flores. It was released by HighTone Records on March 18, 1992.

== Musical style ==
Kevin Ransom of Guitar Player called the record "a tough-minded three-guitar country-rock showcase that uses The Byrds and Buffalo Springfield as musical touchstones."

== Critical reception ==
Professional ratings
Review scores
Source	Rating
AllMusic	4/5 stars
Robert Christgau	A-

Chip Renner of AllMusic writes, "From start to finish, there is something special about this CD." He finishes his review with, "They rock, with some real killer slide-guitar work. If you like your country hard, you'll love it."

Robert Christgau gives the album an A− and says, "the catch in her voice has gotten so husky you want to give her a squeeze, and she writes more good songs about the usual thing than any of the young hunks who've given Nashville delusions of grandeur."

On this album, Musician reviewer Peter Cronin noted, "Flores is playing more guitar and writing better songs than on her ill-fated Warner Bros., debut. Most importantly, the singer sounds like she's having a blast."

== Track listing ==
All tracks are written by Rosie Flores, co-writers as listed below.

No.	Title	Writer(s)	Length
1.	"More to Offer"	Guy Clark	3:44
2.	"Price You Pay"	Roger Flores	3:42
3.	"Blue Highway"	Pat Gallagher	2:48
4.	"This Loneliness"		4:29
5.	"Sold on You"	Duane Jarvis	3:44
6.	"That's Me"	James Intveld	2:29
7.	"Goin' Through the Motions"	Rachel Gladstone	3:12
8.	"Oh Heartache"		3:54
9.	"Dream Dream Blue"	Roger Flores	3:23
10.	"Dent in My Heart"	Jimmie Dale Gilmore	3:10
11.	"West Texas Plains"	Leroy Preston	3:40
Total length:			38:15

Track information and credits adapted from the album's liner notes.

== Musicians ==
- Rosie Flores – Lead Vocals, Electric Guitar
- Dusty Wakeman – Bass, Backing Vocals
- Donald Lindley – Drums, Percussion
- Duane Jarvis – Electric Guitar
- Greg Leisz – Electric Guitar, Acoustic Guitar, Backing Vocals, Lap Steel Guitar
- Jim Lauderdale – Harmony Vocals (track 10)

== Production ==
- Dusty Wakeman – Producer, Engineer, Recorded By, Mixed By
- Greg Leisz – Producer
- Michael Dumas – Engineer, Recorded By
- Eddy Schreyer – Mastered By
- Tom Green – Recording Assistant
- Kathren Dettling – Hair
- Constance Damron – Make-up
- Mari Yoneda – Art Direction/Design
- Susan Maljan – Photography/Art Direction

== Dedication ==
- This recording is dedicated to the memory of Stevie Ray Vaughan.
