= Rosie Flores (album) =

Studio album by Rosie Flores
- Released: September 1, 1987 (1987 album); June 4, 1996 (1996 reissue)
- Genre: Country
- Length: 29:32 (1987 album); 47:43 (1996 reissue)
- Label: Reprise (1987 album); Rounder (1996 reissue)
- Producer: Pete Anderson (tracks 1-10); Steve Fishell (tracks 11, 12, 16); Howie Epstein (tracks 11, 12, 16); Ray Baker (tracks 13, 14); Paul Worley (track 15)

Rosie Flores chronology
Rosie Flores (1987)	After the Farm (1992)

Rosie Flores is the self-titled debut studio album by American country music singer-songwriter Rosie Flores. It was released on September 1, 1987, via Reprise Records. It is Flores' only charting album peaking at number 62 on the Billboard Top Country Albums chart. A reissue of the album retitled A Honky Tonk Reprise was released on June 4, 1996, via Rounder Records, which also features some previous unreleased tracks.

== Critical reception ==
In a review for the album for AllMusic, Brian Mansfield described Rosie Flores' debut as "the female answer to Dwight Yoakam."

== Track listing ==
No.	Title	Writer(s)	Length
1.	"Crying Over You"	James Intveld	3:48
2.	"Midnight to Moonlight"	Rosie Flores, Intveld	3:45
3.	"Lovin' in Vain"	Freddie Hart	2:11
4.	"God May Forgive You (But I Won't)"	Harlan Howard, Bobby Braddock	3:00
5.	"Heart Beats to a Different Drum"	Flores	2:16
6.	"The Blue Side of Town"	Paul Kennerley, Hank DeVito	3:39
7.	"Somebody Loses, Somebody Wins"	Alan Laney, Bill Graham, Ron Coleman	2:29
8.	"Heartbreak Train"	Pleasant Gehman, Albert Lee, Flores	3:04
9.	"Turn Around"	Carl Perkins	2:45
10.	"I Gotta Know"	Thelma Blackmon	2:35
Total length:			29:32

Bonus tracks on A Honky Tonk Reprise
No.	Title	Writer(s)	Length
11.	"The End of the World"	Sylvia Dee, Arthur Kent	3:05
12.	"Truck Driver's Blues"	Ted Daffan	2:51
13.	"One Track Memory"	Charlie Black, Steve Bogard, Tommy Rocco	3:06
14.	"He Cares"	Paul Overstreet, Don Schlitz	3:19
15.	"Woman Walk Out the Door"	Flores, DeVito	3:21
16.	"I'm Walking"	Fats Domino, Dave Bartholomew	2:29
Total length:			47:43

== Personnel ==
Compiled from liner notes.

Musicians on tracks 1–10

- Rosie Flores - vocals, harmony vocals, acoustic guitar, electric guitar solos on "I Gotta Know" and "Heartbreak Train"
- Greg Leisz - pedal steel, lap steel, dobro
- Donald Lindley - drums
- James Intveld - electric bass, upright bass, 6 string bass, harmony vocals
- Billy Bremner - electric guitar
- Pete Anderson - electric guitar, acoustic guitar, click bass, mandola
- Jeff Donovan - drums on "Crying Over You"
- Don Reed - fiddle
- Tom Brumley - pedal steel on "God May Forgive You (But I Won't)"
- Skip Edwards - piano
- David Hidalgo - accordion on "Midnight to Moonlight"

Musicians on "The End of the World"

- Leisz - electric guitar, acoustic guitar
- Don Heffington - drums
- Steve Fishell - pedal steel
- Glen Hardin - piano
- Albert Lee - mandolin
- Howie Epstein - electric bass

Musicians on "Truck Driver's Blues"

- Flores - electric rhythm guitar
- Heffington - drums
- Fishell - pedal steel
- Hardin - piano
- Bremner - electric lead guitar
- Roly Salley - electric bass

Musicians on "One Track Memory" and "He Cares"

- Mark O'Connor - fiddle
- Eddie Bayers - drums
- Weldon Myrick - pedal steel
- Brent Rowan - electric lead guitar
- Mark Casstevens - acoustic guitar
- Ronald Hughes - bass
- Gary Prim - keyboards

Musicians on "Woman Walk Out the Door"

- Flores - electric rhythm guitar
- Leisz - lap steel guitar
- Lindley - drums
- John Jorgenson - electric lead guitar
- Mike Brignardello - electric bass
- Harry Stinson - backing vocals
- Paul Worley - acoustic guitar

Musicians on "I'm Walkin'"

- Flores - electric rhythm guitar
- Lee - electric lead guitar
- Epstein - electric bass
- Heffington - drums
- Leisz - acoustic guitar
- Hardin - piano
- Fishell - pedal steel

Technical

- Pete Anderson - production
- Steve Fishell - production
- Howie Epstein - production
- Ray Baker - production
- Paul Worley - production
- Dusty Wakeman - engineering, mixing
- Eddie Shreyer - mastering

== Chart performance ==
Chart (1987)	Peak position
US Top Country Albums (Billboard)	62
