= List of Dutch Top 40 number-one singles of 1968 =

These hits topped the Dutch Top 40 in 1968.

Issue Date	Song	Artist(s)	Reference
6 January	"Hello, Goodbye"	The Beatles	
13 January	"World"	Bee Gees	
20 January	"World"	Bee Gees	
27 January	"World"	Bee Gees	
3 February	"Mien waar is mijn feestneus"	Toon Hermans	
10 February	"Mien waar is mijn feestneus"	Toon Hermans	
17 February	"Mien waar is mijn feestneus"	Toon Hermans	
24 February	"Mien waar is mijn feestneus"	Toon Hermans	
2 March	"Words"	Bee Gees	
9 March	"Words"	Bee Gees	
16 March	"Words"	Bee Gees	
23 March	"Kom uit de bedstee m'n liefste"	Egbert Douwe	
30 March	"Cinderella Rockefella"	Esther & Abi Ofarim	
6 April	"Cinderella Rockefella"	Esther & Abi Ofarim	
13 April	"Cinderella Rockefella"	Esther & Abi Ofarim	
20 April	"Cinderella Rockefella"	Esther & Abi Ofarim	
27 April	"Congratulations"	Cliff Richard	
4 May	"Congratulations"	Cliff Richard	
11 May	"Congratulations"	Cliff Richard	
18 May	"Congratulations"	Cliff Richard	
25 May	"Lazy Sunday"	Small Faces	
1 June	"Lazy Sunday"	Small Faces	
8 June	"Lazy Sunday"	Small Faces	
15 June	"Lazy Sunday"	Small Faces	
22 June	"Summertime Blues"	Blue Cheer	
29 June	"Ich bau' dir ein Schloß"	Heintje	
6 July	"Ich bau' dir ein Schloß"	Heintje	
13 July	"Ich bau' dir ein Schloß"	Heintje	
20 July	"Ich bau' dir ein Schloß"	Heintje	
27 July	"Ich bau' dir ein Schloß"	Heintje	
3 August	"Ich bau' dir ein Schloß"	Heintje	
10 August	"Ich bau' dir ein Schloß"	Heintje	
17 August	"Ich bau' dir ein Schloß"	Heintje	
24 August	"Ich bau' dir ein Schloß"	Heintje	
31 August	"Ich bau' dir ein Schloß"	Heintje	
7 September	"Dong Dong Diki Digi Dong"	The Golden Earrings	
14 September	"Hey Jude"	The Beatles	
21 September	"Hey Jude"	The Beatles	
28 September	"Hey Jude"	The Beatles	
5 October	"Hey Jude"	The Beatles	
12 October	"Hey Jude"	The Beatles	
19 October	"Hey Jude"	The Beatles	
26 October	"Hey Jude"	The Beatles	
2 November	"Heidschi bumbeidschi"	Heintje	
9 November	"Heidschi bumbeidschi"	Heintje	
16 November	"Heidschi bumbeidschi"	Heintje	
23 November	"Lea"	The Cats	
30 November	"Lea"	The Cats	
7 December	"Eloise"	Barry Ryan	
14 December	"Eloise"	Barry Ryan	
21 December	"Eloise"	Barry Ryan	
28 December	"Eloise"	Barry Ryan	

== See also ==
- 1968 in music
