= Dan Matovina =

American record producer (1957–2023)

- Born: October 10, 1957; Cleveland, Ohio, U.S.
- Died: June 2, 2023 (aged 65) Belmont, California U.S.
- Occupations: Record producer, recording engineer
- Years active: 1977–2023
- Website: www.badfingerlibrary.com www.facebook.com/BadfingerTheIveys/

Dan Matovina (October 10, 1957 – June 2, 2023) was an American record producer and recording engineer known for restoring tapes by Beatles protégés Badfinger and its precursor group, The Iveys, along with songwriting demos by Pete Ham and Tom Evans (musician). His 1997 biography of the band, Without You: The Tragic Story of Badfinger, was considered one of the top rock biographies upon its release.

== Biography ==
Matovina was born in Cleveland, Ohio. Beginning in the early 1980s, his production and studio work included artists such as Pete Ham, Badfinger, New Edition, The Monkees, Manhattan Transfer, Frankie Valli, The Beach Boys, The Pandoras, Dean Ford, The Babys, James Lee Stanley, Primetime, The Long Ryders, 5 Guns West, Radio Cammon, Easter, The Rats, Derrick Anderson, Blood on the Saddle and Jigsaw Seen. In addition to music, Dan worked on the lot of Metromedia where he became friends with LaWanda Page and Sherman Hemsley from The Jeffersons.

His production work included House of Freaks, Badfinger, Pete Ham, The Clints, Carman (singer) and On the Air (band). He worked for Bob Crewe (Frankie Valli and the Four Seasons) at his Los Angeles studio.

In the early 1990s, Matovina began his research for his biography of The Beatles protégés and Apple Records artists, Badfinger. Without You: The Tragic Story Of Badfinger (first published in 1997). A revised edition was made available in 2000 with a CD of rarities. In 2026, it is currently available on Kindle through Amazon.

In 2023, two years after the initial symptoms were originally ignored by his doctor, Matovina succumbed to a metastasized cancer. His final weeks were spent completing two projects for release and arranging song placements of Badfinger songs for The Holdovers and Mrs. Davis.

It was Matovina who negotiated the release of Ham and Evans' publishing rights from The Beatles' Apple Publishing, allowing a more aggressive promotion of the catalogue. Something that was considered a difficult task because of Apple's high prioritization of managing Beatles projects. Once accomplished, he compiled the song demo CD Badfinger: Perfection in cooperation with Bug Music. The disc is a remastering that surpassed the sonic quality of the reissues handled at the hands of EMI engineers.

Matovina had working relationships with the estate of Pete Ham, along with both Tom Evans and Mike Gibbins prior to their deaths, Ron Griffiths and others who worked with the band. During this time as the publishing agent for the Pete Ham Estate, he coordinated placements of Badfinger songs in commercials, on television, in movies and, most famously, the final scene of Felina, the series finale of Breaking Bad, (the Pete Ham-penned Baby Blue). Creator/producer Vince Gilligan had received a copy of the aforementioned Perfection CD. These placements and reissues generated considerable money for all of the individual popular lineup Badfinger members over the years after decades of minimal royalties. His restoration of pre-Badfinger recordings from The Iveys has also helped generate the first band-related income in decades for founding Badfinger member, bassist/vocalist, Ron Griffiths.

Matovina also coordinated with VH-1 an episode of Behind the Music featuring Badfinger. He also spearheaded a Blue Plaque issuance to commemorate Pete Ham and, diplomatically, his various bandmates.

== Discography ==
- New Edition (album) – New Edition MCA Records
- Dean Ford – This Scottish Heart – Shine On Records Album information link
- Prime Time – Flying High Total Experience Records
- The Girls Can't Help It – A Modern Girl Group Compilation Rhino Records 1984
- The Manhattan Transfer – Vocalese Atlantic Records
- Frankie Valli And The Four Seasons – Streetfighter (album) Curb Records
- Pandoras – Stop Pretending (album) Rhino Records
- The Pandoras – In And Out Of My Life (In A Day) (7" Single) Rhino Records
- The Monkees – Live 1967 (The Monkees album) Rhino Records
- House Of Freaks – Bottom Of The Ocean Rhino Records
- Blood On The Saddle – Fresh Blood SST Records
- Easter – Easter (band) Chameleon Records
- On The Air – On The Air Pulse Records
- House Of Freaks – Monkey On A Chain Gang Rhino Records
- Born With A Hole In My Pocket Various – All-Ears Review Volume 2 (CD, Comp, Sampler) ROM Records
- 5 Guns West – Bad Boys Rock N' Roll Wild West Records
- The Clints – No Place Like Home Skyclad Records
- Ringleader – If Licks Could Kill Statue Records
- The Jigsaw Seen – Shortcut Through Clown Alley Skyclad Records
- Badfinger – The Best Of Badfinger Volume II Rhino Records
- The Clints – Kimberly Drummond Greyslate
- Badfinger – Straight Up Apple Records
- Badfinger – BBC In Concert 1972-3 Strange Fruit
- Pete Ham – 7 Park Avenue Rykodisc
- Pete Ham – Golders Green Rykodisc
- Badfinger – The Very Best Of Badfinger
- Badfinger – Head First Artisan Recordings
- The Jigsaw Seen – My Name Is Tom Vibro-Phonic Recordings
- Pete Ham – Keyhole Street: Demos 1966–67 Without You Music
- Frankie Valli And The Four Seasons* – The Classic Albums Box Rhino Records Warner Music Group Germany
- The Jigsaw Seen – For The Discriminating Completist Burger Records
- The Iveys – Origins (The Iveys Anthology – Volume 1) RL Griffiths Presents
- Badfinger (2018 Reissue) – Badfinger Warner Bros. Records
- Badfinger – So Fine (The Warner Bros. Rarities) Warner Bros. Records Real Gone Music
- The Iveys – Badfinger Origins – The Iveys Anthology – Volume 2 – Live At Thingamajig Club – Reading U.K. - September 6, 1968, RL Griffiths Presents
- The Iveys – Golden Delicious Demos (1966–69) – The Iveys Anthology Vol 3 RL Griffiths Presents
- Pete Ham – Demos Variety Pack Without You Music
- Pete Ham – Gwent Gardens Y&T Music
- Tom Evans – I Am Myself (Demos: 1967–1970) Y&T Music
