= Screamin' Sirens =

American all-female band

- Origin: Los Angeles
- Genres: Alternative country, cowpunk, post-punk, new wave
- Years active: 1983–1987
- Labels: Enigma, Restless
- Past members: Pleasant Gehman; Boom Boom (Diane Laffoon); Shayn Taylor-Shubert; Rosie Flores; Laura Bandit

Screamin' Sirens was an American all-female band from Hollywood, California that recorded from 1983 to 1987. The band combined country music, punk rock, rockabilly and a dash of funk to create an eclectic wild party music. Screamin' Sirens predated what is usually referred to as alternative country, but influenced that subgenre's development.

== History ==
Formation

Screamin' Sirens were formed in Hollywood, California in around 1983. The band was formed by drummer/vocalist Boom Boom Laffoon and vocalist Pleasant Gehman, who recalled in a 1986 Flipside interview:

I just wanted to have a really wild all-girl band that was like a gang or something. And Boom Boom was the only drummer I could think of so even though we hated each other I wound up calling her anyway. We had all the same ideas about bands and life and drinking and everything.

Laffoon brought in, "the best girl guitarist and vocalist I ever met," Rosie Flores. Boom Boom and Rosie previously played together in Keith Joe Dick and the Goners (with cowboy punk legend Gary Dixon as lead guitarist/songwriter. After going through two bassists who quickly left, Rosie answered the band's ad in the Hollywood Times and tried out for the band in October 1980.XX .. Then the band added guitarist Rosie Flores, namesake of the band Rosie and the Screamers, with whom Laffoon was acquainted from her time with Keith Joe Dick and the Goners. The trio added bassist Laura Bandit, a veteran of the minor punk bands One Doesn't Swallow and Hard as Nails, Cheap as Dirt. A fifth member of the group, Marsky Reins, played fiddle in addition to guitar, helping the band to achieve a signature punked up country and western sound.

Sporting cowboy boots and western skirts, the band delivered a high energy live show. "A lot of people tell us we've got more balls than any girl band they've seen because we get real wild onstage," Pleasant Gehman noted. "We're not into wimpiness at all."

The band portrayed The She-Devils in Max Tash's film The Runnin' Kind, which took its name from a song written by sister and brother Diane Boom Boom Dixon and Gary Dixon (Fur Dixon's husband).

Lineup changes

The band had several lineup changes over the course of their existence, adding Miiko Watanabe on bass as well as former Pandoras drummer Casey Gomez.

Later bands

Original drummer and songwriter Diane 'Boom Boom' Dixon went on to play with the Baloney Heads and the Real Dixons in Austin, Texas. Pleasant Gehman became a writer and editor, professional dancer and a member of the Ringling Sisters. Rosie Flores went on to have a successful solo career in the alternative country and rockabilly scene. Genny Schorr, the original guitar player, was also in the original line-up of all girl band Backstage Pass and was involved in The Masque. She later owned Rock clothing store Strait Jacket with Elvis Costello's manager Jake Riviera. She was associated with bands such as The Bangles as Stylist. Miiko Watanabe went on to play with American Girls. Fur Dixon went on to play in The Cramps, The Dixons, Fur Dixon and Blow Up, Fur Dixon and Steve Werner, and a new band she formed in 2015, WTFUKUSHIMA!

== Personnel ==
- Diane ("Boom-Boom") Dixon: drums and vocals
- Pleasant Gehman: vocals
- Annette Zilinskas: bass and vocals
- Genny Schorr: guitar & vocals
- Fur Dixon: bass & vocals
- Shayn Taylor-Shubert: bass and vocals; switched to lead guitar before quitting
- Marsky Reins: fiddle, rhythm guitar, vocals
- Rosie Flores: lead guitar, vocals (replaced Shayn Taylor-Shubert)
- Miiko Watanabe: bass
- Laura Bandit: bass; later switched to rhythm guitar
- Casey Gomez: drums
- Kathryn Grimm: guitar
- Brie Howard: played live with the band after shooting the film "The Running Kind"

== Discography ==
Albums

- Fiesta! 1984, Enigma Records produced by Michael Reid, Greg Humphrey & Brian Ahern
- Voodoo 1987, Restless Records produced by Ethan James

Singles

- UK Import 45 "You're Good Girl's Gonna Go Bad" b/w "Runnin' Kind" 1984 Beach Culture Records
- Fiesta! 1984, Enigma Records produced by Michael Reid, Greg Humphrey & Brian Ahern

Compilations

- "Sound of Hollywood Women" 1983 Mystic Records track: "Ugly & Slouchy" (compilation)
- "Rodney on the ROQ" 1983 compilation track "Black And White Thunderbird", original song by the Delicates 1959.
- "Hell Comes To Your House" 1983 Enigma Records compilation tracks: "Your Good Girl's Gonna Go Bad", "Runnin' Kind"
- Enigma Variations - 1985 Enigma Records compilation, track: "Maniac"
- "Radio Tokyo Tapes" 1985 Compilation, Chameleon Records track "Little White Lies"
- "Skaterock" 1986 Thrasher records track: "Heartbreak Train
- "Reform School Girls (soundtrack) 1987 track: "Love Slave"

== See also ==
- List of all-female bands
