= It's About Time (The Pandoras album) =

Studio album by the Pandoras
- Released: 1984
- Recorded: Late 1983
- Studio: Silvery Moon, Los Angeles, California; Radio Tokyo, Los Angeles, California
- Genre: Garage punk
- Length: 32:08
- Label: Voxx
- Producer: Greg Shaw, Bill Inglot

It's About Time is the debut studio album by American garage punk band the Pandoras, released in 1984 by the Voxx record label.

== Reception ==
Professional ratings
Review scores
Source	Rating
AllMusic	4/5 stars
The Encyclopedia of Popular Music	3/5 stars
Martin C. Strong	6/10

In a retrospective review for the AllMusic website, critic Dean Carlson described the album as one that "shines in its muddily produced, tonally confident swagger" and "avoids the sputter of careerist garage rock for a spectacularly bleary haunted house feel." Carlson summed up by calling the album, "one of 1984's best garage-punk releases." Scott Schinder and Ira Robbins, writing for Trouser Press, called it, "as good a '60s punk record as any contemporary combo is likely to make".

== Track listing ==
All songs written by Paula Pierce unless otherwise noted.

Side one

1. "It's About Time"
2. "I Want Him"
3. "James"
4. "He's Not Far"
5. "Haunted Beach Party"
6. "The Hump" (Herb Gross)

Side two

1. "I Live My Life"
2. "Want Need Love"
3. "It Just Ain't True"
4. "High on a Cloud" (Mike Carrol)
5. "Cry on My Own"
6. "Going His Way"

== Personnel ==
- Paula Pierce – lead guitar, vocals, harmonica
- Bambi Conway – bass guitar, background vocals
- Gwynne (Kelly) Kahn – rhythm guitar, organ, background vocals
- Casey Gomez – drums
