= Enigma Variations (album) =

The Enigma Variations
- Album cover art by John Scarpati

Compilation album by Various Artists
- Released: 1985
- Genre: Punk
- Length: 90:33 (Original vinyl release); 68:46 (Original CD release); 50:40 (Greek vinyl release)
- Label: Enigma, Virgin
- Producer: Varies from track to track

The Enigma Variations is a compilation album of newer artists (in 1985) that were on Enigma Records or one of its subsidiaries. It was originally released as a double LP and cassette, but was then subsequently also released as a CD with a reduced number of tracks. The album was compiled by Steve Pross and William Hein. The Greek pressing of the album (on Virgin Records) was issued as a single LP.

A second compilation, The Enigma Variations 2, was released in 1987.

== Reception ==
- "Despite its lack of success with EMI, Enigma has continued to put out new records including the current two record set The Enigma Variations, the budget priced compilation which takes its name from a composition by Sir Edward Elgar offers 26 songs including several unreleased tracks by such stellar bands as Redd Kross, The Leaving Trains, Green on Red, The Untouchables, the Screamin' Sirens, The Effigies, T.S.O.L. and Cathedral of Tears. The label plans to follow up this release next month with a country compilation." (Patrick Goldstein, Los Angeles Times, 1985)
- "If this is not the best compilation album ever, it is only because volume two is just as good. This is alternative rock when it was really alternative. If any of these songs were sung by R.E.M., Nirvana, Pearl Jam or Coldplay, you would hear them every week on the radio, but now they are forgotten." (JT Fournier, epinions, 2006)

== Track listing ==
=== The Enigma Variations – Vinyl edition ===
Side One
No.	Title	Performer(s)	Length
1.	"Maniac"	Screamin' Sirens	2:38
2.	"Shadowdrive"	The Jet Black Berries	4:41
3.	"Flesh on the Wall"	Naked Prey	2:34
4.	"Oh Mother"	Tex & the Horseheads	2:55
5.	"Straight Ahead"	Greg Sage	4:10
6.	"Time Stands Still"	Chris D. / Divine Horsemen	4:08
7.	"A Blind Man's Penis"	John Trubee	1:41
Total length:			22:47

Side Two
No.	Title	Performer(s)	Length
8.	"No Easy Way Down"	Rain Parade	6:58
9.	"Disengaged from the World"	Plasticland	2:36
10.	"Worm Boy"	The Pandoras	2:10
11.	"Just for the Moment"	Get Smart!	2:20
12.	"Leaving Trains"	The Leaving Trains	2:38
13.	"Sixteen Ways"	Green on Red	2:33
14.	"24"	Game Theory	3:05
Total length:			22:20

Side Three
No.	Title	Performer(s)	Length
15.	"Insurance from God"	45 Grave	5:03
16.	"Blue Funk"	The Effigies	4:50
17.	"Juvenile Justice"	Kraut	1:54
18.	"Citadel"	Redd Kross	2:52
19.	"Flowers by the Door"	T.S.O.L.	3:32
20.	"True West"	Channel 3	2:59
Total length:			21:10

Side Four
No.	Title	Performer(s)	Length
21.	"A Situation Of"	Cathedral of Tears	3:25
22.	"The Yellow Boat"	Passionnel	3:41
23.	"Lebanon"	The Untouchables	3:42
24.	"Where Did We Go Wrong"	The Pool	3:46
25.	"Cow Punk"	Scott Goddard	4:51
26.	"Playback"	SSQ	4:51
Total length:			24:16 (90:33)

The Enigma Variations – CD edition
No.	Title	Performer(s)	Length
1.	"Shadowdrive"	The Jet Black Berries	4:41
2.	"Flesh on the Wall"	Naked Prey	2:34
3.	"Oh Mother"	Tex & the Horseheads	2:55
4.	"Straight Ahead"	Greg Sage	4:10
5.	"Time Stands Still"	Chris D. / Divine Horsemen	4:08
6.	"Sixteen Ways"	Green on Red	2:33
7.	"24"	Game Theory	3:05
8.	"No Easy Way Down"	Rain Parade	6:58
9.	"Disengaged from the World"	Plasticland	2:36
10.	"Worm Boy"	The Pandoras	2:10
11.	"Just for the Moment"	Get Smart!	2:20
12.	"Leaving Trains"	The Leaving Trains	2:38
13.	"Insurance from God"	45 Grave	5:03
14.	"Citadel"	Redd Kross	2:52
15.	"A Blind Man's Penis"	John Trubee	1:41
16.	"Maniac"	Screamin' Sirens	2:36
17.	"Flowers by the Door"	T.S.O.L.	3:32
18.	"The Yellow Boat"	Passionnel	3:41
19.	"Lebanon"	The Untouchables	3:42
20.	"Playback"	SSQ	4:51
Total length:			68:46

=== Greek Vinyl edition ===
Side One
No.	Title	Performer(s)	Length
1.	"No Easy Way Down"	Rain Parade	6:58
2.	"Sixteen Ways"	Green on Red	2:33
3.	"Maniac"	Stramin' Sirens	2:38
4.	"Time Stands Still"	Chris D. / Divine Horsemen	4:08
5.	"Leaving Trains"	The Leaving Trains	2:28
6.	"Flesh on the Wall"	Naked Prey	2:34
7.	"Straight Ahead"	Greg Sage	4:10
Total length:			25:29

Side Two
No.	Title	Performer(s)	Length
8.	"Shadowdrive"	The Jet Black Berries	4:41
9.	"Disengaged from the World"	Plasticland	2:36
10.	"Oh Mother"	Tex & the Horseheads	2:55
11.	"Insurance from God"	45 Grave	5:03
12.	"A Situation Of"	Cathedral of Tears	3:25
13.	"True West"	Channel 3	2:59
14.	"Flowers by the Door"	T.S.O.L.	3:32
Total length:			25:11 (50:40)
