= Stop Pretending (album) =

Studio album by the Pandoras
- Released: 1986
- Recorded: 1985
- Genre: Garage punk
- Length: 1:02:14
- Label: Rhino
- Producer: Bill Inglot

The Pandoras chronology
The Pandoras EP (1985)	Stop Pretending (1986)	Rock Hard EP (1988)

Stop Pretending is a studio album by the American garage punk band the Pandoras, released in 1986 by Rhino Records.

== Critical reception ==
Professional ratings
Review scores
Source	Rating
The Encyclopedia of Popular Music	3/5 stars
Houston Chronicle	3/5 stars
San Jose Mercury News	8/10
Martin C. Strong	6/10

Trouser Press wrote: "While maintaining the '60s fixation and playing up the brash-hussy stance, Stop Pretending features stronger playing and a harder-rocking edge (there's no reason why 'In and Out of My Life (In a Day)' shouldn't have been a hit), suggesting that the Pandoras aren't as hopelessly mired in historical fetishism as one might assume."

The Washington Post thought that "it's simply more interesting and even more modern when an all-female band adopts the aggressive punk stance and angry sound that was once the exclusive signature of male frustration and rebellion." The Los Angeles Times wrote that "[Paula] Pierce's vocals are uneven and the songs are more duplication than inspiration, but Stop Pretending effectively plays tough with stereotypes about '60s bands and girl bands, putting Pierce and her cohorts on top-which seems to be the position they prefer." The New York Times opined that "the musicianship is rough, and the album production ... suffers from its low budget like many independent label releases."

== Track listing ==
All songs written by Paula Pierce unless otherwise noted.

Side one

1. "In and Out of My Life (In a Day)"
2. "I Didn't Cry"
3. "Anyone but You"
4. "You're All Talk"
5. "That's Your Way Out"
6. "You Don't Satisfy"

Side two

1. "Let's Do Right"
2. "I'm Your Girl"
3. "That's the Way It's Going to Be"
4. "Stop Pretending"
5. "Ain't Got No Soul" (Gary Fausz, Jim Geyer)
6. "It Felt Alright"

2003 bonus tracks

1. "The Hump" (Herb Gross)
2. "I Want My Caveman"
3. "You Burn Me Up and Down" (Demo Version)
4. "Bad Seed" (Demo Version)
5. "She's Ugly" (Demo Version)
6. "Love Them, Leave Them" (Demo Version)
7. "Something I Can't Have" (Demo Version)
8. "You Don't Know" (Demo Version)
9. "Never Get Enough" (Demo Version)
10. "In and Out of My Life (In a Day)" (Demo Version)

== Personnel ==
- Lead vocals, guitar – Paula Pierce
- Bass, vocals – Kim Shattuck
- Keyboards, vocals – Melanie Vammen
- Drums, vocals – Karen Blankfeld
- Art direction – Don Brown
- Design – Grace Amemiya
- Engineer – Dan Matovina
- Lacquer Cut by KP
- Mixed by Bill & Dan
- Photography by Eric Stein
- Reissue liner notes by Paul Grant
- Producer – Bill Inglot
