= Blood on the Saddle (song) =

American cowboy song

"Blood on the Saddle" is an American cowboy song generally credited as having been written by Everett Cheetham. The song's title has also been identified as "Trail End" or "Blood".

The song describes a dead or permanently injured cowboy after a "bronco fell on him / And mashed in his head". Edith Fulton Fowke, writing in Folk Songs of Canada, commented, "Seldom have few words painted such a gory picture with so much relish." According to Tex Ritter, Cheetham had intended the song to be "a serious one about a genuinely tragic event", but found that when he sang it at dude ranches, the audiences laughed.

The song was performed by Ritter in the 1937 film Hittin' the Trail. When Ritter released the song on a single in 1950, Billboard magazine's review commented, "Gory Western opus is mugged effectively by the talented warbler." Tony Kraber also popularized the song.

The chorus of Tex Ritter's recording of "Blood on the Saddle" is used in the Country Bear Jamboree attraction at Tokyo Disneyland, and formerly at Disneyland in California. The same recording was used in the Country Bear Jamboree at Walt Disney World's Magic Kingdom in Florida until the attraction and its song list were revamped in 2024. In each attraction, the song has been presented by the Audio-Animatronics bear character Big Al.

== Authorship dispute ==
Some have attributed the song to Romaine Lowdermilk (1890–1970) instead of Cheetham. Shortly before Lowdermilk died, he wrote, "I sang Blood on the Saddle for the first time anywhere at Castle Hot Springs where Everett Cheetham was working and singing. Everett went to Hollywood and asked me to give him the song as he could get a part in some show or other (movie) and I gave it to him and he gave me a good one called Jose Cuervo's Daughter in exchange. ... In the picture he worked in they attributed the 'Blood' song to Cheetham which was all right with me, but the company copyrighted it, attributed it to Tex Ritter who still sings it after a fashion."

According to Fowke, the song's origin "has never been definitely settled. ... [I]t is not a modern song, for Dr. E. A. Corbett remembers a cowboy called Oklahoma Pete singing it on the Cochrane Ranch west of Calgary back in 1905."

When interviewed by Jerry Herndon of Murray State University in 1974, Cheetham said that he did write "Blood on the Saddle" in the 1920s and did not base it on any other song. He further stated that he sang it in the play Green Grow the Lilacs, in which he and Tex Ritter performed on Broadway in 1931.
