= James Intveld =

American singer-songwriter

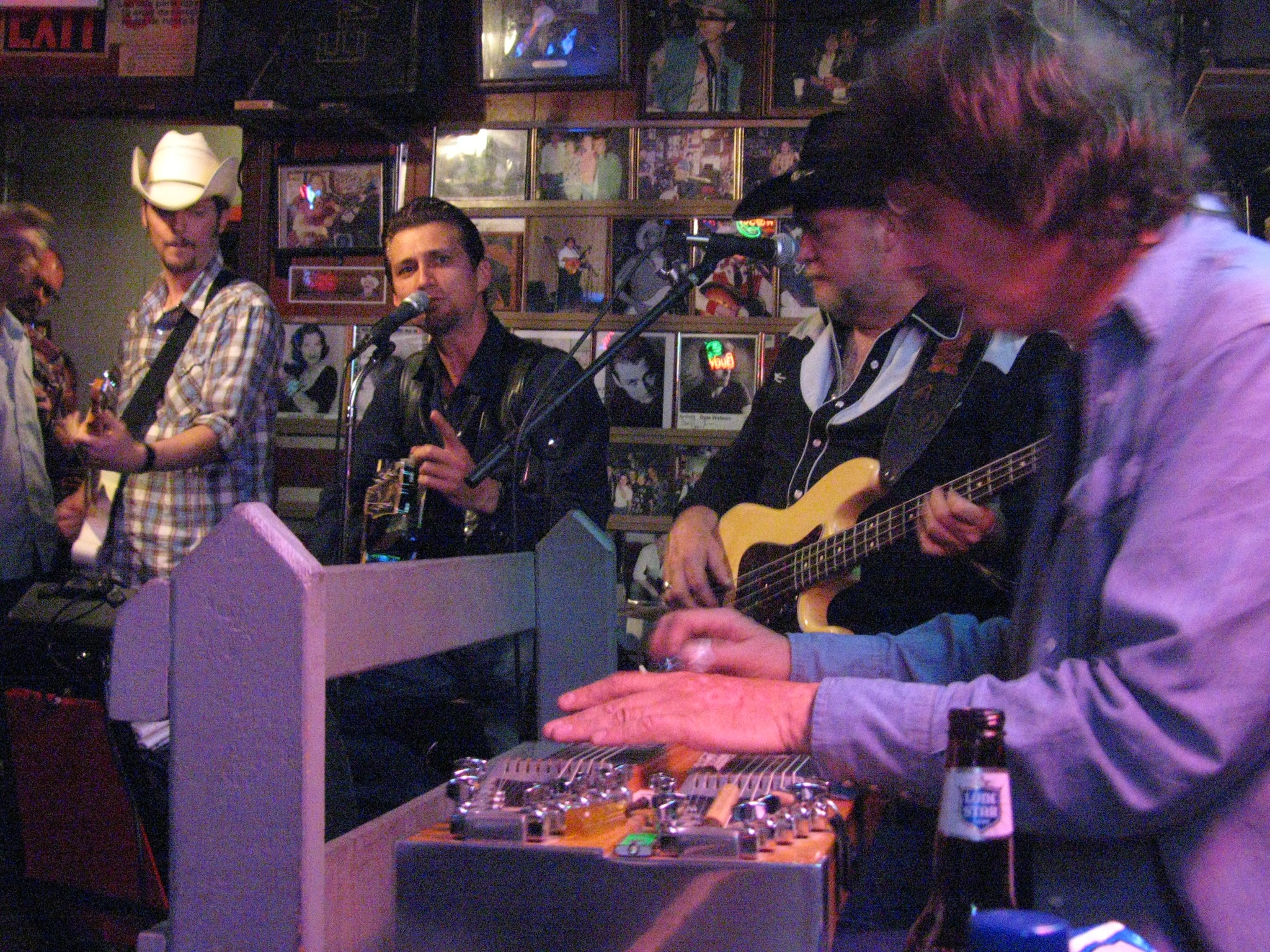

Background information
- Born: November 12, 1959 (age 66); Venlo, Netherlands
- Origin: Indo; Dutch; American
- Genres: Ameripolitan rockabilly rock 'n' roll country
- Occupations: musician singer songwriter performer actor film director
- Label: Molenaart
- Website: www.jamesintveld.com

James Intveld (born November 12, 1959) is an American rockabilly musician, singer, songwriter, performer, actor, and film director from Los Angeles, California, United States.

== Early career ==
Born in the Netherlands, Intveld's parents moved to California when he was one year old. James Intveld began entering talent contests as a country music-singing teenager at the Palomino Club located in North Hollywood, California.

Intveld originally played in The Rockin' Shadows with his brother Ricky Intveld. The group disbanded when Ricky and bassist Patrick Woodward were asked by Ricky Nelson to join his backing band, the Stone Canyon Band. Both Intveld's brother and Patrick Woodward were killed in the 1985 plane crash which also took Nelson's life.

The Rockin’ Shadows had recorded Intveld’s song "My Heart Is Achin' For You" for the 1983 compilation album (Art Fein Presents) The Best of L.A. Rockabilly.

As a songwriter, Intveld wrote "Crying Over You" recorded by Rosie Flores and released on her 1987 self-titled album. The aforementioned "My Heart Is Achin' For You" was covered by Sonny Burgess and Dave Alvin on Burgess’ 1992 comeback album, Tennessee Border.

Intveld played lead guitar for The Blasters from 1993 until leaving the band amicably in late 1995 to pursue his own projects, including acting and a solo album which would be released in 1995.

In 1995, Intveld released a solo album on Bear Family Records, Introducing James Intveld. Tracks included "Perfect World", "Blue Blue Day", "Cryin' Over You", "I'm To Blame", "Barely Hangin' On", "Samantha", "Your Lovin'", "You Say Goodnight, I'll Say Goodbye", "Kermit Vale", and "Wild Places".

In 2000, he released the album Somewhere Down The Road on Molenaart Records. Tracks included "Somewhere Down The Road", "Stringin' Me On", "All The Way From Memphis", "Love Calls", "One Sweet Letter", "Living Without You", "Stop The World", "Modern Don Juan", "What About You", "If I Should Lose You", "A Sinner’s Prayer", and "Remember Me". "Sinner’s Prayer" and "Remember Me" were included on the 2006 soundtrack for Choppertown: The Sinners, along with two other tracks that had not appeared on Intveld’s previous albums. A second volume of the Choppertown soundtrack, From the Vaults, included Intveld’s recording "Kermit Vale," which had appeared on his 1995 album.

He contributed lead vocals to a few records by blues guitarist Kid Ramos: "I Would Be A Sinner" on Ramos’ 1999 eponymous release, and "Love Don’t Love Nobody" on 2000’s West Coast House Party.

For the 2002 Johnny Cash tribute album Dressed in Black, Intveld contributed a cover of the classic "Folsom Prison Blues."

In 2008, he released Have Faith on the Molenaart label, with the tracks "Pretty World", "This Place Ain´t What It Used To Be", "Let´s Get Started", "Something You Can´t Buy", "A Woman´s Touch", "Have Faith", "Motel Time", "If Tears Could Talk", "Small Town Boy", and "Walk With Me".

The 2013 Carla Olson album Have Harmony, Will Travel featured Intveld's song "Stringin' Me On." He plays guitar on three tracks on the album and sings a duet on Buddy Holly's "Love's Made a Fool of You."

== Acting ==
Intveld was in the 1984 film Roadhouse 66, performing a song at the said roadhouse, acting alongside Willem Dafoe.

Intveld has appeared in a number of films, mostly in smaller, supporting roles such as co-starring with Billy Bob Thornton in Chrystal. Intveld lent his vocals to the titular character in John Waters' 1990 film Cry-Baby (with Cry-Baby being played onscreen by Johnny Depp), though left out of the main credits for this role, he is credited as the vocalist for all songs "performed" by the character. Intveld also appears in the George Strait music video, "The Seashores of Old Mexico". Intveld appeared in The Thing Called Love Movie as a backing singer to River Phoenix’s character.

In 2005, Intveld turned from acting to directing in the form of Miracle at Sage Creek, starring David Carradine. He had previously directed a music video for Dale Watson.

He appeared in the 2000 TV mini-series The Beach Boys: An American Family, portraying Hal Blaine.
