= Rosie Flores =

American singer-songwriter

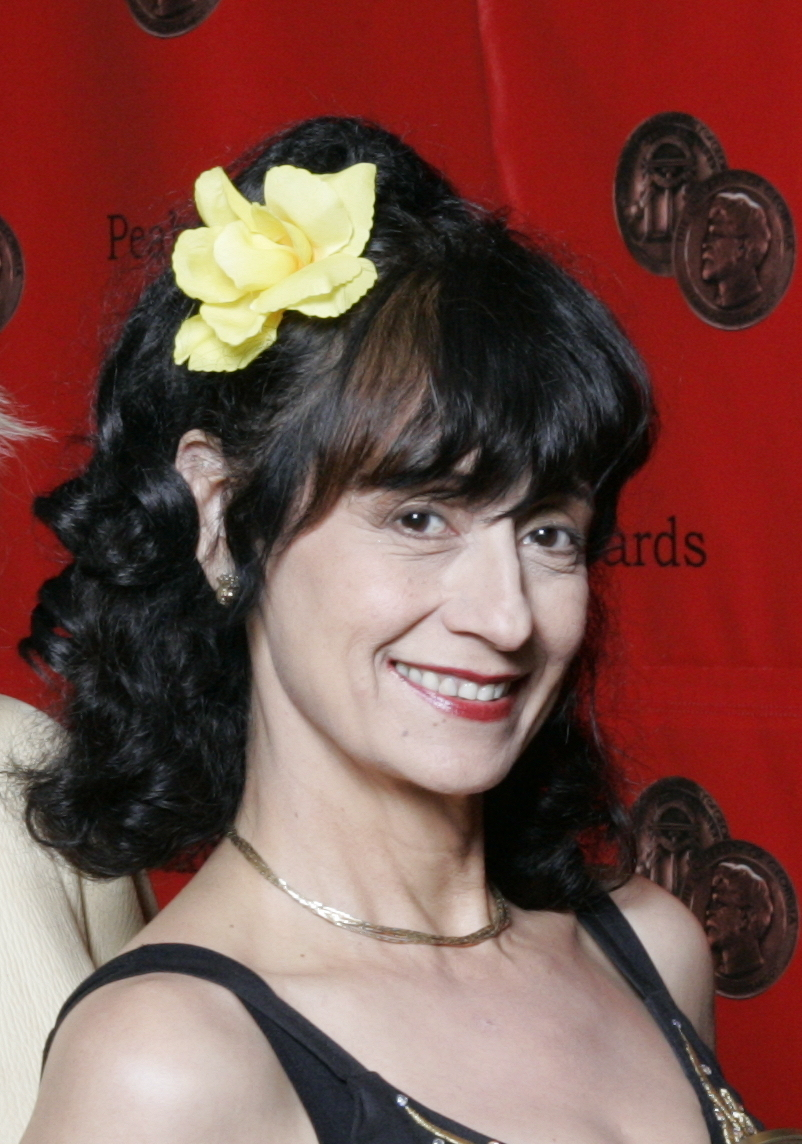
- Rosie Flores at the 67th Annual Peabody Awards in 2008

Background information
- Born: Rosalie Flores; September 10, 1950 (age 75)
- Origin: San Antonio, Texas, U.S.
- Genres: Rockabilly; country; alternative country; country rock; cowpunk; new wave
- Occupations: Singer; guitarist; songwriter
- Instruments: Vocals; guitar
- Years active: 1968–present
- Labels: Reprise; HighTone; Rounder; Watermelon; Eminent; Durango Rose; Emergent; Bloodshot Records
- Website: rosieflores.com

Rosie Flores (born Rosalie Flores; September 10, 1950) is an American rockabilly, blues and country musician who has been writing and performing since the 1970s. She currently resides in Austin, Texas, where August 31 was declared Rosie Flores Day by the Austin City Council in 2006.

== Biography ==
Rosie Flores was born in San Antonio, Texas, United States, where she lived until the age of twelve, when her family moved to San Diego. In interviews, Flores has recalled that growing up, she loved to watch musical television shows like The Dick Clark Show and Hit Parade. She began singing as a young child, picking up a guitar at age 6, and eventually learning how to play rhythm guitar from her older brother, Roger.

Flores formed her first band, Penelope's Children, while still in high school in California. In the 1970s, Flores played the San Diego nightclub circuit and was the namesake of the alt country/cowpunk band Rosie and the Screamers. By 21, she was in Los Angeles at her first recording session, though her first EP, Hit City L.A., wouldn't be released until 1982, possibly after leaving the Screamers.

In 1983, after the Screamers disbanded, she joined a cowpunk all-female band called Screamin' Sirens. The latter band produced a series of 7-inch singles and tracks for compilation albums before releasing an album in 1984, Fiesta, produced by Brian Ahern, Michael Reid and Greg Humphries.

Flores's debut album Rosie Flores came out on Warner Bros./Reprise in 1987. The single, "Crying Over You," put her on the Billboard chart for the first time. Since then, Flores has recorded 13 additional solo albums.

Flores has toured widely, appearing in the United States, Europe, Asia, Australia, and New Zealand. and also performing frequently in Austin, continuing into 2024. In 1995, she organized a tour with Wanda Jackson on a coast-to-coast North American tour, and she toured for eight months as a member of Asleep at the Wheel in 1997. She has also traveled with a concert tribute she created to honor Janis Martin, who she cites as a major influence early on in her career. She also performed the tribute concert's program at the Rock and Roll Hall of Fame and Museum, where, in 2012, she was also part of the Rock and Roll Hall of Fame's tribute to Chuck Berry. Her media appearances include Austin City Limits and Late Night with Conan O'Brien, and she had a cameo role in the 1993 film The Thing Called Love featuring River Phoenix and Sandra Bullock.

In addition to her work as a performer and songwriter, Flores has helped to revive the careers of female rockabilly musicians from previous generations and to create new interest in their music. Her album Rockabilly Filly, released on Hightone Records in 1995, included vocals from early rock and roll musicians Janis Martin and Wanda Jackson. In 2007, Flores brought Janis Martin to a recording studio in Blanco, Texas, to procuce with Bobby Trimble a record that would be both Martin's first solo album in thirty years as well as her last before her death of cancer. After the project was turned down by a number of record labels, Flores raised more than $16,000 on Kickstarter to release the album, which was titled Janis Martin: The Blanco Sessions. Flores is credited as a producer.

Flores's current (as of 2013–2018) guitar of choice is her James Trussart SteelTopCaster. She uses Fender amplifiers, and has also played Fender Telecasters, Gretsch electrics, Gibson Les Pauls, and various acoustic guitars.

In 2019, Flores released her album, Simple Case of the Blues in the UK.

== Musical style ==
According to AllMusic, Flores's "talent for alternative country and rockabilly made her a favorite with both audiences and critics." Nashville Scene defined Flores as a "New Wave country-rocker". San Diego Tribune described Flores as a "dynamo of rockabilly and cow-punk" who is "equally gifted as a singer, songwriter, guitarist and band leader [and] shines whether performing country, rock, swing or any of the other earthy American styles she has made her own."

== Personal life ==
Flores has revealed that, under pressure from her manager, she had an abortion in 1986, shortly after signing with Warner Bros. She later regretted the decision. She has never been married, and has said that her lifestyle, which involves frequent touring, makes it difficult to maintain long-term relationships.

== Awards and nominations ==
Year	Association	Category	Nominated work	Result
1986	Academy of Country Music	Top New Female Vocalist	Herself	Nominated
2007	Peabody Awards	N/A	Whole Lotta Shakin'	Won
2014	Ameripolitan Music Awards	Honky Tonk Female	Herself	Won
2014	Ameripolitan Music Awards	Rockabilly Female	Herself	Won
2024	National Endowment for the Arts	National Heritage Fellow	Lifetime career	Won
