= List of Pimp My Ride episodes =

The following is an episode list of the television show Pimp My Ride.

== U.S. version ==
=== Season 1 (2004) ===
Episode Number	Model	Modifications
1	Wyatt's Daihatsu Hi-Jet (1988)	US$20,000 of goods put into the Hi-Jet, painted in "Hi-Jet" blue with silver and gray flames. The "micro-van" was done with a Jet theme, including authentic airliner "fasten your seatbelt" plaques and a large rear spoiler. The rear of the van included a wrap-around couch, wall mounted 15-inch TV and tiny fridge. Wyatt (trying to start a band) was given a preamp and guitar to be able to play music through the stereo system, and a mini camera was installed in the grill and displayed on the internal monitors.
2	Nile's Cadillac Sedan DeVille (1978)	Painted in candy pink pearl and fitted with 20-inch wheels, the car had a see-through DVD changer in the dash and a plexiglass-encapsulated "river" (playing off the River Nile; after the owner's name). When the trunk opened, a shoe rack full of new shoes automatically extended, replacing the pile of old shoes that the owner had stashed in her trunk.
3	Oldsmobile Cutlass Supreme (1986)	The floor of the trunk was made to resemble the hardwood floor of a professional basketball court. WCC painted the car with a custom bright green in the front that faded into a dark green from the midpoint towards the rear of the car.
4	Honda Civic (1992)	The owner drove the car only on weekends and kept it on cinder-blocks to prevent theft. Three days after this episode aired, the owner's grandmother died of gastric cancer.
5	Mitsubishi Mirage (1990)	Painted blue that matched the neon they put on the bottom. WCC put a 10-inch monitor inside the car. WCC also installed a small aquarium in between the rear seats. The original 13-inch wheels were replaced with 18-inch wheels. Xzibit planned to replace the car with a Hummer H3. But it didn't happen.
6	Ford Mustang (1967)	The front seats were made to recline all the way flat so that the custom LCD monitor in the headliner could be easily viewed. The car was originally fitted with special exhaust pipes that shot out flames when the engine was started. However, due to concerns of the WCC owner Ryan that such devices could be illegal, they were quickly removed.
7	Ford Ranger (1985)	The Ranger was given a pearl orange paint job and lowered 3 inches. Under the truck bed cover was a ping-pong table, which slid out to reveal a couch and a TV with a GameCube.
8	Pontiac Trans Am (1981)	When the Trans Am was being pimped, some of the WCC crew made references to Smokey and the Bandit. This pimped-out vehicle had a coffee maker installed in a center console and a chandelier in place of the dome light. The car has a huge bird decal installed on the new Trans Am's hood. However, due to the oversized design, a smaller one replaced it.
9	Chevrolet LUV Truck (1974)	Since the owner liked to go camping, a Tonneau cover was placed over the rear box and was made to lift up vertically. Once opened, the tonneau became a camping tent.
10	Ford Mustang Convertible (1989)	During the episode, Xzibit made several references to Vanilla Ice because the car featured had an extreme resemblance to the car used by Vanilla Ice in his music video for Ice Ice Baby.
11	Nissan Maxima Station Wagon (1984)	The Nissan was referred to as the "identity crisis" because of the Datsun and Nissan badges. The Wagon was turned into a mobile DJ booth by WCC.
12	Volkswagen Baja Bug (1960)	
13	Honda CRX (1987)	This was the first car to visually get a brand-new engine, as the old engine died before Xzibit could pull it into the shop.
14	Toyota Land Cruiser (1972)	A pick-ax with a padlock came with the Land Cruiser.
15	Ford Escort (1989)	This was two halves of two Ford Escorts welded and "gummed" together; therefore the car was considered too dangerous for him to continue to own. To replace this car, WCC and Xzibit procured a 2004 Scion xB and "pimped" that instead.

=== Season 2 (2004) ===
Episode Number	Model	Modifications
1	Cadillac Eldorado (1984)	The rims put on it were 24 carat gold plated 18-inch Daytons, and were worth more than the car originally. Also a two tone air horn was placed.
2	Ford Escort (1991)	Turned into a replica of a BMW M3.
3	Volkswagen Bus (1958)	An automated surf rack was installed on the roof. A 40-inch TV was installed in the back, making it the largest television WCC has ever put in a car. A fold-out school bus style stop sign that read "CHILL" was put on the side.
4	Chevrolet Suburban (1985)	WCC installed a working sink in the back along with a "mirror" since Alice wanted to be a make-up artist.
5	Chevrolet S-10 Blazer (1987)	Fitted with a fireplace in the back and flames on the side.
6	Acura Legend (1988)	Trunk in bowling ball polisher
7	Nissan 240SX (1989)	Produced as a replica tie-in with the video game Need for Speed: Underground 2, because the owner was a fan of the video game series. Of note is that the 240SX featured in the game was a hatchback, while the pimped car was a coupe.
8	West's Ford Fairlane (1963)	The 19-year-old owner was hoping to become a mechanic, so WCC and Xzibit decided to let him restore his car himself and procured a 2005 Toyota 4Runner to "pimp". This is the only time that the car intended to be pimped was returned to the person without being worked on, and the only time in the show's three replacement vehicles (to date) that the person got back the old car and received a new pimped vehicle.

=== Season 3 (2005) ===
1. Nate's Ford Econoline (1985)
  - Formerly a Municipal Van, turned into a limousine for the band that the owner played for. The hot tub in the rear added so much weight when filled with water that an air suspension system was installed on the rear axle to support it.
  - This pimped vehicle is seen on the intro episode of "Where are they now?".
2. Sara's Chevrolet S-10 (1988)
  - An 8 Ball Pool table was mounted on the back of the truck, a limousine divider was installed on the back window to make the pool table playable in all angles.
  - The exterior was painted black metallic with air brushed graphics on the sides and hood.
  - Features a fog machine under the hood.
3. Brooke's Chevrolet Cavalier Convertible (1991)
  - A digital projector was mounted on the trunk lid that could pivot so that the projector faced forward and could turn any wall into a drive-in movie theater. A popcorn maker was also installed in the center console and individual DVD players were also stuffed into the headrests so the rear passengers could each watch their own movie.
4. Tom's Chevrolet Caprice (1996)
  - This was a former Police car.
  - Since Tom is a skateboarder, WCC equips the Caprice with grind rail from the rear bumper, with Impala-like body kits, custom gold paint, and super hi-beam lights inside the trunk.
  - The car has been equipped with police lights via microphone. Tom also received a WCC skateboard.
5. JT's Honda Civic (1988)
6. Jekara's Chevrolet Bel Air (1955)
  - Paint, white and pink with old school pinstripes
  - 20" symbolic rims with big tires.
  - 27" monitors that pop out of the seats
  - Motorized closet in the trunk
7. Vivian's Toyota Wonderwagon LE (1986)
  - Was given a dog grooming area in the trunk, and a recreated 1980s-style arcade table-top game in the passenger cab area.
8. Eric's Mitsubishi Eclipse (1998)
  - To reflect his job as a baggage handler at the airport, the hatch area had three belts that simulated a baggage claim area. On each belt, was a Sony PSP.
  - Given a "half-half" paint job, where one side was one color scheme, while the other side was another color scheme.

=== Season 4 (2005) ===
1. Jessica's AMC Pacer (1976)
  - The owner of the vehicle was studying to become a nutritionist. The car was fitted with a huge cloth sunroof, a rear wing with a solar panel to power the electronics, and a juicer in the trunk. The entire interior of the car was retrofitted with yellow shag carpeting; when he saw it Xzibit promptly joked, "Who killed Big Bird?"
  - This car was infested with rat droppings; indeed, the mechanics found a live rat inside the car. Consequentially, Xzibit's gift to the car's owner was a cat, which Jessica named "Pacer".
  - At the end it says; "no rats were harmed in the pimpin' of this ride"
2. Josh's Toyota Corolla (2003)
  - The car had suffered a lot of superficial body damage before it was "pimped". The reverse gear was also broken, which WCC had repaired. Intriguing features of this car included four liquid crystal displays mounted in the left and right of both front and rear bumpers.
  - Since being pimped, Josh wrecked the car, as he brought it to the "Where are They Now?" episode sans hood. Xzibit mockingly told Josh that they do not do Re-Pimps. Xzibit also revealed that, 15 minutes after giving Josh his rental car—MTV gives rental cars to the owners whose cars are being pimped—he also wrecked his rental car (a Chevrolet Malibu).
3. Heather's Chevrolet C10 (1986)
  - This truck was "pimped" so that the entire truck bed could come out at an angle. Also, the driver's seat included a special raise and lower feature, as Heather (a very short female) had difficulty seeing out the back.
  - The truck had its brakes nearly completely gone (which emits a very loud screeching sound); the show featured the truck hitting an egg (before the brakes were fixed), then rerunning the same stunt with fixed brakes, where the egg was not hit.
  - The truck also had, for proper weight, cow manure, and hoes (Xzibit frequently told the audience during this episode that the "hoes" were of the gardening kind, not the other kind) in the truck bed before being "pimped".
  - The electronics in the back of her truck cost more than US$30,000.
4. Tin's Dodge Caravan (1988)
  - Since the owner was a full-time student who often slept in his car, the van was installed with a custom fully reclining Maybach-style seat positioned between two waterfalls. It also included a 17-inch LCD flip monitor and a built-in DVD player. Also included was a built-in badminton net with a shuttlecock launcher. In addition, Tin was given a laptop with wireless internet, a wireless keyboard and a USB compatible microscope.
5. Alex's Chevrolet Chevelle Convertible (1968)
  - An all-new small-block Chevy V8 engine was installed in the car in order to live up to its reputation as a muscle car. Also, since the driver practiced magic, it also had its sound system concealed, only to be revealed by a secret incantation.
  - A musical horn
  - Alex revealed on the "Where are They Now?" episode that he wrecked the car the first day he got it back.
6. Rashae's Ford Taurus (1989)
  - This car was fitted with memory foam seats for the comfort of the driver, and since the owner had aspirations to be a Hollywood stuntwoman, the trunk was fitted with a professional stunt cushion.
  - The Taurus's front door hinges were altered to swing upward, Lamborghini-style, and the rear doors opened horizontally without hinges.
7. Jake's Buick Century (1986)
  - The WCC crew removed the backseats and replaced it with the MTX Audio JackHammer, a 22-inch subwoofer weighing 369 pounds. A decibel meter was installed in the dash to alert Jake to keep it down. Uniquely, due to wanting a retro 1950s nature for the car, this would perhaps be the only car in Pimp My Ride's history to have flat black paint, and alloys replaced with regular steel wheels, whitewalls, and hubcaps.
  - The car was once Jake's grandmother's, whom was a chain smoker. So many cigarette butts were found in the car, Xzibit quipped, "Grandma's lungs must be as black as I am."
  - During the filming of this episode, Big Dane told Jake to "Be more excited, or I will stomp you."
8. Cristi's Chevrolet Panel Truck (1957)
  - The owner was of Italian descent. The WCC crew installed a copy of Michelangelo's famous mural painting The Creation of Adam on the ceiling of the truck.
  - Prior to "pimping", the van had a large bullet hole through the passenger's side windshield.

=== Season 5 (2006) ===
1. Calvin's Chevrolet Malibu (1977)
  - Having stated that Calvin had seen a UFO (known as the Flying Saucer) after living in the desert, his car was painted silver with green glow-in-the-dark crop circles and featured doors that opened automatically via a remote control.
2. Erin's Volkswagen Thing (1973)
  - The Thing (known as the VW 181 in other markets) was equipped with a faux alligator and snakeskin interior.
  - The car was equipped with a custom terrarium.
  - The GAS crew equipped it with a 200-horsepower turbo engine.
3. Monique's Mitsubishi Galant (1994)
  - The Galant was painted sky blue with a white sun on the hood and doors. The GAS crew swapped the rear seat for a chaise longue, featuring 6 LCD monitors and a laptop that could be pulled out.
  - One of the more notable features was a scrolling LED marquee installed on which Monique could display her spoken word poetry.
4. Dante's Ford Econoline Ice Cream Truck (1976)
  - This was the first actual business vehicle to be pimped, which means Donte could receive a tax deduction if he gets taxed for everything put into it.
  - The truck was painted sapphire blue with icicles on the side. Ice cream-related features included a touch screen order system, a robotic arm which can dispense the ice cream to the customer at a kid level, and a full stock of ice cream.
  - He still sells ice cream in the north side of Long Beach, California.
  - The GAS crew found a family of eight mice in this van when stripping it.
    - According to Mad Mike, the van was discreetly replaced for this reason.
5. Jason's Toyota T100 (1994)
  - Having been completely stripped of all parts and stolen, only the actual frame and cabin remained (he still can drive it because California state law says that in order to drive a car, it must have working headlights, which it has). After putting new parts on the car (the only time in the series things were put on the car instead of taking them off before pimping), the car was painted in a camouflage style purple, white, grey, and black, nicknamed "glamoflage" (sticking out instead of blending in as camouflage does). The seats had a layer of kevlar added. Other than a complete "pimping" of his car, Jason also received a Yamaha Raptor 350 All Terrain Vehicle that was also pimped. The GAS crew put two LCD monitors and a DVD player on the ATV.
6. Joe's Cadillac Sedan DeVille Limousine (1988)
  - Xzibit was stopped by a LASD policeman while driving the car to the GAS garage.
  - Having replaced the divider with a 50-inch plasma monitor, a TubeRunners custom Pneumatic Tube system was installed so the passengers could communicate with the driver.
  - A rumble seat was installed in the trunk, with a 27-inch LCD TV that flipped up from the roof. Joe was warned not to drive the limo with anyone sitting back there.
7. Shawna's Toyota Celica (1990)
  - Given mods like Lambo-style scissor doors, bodykit, outrageous paint scheme, and other related modifications.
  - Installed in the trunk was an Apple PowerBook laptop with 2 terabytes of hard drive space, via external hard drives. It could also be controlled with a 7-inch touch screen in the front.
  - In the console, GAS gave Shawna an iPod Nano and a Palm Treo cell phone, which Shawna did not know how to use, as she had never owned a computer or a cell phone.
8. Tad's Land Rover Range Rover (1989)
  - Xzibit finds the graphics on the SUV and he does not know what kind of graphics these are.
  - The Range Rover was given an orange paint job with a white stripe. In the rear a water bed and water machine were installed. On the roof GAS installed a satellite dish which could connect to the internet from anywhere in the world.
  - This pimped vehicle is seen on the intro episode of "Where are they now?".
9. Gerald's Chevrolet Monte Carlo (1978)
  - Gerald's Monte Carlo was given the Southern "Box" treatment. It was painted black with leopard flames on the front.
  - The car was given 24-inch spinners, which raised it by 8 inches. This is a GAS record for the largest rims installed on a car.
10. Ellyn's Ford Contour (1996)
  - Xzibit finds a car marked with claws that Ellyn explains was attacked by a bear while she and her friends were camping.
  - The GAS crew equips her car with green and orange tear graphics and the muffler-like salmon cannon in order to prevent a bear from attacking her car again.
11. John's Mercury Cougar (1968)
  - Xzibit found one spinner on the car's tires
  - The car was painted black base with canary yellow racing stripes. GAS also installed a 450 hp Roush racing motor. Special feature was the 32-foot inflatable projector screen
12. Xilomen's Ford Probe (1995)
  - Car's Aztec-style paint scheme by street artist Man One; interior seats done up with Aztec pyramid designs; trunk made to hold art supplies for Xilomen's art classes; car can "paint" via paint guns in each tire's wheel well.
13. Tyler's Chevrolet El Camino (1965)
  - A football fan's El Camino becomes the ultimate tailgating machine. Metallic purple paint job with yellow flames. New 350 cubic-inch, 350 hp engine with bird catcher blowers. Satellite TV with five plasma monitors, 5000 Watt audio amplifier, and PlayStation 2. Also includes a propane grill and Wunder Bar condiment dispenser.
  - In addition, Tyler received tickets to the 2006 Oakland Raiders season opener, as well as a Randy Moss NFL jersey.
  - Tyler's grandfather had won this car playing poker and had given it to him.
14. Lawanna's Volkswagen Bug (1968)
  - Car's body parts placed with the Porsche and Ferrari body kits by the GAS crew.
  - The car's theme was "Hair Force One". This is due to the fact that Lawanna was a hair stylist who was about to enter the Air Force. In the trunk in the car's front was installed a sink with shampoo and conditioner dispensers, as well as waterproof speakers and an iPod nano. Inside the car was a high-power hair dryer which got air via a scoop on the car's roof.
  - The cockpit featured airplane-style gauges and a flight navigation system. Xzibit also gave her a plane toy that includes flight lessons in order to fly a real plane.
15. Josh's Chevrolet K5 Blazer (1987)
  - The snowboarder's ride was given an RC car-style paint job, 6 subwoofers in the trunk, and a 60-inch flip-up LCD monitor in the rear.
  - Presumably inspired by Mad Magazine's Pimp My Ride parody, the truck received diamond-plate mud flaps with 7-inch monitors installed in them.
  - Josh also received a new Burton snowboard with a 7-inch monitor built-in.
16. Mary's Nissan Pulsar (1988) (replaced with a new Ford Mustang GT (2006)
  - Due to the high temperatures the engine was giving off to the cockpit, Xzibit replaced the Pulsar with a brand-new Ford Mustang GT to be pimped.
  - This is only the third time in the series history, and the first time using GAS as the customizer, that the vehicle was replaced rather than pimped.
  - The new Mustang GT was painted bright green with chrome on the front end. The interior featured seventeen monitors between the pillars, sun visors, dashboard, and head rests. In the trunk were three additional monitors, including a 20-inch monitor that could pop out, tilt, and spin around. This is a Pimp My Ride record for most monitors installed (twenty total).

=== Season 6 (2007) ===
1. "Where are They Now?" Episode
  - Xzibit revisited the pimped cars of "Big" Ron (Cadillac El Dorado), Donte (Ford Econoline Ice Cream Truck), Josh (Toyota Corolla), Nile (Cadillac DeVille), Ryan (VW Bus), Christine (Honda Civic), and Alex (Chevrolet Chevelle).
  - Two of the cars have since been wrecked: Josh's Corolla (he also totaled the rental car they gave him) and Alex's Chevelle (which was totaled the first day he got it).
  - Two of the rides were seen in the intro part of this episode are: Tad's Range Rover and Nate's Econoline.
2. Tenita's Ford Thunderbird (1965)
  - Equipped with a new Ford Racing Engine, Kumho racing tires that makes pink smoke if the driver does a burnout, windows that roll up by snapping, and a trunk that takes pictures when the trunk lid is opened.
3. Mike's Grumman Kurbmaster Wonder Bread Truck (1978)
  - Mike had bought the van from the Wonder Bread company for US$300 when they retired it from their fleet.
  - Mike had done a pimping job on his own car. The back of his car contained a chandelier, a couch, a surfboard, a TV, and a Super NES; making it the first car on the show that had a video game system in the car before it was pimped.
  - Mad Mike hooked up two MTX Audio JackHammers into the car.
  - Xzibit said the Super NES was what he thought was the first Nintendo, it was actually the second.
4. Kristoffer's Chevrolet Impala SS (1965)
  - This show featured California Governor Arnold Schwarzenegger.
  - It was equipped with GM's 6.6 liter Duramax turbodiesel, mated with an Allison Transmission, and intended to run on biodiesel. Kristoffer also received a 1-year supply of fuel from James Jones of Hastings Nebraska.
  - The show was working in correlation with MTV's Break the Addiction campaign.
  - The GAS crew also equipped the car with hemp covered seats, which prompted Schwarzenegger to remind the crew that hemp was illegal in California.
5. Spechelle's Mercedes-Benz 300SD (1981)
  - GAS paints the car pink with a reddish-pink symbol on the front, they took the Mercedes symbol off and made a big "S" made out of diamonds (actually rhinestones). Monitors were put in all of the head rests (Facing forward for some strange reason, making it so people in the front seats would have to turn their head around to watch them). Also, it included fake beaver skin seats. At the end they gave her custom-made pink roller skates.
  - GAS crew equips with a special "crunk trunk", which opens and closes repeatedly. However, this show features GAS crew Jason, placing his arm on an open trunk. Mad Mike then tests it out, and Jason's arm becomes "amputated". Jason says that it's "only a flesh wound". The blood nearly stained the car. (intended to be a spoof of the Black Knight scene from Monty Python and the Holy Grail.)
  - After the placing of the beaver fur on the seats it says "no rabbits were harmed or pimped during the making of this episode"
  - The forward-facing headrest monitors were dubbed "Extreme Hatervision" by Mad Mike and Xzibit.
6. Robert's Chevrolet Van (1984)
  - Robert's grandparents won this van back in 1984 in Las Vegas. It was already pimped out with graphics of Las Vegas resorts from the time. (Robert asked MTV to "repimp" his ride.)
  - The GAS crew equips with a slot machine in order to open the sliding door, the owner must get a jackpot. A craps table floor and a keyboard piano with a roulette table built inside of a baby grand piano replica were installed as well.
  - Wayne Newton was also featured in this episode.
7. Laila's Plymouth Grand Voyager Expresso (1998)
  - The van was equipped with a special "Vroom Box" which enabled the van to sound like other different types of "Supercars" including a Ford GT and an Aston-Martin Vanquish. Due to safety reasons, this feature was removed from the van when it was given back to the owner.
  - After exchanging hands multiple times, The van was purchased by automotive YouTuber Freddy "Tavarish" Hernandez for $850 in late 2019, in poor condition, and it was restored back to its original condition when it was featured on the show. It was later found that a 1999 Grand Voyager (originally thought to have been a Dodge Grand Caravan) had replaced the original 1998 model, which was in very poor condition when it was evaluated by the GAS crew; something that wasn't fully disclosed in the episode. When the van was fully restored, Tavarish gave the van to fellow YouTuber Tyler Hoover of Hoovie's Garage as a "surprise" Christmas present. In January 2020, the van was loaned to the Midwest Dream Car Collection in Manhattan, Kansas for exhibition. It was reclaimed by Hoover in February 2021 following the lapsing of the one-year loan period. The van was bought back by Hernandez in 2022 who loaned it to Petersen Automotive Museum.
8. Seth's Nissan Maxima (1989)
  - Because of his love of both Transformers and all kinds of candy, his car's pimping includes a "Transforming" back seat that slides open to reveal the sound system and monitors, and a cotton candy machine in the trunk.
9. Jonathan's Honda CRX (1991)
  - In honor of Jonathan's love of comic books (and the Fantastic Four in particular) and surfing, the car was painted with "Silver Surfer" chrome, and the interior done up with Fantastic Four accents, including a comic keeper replacing the glove box (loaded with a copy of Fantastic Four #48—the issue in which the Silver Surfer premiered—valued at US$4000) and a rear A/V/Xbox setup inspired by The Thing. He was also presented with a custom "Silver Surfer" surfboard. (They actually gave him a copy of Fantastic Four #50, you can tell by simply watching the episode and looking at the cover of the comic, #50 is not the first appearance of Silver Surfer and that comic is not likely to be worth $4,000 due to condition and lack of grading).
  - Due to being unavailable to film this episode, Xzibit's hosting duties were filled in by rapper Chamillionaire, who—according to the episode—used to drive a CRX as his work vehicle, transporting urine samples from doctors' offices to the testing facility. He managed to pay homage to his biggest hit, "Ridin'" and the "Weird Al" Yankovic parody of it, "White & Nerdy":
    Chamillionaire: (to Jonathan) "So you really are ridin' dirty". Jonathan: "Yeah, I'm...or white and nerdy." (Chamillionaire laughs hysterically.)
10. Vanessa's Ford Festiva L (1991)
  - Nicknamed "Zippy" by the owner
  - Vanessa's car has a nitrous tank installed.
  - The car is put on a body kit from Festiva Motorsports
  - This episode began a 10-episode marathon that was originally intended to be a 'sneak peek' at the new season. However, a 7th season was never produced.
11. David's Ford Econoline (1972)
  - Since he was running a family dog grooming business, the back of his van got the ultimate grooming station with a new bathtub and a drying cage with a 32-inch monitor so the dogs can watch TV while they get dried off.
  - They also hooked him up with a slide-out 42-inch monitor, a black and blue paint job with cage graphics because he wanted to become a cage fighter.
  - GAS also gave him a hot dog maker in his dash when he gets hungry.
12. Will's Jeep Grand Wagoneer (1987)
  - As he was a handyman, the car included such storage devices as a rotating turntable in the back and slots inside the window to hold all his tools.
13. Esmerelda's Pontiac Sunbird (1991)
  - Esmerelda really likes the beach, so she had a Hawaiian Tiki god painted on the hood, and tiki gods stitched into the leather seats.
  - In the trunk, a snow cone maker was installed, along with 2x150w Genesis waterproof subwoofers.
  - GAS installed a mood control gadget: angry (smoke), sad (light washers), flirty (wolf whistle), happy (flashing internal lights), and a rollerbar with high powered binoculars mounted on it.
  - Wheels and tires: 18 Tezzen Sonic alloys, Pirelli P-Zero tires.
14. Justin's Toyota RAV4 (1997)
  - Nearly five years after the show's conclusion, the RAV4 was engulfed in flames in 2011, citing faulty wiring that destroyed the car altogether. The footage of the burning car can be found on YouTube.
15. Terese's Ford LTD Crown Victoria Station Wagon (1984)
  - Makes several references to the "Family Truckster" from National Lampoon's Vacation.
  - GAS turns the car into a look-alike ambulance.
16. Amber's Chevy Cavalier (2002)
  - Candy root beer.
17. Louis' Subaru Impreza (1996)
  - Louis likes paint balling with his friends, so he gets a secret compartment in the trunk with a set of paint balling gear.
  - Since the car was in fact a Subaru GAS decided to give it a Rally replica makeover with vinyls and race stickers.
18. Andrew's Cadillac Fleetwood Hearse (1970)
  - This hearse was painted deep purple with custom airbrushed skulls in the front half. A coffin equipped with a grill slides automatically out the back for on the go cooking.
  - This was the final episode before the series' conclusion.

== Pimp My Ride Baltic ==
=== Season 1 (2008) ===
1. (Lithuania) Paulius Nissan Bluebird
2. (Latvia) Kaspars Honda Civic (1994)
3. (Estonia) Kadri's Fiat Panda (1985)

== Pimp My Ride International ==
=== Season 1 (2006) ===
1. (Poland) Marek's Trabant 601 (1981) (Presented by Fat Joe)
  - The chassis of the car was completely rusted out, and needed a donor car to replace many of its parts.
  - Since the owner was practicing to be a chef, a stove and table were installed in the trunk.
  - The car was fitted with 16-inch white rims, given an orange paint job, and a checkered roof.
2. (Portugal) Ronny's Datsun 310 Cherry (1981) (Presented by Lil' Jon)
  - Painted in cherry red with two raging strips down the middle of the car.
  - Custom twin round lights were fitted front and rear, giving the car a "mini" muscle-car or rally-car look.
  - This car was used by three generations of his family.
3. (Netherlands) Cecila's Citroën ZX (ca 1993) (Presented by Fat Joe)
  - Painted in pink
4. Emil and Jonas' Audi 80L (1973) (Presented by Lil' Jon)
  - The car was owned by identical twins, who lived together in Sweden and both performed in the Christian black metal band Admonish.
  - The car was modified to give a goth appearance.
  - Unique touches included plastic human body parts embedded under fake leather on the car's bonnet boot and roof, and a grille to scare off forest trolls.
5. (France) Djibril Cissé's Dodge Ram Van (1984) (Presented by Fat Joe)
  - The van belonged to Djibril Cissé who, after pimping his own prestige cars, wanted to see what the garage could do to his old van.
  - Airbrushed with an A-Team style paint job and fitted with a fully custom hand-made 300c body kit.
6. (Germany) Carolin's Opel Kadett Cabrio (1990) (Presented by Lil' Jon)
  - This car was a rigged convertible topless and hatches of spiders inside the car.
