= Pimp My Ride UK =

British reality TV show hosted by Lady Leshurr

- Created by: Bruce Beresford-Redman; Rick Hurvitz
- Presented by: Tim Westwood (2005–2007); Lady Leshurr (2022)
- Country of origin: United Kingdom

Production
- Production company: MTV Series Development

Original release
- Network: MTV UK
- Release: 26 June 2005 – 6 May 2007
- Network: YouTube
- Release: 19 August – 30 September 2022

Pimp My Ride UK was a British reality television series. The programme initially ran on MTV UK from 2005 to 2007 and was revived as a show for MTV's YouTube channel in 2022. The show is an adaption of the American MTV series Pimp My Ride, featuring one car in each episode being renovated and customized ("pimped") to match the owner's interests. The first three series were hosted by English DJ Tim Westwood, with the renovation and customizing done by Carisma Automotive. The 2022 reboot was hosted by rapper Lady Leshurr, with the work being carried out by Ashford-based tuning centre and body shop, Wrench Studios.

== Episodes ==
=== Season 1 (2005) ===
Ep1 1.1 Bethan Jones' Morris Minor (1961)

  - The owner of the car wanted to be pimped so it could be her wedding car. The headrests had custom embroidered "Mr." and "Mrs." (Mrs on the driver's side, naturally), as well as a matching love seat in the boot. Surfboards were resting on a new roof rack, and since Bethan was "really into" photography the garage install a laptop, printer, digital camera, plus a mobile phone to upload pictures on the go.

Ep2 1.2 Asif Nawab's Volkswagen Golf Mark II (1989)

  - The Golf was made over with Lamborghini-style doors.

Ep3 1.3 Jay Rotheram's Ford Granada Hearse (1983)

  - The funeral car was pimped for Jay and his band to perform gigs in.

Ep4 1.4 Armick Abolian's Fiat Panda (1987)

  - The Panda was pimped with a trailer containing skate equipment.
  - It also had three bucket seats installed.

Ep5 1.5 Sean Egan's Ford Capri (1986)

  - The interior was decorated with over one thousand Swarovski crystals. Sean sold the car on, and it had several owners after this. Its last known owner was restoring back to factory standard, but has not been seen since 2017.

Ep6 1.6 Bez's Black Cab (1988)

  - Starring also Davina McCall from Big Brother.
  - Ironically, the car was originally a sleeper before being rebuilt, with Bez having spent his Big Brother prize money on a Chevrolet V8 and race exhaust.
  - The sound and video system included a DJ turntable, twenty speakers, eight amps, two DVD players, fifteen TV screens and a camera on the grille linked to one of the screens.
  - The sign on top of the car saying "TAXI" was changed to say "PIMP".

=== Season 2 (2006) ===
Ep8 2.1 Chris' Nissan Sunny (1988)

  - Chris won his car in a Poker game. Due to the rough condition of the bodywork, a mint-condition donor car was used for its parts.

Ep9 2.2 Adam's BMW 316i E30 (1989)

  - Adam obviously did not have trouble sleeping before filming. Instead of answering the door, Westwood had to wake him up!
  - The car had an additional taekwondo training boot on his car trunk.

Ep10 2.3 Zoë's Volkswagen Split Screen Camper Van (1967)

  - Zoë was actually conceived in her own campervan dubbed "The Beastie",
  - The car had been in her family for nearly 40 years.

Ep11 2.4 Lana's Volkswagen Polo (1991)

  - Lana had been a flight attendant and was trying to earn a Private Pilot License at the time of the filming. The car was fitted with actual Boeing 747 seats.
  - Lana likes party, the car added a beauty kit on side trolley inside her car.

Ep12 2.5 Jamie's Suzuki Swift GTi (1991)

  - Jamie was given a hand cast of his favourite actor, and of course Westwood. The car was covered in vinyl stickers in his favourite Japanese style.

Ep13 2.6 Sheerin's Volkswagen Beetle (1969)

  - Sheerin's Beetle was given a custom cowskin paint job on the roof, and had a mosaic floor to reflect her Middle-Eastern heritage.

Ep14 R 2.7 Lawrence's Ford Anglia (1959)

  - As Lawrence was a fan of 1950s culture, the car was pimped in the style of a 1950s hotrod. An American style diner was installed in the boot. It was advertised for sale in the March 2007 issue of Custom Car Magazine and the May 2007 issue of Retro Ford.

Ep15 2.8 Hannah's Kia Pride (1991)

  - On the way to the garage, Westwood blew up the engine.

Ep16 2.9 Danny's Bedford Rascal (1990)

Ep17 2.10 Jono's Volkswagen Type 2 Pickup (1979)

  - No fewer than 12 panels were replaced before paint, then a hot tub, complete with colour changing (chromotherapy) jets was added.

=== Special: Pimp Madonna's Ride ===
Ep7 (next episode after series 1 episode 6) 19/02/2006

1. Madonna's Volkswagen LT White van (2000)
  - The interior of the van was pimped by MTV UK for the music video "Sorry" which was filmed in London in January 2006. The exterior of the vehicle was kept original. A special episode of the show called 'Pimp Madonna's Ride' aired on MTV on Sunday 19 February 2006, the eve of the release of the single "Sorry".

=== Ep18 Special: Comic Relief Special ===
1. LDV 400 Series Minibus (1994)
  - This was pimped as part of the 2007 Comic Relief appeal, the "Community Volunteer Transport" of the Staffordshire Moorlands. The van features an LCD screen bingo game that is linked behind each seat of the bus for the elderly passengers.

=== Season 3 (2007) ===
Ep19 3.2 Oli's 15 April 2007 Renault Clio RT (1991)

Ep20 3.3 Robin's 22 April 2007 Ford Transit (1992)

  - The van was used as a tour bus for Robin and his band, Playground Legend. It had a recording studio with a sofa in the rear, and the outside was decorated with the band's logo and a picture of the band members.

Ep21 3.4 Abi's 29 April 2007 Mini Van (1999)

Ep22 3.5 Dave's 6 May 2007 Ford Fiesta (1994)

Ep23 3.6 Nadeem Daimler (1990)

=== MTV UK YouTube Revival (2022) ===
Ep1 Say Konnichiwa To This Pimped-Out GTO | Kieran's Mitsubishi GTO

- Young factory worker Kieran puts his heart, soul and every last penny he makes into restoring his purple GTO. With help from the Wrench team, it’s not long before it gets some much-needed Fast & Furious-inspired upgrades.

Ep2 This Citroen goes from Grey to Gremlincore | Tom's Citroën C1

- Gremlin-core gangster, Tom dropped in at Wrench with his Citroën C1 ( named ‘Mould’) and, boy did they deliver—with a variety of upgrades, including artificial moss floors and leather mushroom embroidered seats found on eBay!

Ep3 This Classic Beetle Gets A Modern Facelift | Jake & Emma's 1966 Volkswagen Beetle

- When BMX-loving couple Jake and Emma hit up the Wrench garage to help them pimp their 1966 VW Betty the Beetle, they had a complete facelift in mind. And, it wasn’t long before this bug got the biggest pimping—taking her from Ugly Betty to Betty the Beautiful, with an all-star revamp complete with a bespoke BMX roof rack found on eBay!

Ep4 Vauxhall Transformation Fit For A Rap Star | "Rae Rae" Raven's 2006 Vauxhall Zafira

- When Croydon rapper Raven travelled around the country in her battered Vauxhall Zafira, she dreamed of a VIP pimp-mobile fit for a superstar MC. After all, she should be writing bangers, not driving them! This busted whip needed an overhaul and it certainly got one—using Certified Recycled parts found on eBay.

Ep5 This Ford gets an Upcycled Upgrade | Yaz's Ford KA

- With a love of sustainable clothing, upcycling, social media and sewing—Yaz wanted to pimp her pride and joy Ford KA with a sustainable twist. And, after the Wrench crew got to work on her baby, she certainly wasn’t disappointed as they mixed old with new. Thanks to some Certified Recycled parts from old KA’s found on eBay, this banger got a facelift in no time.

Ep6 Whipping Up A Makeover For This Ice Cream Van | Naomi's Vintage Ice Cream Van

- Naomi and her colleagues have been using their vintage ice cream van to help the local community. Now, with split rims, new tail lights and neon under glow.
