= Chris Goldfinger =

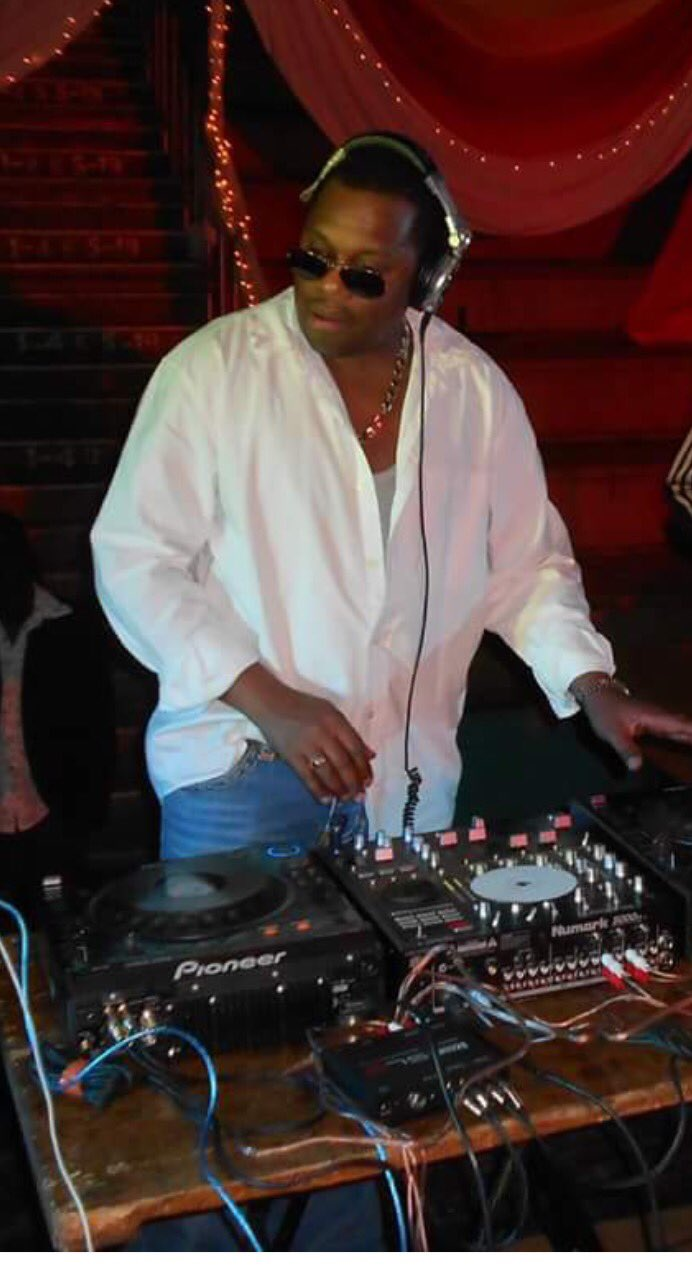
Chris Goldfinger (2017)

Christopher Clarke, known professionally as Chris Goldfinger, is a former BBC Radio 1 disc jockey who presented the station's reggae dancehall show from 1996 to September 2009.

His programme was produced by Tim Westwood's production company Justice Productions, and Goldfinger frequently appears at club nights DJing alongside Westwood. He grew up in Jamaica and attended the high school Jamaica College. He has interviewed many artists over the years at Radio 1 including Damian Marley, Beenie Man, Chaka Demus and Pliers, Capleton, and Barrington Levy.

== Current ventures ==
In the latter part of 2009, Goldfinger departed from the reggae dancehall show, a post he held for 13 years. Since his departure, he has appeared on the 1Xtra Dancehall Mix show (filling in for Young Lion). He stated that he will be “passing through 1Xtra more, once he has the time.” He was scheduled to open a new club in Croydon simply called ‘The Club,’ and to have a show on Flava TV channel.

In 2012, Goldfinger joined OnTop FM.

Goldfinger is the owner of the party venue in Croydon called Tabú Lounge. He tours extensively in places such as Zimbabwe, Gambia, and Jamaica.

Goldfinger contributes the intro and mid-show drop on the 'Original Flavaz mixshow with B-Eazy & Dubsoulvibe' on TrunkOfunk Radio available on Mixcloud every last Sunday of the month. Goldfinger and B-Eazy hosted an 'Original Flavaz' mix show special which was broadcast on 26 February 2017.

Goldfinger's Reggae Dancehall show became popular and was subsequently broadcast on 17 different media outlets worldwide; Ontop FM, Stingdem FM, TGM Radio, Vibes 106.1 (Gambia), Urban FM, ABCi Radio (Scotland), Fresh FM, Passion Radio (UK), Sandwell Radio, Slam Radio, Brum City Radio, Skyline Radio, Peoples 104.5FM, Juice FM, Vibez FM (Birmingham), Roc Solid Radio and Riddim One Radio (Jamaica). A further 5 more stations has been added to the list, making it 22 stations globally the Chris GOLDFINGER Reggae Dancehall show is played out on.

His soul music show, the Sunday Soul Serenade Show on Ontop FM, Riddim One Radio, Silk Radio, and Outtadabox Radio and Koffee Radio is broadcast every Sunday which features soul classics from the 1950s to the '80s.
