= Carisma Automotive =

Carisma Automotive is a UK-based automotive shop which specializes in customized interiors, paint, tyres, and other accessories, founded in 1996. Its founder and head is Jamie Shaw, who claimed he was a former employee of Rolls-Royce. From 2005 to 2007, the company was featured on Pimp My Ride UK, the UK version of MTV's Pimp My Ride television series, where Carisma Automotive served as the British equivalent to the original series' West Coast Customs.

On Pimp My Ride UK, cars were gutted, given high-end new interiors, paint jobs, lightweight rims, and outfitted with various electronic accessories. The car was also usually given special features to suit the owner. For example, one owner received a complete digital photo editing and printing system built into the seats of her car.
