= Pimpmobile =

Name for an extravagantly customized luxury car

A pimpmobile is a large luxury vehicle, usually a 1960s, 1970s or 1980s-model Lincoln, Cadillac, Buick or Chrysler vehicle, that has been customized in a garish, extravagant and kitsch or campy style. The style is largely an American phenomenon.

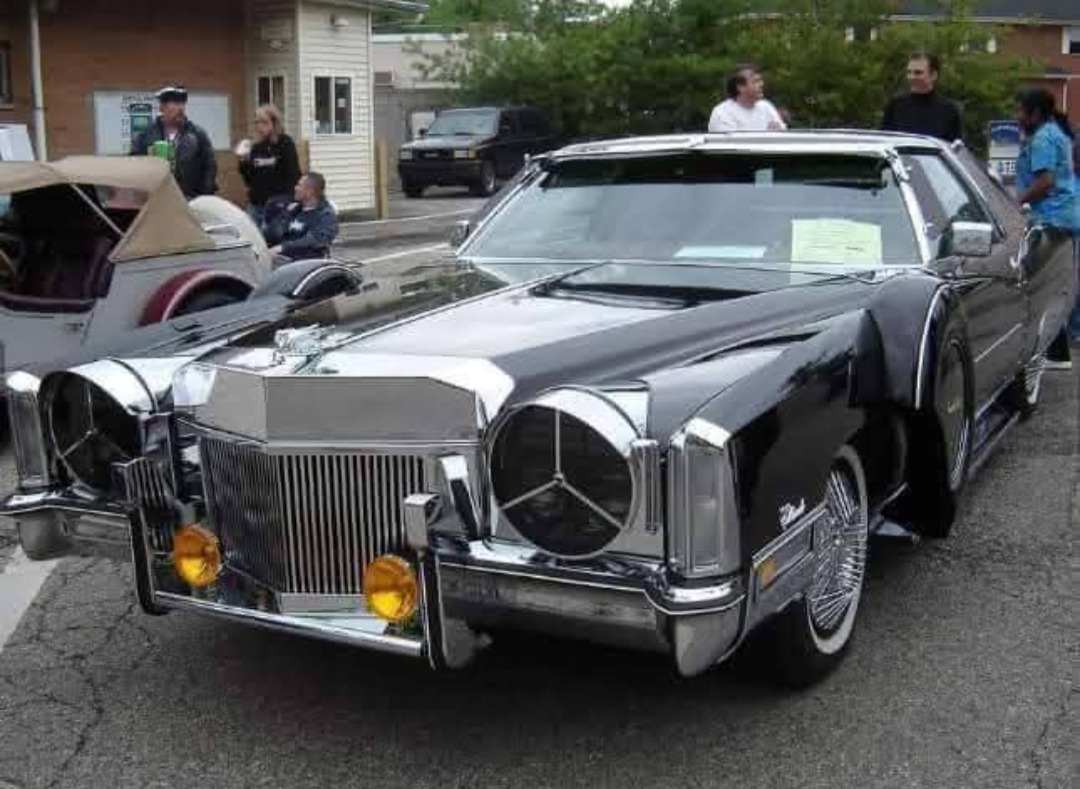
1971-72 Cadillac "Superfly" Fleetwood Eldorado Pimpmobile that was custom built by the shop Dunham Coach in Boonton, New Jersey in the 1970s. The customization includes the round "Superfly" headlight covers and the large custom front chrome grille.

The customization includes the round "Superfly" headlight covers, the large custom front chrome grille, front custom chrome hood cap, goddess hood ornament, custom chrome front bumpers, custom front fog lights, and custom chrome windshield sun visor.

Aftermarket features or modifications such as headlight covers, hood ornaments, expensive stereo systems, unusual paint colors, and shag carpet interiors were used by car owners to advertise their wealth and importance. Once considered a pejorative, these customized vehicles were popular with pimps, drug dealers, and gang leaders in the ghettos of large cities of the United States in the late 1960s, 1970s and 1980s, especially New York City, Kansas City, Chicago, Oakland and Los Angeles as a symbol of their wealth and power. By the 1990s and 2000s, pimpmobiles included any large, extravagantly customized vehicle, including foreign makes such as Mercedes Benz, Infiniti, Lexus, BMW, Range Rovers, Porsche, Jaguar, Bentleys, Audi and Volvo as well as SUVs and trucks.

== History ==
Pimpmobiles became part of popular culture when they were depicted in 1970s blaxploitation films that targeted the urban black audience with black actors and soundtracks of funk and soul music. Blaxploitation films tend to take place in the ghetto, dealing with pimps and drug dealers, often with stereotyped depiction of blacks. Heavily-customized pimpmobiles appeared in blaxploitation films such as Super Fly, The Mack, and Willie Dynamite as well as mainstream films like Magnum Force, D.C. Cab, Escape from New York, and the James Bond movie Live and Let Die. In the 2000s, they appeared in the 2002 comedies Austin Powers in Goldmember and Undercover Brother. The conversions became popular with Americans of all races, and several companies manufactured kits to convert late-model cars to pimpmobiles.

The most popular cars for this customization were Cadillacs and Lincolns, especially the Cadillac Eldorado and Lincoln Continental produced between 1971 and 1978. However, lower luxury models such as Chryslers, Buicks and Oldsmobiles were also common. The cars used for these conversions were originally targeted at well-to-do retirees who wanted a large luxury vehicle; however, with the "pimpmobile" conversions, the cars came to signify menace, mystique, and glamor. One notable exception is the "Corvorado" used in the movie Live and Let Die, which was a Chevrolet Corvette C3 with Eldorado body panels. Conversion was done by custom car shops across the country such as George Barris, E & G Classics and Auto Gard, Inc., as well as many smaller shops. A well-known pimpmobile fabricator was Les Dunham of Dunham Coachworks in Boonton, New Jersey. Les built the cars in Super Fly, as well as the "Corvorado" and the Cadillac Fleetwood in the James Bond film.

A pimpmobile was referenced in William DeVaughn's song "Be Thankful for What You Got": "Diamond in the back, sunroof top, diggin' the scene with a gangsta lean. Gangsta whitewalls, TV antennas in the back."

== Customization ==
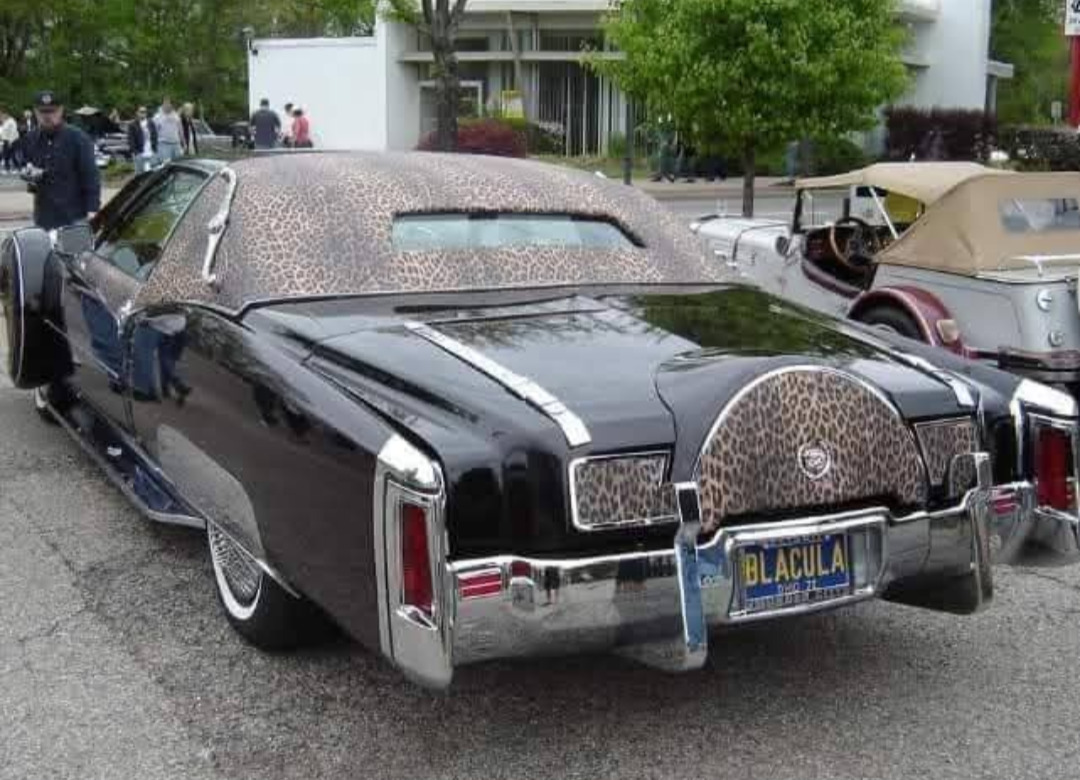
The rear of the 1971-72 Cadillac "Superfly" Fleetwood Eldorado Pimpmobile, that was custom built by the shop Dunham Coach in Boonton, New Jersey in the 1970s. The rear customization includes the chrome trunk door belt straps, round continental tire "hump" on the trunk door, and custom rear chrome bumpers.

Typically, a pimpmobile conversion includes such items as round headlight covers (commonly known as "Superfly" headlights), grille caps, a 1941 "goddess"-style hood ornament, "Lake pipes", thick padded vinyl tops, wide whitewall tires (nicknamed "Gangsta Walls"), chrome hubcaps with spokes, custom-designed, high-end stereo systems, and shag or velour interiors. The dashboard area might be enhanced with aftermarket steering wheels or tachometers mounted on top of the dash. Custom paint jobs were common, often in non-traditional or garish colors like purple or orange, with special touches such as using two colors of paint (for the upper and lower parts of the body), metal flake or pearlescent paint, or pinstriping. Some car owners also added custom murals or airbrushed images on the hood. The most status-obsessed customizers even added small crystal chandeliers for interior lighting and small 12 volt-powered colour TVs, VCRs, bar-size refrigerators, and, in a few rare cases, in which former hearses were converted into pimpmobiles, a small bed in the backseat area.

Customizing shops included Dunham Coach in Boonton, New Jersey; Wisco, Harper and Universal in Detroit; and E&G in Baltimore. While individuals could add some of the simpler "dress up" options themselves or have them added by a local mechanic, these specialized shops handled more expensive, complicated modifications, such as extending the fenders or hood, converting a four-door sedan into a two-door car, and having bumpers or other parts re-chrome plated. In Southern California, custom hydraulic suspensions (as usual with lowriders) were also popular. While many pimpmobile modifications are done with the goal of "dressing up" the appearance, some people also do engine modifications to increase engine performance, such as overboring cylinders or adding aftermarket intake manifolds, carburetors, or dual exhaust systems with "cherry bomb"-style mufflers.

Large luxury sedans have been on a decline since the early 1980s where sport utilities (SUVs) such as the Cadillac Escalade and Lincoln Navigator have been used for pimpmobile conversions. Non-American cars, including Mercedes-Benz, Rolls-Royce and Lexus have replaced large cars as latter-day pimpmobiles. During the transition, pimpmobiles still retain the aftermarket grille conversions, although aftermarket rims have built inroads (e.g. 22" to 30" rims are most popular, although smaller, usually 14" or 15" wire wheels are still popular). The TV show Pimp My Ride would usually customize a vehicle other than a Cadillac or Lincoln (for example, Chevrolet Caprice or Ford Crown Victoria). The vehicles created were "pimped" or extravagantly customized, but not always made into classic pimpmobiles. With Cadillac Escalades, modifications are done both by third-party private shops and by Cadillac factories, which accept modification orders such as larger wheels, increased engine performance and custom paint. Cadillac Escalades are seen in many hip hop music videos, and the comedian Bernie Mac was seen driving an Escalade on his sitcom.

== See also ==
- Hi-riser
- Lowrider
- Cadillac Eldorado
- Lincoln Continental
- Rice burner
