= Tim Westwood =

British DJ and television host (born 1957)

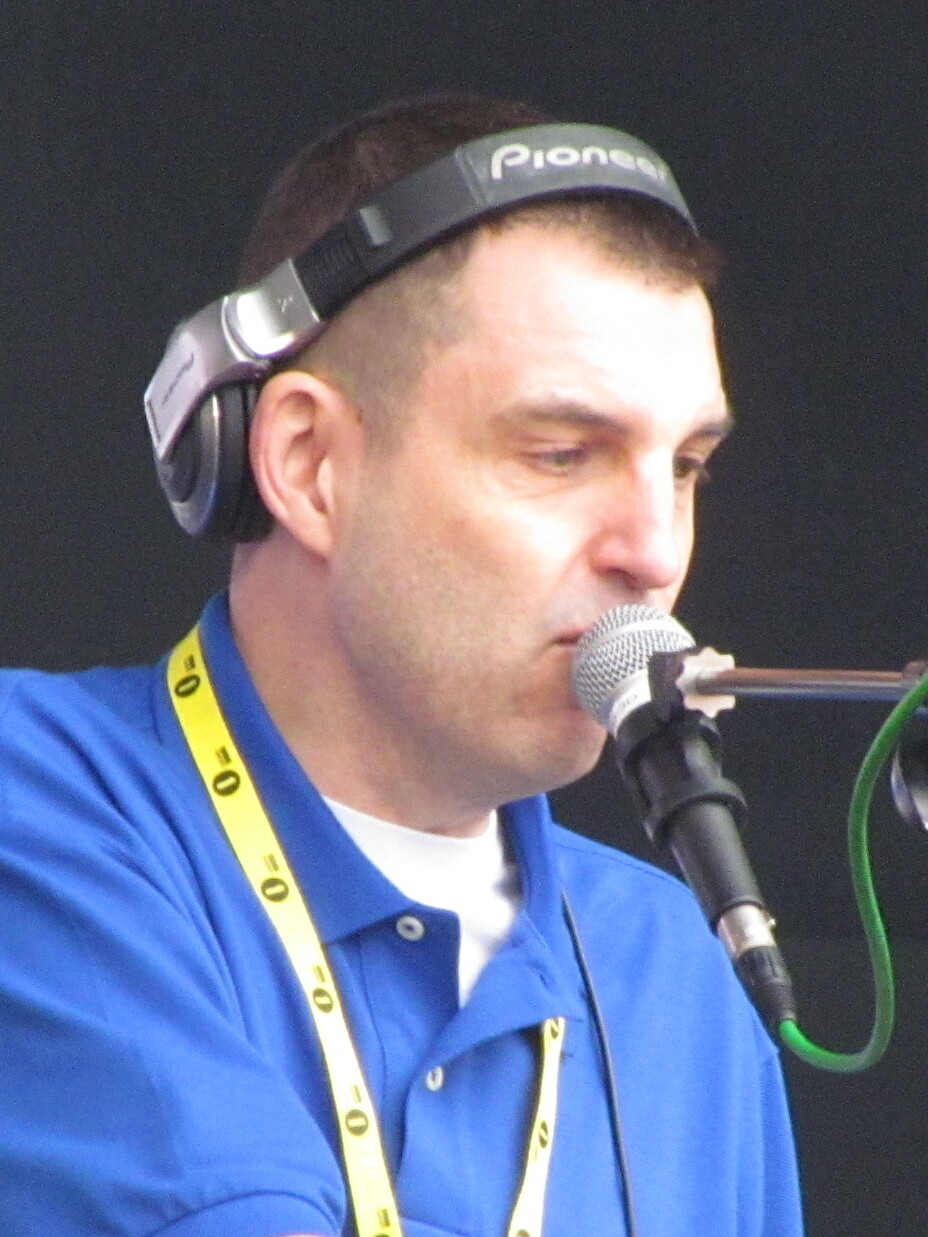
- Westwood in 2012

Background information
- Born: Timothy Westwood; 3 October 1957 (age 69); Lowestoft, Suffolk, England
- Genres: Hip hop; grime; R&B; dancehall; reggae
- Occupations: Radio DJ; television presenter
- Years active: 1984–2025
- Label: Mercury
- Website: Official website

Timothy Westwood (born 3 October 1957), often known professionally simply as Westwood, is a British DJ and presenter. He was described by The Guardian in 2022 as "a veteran of the hip-hop scene whose opinions have been able to make or break upcoming artists for more than 30 years". He hosted the Radio 1 rap show and presented the MTV UK show Pimp My Ride UK. In 2013, he left Radio 1 and 1Xtra after nearly twenty years and returned to Capital Radio.

Investigations by the BBC and The Guardian into Westwood's sexual conduct found seven women who accused Westwood of sexual misconduct between 1992 and 2017, as described in the 2022 BBC Three documentary Tim Westwood: Abuse of Power. In October 2025 he was charged with committing multiple sexual offences between 1983 and 2016, and in September 2026 with two earlier offences, in 1991 and 2004; he is to be tried on a total of seventeen charges in January 2027.

== Early life ==
Timothy Westwood was born on 3 October 1957 in Lowestoft, Suffolk, England. The son of Bill Westwood, who later became Anglican Bishop of Peterborough, Westwood spent his early years in Lowestoft, where his father was parish priest, and moved to Norwich aged eight, when his father became vicar of St Peter Mancroft. He attended the independent Norwich School and the state comprehensive Hewett School in Norwich. He was diagnosed as dyslexic, and later said that, when at school, he was bottom of his class, "clueless at work and poor at sports."

== Career ==
=== Live ===
Westwood's career started in the late 1970s and early 1980s when he helped set up sound systems in clubs in northwest London, taking opportunities to work as a DJ, and then warming up for David Rodigan. At the time, he played reggae and jazz-funk.

Westwood was injured in a drive-by shooting in Kennington, south London, on 18 July 1999, after he had been playing at the Lambeth Country Show in Brockwell Park. According to police reports, gunmen on a motorbike pulled up alongside his Range Rover and shot him and his assistant. He alleged that the gunmen were gang members who had been threatening him to stop playing shows in the neighbourhood.

=== Radio ===
Westwood's first radio show was on the London pirate radio station LWR. He then moved to Kiss FM, which he co-owned. He was on Capital FM from 1987, and in 1994 he moved to BBC Radio 1 to present its new rap show. The show was launched with a live concert with the Notorious B.I.G. and Puff Daddy. The Westwood Radio 1 Rap Show was the top ranked hip hop show in the UK. His Radio 1 show was produced by his independent company Justice Entertainment, which also produced Chris Goldfinger's dancehall show for Radio 1 at the time. As of 2004 Westwood was a patron of the internal radio station at Feltham Young Offenders' Institution in west London.

At the BBC, Westwood also hosted the weekday drivetime show for Radio 1Xtra from September 2009 until he was replaced by Charlie Sloth in September 2012. After leaving the drivetime show, Westwood continued his Saturday night Rap Show which now ran from 21:00 until 23:00 and was a simulcast on Radio 1 and 1Xtra. It was announced on 26 July 2013 that he was leaving the BBC after nearly twenty years as part of planned schedule changes, which took effect on 21 September.

After leaving the BBC, Westwood re-joined Capital FM on its sister station, Capital Xtra, initially occupying the 21:00–23:00 slot on Saturday nights. His show on Capital Xtra then moved to 19:00–22:00, followed by 19:00–0:00, and then 19:00–23:00.

=== Television ===
After creating and presenting the 1987 BBC Open Space documentary "Bad Meaning Good," he achieved further TV exposure in the late 1980s as part of ITV's late-night programming block Night Network, for which he hosted the programmes N Sign Radio and The Rap Show.

He later presented a series of his own television programmes on UKTV channel UK Play, which has since ceased broadcasting.

==== Pimp My Ride ====
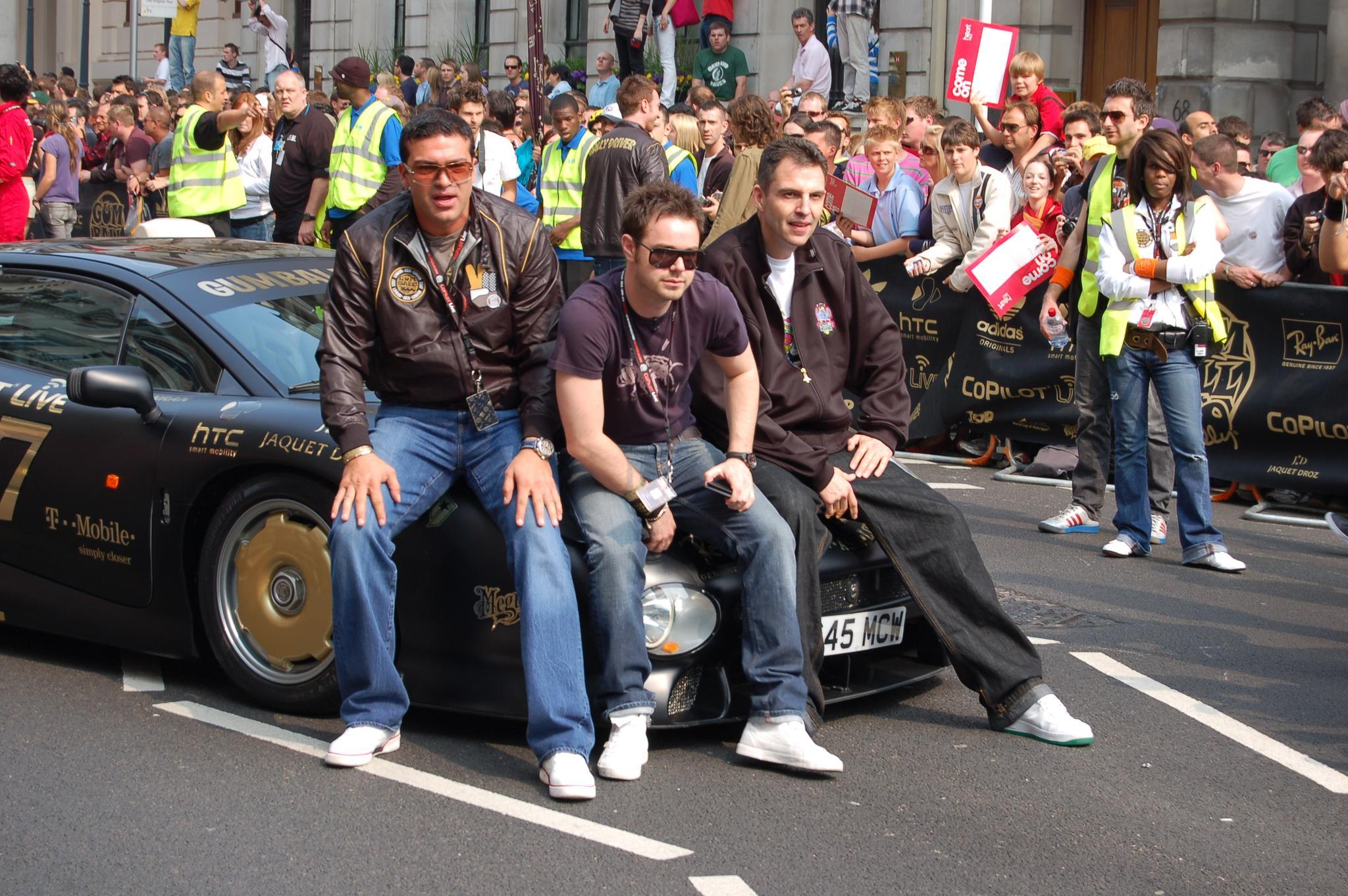
Westwood (furthest right) at Gumball 3000 in 2007

Westwood hosted the MTV series Pimp My Ride UK which ran for three seasons, from 2005 to 2007. The show was an adaption of the American MTV series Pimp My Ride, featuring one car in each episode being renovated and customized ("pimped") to match the owner's interests.

A special episode of the show called "Pimp Madonna's Ride" aired on MTV on Sunday 19 February 2006, the eve of the release of the single "Sorry". The interior of the van was pimped by MTV UK for the single's music video, which was filmed in London in January 2006. The exterior of the vehicle was kept original. At the time, Pimp My Ride UK was the most successful MTV UK production of all time and the second highest rated show in the history of MTV Europe.

==== Tim Westwood TV ====
Westwood's official YouTube channel Tim Westwood TV has over 500 million video views and over 1 million subscribers. The channel has videos of freestyles and interviews from hip-hop and grime artists, including The Notorious B.I.G., Eminem, Jay-Z, Nas, Lil Wayne, Nicki Minaj, Will Smith, Drake, Amerado, and Rae Sremmurd.

=== Albums and awards ===
Westwood has released fourteen compilation albums. The Platinum Edition compilation was the biggest-selling British urban album of all time upon its release in 2003.

Westwood has won the 2016 Legacy Award at the GRM Daily Rated Awards, the 2010 Radio Academy John Peel Award for Outstanding Contribution to Music and the MOBO Awards for Best Radio DJ in 2000, 2003, 2005, 2007 and 2008. He was nominated for Sony Radio's Music Broadcaster of the Year award in 2003 and 2006.

=== Self-presentation ===
On 6 June 2006, Radio 1 and Westwood's show in particular was accused of encouraging knife and gun crime by the Leader of the Conservative Party and then Leader of the Opposition, David Cameron, who was speaking at a British Society of Magazine Editors event. Radio 1 controller Andy Parfitt responded in a Press Association news agency article: "There's been a debate about this particular genre of music for many years. Hip-hop is of great interest to many people in our audience. I strongly refute that any of our programmes condone violence, gun crime or knife crime". Critics have derided Westwood's apparent Black British pronunciation and dialect. In interviews, Sacha Baron Cohen has stated that Westwood, including his accent, was an inspiration for his fictional Ali G character. Westwood has also been accused in the media of giving false statements about his age and background. In 2000, at the age of 43, Westwood insisted to a Guardian journalist that he was aged 27.

== Sexual assault allegations ==
In July 2020, Global Media & Entertainment, the parent company of Capital Xtra, was criticised for failing to investigate allegations that Westwood had behaved inappropriately with young female fans. Westwood responded: "I can confirm that such allegations are false and without any foundation." In April 2022, as a result of a joint investigation by BBC News and The Guardian, covered in the BBC Three documentary Tim Westwood: Abuse of Power, Westwood was accused by seven women of sexual misconduct between 1992 and 2017. He denied the allegations. Nevertheless, Global, Capital's parent company, announced in late April 2022 that he was stepping down from his show until further notice, while several venues cancelled appearances by Westwood.

The Sunday Times reported in July 2022 that seventeen women had made allegations against Westwood. He also faced an allegation from a woman that they had sex when she was fourteen, which is illegal in the UK. In August 2022, the Metropolitan Police confirmed that they were investigating allegations against Westwood of sexual offences. In November 2024, the Metropolitan Police submitted the evidence they had collected to the Crown Prosecution Service to consider whether to bring charges.

The BBC director general Tim Davie described the allegations as "shocking", though also stated that he could find no previous formal complaints about Westwood. In July 2022, following a Freedom of Information request in relation to the BBC and Guardian investigation, the BBC said it had received six complaints about Westwood and referred one to the police. The BBC commissioned an independent investigation by King's Counsel Gemma White to determine whether or not the BBC knew of the allegations during Westwood's nearly-20-year career with them. The report was published in February 2025 and included 22 allegations, only two of which had been included in the original investigation by the BBC and The Guardian.

In October 2025, Westwood was charged with four counts of rape, nine counts of indecent assault, and two counts of sexual assault, relating to alleged offences against seven women between 1983 and 2016. He appeared at Southwark Crown Court on 8 December, pleaded not guilty to the charges of rape, sexual assault and indecent assault, and was granted bail until his trial, which is due to begin in January 2027. In September 2026, Westwood was charged with an additional two charges: an indecent assault in 1991 in Hammersmith and Fulham against a teenage girl aged 16–17, and a sexual assault in 2004 in Wandsworth of an 18-year-old woman. This brings Westwood's total charges to seventeen, involving a total of nine women.

== Discography ==
- Street Beats
- Westwood Volume 1
- Westwood Volume 2
- Westwood Volume 3
- UK Hip Hop 2002 Volume 1
- Westwood Platinum Edition 2003
- Westwood: The Jump Off
- Westwood 6: The Takeover
- Westwood 7: The Big Dawg
- Westwood 8: The Invasion
- Westwood Heat: Volume 9
- Westwood X
- Westwood 11: Ride with the Big Dawg
- Westwood: The Greatest
- Westwood: Hip Hop Club Bangers

== DVD ==
- Westwood Raw DVD
