= Pimp My Ride =

American television series and franchise

- Created by: Bruce Beresford-Redman; Rick Hurvitz
- Presented by: Xzibit
- Theme music composer: Jeff Cardoni
- Country of origin: United States
- No. of seasons: 6
- No. of episodes: 73 (list of episodes)

Production
- Executive producers: Bruce Beresford-Redman; Rick Hurvitz; Larry Hochberg
- Producers: Jennifer Colbert; Tess Gamboa; Joel Raatz; Mark Ryan; Brian York
- Cinematography: Scott Sandman
- Editors: Brian York; Mike Bary; Stephen Baumhauer
- Running time: 27 minutes
- Production companies: R-Lab; MTV Series Development

Original release
- Network: MTV
- Release: March 4, 2004 – June 9, 2007

Pimp My Ride is a staged American television series produced by MTV and hosted by rapper Xzibit, which ran for six seasons on MTV from 2004 to 2007. In each episode, a car in poor condition is both restored and customized. The work on the show was done by West Coast Customs until season 5 and was done by Galpin Auto Sports thereafter.

The show has several international adaptations, including Pimp My Ride UK, Pimp My Ride International (in central Europe), and other adaptations in Brazil, Indonesia and the Baltic countries. It also spawned similar spinoffs, including the series Trick My Truck on MTV's sister network CMT.

The show was criticized by several participants for exaggerating or faking several aspects of the restorations and many aspects of the show.

In 2024, Pimp My Ride co-creator Rick Hurvitz brought a re-tooled version of the show to Netflix. Now titled Resurrected Rides, Hurvitz is an executive producer. Chris Redd serves as host, with a team of mechanics and customizers from several different California-area auto shops working on the cars.

== Format ==
An episode generally begins with the participant, a young vehicle owner from Los Angeles or elsewhere in Southern California, showing off their vehicle to convince MTV it needs to be "pimped". After this segment, the host, Xzibit (Chamillionaire in one episode), takes a look at the participant's car himself and makes wisecracks about the particular things that are wrong with it. He then surprises the participant at their house and the participant shows off their vehicle while Xzibit continues to make wisecracks about the particular things that are wrong with it. After examining the car, Xzibit promises the participant a complete makeover of the vehicle and takes it to a custom body shop (West Coast Customs (WCC), in Corona, California, in Seasons 1–4; replaced by Galpin Auto Sports (GAS) in Van Nuys starting Season 5).

At the body shop, the shop team generally replaces most of the car's components and rebuilds the interior and exterior from scratch. The cars are "pimped" based on the hobbies and/or occupations of the owners. For example, a Need for Speed: Underground fan had his car painted to look like one specially customized in the Need for Speed video game series, while a bowler had a ball spinner installed in his trunk, a badminton player had a badminton net installed in the back of his Dodge Caravan, and a surfer got a clothes dryer in the back of his Volkswagen Type 2. Work usually includes new paint, accessories, chrome, tires, rims, and internal electronics (DVD players, video games, large TFT screens, and other accessories). Most changes are only cosmetic, and mechanical work is generally only done to enable the car to run, but the show has occasionally replaced car engines.

At the end of the show, the car is revealed to its owner, as well as all the details of the renovation and the custom features; in addition, the participant is usually given a gift somehow related to the car or their hobby.

== Cast ==
=== Seasons 1–4 ===
The West Coast Customs employees shown on the series included:

- Quinton "Q" Dodson - Good-natured manager (seasons 1–3)
- Ryan Friedlinghaus - Owner
- Alex - Heavily-pierced tire specialist
- Ishmael "Ish" Jimenez - Tough-looking interior and fabric maven
- Michael "Mad Mike" Martin - Electronics (and outrageous engineering) expert
- "Big Dane" - Appropriately named accessories specialist
- Aren, Buck, 2Shae, and Luis - Paint. The latter carried on into the following seasons.

After the third season, WCC manager "Q" announced that he would not be willing to take a role in the show anymore. Q cited a desire to expand the company's business with a customs shop in St. Louis, Missouri called Coast 2 Coast Customs. Ryan Friedlinghaus, the owner of WCC, was featured in Season 4 as the "lead" for discussions on customizing the cars.

=== Seasons 5–6 ===
In the fifth season, the show moved to another garage, Galpin Auto Sports (GAS), as Ryan, the WCC Owner, moved his shop to Corona, California and signed a deal with another television production company. However, the show retained Mad Mike (who quit at WCC and signed at GAS), now dubbed a "car customization specialist". The new cast consisted of:

- "Owner" Beau Boeckmann (in reality, Vice President of Galpin Auto; the owner of Galpin Auto was his father, Bert Boeckmann)
- Michael "Mad Mike" Martin - Electronics expert and "The Wizard of Wiring"
- "Jason" Ewing - Wiring and fiberglass fabrication
- Gyasi - Wheels and tires specialist
- Luis - Paint & body
- Diggity Dave - Accessories specialist
- Rick - Interiors
- Cabe Sipes - Fabricator
- Z - Shop crew

== Replacement vehicles ==
On three occasions – all season finales – the show did not "pimp" the original automobile.

- In the final episode of season 1, the car to be pimped was actually two-halves of Ford Escorts welded together to make one car, a "cut and shut" job, and was declared unsafe.
- In the final episode of season 2, the participant was studying to be an auto mechanic, and WCC decided to let him "pimp" his car as a study project.
- In the final episode of season 5, Xzibit felt that the owner's car, a Nissan Pulsar, was not worth fixing, as heat from the car's engine and battery fluid was leaking into the cab, creating a fire hazard.

In all these instances, the vehicles of the participants were replaced with brand new cars, with extensive modifications made to customize each new car for the owner.

== Worldwide popularity ==
Pimp My Ride was one of MTV's most popular shows with nearly all of its worldwide viewers, and also in the U.S., where it ranked second only to The Real World.

Canada's music network, MuchMusic, aired the show until MTV Networks signed a deal with CTV, which resulted in MuchMusic losing their rights to MTV programs. MuchMusic's French-language sister station, MusiquePlus, aired the show subtitled in French under the title Pimp mon char ("char" is Quebec French slang for "car"). The show would eventually re-air on Much in the Summer of 2008, showing the later seasons.

Pimp My Ride was broadcast in Arab countries on both MTV Arabia and MBC Action.

In 2012, MTV Southeast Asia aired the first episode of Pimp My Ride Malaysia, which is sponsored by Celcom Axiata under its Xpax’s Whatchuwant? campaign, giving Xpax customers a chance to have their vehicles worked on by MTV, hosted by Altimet and Herrera.

== Claims of deception by participants ==
Several participants who appeared on seasons 4 and 6 of Pimp My Ride later stated that elements of the show were either exaggerated or faked. The houses where Xzibit would surprise contestants with the news they were selected were often rented by MTV. The initial poor condition of some of the vehicles was staged to look worse, including the removal of paint, trash in the interior, and bumpers loosened to the point of falling off. Some features added during filming were removed immediately afterwards due to potential issues with local and state traffic laws, and the participants noted that multiple takes were needed to film their reactions during the final reveal. Some were coached to express more amazement and enthusiasm between takes. The overhaul process, which appeared on the show to only last a few days or weeks, actually lasted 6–7 months, and the show's participants had to find their own transportation while their cars were being upgraded with no support from the network. In addition, the modifications made to the cars were often purely cosmetic and any problems with how the car ran were still up to the participants to fix. In an interview with HipHopDX, Xzibit explains about how he was the target of backlash on social media over his involvement in the show, even though he was merely the host and had no input in the actual vehicle modification.

== DVD releases ==
=== American version ===
| Title | Region 1 | Region 2 | DVD Extras |
|---|---|---|---|
| The Complete First Season | March 22, 2005 | February 6, 2006 | Deleted scenes; Bloopers; Exclusive Car Tour featuring Travis Barker of blink-182 and his 1954 Cadillac Coupe DeVille; West Coast Customs: "What We Drive" featurette; Xzibit's "What U See is What U Get" music video |
| The Complete Second Season | TBA | May 21, 2007 | N/A |

== International adaptations ==
Official adaptations of Pimp My Ride, produced or co-produced by international MTV affiliates, include:

=== For cars ===
- Pimp My Ride International (across Europe), a European version of the show where cars are pimped from all over Europe in the Netherlands at All Stoff. The show is hosted by American rappers Lil' Jon and Fat Joe.
- Pimp My Ride UK (United Kingdom, 2005-2007), presented by the DJ Tim Westwood. Carisma Automotive are the customizers for the British version.
- Pimp My Ride Baltic (2008).
- Pimp My Ride Brasil (Brazil, 2007-2008), presented by singer Jimmy London from the rock band Matanza.
- Pimp My Car (Indonesia), which aired on MTV Indonesia.
- Pimp My Ride France (France, 2009-2011), which aired on MTV France. The show was presented by Ramzy and had two seasons.

=== Others ===
- Pimp My Fahrrad (Germany), which aired on the German-language MTV Central. In the show, the Hamburg-based bike shop Junior's Club (referred to as "Elbcoast Psycles" on the show) redoes almost an entire bicycle ("fahrrad" being the German word for bicycle), usually leaving only the frame intact. While the show could be seen as a parody of the American original, it is also a loving tribute, using all the elements of the American show with a bicycle twist (Germany's safety guidelines are among the strictest in the world, and getting a road permit for thoroughly customized vehicles borders on the impossible. Similar rules apply in most of continental Europe). It is hosted by German actor Oliver Korittke.
- Pimp My Whatever (Germany). A spin-off of Pimp My Fahrrad in which ElbCoast Psychos return to "pimp" anything from a bathroom and a doghouse to a birthday party or even someone's brother. Pimp My Whatever is hosted by MTV presenter Patrice Bouédibéla. Both shows are located in Hamburg.
- Pimp My Wheels (Italy). Airing on MTV Italy, this show turns old rusty motorscooters or motorcycles into brand-new shiny vehicles. Hosted by the Italian hip-hop group Gemelli Diversi.
- Pimp My Room (The Netherlands) features some friendly competition between three students to see who will win the university student bedroom or apartment overhaul. Subsequently, the room is "pimped".
- Pimpa Meu Feed (Brazil). Airing on MTV Brazil social media, the show helps participants to boost their instagram, leverage the number of followers and get involved in this (much desired) life of influencer. It is hosted by Leo Picon and Ste Viegas.

== Legal action against business that used "Pimp My..." ==
Viacom, owner of the Pimp My Ride franchise, threatened legal action against a number of small businesses in 2006 over the use of the phrase Pimp My... in business names. Pimp My Snack, a recipe-sharing website, received one such warning letter and later renamed the business to Pimp That Snack. A British lawyer specializing in copyright concerns criticized the move, stating that trademark infringement cannot apply to companies that are providing different goods and services.

== See also ==
- Pimpmobile
- Overhaulin'
