= Honda Civic (fourth generation) =

Fourth generation of Honda Civic

Honda Civic Fourth generation
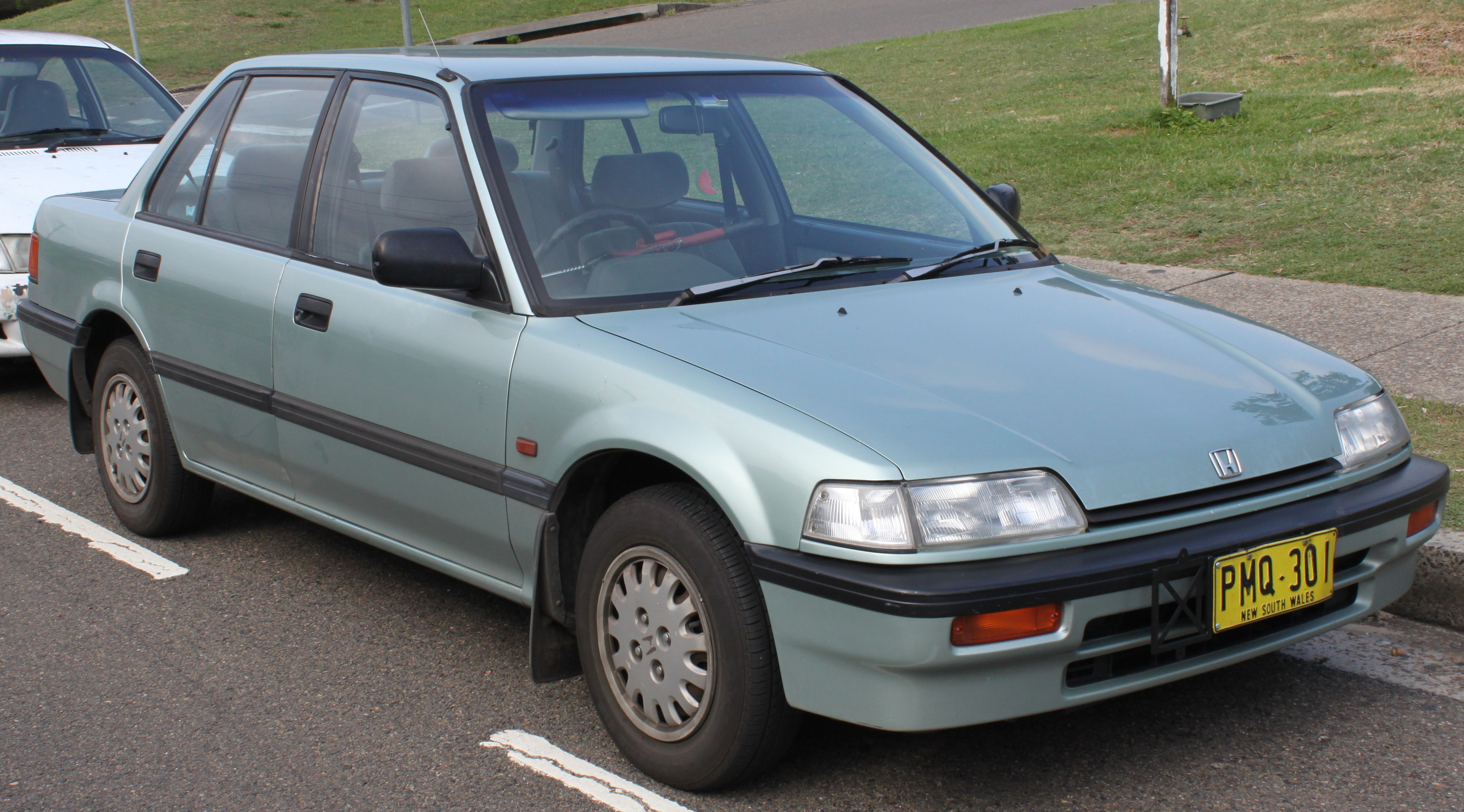

Overview
- Manufacturer: Honda
- Model code: EC; ED; EE; EF; EX
- Also called: Honda Ballade (South Africa); Honda Pro (JDM commercial van)
- Production: September 1987 – August 1991; September 1987 – February 1996 (Civic Shuttle)
- Model years: 1988–1991
- Assembly: Suzuka, Japan; East Liberty, Ohio, United States (East Liberty Auto Plant); Marysville, Ohio, United States (Marysville Auto Plant); Alliston, Ontario, Canada (HCM); Hsinchu, Taiwan; East London, South Africa (Mercedes-Benz South Africa); Nelson, New Zealand (Honda New Zealand); North Jakarta, Indonesia (PT. Prospect Motor); Santa Rosa, Laguna, Philippines (Honda Cars Philippines); Ayutthaya, Thailand; Johor Bahru, Malaysia (OASB)
- Designer: Humirou Yoshikawa, Tsuyoshi Nishimura, Syuhei Ueda (1984)

Body and chassis
- Class: Subcompact car
- Body style: 3-door hatchback (EC/EE); 4-door sedan (EF); 5-door station wagon (EE; Shuttle)
- Layout: Front-engine, front-wheel-drive / four-wheel-drive
- Related: Acura/Honda Integra; Honda Concerto; Honda City; Honda CR-X; Rover 200 (R8); Rover 400 (R8)

Powertrain
- Engine: 1.3 L D13B I4; 1.4 L D14A I4; 1.5 L D15B1 I4; 1.5 L D15B2 I4; 1.6 L D16A6 I4; 1.6 L ZC SOHC I4; 1.6 L D16A9 I4; 1.6 L B16A I4
- Transmission: 4/5-speed manual; 4-speed automatic

Dimensions
- Wheelbase: 2,500 mm (98.4 in)
- Length: 156.1 in (3,965 mm) (hatchback); 166.5 in (4,229 mm) (sedan); 161.7 in (4,107 mm) (wagon)
- Width: 65.6 in (1,666 mm) (hatchback); 65.9 in (1,674 mm) (sedan); 66.1 in (1,679 mm)
- Height: 52.4 in (1,331 mm) (hatchback); 53.5 in (1,359 mm) (sedan); 56.1 in (1,425 mm) (FWD Wagon); 56.9 in (1,445 mm) (4WD Wagon)

Chronology
- Predecessor: Honda Civic (third generation)
- Successor: Honda Civic (fifth generation); Honda Orthia (Shuttle); Honda CR-V (Shuttle Beagle 4WD)

The fourth-generation Honda Civic is a Japanese sub-compact automobile. It was produced by Honda from 1987 until 1991 with the wagon continuing in production in some markets until 1996. The suspension had a new double-wishbone suspension in the front and an independent suspension in the rear, the wheelbase was increased to 250 centimetres (98 in) from that of the third-generation Civic, and the body was redesigned with a lower hood line and more glass, resulting in less drag. The redesigned Civic was introduced in 1987 for the 1988 model year. The fourth-generation Civic would be available in three variants; 3-door hatchback, 4-door sedan and 5-door wagon with various trim levels offered in each variant.

== Japanese domestic market ==
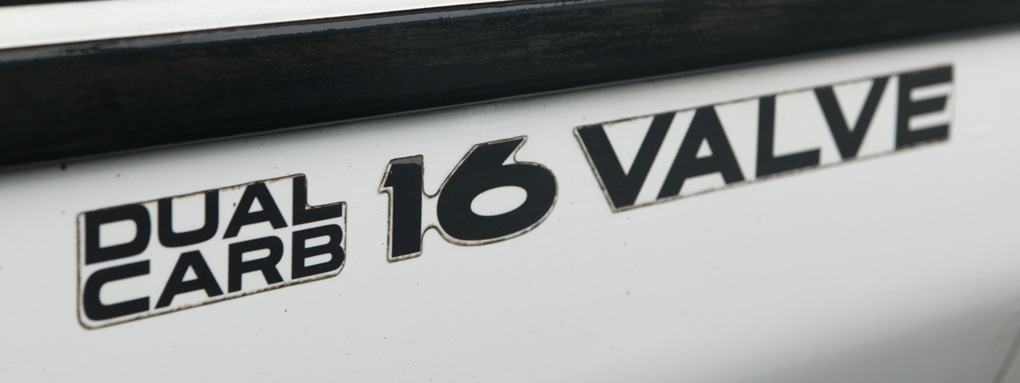
Honda Civic 25XT badge

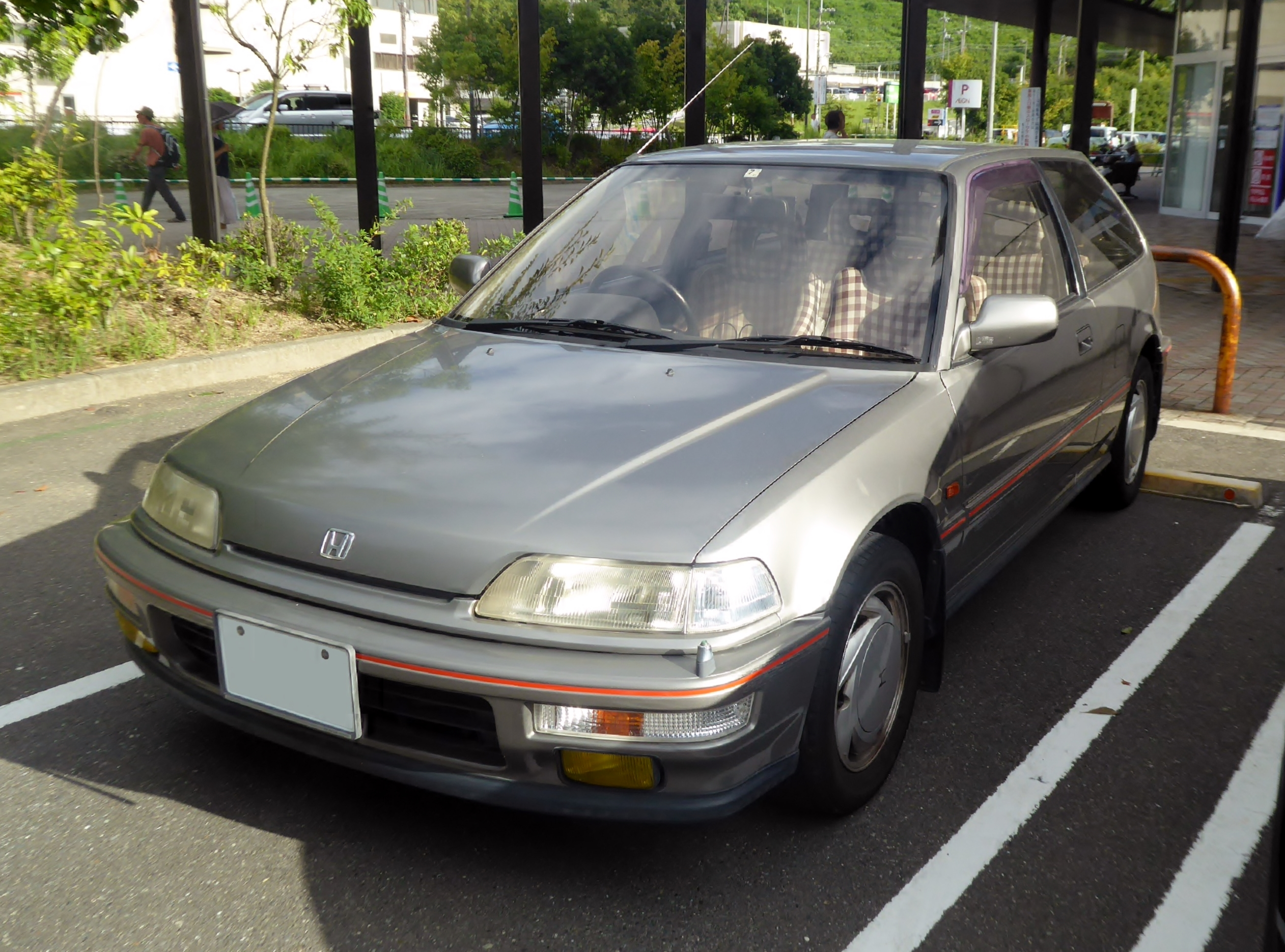
Civic SiR

In Japan, the base version received a 1.3 L SOHC single carbureted engine with 82 PS (60 kW), thus equipped it was called either 23L or 23U. This engine was also available in the commercial version of the Shuttle, sold as the "Honda Pro" initially.

The 1.5 L SOHC engine came in a variety of models, dual-point injection, single carbureted and dual carbureted. Those engines were available in the Japanese-market 25X and 25XT. The Si model featured a 1.6L DOHC 16-valve 4-cylinder (ZC) D16A8/A9 engine that produced 122 PS (90 kW; 120 hp).

In late 1989, a new trim package was added called the SiR which came equipped with a 1.6-litre DOHC VTEC 16-valve 4-cylinder B16A engine producing 160 PS (118 kW; 158 hp) at 7,600 rpm. This first B series engine, marked the introduction of Honda's variable valve timing and electronic lift control technology (VTEC). By providing two different camshaft profiles—one for fuel economy, one for performance, the VTEC engines set a high-revving, naturally aspirated precedent for future performance variants of the Honda Civic. The EF was originally designed for the ZC engine, not the B16A. This caused a front-to-rear weight imbalance, making the car front-heavy, this caused it to understeer. Further problems occurred with the driveshaft as the engine was mounted further forward to the ZC.

The European model, badged as a "1.6i-VT", used a slightly less powerful B16A1 engine, which had an 8,200 rpm redline and made 150 PS (110 kW), although it made the same 111 lbf⋅ft (150 N⋅m) of torque as the Japanese market B16. In Japan, automatic-equipped SiR Civics also received the lower-powered engine. The SiR was available only as a hatchback, with a distinct updated look. Among the visual changes, the SiR had a very distinct front end. It's easily identifiable by the hood with a raised, rather than lowered center, and turn signals that wrap around the front bumper.

=== Wagon/Shuttle/Pro ===
The wagon, known in Japan as the Civic Shuttle, continued to be built until February 21, 1996. The commercial-use model was called the "Honda Pro"; it was replaced by a dedicated commercial delivery van called the Honda Partner starting with model year 1996. The Shuttle was replaced by the Honda Orthia, a derivative of the Partner. The Orthia and Partner were sold only in Japan And Europe.

== North America ==
Honda Civic (ED) GL

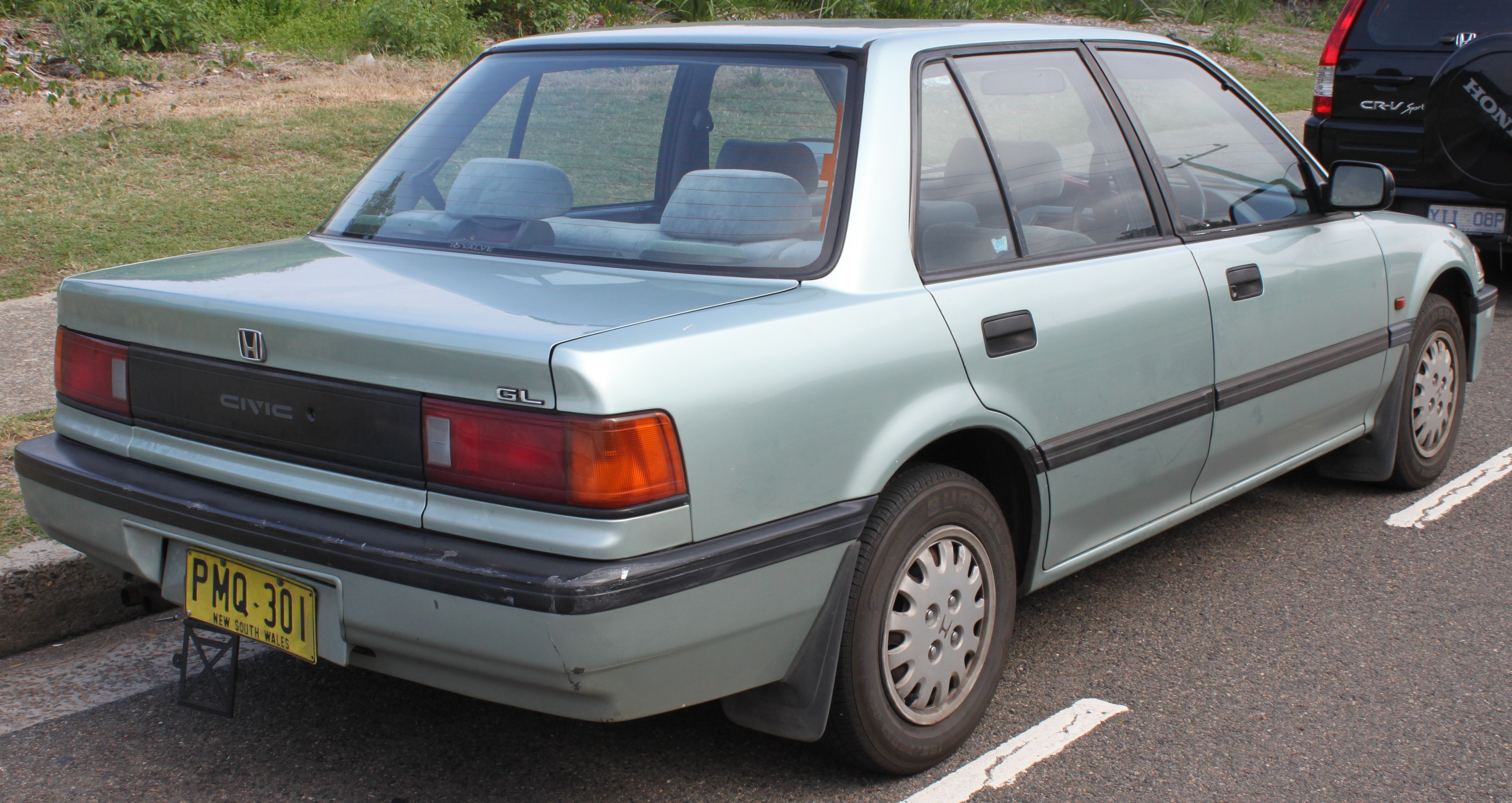
Sedan (pre-facelift)

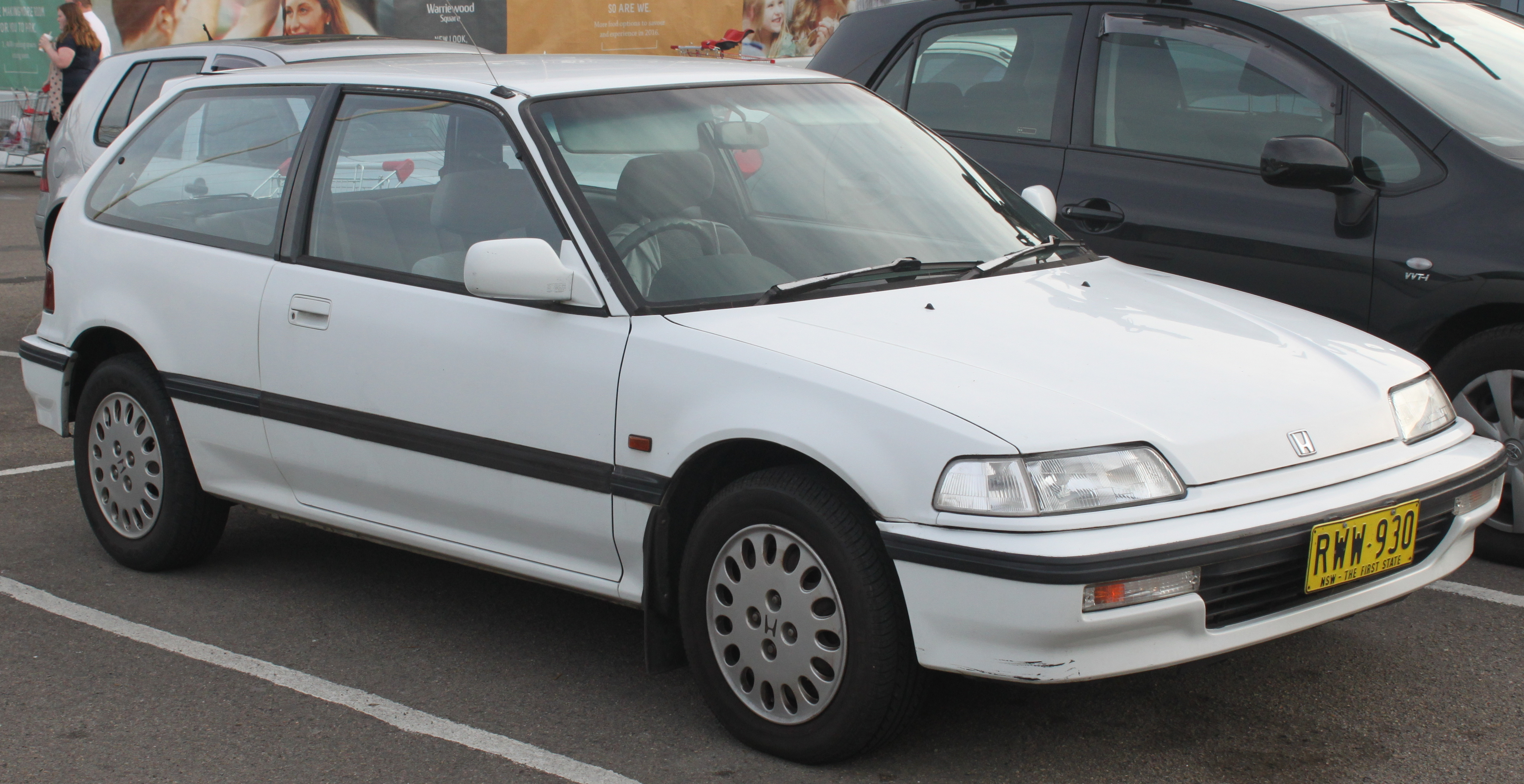
Hatchback (facelift)

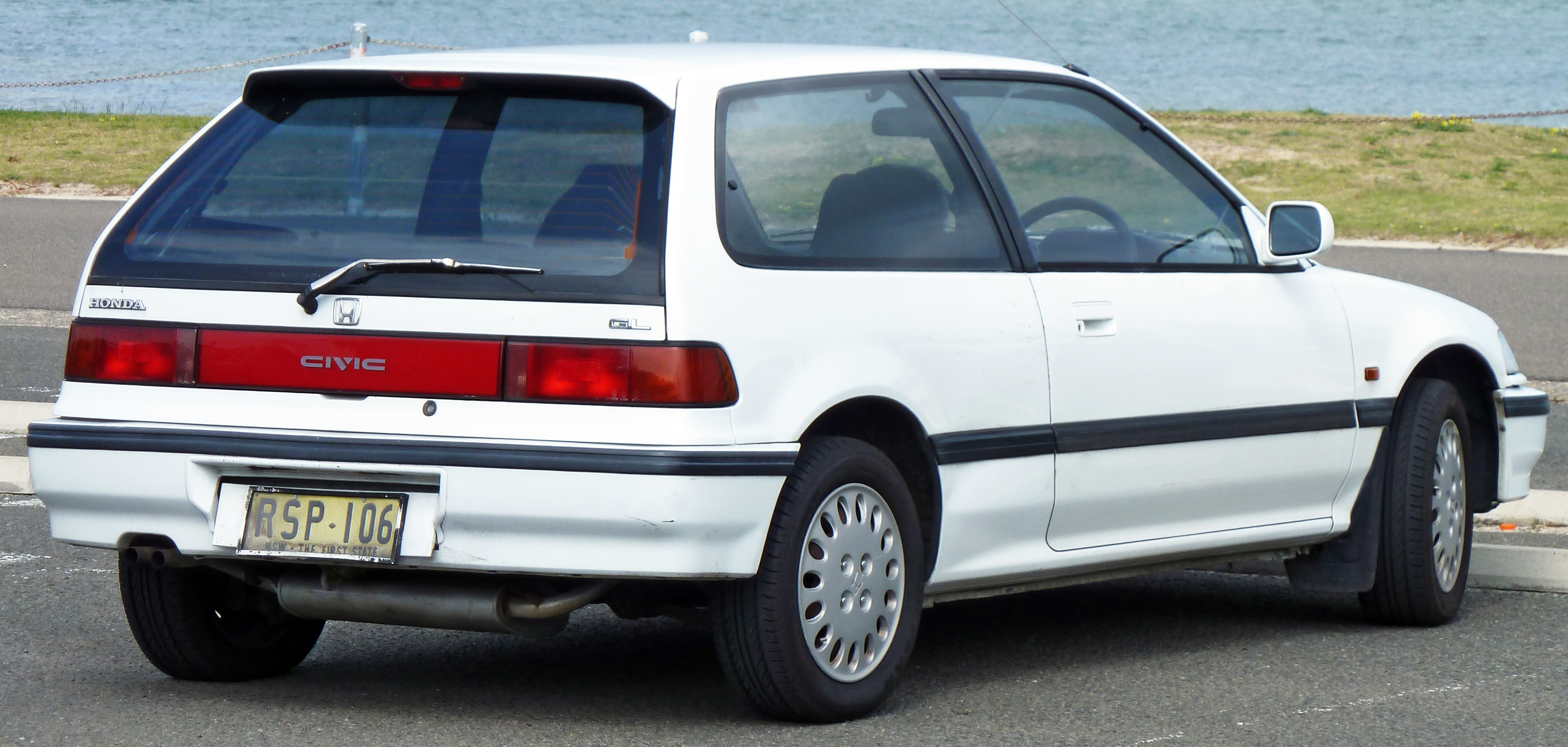
Hatchback (facelift)

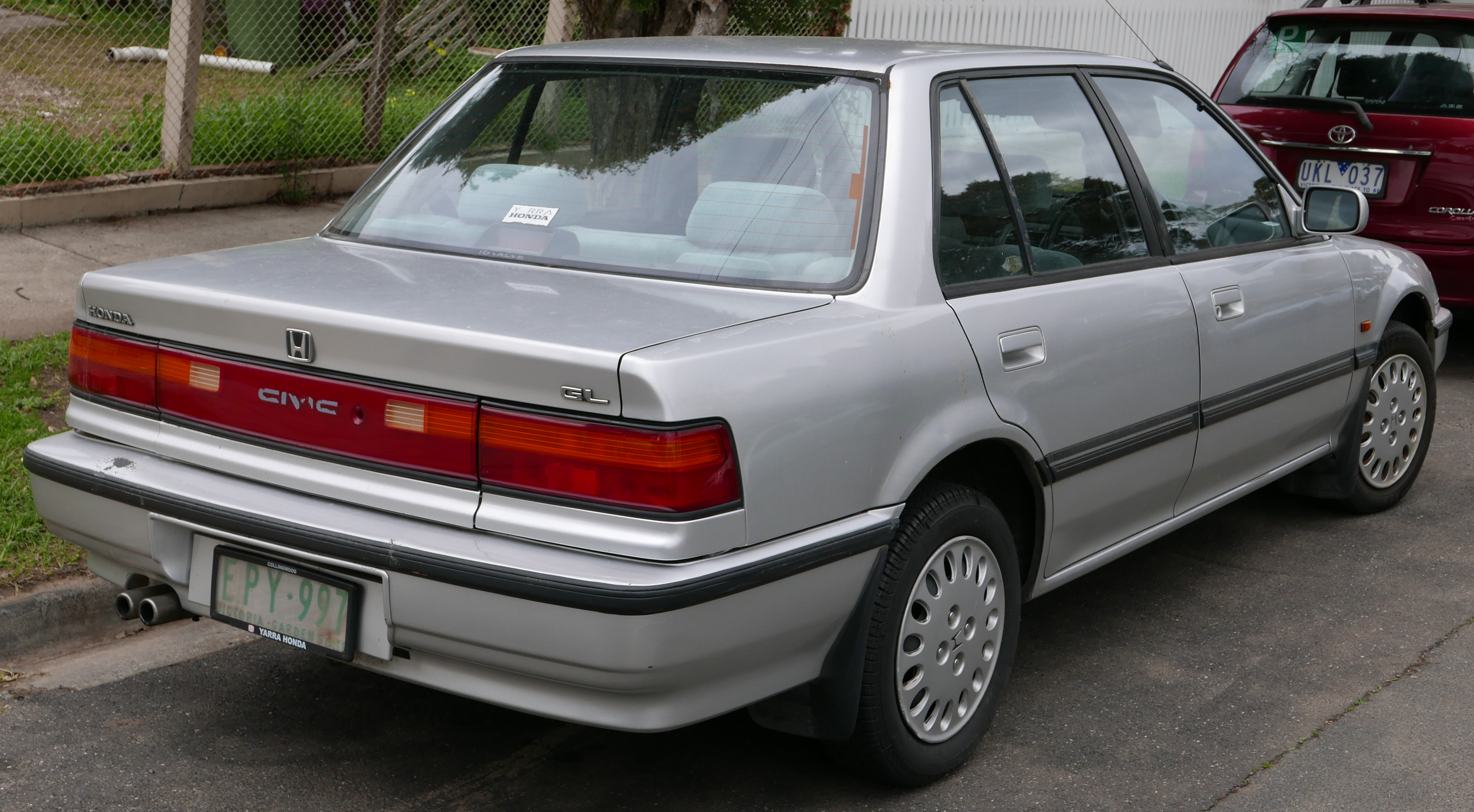
Sedan (facelift)

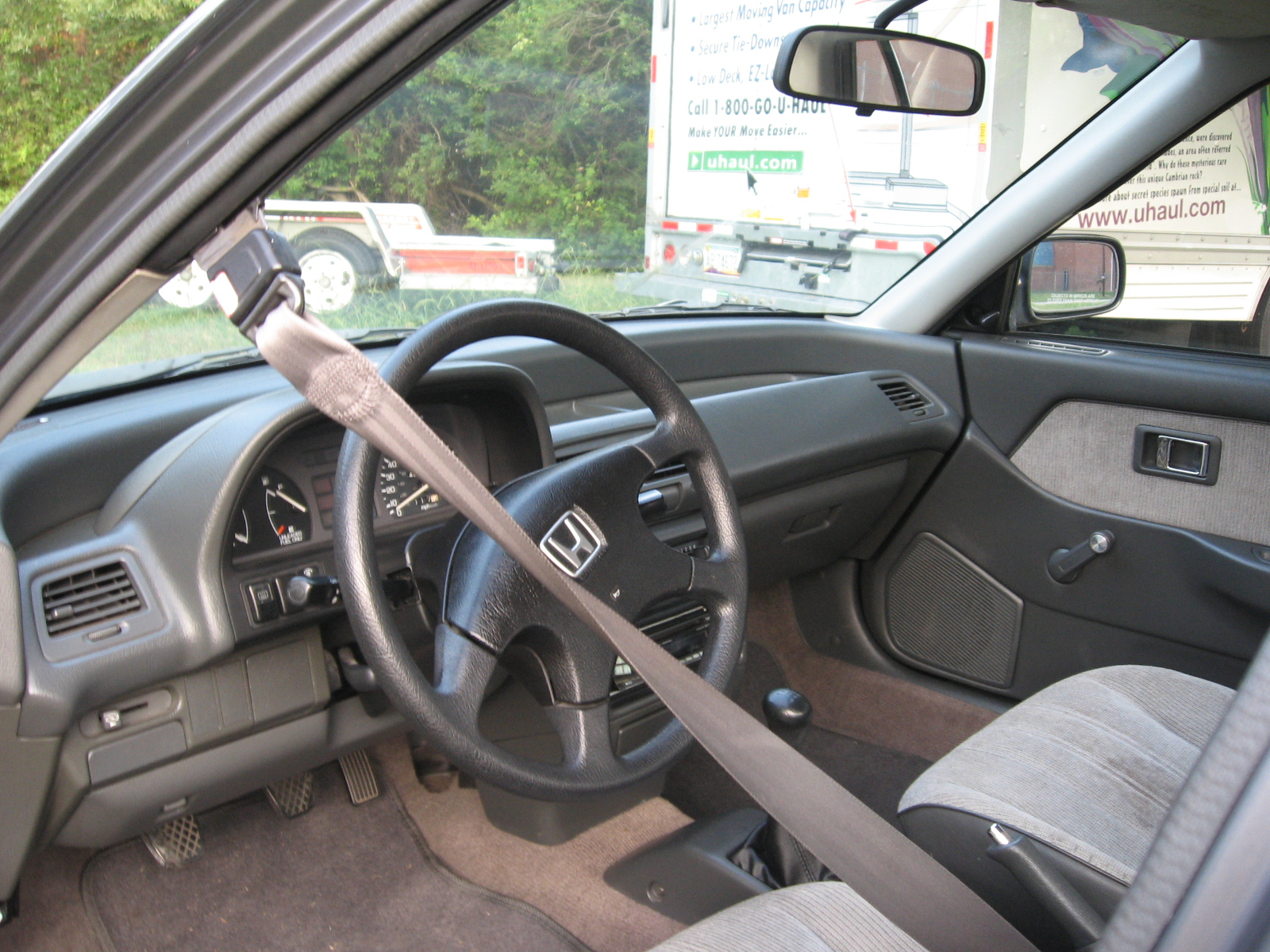
Interior of the DX

The fourth-generation Civic was introduced for the 1988 model year. Unlike Civics sold in other markets, all North American Civics were fuel injected. The fourth-generation Civic offered larger dimensions than the previous Civic. Initially, the Si model was not available. All fourth-generation Civics have true all independent suspension and power steering is standard on all LX sedans and 4WD wagons and included on some other models when equipped with an automatic transmission. Few changes were introduced in 1989 with the exception of the return of the Si model.

In 1990, the Civic received a minor refresh which included a redesigned front bumper, a revised shaped gauge cluster, updated tail lights and thinner side moldings. Civic sedans and wagons received automatic seat belts as well. The sedan and wagon featured powered automatic shoulder belts that retracted from the B-pillar to a position halfway down the A-pillar when the door was open, while the hatchback received a standard style shoulder and lap belt mechanism that was attached to the door and was intended to remain buckled at all times. The Canadian models continued to use manual front seat belts.

Only minor changes were introduced in 1991 such as full wheel covers and body-colored bumpers on the DX hatchbacks and the Si side mirrors were now body-colored (instead of black). 1991 would be the final year for the fourth-generation Civic.

=== CX/STD ===
Known as the CX in Canada, the base model, only available as a hatchback, came equipped with minimal standard equipment. It came with a 1.5-liter SOHC 16-valve four-cylinder D15B1 engine, producing 70 hp (52.2 kW). The standard equipped transmission was a 4-speed manual while a 4-speed automatic transmission was optional. The CX came without a rear wiper, black front and rear bumpers, less interior pieces, and a black rear centerpiece between the taillights.

=== DX ===
The DX was available as either a sedan or hatchback. The DX sedan and hatchback came with non-color matching bumper covers. Seats were cloth in all DX Civics. All DX Civics featured a 1.5-liter SOHC 16-valve 4-cylinder D15B2 engine producing 75–92 bhp (56–69 kW; 76–93 PS) and came standard with a 4-speed manual transmission. A 4-speed automatic was optional.

=== LX ===
Available only as a sedan, the LX had an upgraded interior with tachometer instrumentation, electric windows and door locks, electric door mirrors, cruise control, clock, and wheel covers as standard equipment, as well as body-colored bumpers. The LX Civic was equipped with a 1.5 litre SOHC 16-valve D15B2 engine producing 75–92 bhp (56–69 kW; 76–93 PS) with a 5-speed manual transmission. A 4-speed automatic transmission was optional.

=== EX ===
Beginning in 1990, and available only as a sedan. It includes all LX standard features as well as the more powerful 1.6-litre SOHC 16-valve D16A6 engine, making 108 bhp (81 kW; 109 PS) and 100 lb⋅ft (136 N⋅m) of torque. It also featured an upgraded interior and 175/65/HR14 tires as well as upgraded front brakes with 10.3-inch disc brakes vs. the 9.5-inch on the STD, DX, LX and Si models.

=== Si ===
The Civic Si hatchback returned for the 1989 model year. The Si was only available as a hatchback with a 5-speed manual transmission, which featured shorter gears than lower models. The Si came with a 1.6-liter SOHC 16-valve 4-cylinder D16A6 engine, producing the same 108 bhp (81 kW; 109 PS) as in the EX. The Civic Si weighed 2,286 lb (1,037 kg), achieving a factory 0–60 mph of 8.1 seconds; and a quarter-mile time of 16.2 at 82 mph (132 km/h).

The Si model adds features such as a power sunroof/moonroof, tachometer, dual manual side mirrors, an upgraded interior, color-matched bumpers, dashboard clock, larger exhaust, front and rear anti-roll bars and 14-inch steel wheels with covers mounted with 185/60/R14 tires. There was no power steering and no automatic transmission available (except in Canada). Additional dealer-installed options were air conditioning and fog lights as well as other Honda accessories such as wheels, nose masks, and audio components.

=== Wagon ===
The wagon was available as FWD or RealTime4WD. The 4WD wagon featured the same engine found in the Si hatchback; a 1.6 liter SOHC 16-valve 4-cylinder D16A6 engine producing 105 hp (78 kW) (Note: Horsepower increased to 108HP in 1989) paired with either a 5-speed manual transmission (with a super-low gear left of first) or a 4-speed automatic transmission. The FWD versions received a 1.5-liter SOHC 16-valve D15B2 engine producing 92 bhp (69 kW; 93 PS), paired with a 5-speed manual or 4-speed automatic transmission. 4WD wagons had white steel wheels with matching center caps.

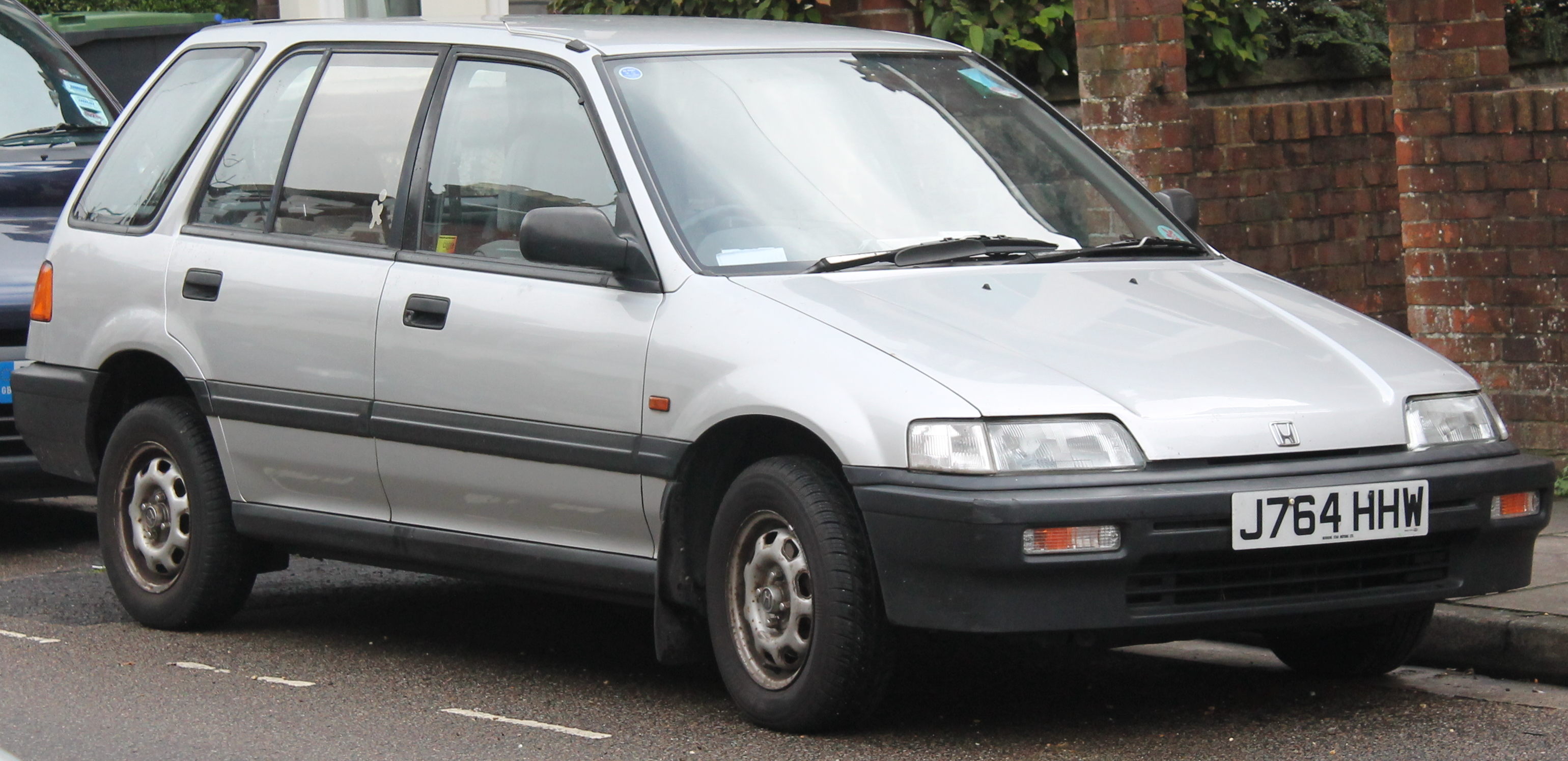
1992 Honda Civic Shuttle GL 1.4 (UK)

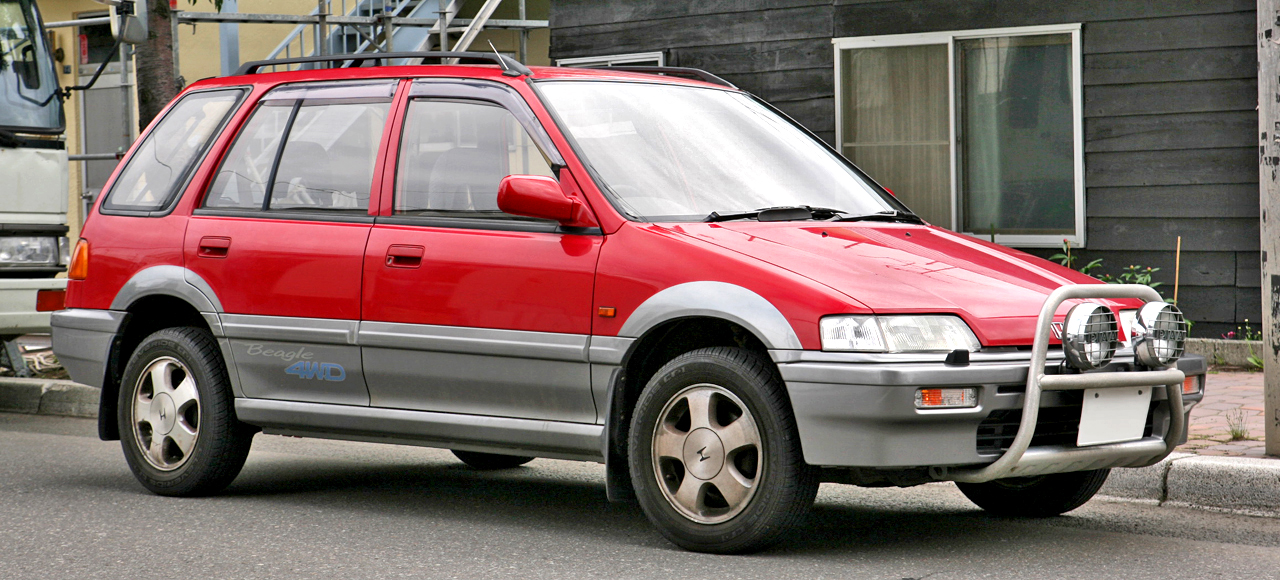
Honda Civic Shuttle Beagle (Japan)

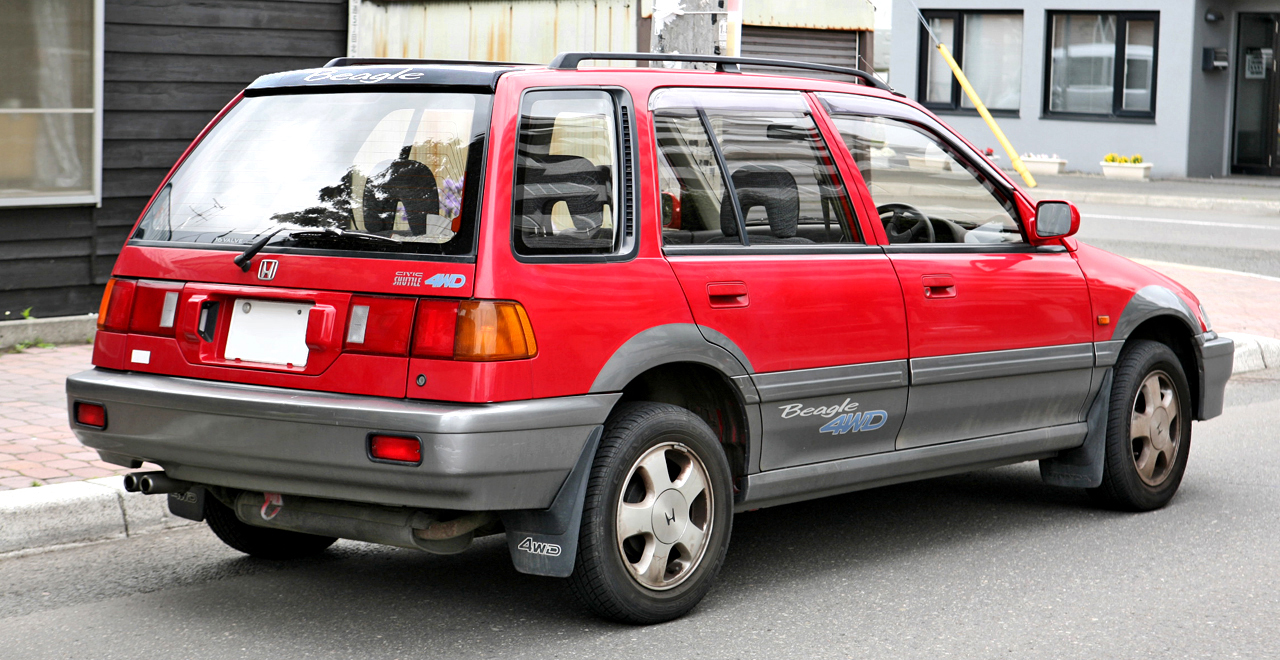
Honda Civic Shuttle Beagle (Japan)

=== North American curb weights ===
	Standard Hatch		DX Hatch		Si Hatch	DX Sedan		LX Sedan		EX Sedan		2WD Wagon		4WD Wagon	
	Auto	Manual	Auto	Manual	Manual	Auto	Manual	Auto	Manual	Auto	Manual	Auto	Manual	Auto	Manual
1988	-	1,933 lb (877 kg)	-	1,933 lb (877 kg)	n/a	-	2,039 lb (925 kg)	-	2,138 lb (970 kg)	n/a	n/a	-	2,130 lb (966 kg)	-	2,366 lb (1,073 kg)
1989	-	2,013 lb (913 kg)	2,138 lb (970 kg)	2,088 lb (947 kg)	2,161 lb (980 kg)	2,209 lb (1,002 kg)	2,147 lb (974 kg)	2,249 lb (1,020 kg)	2,211 lb (1,003 kg)	n/a	n/a	-	2,130 lb (966 kg)	-	2,366 lb (1,073 kg)
1990-1991	1,996 lb (905 kg)	2,127 lb (965 kg)	-	2,165 lb (982 kg)	2,291 lb (1,039 kg)	2,252 lb (1,021 kg)	2,262 lb (1,026 kg)	-	2,322 lb (1,053 kg)	-	2,374 lb (1,077 kg)	-	2,335 lb (1,059 kg)	-	2,628 lb (1,192 kg)

Air Conditioning added 49 lb (22 kg). Cargo capacity was an additional 100 lb (45 kg) hatchback, 75 lb (34 kg) sedan.

== European market ==
For most of Europe, the base model came equipped with a 1.3 L 4-cylinder engine. Next was a 1.4 L SOHC 4-cylinder dual-carbureted engine with 90 PS (66 kW; 89 bhp) which was available from 1988 until 1991, followed by the fuel injected 1.5i GL and GLX models.

In the United Kingdom, the sedan was initially not available although it had been offered in many continental European markets since the introduction. With a resurgence in sales of saloons, it was introduced in early 1990, and then only as a carburetted 1.4 GL. The 1.5 and 1.6 saloons were not sold in the UK, to avoid cannibalizing sales of the soon-to-be-released Concerto saloon.

The sporting European 1.6i GT and 1.6i-16 (depends on country) had a 1.6 L DOHC four-cylinder engine and produced 124 PS (91 kW; 122 hp) (D16Z5) or 130 PS (96 kW; 128 hp) (D16A9). In Europe, the SiR was called 1.6i-VT and had a similar 1.6-liter DOHC VTEC (B16A1) 4-cylinder engine.

== South African market ==
In South Africa, the fourth-generation Civic was sold under the Honda Ballade branding.

== Awards ==
The fourth-generation Honda Civic was included in Car and Driver's 10Best for all four years (1988-1991).

The car was well-received globally, receiving “Golden Steering Wheel Award” from the German newspaper Bild am Sonntag, and ranking first in France’s l’Automobile magazine 1989 survey on car quality and reliability.

== Motorsports ==
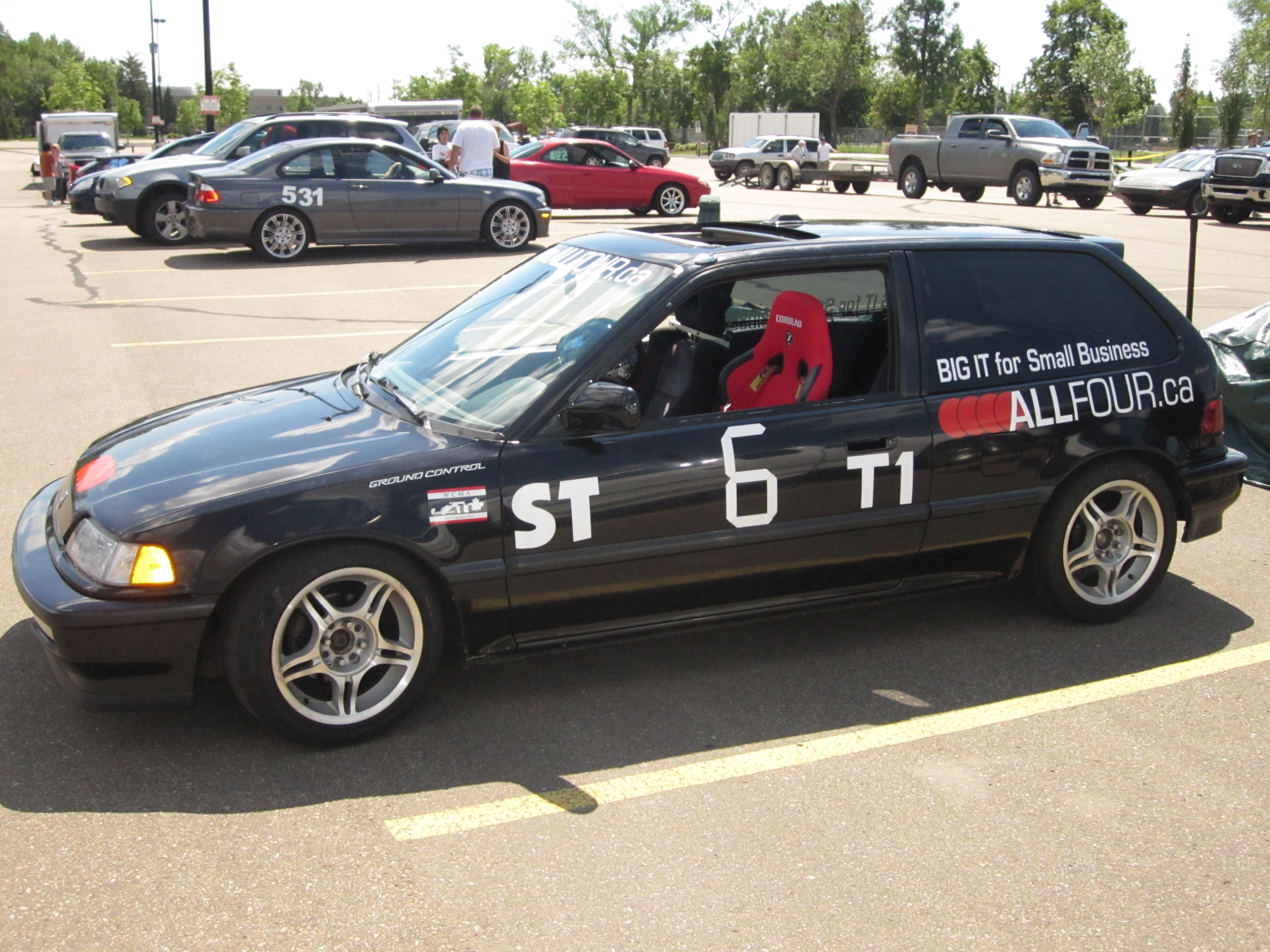
1990 Autocross Civic Si Hatchback

Despite its image as an economical vehicle, the fourth-generation hatchback became popular in near stock SCCA autocross competition. The ED chassis dominated the Street touring category, competing against the Mazda MX-5 Miata. Fourth-generation Civic hatchbacks became popular among Honda Civic enthusiasts due to their lightweight design and formidable suspension layout.

Due to the difference in engine output and modification potential between the American and JDM models, the fourth-generation Civic Si (Note: along with the second generation Honda CR-X) sparked a popular trend of engine swapping, where tuners would replace the Honda D-series power plant with a more powerful Honda DOHC B-series motor.

In Japanese Touring Car Championship, other than issues with understeering as the car was originally designed for the ZC engine, the VTEC system had to be deactivated in earlier seasons due to issues with reliability but was reactivated once those issues was resolved, helping to win three of races in 1990 and 1991. It failed to clinch the driver's title in 1990 but continued to hold on to the manufacturer's title since 1987.
