= Bruce Beresford-Redman =

American television producer

- Born: April 20, 1971
- Occupation: Television producer

Bruce Beresford-Redman (born April 20, 1971) is an American television producer known for his role in Pimp My Ride and Survivor. In 2015, he was convicted in Mexico of the murder of his wife, Mônica.

== Early life ==
The son of David and Juanita Beresford-Redman, he grew up in Woodcliff Lake, New Jersey, and attended Pascack Hills High School with Pimp My Ride co-creator Rick Hurvitz. He graduated from New College of Florida in Sarasota, Florida.

== Career ==
Beresford-Redman was a reality TV producer and a producer of the television franchise Survivor. He was also involved in producing Pimp My Ride, a popular car makeover show on MTV.

His career has since been eclipsed by an investigation surrounding his asserted involvement in his wife's death early in 2010, when the naked body of his wife was found near their hotel while they and their children were holidaying in Mexico.

== Personal life ==
Beresford-Redman married a Brazilian national, Mônica Burgos, on April 8, 1999, in Rio de Janeiro; the couple had two children, who now live with their paternal grandparents.

=== Murder of Mônica ===
On April 8, 2010, Beresford-Redman's wife Mônica was found dead while they were on holiday in Cancún, Mexico. She had been strangled and her body dumped in a sewer near the Moon Palace resort where the family had been staying.

Later on the day of the murder, Beresford-Redman was detained and questioned by police as a person of interest in his wife's death. He was released by police during the early morning hours of April 8 on condition that he should not leave Mexico while the investigation into his wife's death remained ongoing.

Two young British tourists staying at the hotel reported that they heard the couple arguing in their room on April 4. Beresford-Redman was also reportedly seen with scratches on his hands and the back of his neck.

Mônica's cause of death was determined to be asphyxiation. Since his passport had been retained by the Mexican authorities when he was arrested, Beresford-Redman illegally left Mexico by crossing the border using his driver's licence as identification and taking a train to Los Angeles.

On May 31, 2010, Mexico issued an arrest warrant for Beresford-Redman in connection with the murder of his wife while prosecutors initiated extradition proceedings to return him to Mexico for trial.

=== Arrest ===
On November 16, 2010, CNN reported that Beresford-Redman had been arrested by US marshals in Los Angeles using a warrant from Mexico. On November 29, 2010, a Los Angeles federal judge denied his request for bail.

=== Extradition ===
On July 12, 2011, US magistrate Jacqueline Chooljian determined that Beresford-Redman should be sent to Mexico because there was enough circumstantial evidence to show probable cause that he might have murdered his wife. US prosecutors had reviewed the case made by Mexican authorities and deemed sufficient evidence to show possible motives for him to have killed his wife including: collecting insurance money; getting sole custody of their children; and continuing an extramarital affair.

Beresford-Redman waived further appeals and was extradited to Mexico on February 8, 2012. A judge found sufficient evidence that Beresford-Redman murdered his wife and on February 15, 2012, ordered that he remain in custody pending adjudication.

=== Conviction ===
On March 12, 2015, Beresford-Redman was convicted of murdering his wife, and sentenced to 12 years in prison by Judge Víctor Manuel Echeverría Tun. Beresford-Redman has appealed. The prosecution considered the sentence to be unduly lenient, and left open the possibility of also appealing.

From November 2014 Beresford-Redman was incarcerated in a jail in Cancún before and after sentencing. Other witnesses either did not appear or supported the defense.

In a video diary made during his incarceration Beresford-Redman had claimed that much of the evidence against him was reportedly contaminated in police custody, and minute amounts of blood in the hotel room where the family stayed did not belong to Mônica Beresford-Redman per DNA testing.

As of September 2015, he had not seen his children in almost four years.

=== Release ===
He was released from prison in September 2019 after serving 7 1/2 years out of 12.

== Media ==
The then ongoing investigation of Beresford-Redman by the Mexican authorities was covered in an episode of the television series 48 Hours titled "Fatal Episode: The Producer's Story" (Season 25, Episode 17).
