= Hoovie's Garage =

YouTube automotive channel

- Born: Tyler Hoover; Kansas
- Occupation: YouTuber

YouTube information
- Channel: Hoovies Garage
- Years active: 2016–present
- Genres: Cars and Trucks
- Subscribers: 1.65 million
- Views: 530 million
- Last updated: May 23, 2026

Hoovie's Garage is a YouTube channel featuring videos about cars and trucks, hosted by Tyler Hoover.

Hoover is known for purchasing cars he refers to as "hoopties," typically originally high-priced sports cars that have heavily depreciated and vintage luxury vehicles in questionable operational condition — then repairing, demonstrating, and eventually selling the vehicles. Local mechanic David Long, called the "Car Wizard" by Hoover, would often take care of the repairs. In 2019, Hoover presented the show "Car Issues" for Motor Trend on Demand.

Hoover often jokingly refers to his channel as "The dumbest automotive channel in all of YouTube" at the start of videos.

== Background ==
Hoover attended and graduated from Andover High School and Wichita State University. After college he held multiple jobs in the used car industry, starting and operating his own dealership for a short time before working at his father's Freddy's Frozen Custard & Steakburgers fast food franchise locations. Hoover worked as an Opening Coordinator & Operations Support specialist for the fast-food chain before committing to his YouTube and automotive-personality career.
