= Meu Funeral =

Brazilian punk rock band

- Origin: Niterói, Rio de Janeiro, Brazil
- Genres: Punk rock, Hardcore punk, Pop punk
- Years active: 2018–present
- Labels: Marã Música; Universal Music
- Members: Luquita; Pepe; Dan; Pedro "Tent" Tentilhão
- Past members: Jan Santoro; Matheus Jorell; Peep

Meu Funeral is a Brazilian punk rock band from Niterói, Rio de Janeiro. Formed in 2018 by vocalist Lucas "Luquita" Araujo, they went through a number of member changes until 2020, when the current line-up was established with guitarist Pepe, bassist Dan Menezes and drummer Pedro "Tent" Tentilhão.

The band is known for its incorporation of diverse genres into their punk sound, which includes collaborations with names not usually connected to rock, such as funk carioca singer Tati Quebra Barraco and samba singer Xande de Pilares.

== History ==
=== Formation and origin of the name (2018) ===
In interviews to the website Keeping Track and the Brazilian edition of Rolling Stone magazine, vocalist Lucas "Luquita" Araujo explained that he started to conceive the band in 2018 in Niterói in a period in which he was looking for new works after a hostel that he opened went bankrupt. His friend Felipe Vellozo (ex-Mahmundi, Duda Beat) lent him a recording studio and Luquita started searching for a guitarist, inviting Pepe eventually. By the end of 2018, bassist Dan Menezes joined them.

The band debuted on stage still in that year, with one source alluding to a show in April with El Efecto at UFF and another mentioning a show in July with a line-up consisting of Lucas Araujo (ex-RivoTrio 2mg), Jan Santoro (Facção Caipira), Matheus Jorell (Filhos do Totem/ex-Lougo Mouro) and Peep (ex-Clashing Clouds).

Their name is inspired by a song from their early catalogue, and the group adopted it for being "a little aggressive and at the same time funny", although some people initially took them for a black metal act. They also saw the name as an opportunity for a more lighthearted approach to death.

=== Early releases and deal with Universal Music (2018–2021) ===
During their first years, Meu Funeral released a number of singles, EPs and one demo. The first ones came in 2018, including the song that named them and one dmeo titled Demo. By the end of 2019, they released the EP Tira-Gosto ("appetizer"), promoted by the single "Queimando a Mufa", which was mastered by Joe LaPorta (David Bowie, Foo Fighters, Against Me!). In 2020, they released the EP Canções de Ninar para o Apocalipse ("Lullabies for the Apocalypse"). Also in 2020, in January, they shared the stage with Rats and Raimundos at Circo Voador.

In February 2021, they signed up with Universal Music and released, on the 4th, the song "Acabou (Você Não É Mais Presidente)" (It's Over (You're No Longer President"), which criticised the then ruling government of Brazil (generating comparisons with "Tô Feliz (Matei o Presidente)", by rapper Gabriel o Pensador) and was accompanied by a clip released soon after. The video featured over 70 special guests, including Jimmy London (Matanza Ritual, ex-Matanza), Vicente Coelho (Biltre), Natalia Carrera (Letrux), Tomas Rosati (El Efecto), Chico Brown and Gabriel Zander.

"Acabou (Você Não É Mais Presidente)" was part of the EPs Acorda! Vem Ver o Apocalipse ("Wake Up! Come See the Apocalypse") and Acabou ("It's Over"), the latter released on the 5th and promoted by a video for the single "Queimando a Mufa". The EP cover art was signed by artist Malfeitona.

Originally, the project was intended to compose something bigger called Tropicore Hardcal, which would contain 13–14 tracks. This ended up becoming a separate EP released on 13 May 2022 by Universal, with four tracks, including the one that inspired the band's name. This song was supposed to be released in 2021, but the group left it aside because they didn't think it would be appropriate to release something with that tile amidst the COVID-19 pandemic. Another track from the release, "Ela Não Ama Você" ("She Doesn't Love You"), features Letícia Pires (A Creche). The name of the EP is inspired by the typical word plays by American band NOFX, one of their influences.

=== Arrival of Pedro "Tent" Tentilhão and Modo Fufu (2021–2022) ===
On 9 April 2021, they released the song "Fufu TV", which was part of a comic campaign by the band trying to promote themselves as a "web band" of influencers. The project was an alternative found by the band to remain active during the limitations brought by the COVID-19 pandemic. On 22 August 2021, now with drummer Pedro Tentilhão, they released their debut album, Modo Fufu, containing eight songs and promoted by the single "94". The song release was accompanied by posts making references to the year that names the song and covers of songs released in that year, such as "Assim Caminha a Humanidade", by Lulu Santos; "Hakuna matata", off The Lion King soundtrack; and "Essa Tal Liberdade", by Só Pra Contrariar. "94" tells the story of a couple compared to the duo Bebeto and Romário, who were a highlight in the Brazilian national football team back then.

One of the album promotional videos showed its artwork creative process, the cover inspired by the cover of "Modo Turbo" ("Turbo Mode"), a single by Luísa Sonza, Pabllo Vittar and Anitta. A live version of the album, Modo Fufu ao Vivo, was released soon after, on 27 September.

On 13 July of the same year, which is World Rock Day in Brazil, they released the song "Dançar" ("To Dance"), featuring funk carioca singer Tati Quebra Barraco. The idea of inviting her to perform came from the song's very title; she was offered the opportunity to bring a beat of her own but chose to sing over a rock instrumental.

On 20 September 2022, they released a new version of "Meu Funeral" featuring Comunidade Nin-Jitsu and with a lyric video created in a South Park style and directed by Vitor Zorzetti.

=== RIO (2023–2024) ===
They released the EP Coisa de Satanás ("Satan Thing") em 2 de abril de 2023, a date which was picked to coincide with Good Friday.

In the same year came the album RIO, produced by Los Brasileros and featuring the singles "Essa é Pra Transar Chorando" ("This One Is to Have Sex Crying"), featuring samba singer Xande de Pilares (whose song "Clareou" was covered by them during the pandemic); and "Inimigos do Fim" ("Enemies of the End"; a Brazilian slang for people who can't stop partying), featuring Jimmy London singing a funk carioca beat. The album also features Priscila Tossan and Rodrigo Lima. The songs were composed during the Modo Fufu and Tropicore Hardcal EPs tours and see the band exploring more genres besides rock, including funk, pagode and piseiro (a variation of pisadinha).

In May 2024, they released the live EP Rock Together Sessions (Ao Vivo).

In September, they released the single "Cesar e Ana", which pays tribute to a couple of friends called Flávia and Thiago, who went on a journey by motorhome; the song "celebrates both this couple and all people who are brave enough to transform their lives in search of new possibilities". The name of the couple was changed to be more generic and also to create a pun with the caesarean procedure (which sounds like "Cesar and Ana" in Portuguese).

In October, they participated in the Blind Pigs tribute album Tributo 30 anos, alongside CPM 22, Rats and Supla. On 30 November 2024, they supported John Wayne at SESC Belenzinho in São Paulo.

=== Empacotado (2025–present) ===
In September 2025, they recorded a special DVD celebrating their 7th anniversary at the Belvedere bar in Curitiba. In that year, they also released the EP O Que Sobrou do Rio ("What's Left of Rio"), an effort meant to close their RIO era and promoted by the single "A Fragilidade de Ser um Machão" ("The Fragility of Being a Macho Man"), which features the rock band The Mönic and had a video shot at Casa de Cultura Butantã, in São Paulo, directed by Raul Ibanez. The video follows the band in a typical 1960s ball which ends up in chaos. The album songs were written during the RIO sessions, however, they were "strategically" left out for a future release.

Precisely at 12:12 pm on 12 June 2025, Valentine's Day in Brazil, Meu Funeral released the single "Se Eu Morrer de Saudade" ("If I Miss You to Death"), which speaks about love, relationships and saudades, drawing inspiration from relationships by most of the member, who at the time were dating people from other states. The song combines an over ten-year-old riff with more recent ideas and came with a video inspired by the video of "These Days" by Foo Fighters, with footage of the band on the road, so as to match the topic of saudade.

On 14 July 2025, came "Deus Está no Comando" ("God Is in Charge") (the first song they ever played live, back in 2018), featuring the New York City band Bayside Kings, via Marã Música. The lyrics criticise the exploitation of people by churches. On 5 September, they released another single, "Tudo Que Eu Queria" ("Everything I Wanted"), this time featuring Duda Beat and covering the hatred one feels for another, as well as the rejoicing in seeing that person getting out of luck.

The three singles were later featured in their third album, Empacotado ("Packed"), released on 19 September via Marã Música. Another single was released to promote the effort, "Velho Pra Sempre" ("Forever Old"), whose video, featuring slow images that contrast with the fast-paced rhythm of the song, is inspired by the video of "Good Riddance" by Green Day.

In November 2025, they oerformed at the Tente Não Clicar festival, alongside Melton Sello, Mastrobiso, Juvi and Bruninho MP3.

== Musisal style and lyrical themes ==
Meu Funeral is considered a punk rock/pop punk band, and they mix elements from several other genres, including non-rock styles, such as funk carioca. They are collectively influenced by NOFX, Blink-182, Green Day, The Offspring, Charlie Brown Jr., New Kids on the Block, Ratos de Porão and Mukeka di Rato, and individually by Barões da Pisadinha (Pedro Tent), Kevin O Chris (Luquita), The Beatles (Pepe) and Foo Fighters (Dan). They also cite the 1990s in general as an influence.

In an interview to Billboard Brasil, Luquita commented that the mix of genres promoted by the band may be a consequence of their hometown, since in Rio de Janeiro things can be "a little chaotic and mixed".

In another interview, this time to the Brazilian edition of Rolling Stone magazine in 2021, he commented that the term "punk" is more about the attitude than the music itself, citing Pabllo Vittar as an example of someone "more punk" than them. They usually take on the stage under "I Gotta Feeling", by the Black Eyed Peas.

When asked if the lyrics with social criticisms, as well as the inspiration behind them, drummer Tent said "this criticism in the lyrics were never an aesthetic objective by the band in itself, they are topics we cover in music and in life, too. The punk/HC movement, one of our greatest musical influences, always sought to stand politically, its part of our artistic movement."

== Members ==
=== Current ===
- Lucas "Luquita" Araújo – vocals, guitar, acoustic guitar, ukulele (2018–present)
- Pepe – guitar, backing vocals (2018–present)
- Dan Menezes – bass, backing vocals (2018–present)
- Pedro "Tent" Tentilhão – drums (2020–present)

=== Former ===
- Jan Santoro
- Matheus Jorell (2018)
- Peep (2018)

== Discography ==
=== Demo ===
- Demo (2018)

=== EPs ===
- Canções de Ninar para o Apocalipse (2020)
- Acabou (2021)
- Tropicore Hardcal (2022)
- Rock Together Sessions (Ao Vivo) (2024)
- O Que Sobrou do Rio (2025)
- Coisa de Satanás (2023)

=== Studio albums ===
- Modo Fufu (2021)
- RIO (2023)
- Empacotado (2025)

=== Live albums ===
- Modo Fufu ao Vivo (2021)

=== Singles ===
- "Queimando a Mufa" (2019)
- "Acabou (Você Não é Mais Presidente)" (2021)
- "Queimando a Mufa" (2021)
- "94" (2021)
- "Fufu TV" (2021)
- "Dançar" (2021)
- "Meu Funeral" (2022)
- "Essa é Pra Transar Chorando" (2023)
- "Inimigos do Fim" (2023)
- "Cesar e Ana" (2024)
- "A Fragilidade de Ser um Machão" (2025)
- "Se Eu Morrer de Saudade" (2025)
- "Deus Está no Comando" (2025)
- "Tudo Que Eu Queria" (2025)
- "Velho Pra Sempre" (2025)
