= Rank and file =

Rank and file may refer to:

- A military term relating to the horizontal "ranks" (rows) and vertical "files" (columns) of individual foot-soldiers, exclusive of the officers
- A term derived from the above used to refer to enlisted troops, as opposed to the officers
- Rank and file (chess), the rows and columns on a chessboard
- The individual members of a political organization or labour union, exclusive of its leadership
- Rank and file movement, a blanket term for informal, Trotskyist militant groups among British trade unionists, generally strenuously opposed to the union hierarchies and often facing expulsion by them
- Rank and File Movement, a militant movement which grew within the Amalgamated Association of Iron and Steel Workers in the United States in 1934
- Rank and File (band), an American cowpunk band
  - Rank and File (album), a 1987 album by the band
- "The Rank and File" (Playhouse 90), a 1959 American television play
- "The Rank and File" (Play for Today), a 1971 BBC television play written by Jim Allen and directed by Ken Loach
- A variation of Forty Thieves (card game)
