= Matanza =

Matanza or Mattanza may refer to:

== Massacres ==
- La Matanza, the 1932 communist-indigenous rebellion in El Salvador
- La Matanza (1910–1920), a period of anti-Mexican violence in Texas, U.S.
- Second Mafia War, or Mattanza, a period of conflict involving the Sicilian Mafia 1981–1984
- La Matanza, an Indian massacre in North America, 1695

== Places ==
- La Matanza Partido, a district of Buenos Aires Province, Argentina
- Matanza River, in Argentina
- Matanza, Santander, Colombia
- La Matanza District, Peru
- La Matanza de Acentejo, Tenerife, Spain
- Matanza de los Oteros, León, Spain
- Matanzas, Cuba

== Other uses ==
- Mattanza, a traditional tuna fishing technique
- Matanza (band), a Brazilian rock band
  - Matanza Inc, a band formed by former members of Matanza
- Matanza Cueto, ring name of Jeff Cobb (born 1982), Guamanian professional wrestler

== See also ==
- Matanzas (disambiguation)
