= Kentucky Breakdown =

Studio album by Nine Pound Hammer
- Released: May 4, 2004
- Genre: Cowpunk
- Label: Acetate
- Producer: David Barrick

Nine Pound Hammer chronology
| Live at the VERA | Kentucky Breakdown | Mulebite Deluxe |

Kentucky Breakdown is an album by Owensboro, Kentucky-based cowpunk band Nine Pound Hammer, released in 2004. It marks the first new material from the band since the album Hayseed Timebomb was released ten years earlier.

== Critical reception ==
Professional ratings
Review scores
| Source | Rating |
|---|---|
| Punknews.org | 3.5/5 stars |

Punknews.org wrote that "each song is only a few chords with doubled guitar powerchords with occasional Skynard-esque riffs and solos fronted by Blaine Cartwright of Nashville Pussy fame." Ox-Fanzine wrote that "the album is great, better than any goddamn Nashville Pussy LP, and ties in seamlessly with a classic like Hayseed Timebomb."

== Track listing ==
1. Intro – 0:50
2. Rub Yer Daddy's Lucky Belly – 2:19
3. He Done Run Outta Worms – 2:02
4. Dead Dog Highway – 2:23
5. Go-3-Go – 2:20
6. Drunk, Tired & Mean – 3:19
7. Double Super Buzz – 2:11
8. Ain't Hurtin' Nobody – 2:42
9. Don't Remember Lovin' You Last Night – 2:11
10. Zebra Lounge – 2:27
11. 800 Miles – 1:55
12. If You Want to Get to Heaven – 2:34
13. Chicken Hi, Chicken Lo – 2:51
14. Goddamn Right – 2:39

== Personnel ==
- David Barrick – Producer, engineer
- Matt Bartholomy – Bass
- Blaine Cartwright – Guitar, vocals
- Mark Chalecki – Mastering
- Scott Luallen – Vocals
- Brian Pulito - Drums
- Brad Scott – Guitars on "Zebra Lounge"
