= Santa Madre Cassino =

Studio album by Matanza
- Released: 2001
- Genre: Hardcore punk, heavy metal, cowpunk
- Length: 37:22
- Label: Deckdisc

Matanza chronology
Terror em Dashville (1998)	Santa Madre Cassino (2001)	Música Para Beber e Brigar (2003)

Santa Madre Cassino is the debut studio album by the Brazilian band Matanza released in 2001.

== Track listing ==
1. "Ela Roubou Meu Caminhão" (She Stole My Truck) - 03:45
2. "Mesa de Saloon" (Saloon Table) - 03:15
3. "Eu Não Bebo Mais" (I Don't Drink Anymore) - 02:55
4. "E Tudo Vai Ficar Pior" (And Everything is Gonna Get Worse) - 02:46
5. "Tombstone City" - 01:57
6. "Rio de Whisky" (River of Whiskey ) - 03:03
7. "Quanto Mais Feio" (How Much Uglier) - 03:27
8. "Ye Ole Bluegrass Assassinate" - 02:22
9. "Santanico (part 1)" - 03:27
10. "Santanico (part 2)" - 01:22
11. "Mais Um Dia Por Aqui" (One More Day Around Here) - 03:00
12. "Imbecil" (Imbecile) - 01:35
13. "As Melhores Putas do Alabama" (The Best Whores of Alabama) - 01:34
14. "Santa Madre Cassino" - 02:47
