= Sex, Drugs and Bill Monroe =

Sex, Drugs & Bill Monroe

Studio album by Nine Pound Hammer
- Released: February 26, 2008
- Genre: Cowpunk
- Label: Acetate Records

Nine Pound Hammer chronology
Mulebite Deluxe	Sex, Drugs & Bill Monroe

Sex, Drugs & Bill Monroe is a 2008 album by Kentucky-based cowpunk band Nine Pound Hammer. The album is named after Bill Monroe, a prominent bluegrass musician from Kentucky.

It is rated four out of five stars on AllMusic.

== Track listing ==
1. I'm Yer Huckelberry (2:15)
2. Hookers And Hot Sauce (2:10)
3. Black Sheep (2:37)
4. Everybody's Drunk (2:37)
5. Fightin' Words (1:39)
6. Mama's Doin' Meth Again (2:28)
7. Right To Do You Wrong (2:06)
8. Road Hard (2:28)
9. Too Sorry To Shit (1:57)
10. Hell In My Hand (3:06)
11. Wheels Flew Off Last Night (2:26)
12. Ain't Worth Killin' (2:18)
13. Cookin' The Corn (2:45)
14. The Way It Is (2:41)
