= Sundown (Rank and File album) =

Studio album by Rank and File
- Released: 1982
- Recorded: June 1982, The Automatt, San Francisco
- Genre: Cowpunk, new wave
- Label: Warner Bros. Slash
- Producer: David Kahne

Rank and File chronology
Sundown (1982)	Long Gone Dead (1984)

Professional ratings
Review scores
Source	Rating
Allmusic	4.5/5 stars

Sundown is the debut album by Los Angeles cowpunk band Rank and File, released in 1982 on Slash Records.

== Critical reception ==
Critic Robert Christgau gave it an "A−" in his Consumer Guide, while Trouser Press called the album "effortlessly enjoyable," citing its "tuneful and tasty pop numbers, which also benefit from pretty harmonies and confident playing." It was voted one of the best albums of the year in the Village Voice's influential Pazz & Jop critics poll.

== Reissues ==
In 2003, Rhino Handmade, an imprint of Rhino Entertainment, compiled Sundown, the band's second album, Long Gone Dead, and bonus tracks on a CD entitled The Slash Years.

On its own, Sundown was reissued on CD in 2005 by Collectors' Choice Music.

Again on its own, Sundown was reissued on vinyl by Drastic Plastic Records in 2020.

== Track listing ==
All songs by Chip Kinman and Tony Kinman except as indicated.

=== Side one ===
1. Amanda Ruth (3:10)
2. (Glad I'm) Not In Love (2:29)
3. Rank and File (Alejandro Escovedo, Kinman, Session, Miller) (4:52)
4. The Conductor Wore Black (3:33)

=== Side two ===
1. Sundown (3:04)
2. I Went Walking (2:57)
3. Lucky Day (3:42)
4. I Don't Go Out Much Anymore (2:17)
5. Coyote (5:05)

== Personnel ==
- Chip Kinman - guitar, vocals, harmonica
- Tony Kinman - bass, vocals
- Slim Evans - drums
- Alejandro Escovedo - guitar, vocals
