= I'm an Old, Old Man (Tryin' to Live While I Can) =

Single by Lefty Frizzell
- B-side: "You're Just Mine (Only In My Dreams)"
- Released: October 20, 1952
- Genre: Country
- Length: 2:24
- Label: Columbia
- Songwriter: Lefty Frizzell

Lefty Frizzell singles chronology
"You're Just Mine (Only In My Dreams)" (1952)	"I'm an Old, Old Man (Tryin' to Live While I Can)" (1952)	"Hurry! (Bring Your Sweet Self Back to Me)" (1953)

"I'm an Old, Old Man (Tryin' to Live While I Can)" is a song written and sung by Lefty Frizzell and released on the Columbia label (catalog no. 21034). In December 1952, it peaked at No. 3 on Billboard's country and western best seller chart. It spent nine weeks on the charts.

The song was later covered by Merle Haggard on If We Make It Through December (1974). After Frizzell died in 1975, Haggard wrote a tribute song, "Goodbye Lefty" that referenced the 1952 song: "But the old old man is gone. There'll be no more Lefty's songs."

The country rock band Rank and File also covered the song on its album Long Gone Dead (1984).

Andre Williams and The Sadies also covered the song on their album Red Dirt (1999).
