= Smokin' Taters! =

Studio album by Nine Pound Hammer
- Released: 1992
- Recorded: July 11–13, 1991
- Studio: Coyote
- Genre: Cowpunk
- Label: Crypt
- Producer: Michael Mariconda

Nine Pound Hammer chronology
The Mud, The Blood, and The Beers (1988)	Smokin' Taters! (1992)	Hayseed Timebomb (1994)

Smokin' Taters! is an album by the Kentucky-based cowpunk band Nine Pound Hammer. It was released in 1992. The band supported the album with a European tour.

Some demos were recorded in Glasgow in 1990. "Long Gone Daddy" is a cover of the Hank Williams song.

== Critical reception ==
Professional ratings
Review scores
Source	Rating
AllMusic	2.5/5 stars

Trouser Press wrote that the album "smokes out of the speakers with redoubled purpose and fluid, road-tested rockabilly punk."

== Track listing ==
1. Long Gone Daddy
2. Cadillac Inn
3. Everything You Know Is Wrong
4. Feelin' Kinda Froggy
5. Don't Get No
6. Folsom Prison Blues
7. Turned Traitor for a Piece of Tail
8. I'm on Fire
9. Wrong Side of the Road
10. Head Bangin' Stock Boy
11. Surfabilly
12. Weasel, The

== Personnel ==
- Blaine Cartwright – Guitar
- Rob Hulsman – Drums
- Matt Bartholomy – Bass
- Scott Luallen – Vocals
- Bill & Michelle – Backing vocals
- Michael Mariconda – Producer
- Albert Caiati – Engineer
