= Pior Cenário Possível =

Studio album by Matanza
- Released: April 14, 2015
- Recorded: 2015
- Genre: Cowpunk, punkabilly
- Length: 35:38
- Label: Deckdisc
- Producer: Rafael Ramos

Matanza chronology
Thunder Dope (2012)	Pior Cenário Possível (2015)

Pior Cenário Possível (Portuguese for "Worst Possible Scenario") is the seventh and final studio album by Brazilian cowpunk band Matanza. It is the first album by the band to have two guitarists (Marcelo Donida and Maurício Nogueira) and it is also the last to feature bassist China. It was recorded at Tambor Studios, in Rio de Janeiro, and it was produced by Rafael Ramos, who also produced Nheengatu by Titãs and Setevidas by Pitty. It was released on 14 April 2015. All instruments were recorded simultaneously.

On 18 March the band announced the second video from the album, "O que Está Feito, Está Feito", recorded in Rio de Janeiro. On 24 March, they released the track "Matadouro 18" at Tenho Mais Discos Que Amigos!. Then, on 1 April, they released "Orgulho e Cinismo" at Rolling Stone Brasil and "Chance pro Azar" at Rádio Cidade on 6 April.

About the darker themes of the album, in comparison with their typical lyrics about drinking and women, vocalist Jimmy London said: "We create the concept of each Matanza album even before we write the first song. Now, however, it would be required to live in Mars to talk about a good mess, celebratory gunfire and fun. Who knows if we won't be in a better mood in the next work." About adding a second guitarist, he said: "It's one more instrument, and that means, 20% plus arranging, noise and pressure capacity. We had a process of recording similar to the other albums. We attempted to keep the sound organic, making the drums sound as if they were right there beside you, and so on. However, with each work, we improve that process. In this moment, we used the tape machine to heat up the sound, but without actually recording on it. What's the fun if everything was the same, after all?"

== Track listing ==
All tracks are written by Marco Donida.

No.	Title	Length
1.	"A Sua Assinatura" (Your Signature)	3:28
2.	"O Que Está Feito, Está Feito" (What's Done Is Done)	2:40
3.	"Matadouro 18" (Slaughterhouse 18)	2:47
4.	"A Casa em Frente ao Cemitério" (The House in Front of the Cemetery)	3:49
5.	"Sob a Mira" (On the Sights)	4:01
6.	"Pior Cenário Possível" (Worst Possible Scenario)	3:32
7.	"O Pessimista" (The Pessimist)	3:08
8.	"Chance pro Azar" (Chance for Bad Luck)	3:04
9.	"Orgulho e Cinismo" (Pride and Cynicism)	3:20
10.	"Conversa de Assassino Serial" (Serial Killer Talk)	5:27
Total length:		35:38

== Line up ==
- Jimmy London – vocals
- Jefferson "China" Cardim – bass
- Jonas Cáffaro – drums
- Marco Donida – guitar
- Maurício Nogueira – guitar

== Critical reception ==
Professional ratings
Review scores
Source	Rating
Tenho Mais Discos que Amigos!	7/10 stars

Marcos Andrade, from Tenho Mais Discos que Amigos!, said: "Even having terror as the biggest inspiration for Pior Cenário Possível, Matanza has been more intimidating and shocking in other albums", but it is still "short and direct as a good hardcore punk album with elements of heavy metal".
