= Cowboy Nation =

Western music band of late 1990s/early 2000s

Cowboy Nation was part of an ongoing series of musical collaborations between brothers Tony and Chip Kinman, who had previously led The Dils, Rank and File, and Blackbird. The band released three albums between 1997 and 2002.

== Description and reception ==
As the name suggests, Cowboy Nation was devoted to cowboy songs and other material that portrayed the Old West. As Tony Kinman stated, "Musically and thematically, Cowboy Nation is an extremely distilled version of Rank and File. The music is minimalist and the theme is cowboy/western. One guitar, one bass, and two-thirds of a drum kit. Plus Chip and I singing." As with the Kinmans' previous efforts, the singing featured the harmonies of Tony's baritone and Chip's tenor.

Music writer Chris Morris described the Kinmans' career path. From the Dils, a "politico-punk unit", "the brothers did an about-face and formulated the pioneering cowpunk band Rank and File...after that group folded, they gravitated to a harsher, almost industrial sound in Blackbird...Now they have done another volte-face with Cowboy Nation." Morris quoted Chip Kinman: "If it can't be played sitting around a campfire, it's not on the record."

Tony Kinman's 2018 obituary in the Los Angeles Times underscored the themes of how the brothers frequently shifted gears and moved counter to prevailing musical currents. It quoted a prior report on Cowboy Nation in the Colorado Springs Independent: "Once again, the Kinmans leave us, delightedly, unable to categorize them."

In reviewing the group's second album, A Journey Out of Time, Country Standard Time stated, "Cowboy Nation...with their unpretentious lyrics and their provocatively dark sound, have produced a heartfelt homage to the cowboy."

The Chicago Tribune observed of the final album, Cowgirl A-Go-Go, "Its 11 loping, authentic-as-a-saddle tracks, delivered in Tony's distinctive baritone, view the present-day world through a bygone-days prism."

Cowboy Nation performed at the inaugural Stagecoach Festival in 2007. At that time, they were described as coming out of semi-retirement.

Cowboy Nation was Tony Kinman's final band. Chip Kinman continued with Chip Kinman and PCH in 2007, followed by Ford Madox Ford in 2016.

== Personnel ==
- Tony Kinman (bass, vocals)
- Chip Kinman (guitar, harmonica, vocals)
- "Taco" John Norman (drums)
- Jamie Spidle (drums)

== Discography ==
- Cowboy Nation (Coconut Grove Recording Co., 1997). Re-released as We Do What We Please (Real West Productions, 2001).
- A Journey Out of Time (Western Jubilee/Shanachie, 2000)
- Cowgirl A-Go-Go (Paras Group International, 2002)
