= Jimmy London =

Jimmy London may refer to:

- Jimmy London (reggae singer) (born 1949), Jamaican reggae singer
- Jimmy London (rock singer) (born 1975), Brazilian punk/rock singer
