= Machete Bomb =

Brazilian samba-rock band from Curitiba

- Origin: Curitiba, Paraná, Brazil
- Genres: Samba-rock; rap rock
- Members: Madu Madureira; Vitor Salmazo; Rodrigo Suspiro; Daniel Perim; Rodrigo Spinardi
- Website: www.machetebomb.com.br

Machete Bomb is a Brazilian samba-rock band, hailing from Curitiba, Paraná. The group's leader, Otávio "Madu" Madureira, plays cavaquinho over a samba and rock and roll sound, creating a mixture influenced by Mundo Livre S/A and with which he intends to "break prejudices" and "show people" that "in Brazil, sabam did what rock contributed to abroad, (it's about) contesting, confronting, facing", with "protest songs, which speak truths and discuss sensitive topics". Besides samba-rock, the group's sound also features elements of hip hop.

== History ==
In 2013, they released the EP O Samba do Sul.

In 2015, they released their first studio album, O Samba do Sul, a three-part effort containing a total of 23 tracks. It featured Duayer, Papo Reto, DJ Ploc, Alvaro Larsen, Hurakán, Cabes MC, Rodrigo Ribeiro, Andó, J. Velloso, Alienação Afrofuturista and Xandão Menezes.

In 2017, they released their sophomore studio album, A Saga do Cavaco Profano, featuring Alessandro Ramos (Alienação Afrofuturista), Dow Raiz, Reacción Ekis, Slick the Misfit and MC Bing Man.

In 2018, they took part in a Brazilian Nirvana's In Utero tribute album titled A Soulful Tribute to Nirvana's in Utero, performing a cover of "Dumb".

In 2020, they released their third album, MXT Comvida, featuring several artists such as Fred Zero Quatro (Mundo Livre S/A), Lemoskine, Lobato and Xandão (both from O Rappa), Mateo Piracés-Ugarte (Francisco, el Hombre), Mulamba, Nave, Odair José, TUYO, BNegão, Dedé Paraízo (Demônios da Garoa), Egypcio (Tihuana), Thestrow, Pete Mcee, Pecaos, Alienação Afrofuturista, Rodrigo Samsara, El Efecto, Caio MacBeserra (Project46), DowRaiz, Andó and Janine Mathias. The album was created after Madu lost his wife and quit music in order to focus on his two children, and the effort resulted from his decision to keep going in a musical career, counting with support from the featured musicians. He performed all instruments alone and the tracks are intercalated with jingles containing audio snippets of the featured musicians commenting on the production of the songs.

== Members ==
Current line-up according to a March 2018 and the band's official website:

- Vitor Salmazo — vocals
- Otávio "Madu" Madureira — cavaquinho
- Rodrigo Suspiro — bass
- Daniel Perim — drums
- Rodrigo Spinardi — percussion

== Discography ==
=== Studio albums ===
- O Samba do Sul (2015)
- A Saga do Cavaco Profano (2017)
- Mxt Comvida

=== Remix albums ===
- Vendendo a Alma ao Diabo – Vol. I (2018)
- Vendendo a Alma ao Diabo – Vol. II (2018)

=== Live albums ===
- Psicodália 2018 ao Vivo (2018)

=== EPs ===
- O Samba do Sul (2013)
