= Blackbird (band) =

- Genres: Alternative rock, post-punk, new wave, electronic
- Years active: 1987–1994
- Past members: Chip Kinman; Tony Kinman

Blackbird was an electronic post-punk band, formed by brothers Chip and Tony Kinman after they dissolved their cowpunk band Rank and File.

Blackbird marked the third distinct musical style embraced and perpetrated by the Kinmans, first with punk rock (The Dils), followed by country punk (or cowpunk) with Rank and File, and finally the abrasive, metallic techno-pop of Blackbird.

The band's oeuvre includes three eponymous albums, the first two released by Iloki Records and produced by then-Butthole Surfers sound tech, Ric Wallace. Subsequent releases include the last album (also eponymous) released on Scotti Bros. in 1992; following the third and final full-length release, Iloki Records hired Braindead Soundmachine's Cole Coonce to produce updated versions of songs the brothers had success with in previous bands, "Class War" by The Dils and "Amanda Ruth" by Rank and File.

The Kinman brothers went on to form Cowboy Nation.

== Discography ==
- Blackbird (1988)
- Blackbird (1989)
- Blackbird (1992)
- Class War b/w Amanda Ruth (1992)
