= Long Gone Dead =

Studio album by Rank and File
- Released: 1984
- Genre: Roots rock
- Label: Slash
- Producer: Jeff Eyrich

Rank and File chronology
Sundown (1982)	Long Gone Dead (1984)	Rank and File (1987)

Long Gone Dead is the second album by the American band Rank and File, released in 1984. Founding member Alejandro Escovedo left the band prior to the recording sessions for the album.

The first single was "Sound of the Rain". The album was a commercial disappointment.

== Production ==
Recorded in Austin, the album was produced by Jeff Eyrich. Stan Lynch played drums on the album; Richard Greene played fiddle. The band made a point of engaging with any musical idea that came to them, rather than sticking to one style.

"I'm an Old Old Man" is a cover of the Lefty Frizzell song. "John Brown" is about the abolitionist.

== Critical reception ==
Professional ratings
Review scores
Source	Rating
AllMusic	3.5/5 stars
Robert Christgau	A−
The Encyclopedia of Popular Music	3/5 stars
MusicHound Rock: The Essential Album Guide	5/5 stars
The Philadelphia Inquirer	2/4 stars

Robert Christgau wrote that, "in a disquietingly cerebral way the music is very moving, with the Kinman brothers' wide-spaced close harmonies adding a unique sweet-and-sour lift to their defiantly doomy tunes." Trouser Press opined that, "lacking the first LP's lost and lonesome prairie feel, Long Gone Dead is appealing but disappointing." The New York Times stated that the band "should stick to country-rock, at least for the time being; the closer they get to authentic country music, the more plastic they sound."

The Washington Post concluded that "Rank and File is certainly pleasing enough as a pop band and sincere enough as a country act, but the band needs to rediscover the link between the two." The Philadelphia Inquirer determined that the songs "too often sound like parodies of country songs rather than the homages they apparently intend, and the vocals are frequently dolorous drags."

AllMusic wrote that, "while a more ambitious and musically diverse album than Sundown, Long Gone Dead just doesn't have the same tight focus and sharp impact of the debut." MusicHound Rock: The Essential Album Guide called the album "a vitally important [document] of the rebirth of an entire genre of American music that, watered down and pasteurized, resurfaced later in everything from John Mellencamp's first post-Cougar releases to the entire current crop of alterna-twangers."

== Track listing ==
No.	Title	Length
1.	"Long Gone Dead"
2.	"I'm an Old Old Man"
3.	"Sound of the Rain"
4.	"Hot Wind"
5.	"Tell Her I Love Her"
6.	"Saddest Girl in the World"
7.	"Timeless Love"
8.	"John Brown"
9.	"Last Night I Dreamed"
10.	"It Don't Matter"
