= Nine Pound Hammer =

American band

Nine-pound Hammer
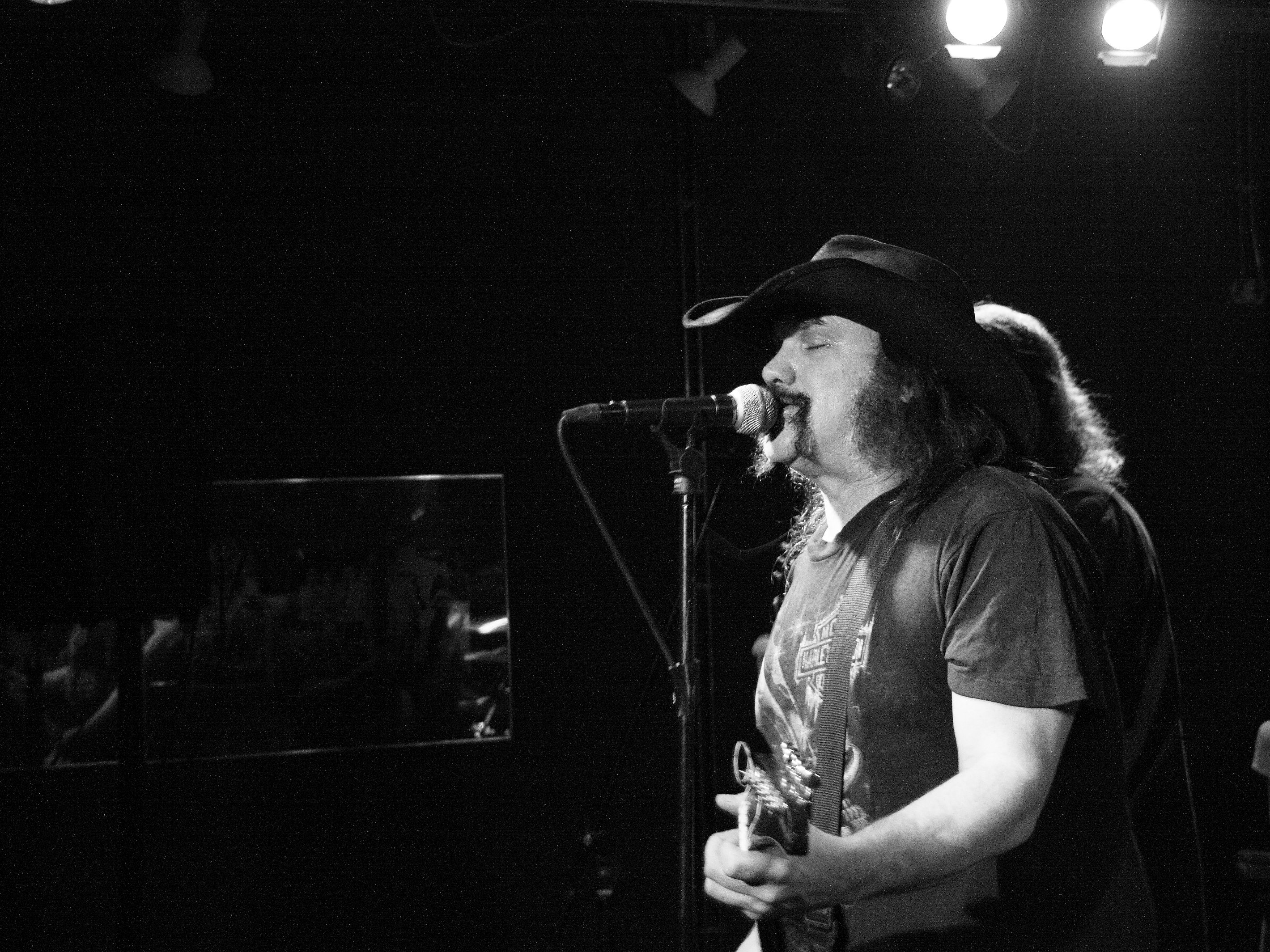
- Guitarist Blaine Cartwright at performing in November 2012

Background information
- Origin: Owensboro, Kentucky
- Genres: Hardcore punk, cowpunk
- Years active: 1985–1997, 1998-present
- Members: Scott Luallen; Blaine Cartwright; Earl Crim; Brian Pulito; Mark Hendricks

Nine-pound Hammer is an American cowpunk band. They were formed in 1985 by vocalist Scott Luallen and guitarist Blaine Cartwright in their hometown of Owensboro, Kentucky. They experienced their initial success with Crypt Records.

Nine-pound Hammer was one of the first rural hardcore punk bands to substantially incorporate rural blue collar motifs into the minimalistic hardcore sound. Their lyrics (suggestive of outlaw country) featured themes such as alcoholism, rural poverty, and violence, and included references and homages to the likes of Jesco White and Dale Earnhardt. In contrast, most of the urban, experimental cowpunk bands of 1970s/80s Los Angeles and the UK were roots rock, folk rock or New Wave bands incorporating country music instruments and influences as a secondary (sometimes temporary) aspect of their sound.

Following the breakup of the band in 1997, guitarist Blaine Cartwright formed the band Nashville Pussy, which shares many of Nine-pound Hammer's musical and lyrical conventions with the addition of a lead guitarist and a more hard rock/Southern rock-focused format.

== History ==
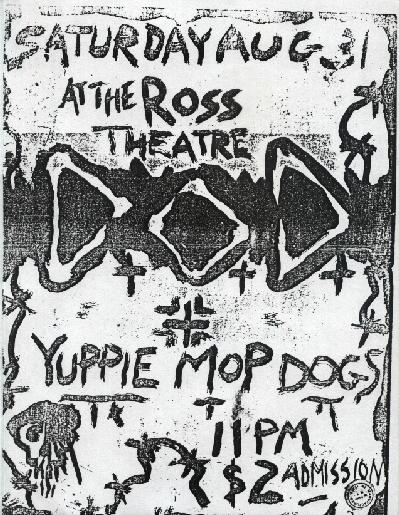
Yuppie Mop Dogs at Ross Theater, Evansville, August 1985

Nine-pound Hammer first played at the Ross Theater, opening for the Xtian rap group, the Disciples of Decadence, in nearby Evansville, Indiana, with drummer Toby Myrig, David Epperson, and bassist Brian (Forrest) Payne, in 1984. David and Brian left, and Bart Altman, thunderstick man from the Disciples of Decadence, joined on bass. This lineup played a single show at the Ross Theater as the Yuppie Mop Dogs on August 31, 1985. The band played locally in Owensboro, Kentucky and Evansville, Indiana, garnering a very loyal following before relocating to Lexington, Kentucky as the Raw Recruits. The band then changed their name to the Black Sheep and became the house band at Great Scott's Depot. Darren Howard replaced Toby, and the band became Nine-pound Hammer again. The name of the band is taken from the Merle Travis song Nine-pound hammer.

Brian Moore (Active Ingredients) and Rob Hulsman (Tarbox Ramblers) joined on bass and drums in 1988, just before recording the band's first LP, The mud, the blood, and the beers.

The band has eleven full-length albums and several EPs. The Guardian deemed Hayseed timebomb, the band's third release, a "stand-out" "trashy indie" album.

In 2005, Nine-pound Hammer was asked to pen a theme song and lyrics for 12 oz. Mouse, a new Adult Swim animated series showing on America's Cartoon Network. Singer Scott Luallen also appears in the series as the voice actor for the character Roostre. More recently, they were featured on Aqua Teen Hunger Force Colon Movie Film for Theaters Colon the Soundtrack with the track "Carl's Theme," in which the lyrics play off of the character "Carl" and one of his lines in Aqua Teen Hunger Force.

== Releases ==
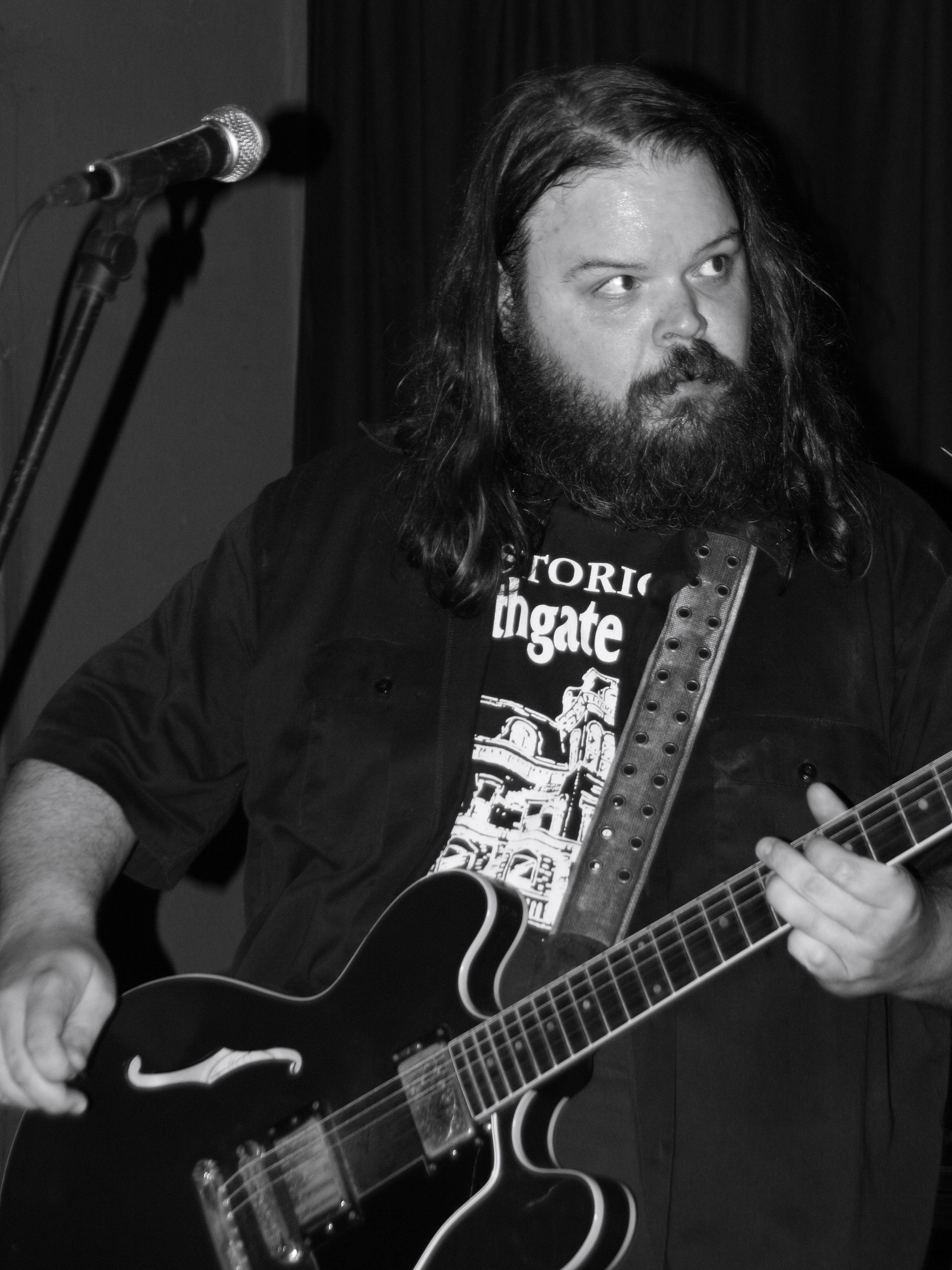
Earl Crim

=== Full-length ===
- The Mud, The Blood, and The Beers - 1988
- Smokin' Taters! - 1992
- Hayseed Timebomb - 1994
- Live At The VERA - 1999
- Kentucky Breakdown - 2004
- Mulebite Deluxe - 2005
- Sex, Drugs and Bill Monroe - 2008
- Country Classics - 2010
- Bluegrass Conspiracy - 2016
- The Barn's On Fire (Live) - 2017
- When The Sh*t Goes Down - 2021
- Rock 'n' Roll Radio - 2023

=== Other ===
- 12 oz. Mouse Theme - 2005
- Carl's Theme - Aqua Teen Hunger Force Colon Movie Film for Theaters Colon the Soundtrack - 2007

== Current line-up ==
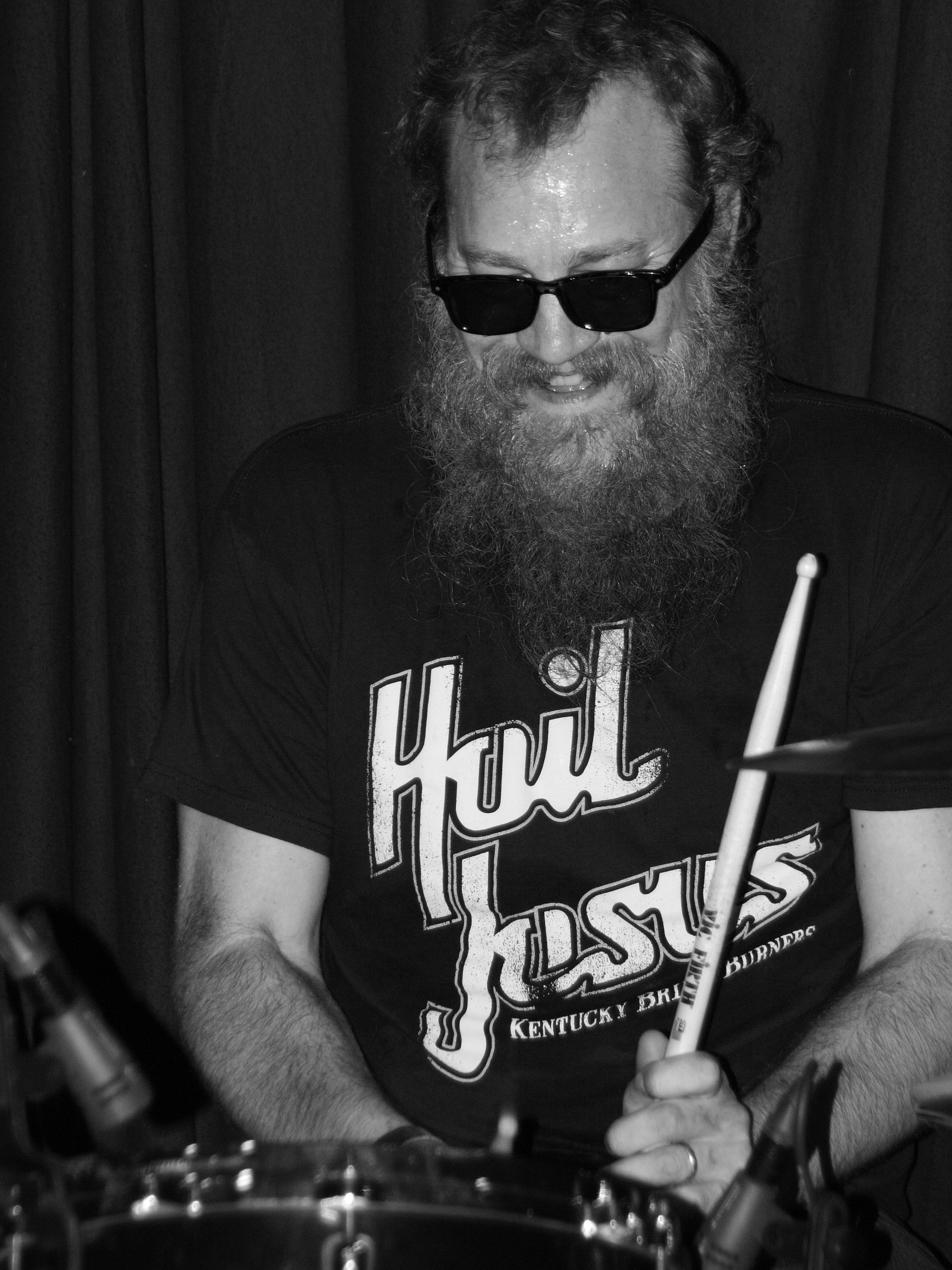
Rob Hulsman

- Scott Luallen (vocals)
- Blaine Cartwright (guitar)
- Earl Crim (guitar)
- Josh Love (drums)
- Mark Hendricks (bass)

== Former members ==
- Brian Moore (bass)
- Matt Bartholomy (bass)
- Bill Waldron (drums)
- Bart Altman (bass)
- Rob Hulsman (drums)
- Adam Neal (drums)
- Johnny Evans (Drums)
- Brian Pulito (Drums)
