= Vandoliers =

American alternative country band

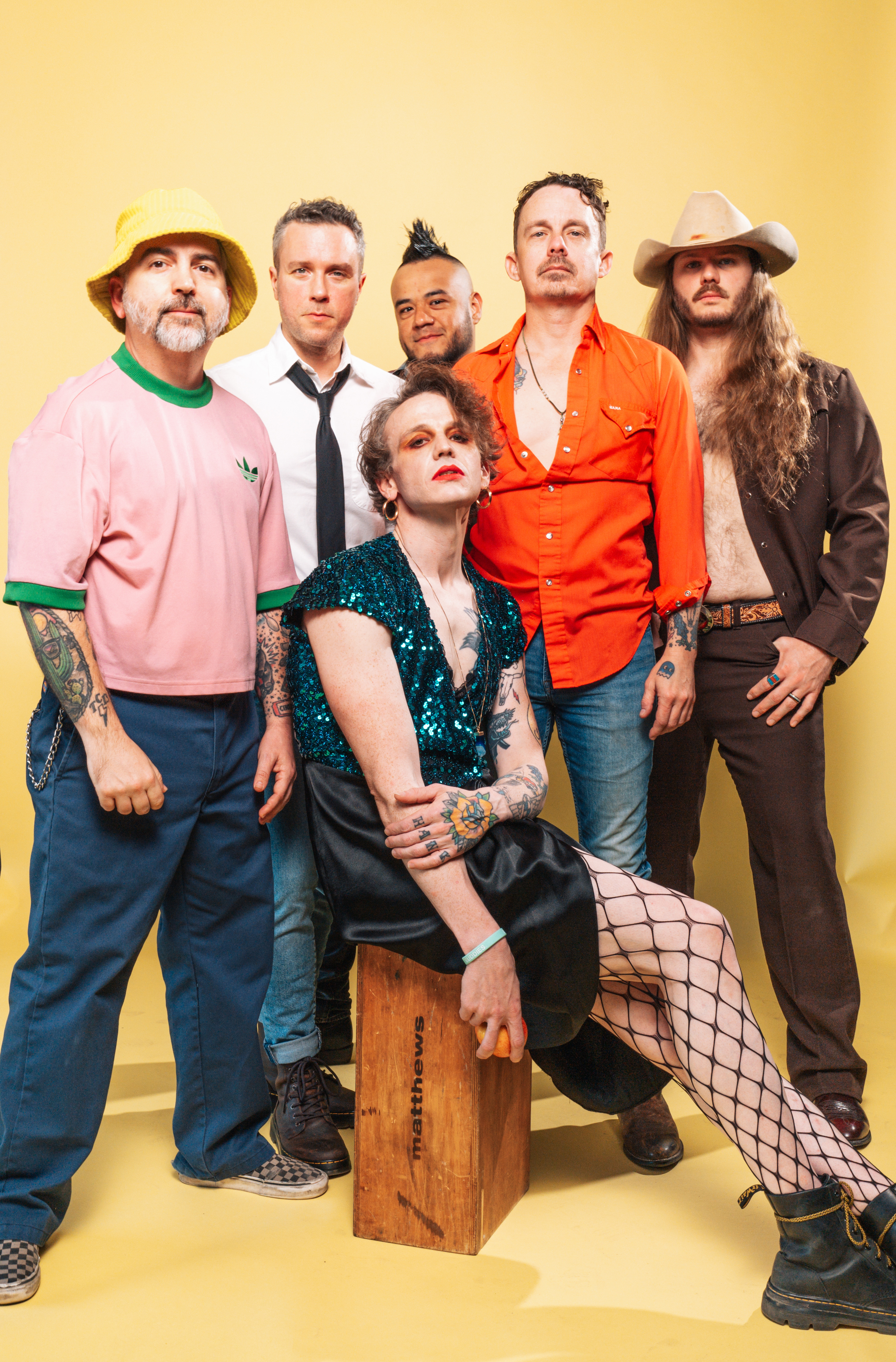
- The Vandoliers

Background information
- Origin: Dallas, Texas
- Genres: Country rock, americana, Cow punk, Alternative country
- Years active: 2015–present
- Labels: Break Maiden/Thirty Tigers, Amerikinda Records, Bloodshot Records, State Fair Records
- Members: Jenni Rose; Trey Alfaro; Travis Curry; Mark Moncrieff; Patrick Smith
- Past members: John Pedigo; Jack Russell; Guyton Sanders; Dustin Fleming; Cory Graves
- Website: http://www.vandoliers.com

Vandoliers is an American alternative country music group from Texas founded in 2015. They are signed to Break Maiden Records/Thirty Tigers and have released five studio albums.

== Background ==
Vandoliers was formed in 2015 by Jenni Rose, following the dissolution of her Fort Worth-based punk trio The Phuss, and an eye infection that left her nearly blind for eight weeks. During her recovery period, she discovered The Marty Stuart Show and the similarities between punk and country, and wrote the material that would go on to become the Vandoliers' debut album, Ameri-Kinda, during a fit of inspiration one weekend. With help from producer John Pedigo (The O's), Rose put together a DFW supergroup featuring members of well-known local folk and metal groups Whiskey Folk Ramblers, Vinyl, Revolution Nine and Armadillo Creek, and rounding out the pair's Ameri-Kinda demos.

The following year, the band signed to State Fair Records, and in October 2016, the label re-released the album. Its follow-up, The Native, was recorded in the same studio where Willie Nelson made Red Headed Stranger, and released in May 2017. The album is noted for ushering in a cowpunk resurgence, leading to shows and tours with the likes of Reverend Horton Heat and Old 97's among others.

2019 saw the band release its third album, Forever, via Bloodshot Records, its first for the label. The album was supported by extensive touring, including co-headlining dates with Cory Branan, and an opening slot with Lucero. Following 2020's pandemic-slowed year—which saw the sale of Bloodshot Records, and the band's subsequent departure from the label—the band re-grouped to record its fourth LP, The Vandoliers. It was self-released under the band's own newly-formed label Amerikinda Records. In the months leading up to its release, the band toured with Flogging Molly, including its annual St. Patrick's Day celebration in Los Angeles.

In 2023, the band garnered national attention by performing a show in Marryville, Tennessee in dresses to protest the state's newly passed anti-drag bill. The experience, Rose later said, was one of the first times she started to accept her life as a trans woman. In 2025, Rose came out publicly via an article in Rolling Stone, which coincided with the announcement of the band's fifth studio album.

== Members ==
- Jenni Rose - lead vocals, acoustic guitar
- "Papi" Trey Alfaro - drums, spoons, percussion
- Travis "The Mummy" Curry - fiddle
- Mark “Squatcher” Moncrieff - electric guitar, banjo
- Patrick "Cat Daddy" Smith - bass

== Discography ==
- Ameri-Kinda (State Fair Records, 2016)
- The Native (State Fair Records, Soundly, 2017)
- Forever (Bloodshot Records, 2019)
- The Vandoliers (Amerikinda Records, Soundly, 2022)
- Life Behind Bars (Break Maiden Records, Thirty Tigers, 2025)
