= Hayseed Timebomb =

Studio album by Nine Pound Hammer
- Released: 1994
- Genre: Cowpunk
- Length: 31:56
- Label: Crypt

Nine Pound Hammer chronology
Smokin' Taters! (1992)	Hayseed Timebomb (1994)	Live at the VERA (1999)

Hayseed Timebomb is an album by the Kentucky-based cowpunk band Nine Pound Hammer, released in 1994. The band supported the album with 10-week tour.

"Wreck of the Old 97" is a cover of the Johnny Cash version of the song.

== Critical reception ==
Professional ratings
Review scores
Source	Rating
AllMusic	3/5 stars

The Morning Call deemed the album "excellent," writing that "it takes a smart band to write painfully accurate songs such as 'Hayseed Timebomb', 'Stranded Outside Tater Knob' and 'Shotgun in a Chevy'." Trouser Press concluded that "the album’s trash-filled swamp of beer, No-Doz, junk food, sloppy sex and rifles blurs the us-them culture line in a hyped-up wail of droll debauchery."

AllMusic wrote that the band "relies on their comical faux aggression to produce something of hyper-real consequence."

== Track listing ==
#	Title	Length
1	Hayseed Timebomb	2:30
2	Skin a Buck	2:40
3	Stranded Outside Tater Knob	2:29
4	Run Fat Boy Run	2:37
5	Wreck of the Old 97	1:57
6	Shakey Puddin'	2:42
7	Devil's Playground	4:16
8	Steamroller	3:15
9	Shotgun in the Chevy	2:44
10	Fuck Pie	2:26
11	Outta the Way, Pigfuckers	2:00
12	Adios, Farewell, and Goodbye	2:20

== Personnel ==
- Bill Waldron – Drums
- Scott Luallen – Vocals
- Matt Bartholomy – Bass
- Blaine Cartwright – Guitar
