= T. Tex Edwards =

American singer-songwriter

- Born: Dallas, Texas, US
- Genres: Alternative country, outlaw country, cowpunk, garage punk, garage rock
- Occupations: Singer, songwriter, musician, performer
- Instrument: Vocals
- Years active: 1973–present
- Labels: Sympathy for the Record Industry, New Rose, Honey Records, Saustex, Get Hip

Thom "Tex" Edwards (born in Dallas, Texas, United States), is an American country and punk rock vocalist and songwriter. Allmusic Guide calls him "a pioneering, under-appreciated, and often neglected chronicler of the offbeat and eccentric traditions of country rock & roll."

== Punk years ==
T. Tex Edwards came to prominence as the lead vocalist of Dallas area punk band The Nervebreakers. They had a minor hit with the single "My Girlfriend is a Rock," and opened for bands like The Ramones in 1977, Sex Pistols on their 1978 US Tour and The Clash in 1980.

== Country rock ==
After The Nerverbreakers, influenced by The Cramps and Gun Club T. Tex turned to rockabilly with Tex & The Saddletramps. Their song "Move It!" was later covered by LeRoi Brothers, but the band soon disbanded. Other acts followed, like Out on Parole in 1984, Loafin' Hyenas in 1987, followed by a succession of other bands named tongue firmly in cheek: The Swingin' Cornflake Killers (1991–1996), Tex & The Toetags (1998–2000), The Affordable Caskets (2000–2003) and Purple Stickpin (2010–current).

Both Out on Parole and Loafin' Hyenas released LPs in the late 1980s and early 1990s followed by a succession of 7" singles on various independent labels and under numerous names. "Up Against the Floor," backed by The Swingin' Cornflake Killers, came out in 1996 and a retrospective compilation of odds and ends "Intexicated!" came out in 2012.

== Partial discography ==
Title	Label	Year
The Nervebreakers Politics 7"	Wild Child	1978
The Nervebreakers Hijack the Radio 7"	Wild Child	1979
The Nervebreakers I'd Much Rather Be With the Boys 7"	Wild Child	1981
T. Tex Edwards & Out on Parole Smitty 7"	Sympathy For the Record Industry	1989
Loafin' Hyenas Scatter 7"	Sympathy For the Record Industry	1989
Loafin' Hyenas Forbidden See 7"	Sympathy For the Record Industry	1989
T. Tex Edwards & Out on Parole Pardon Me, I've Got Someone To Kill	Sympathy For the Record Industry	1989
T. Tex Edwards & The Sickoids Lee Harvey Was a Friend of Mine 7"	Sympathy For the Record Industry	1990
Loafin' Hyenas The Loafin' Hyenas	New Rose	1991
T. Tex Edwards & Lithium X-Mas Strange Movies 7"	Sympathy For the Record Industry	1991
T. Tex Edwards & The Swingin' Cornflake Killers Jekyll & Hyde 7"	Honey	1993
T. Tex Edwards & The Swingin' Cornflake Killers Jekyll & Hyde 7"	Honey	1993
Nervebreakers Hijack the Radio	Honey	1994
Nervebreakers We Want Everything	Honey	1994
T. Tex Edwards & The Swingin' Cornflake Killers Up Against the Floor	Honey	1996
T. Tex Edwards Intexicated!	Saustex	2012
T. Tex Edwards & Homer Henderson Strychnine Wine 7"	Kritterhex Records	2013
