= Matanzas (disambiguation) =

Matanzas is the capital city of the Cuban province of Matanzas.

Matanzas may also refer to:

== Places ==
- Matanzas Province, Cuba
- Matanzas, Chile
- Matanzas, Dominican Republic
- Matanzas Bay, Florida, U.S.
- Matanzas Beach, Illinois, U.S.
- Matanzas Creek, California, U.S.
- Matanzas River, in Florida, U.S.
  - Matanzas Inlet

== Sport ==
- FC Matanzas, a Cuban professional football club
- Matanzas (Cuban League), a defunct baseball team before 1992
- Cocodrilos de Matanzas, a Cuban baseball team, formed in 1992

== Other uses ==
- Matanzas Formation, a geologic formation in Cuba
- Matanzas High School, Florida, U.S.
- USS Matanzas, a proposed United States Navy seaplane tender
- Matanzas (schooner-barge), a shipwreck in Lake Huron, the Great Lakes

== See also ==
- Matanza (disambiguation)
- Fort Matanzas National Monument, Florida, U.S.
