= The Dils =

American punk rock band

"Class War"
Sample of The Dils "Class War" from Dils Dils Dils LP (1978)

"I Hate the Rich"
Sample of The Dils' "I Hate the Rich" from the Class War LP (1978)

The Dils were an American punk rock band formed 1976 and active until 1980, originally from Carlsbad, California, and fronted by the brothers Chip Kinman and Tony Kinman. They appeared as the second act in the "battle of the bands" sequence in Cheech and Chong's film, Up In Smoke, where they can be heard before being seen performing "You're Not Blank".

== History ==
Soon after forming in late 1976, The Dils relocated to San Francisco, where they would have a significant influence on that city's embryonic punk scene (bassist Tony Kinman played briefly with The Avengers during 1977), and then Los Angeles, becoming one of the major bands in the early Los Angeles punk scene too. They were known for their conspicuous radical left politics, and for a strong melodic sense that earned them the nickname "punk rock Everly Brothers".

Their debut single was "I Hate The Rich" / "You're Not Blank" (the latter covered by the Minneapolis punk band Dillinger Four), on Los Angeles–based label What? Records, released in 1977.

Their next record was their critical high-point, 1977's "Class War" / "Mr. Big" (the former covered by Canadian punks D.O.A.), issued on the Dangerhouse label, in a pressing of 1500 copies entitled "198 Seconds Of The Dils". The last contemporary release was a three-sided double-7" in 1980, "Made In Canada", produced by Bob Rock, which showed a gathering roots rock orientation. The Dils opened for The Clash in Santa Monica in 1980 and later that year the band dissolved after playing a final show with Black Flag.

Music from The Dils (including material unreleased during the band's lifetime) remains available.

=== Possible Visual Influence ===
A 2021 article in Guitar World magazine discussed the possible linkage between Dils guitarist Chip Kinman's decoration of his instrument and the famous Frankenstrat of Eddie Van Halen.

== Post-breakup ==
The Kinmans continued to follow the roots rock direction, giving birth to the new "cowpunk" genre with their band Rank and File in the 1980s, along with Alejandro Escovedo,. After a move in a different direction with a rock guitar and drum-machine noise project, Blackbird, they then cast a spotlight on "cowboy music" with Cowboy Nation in the 1990s and early 2000s. In 2016, the Kinman brothers reunited for Chip's new band, Ford Madox Ford. Released by Porterhouse records, Ford Madox Ford's debut album, This American Blues, featured Chip on vocals and guitar, Dewey Peek (Giuliano Scarfo) on lead guitar, Matt Littell on bass and S. Scott Aguero on drums, and Tony Kinman as producer.

Tony Kinman died on May 4, 2018.

== Revival ==
Chip Kinman revived The Dils in 2019, with the first show at The Grand Star Jazz Club in Los Angeles' Chinatown on January 27. The following night, The Dils played at San Diego's Casbah Club. Joining Kinman was his stepson Giuliano Scarfo on drums, plus Brian Melendez on bass and backing vocals.

== Discography ==
- "I Hate The Rich" / "You're Not Blank" 7" (What? Records 1977)
  - Reissued in 1990 on Gift Of Life Records
  - Both songs + "What Goes On" (live, prev unreleased) included on V/A LP/CD What? Stuff (Iloki Records 1990)
1. "I Hate The Rich"
2. "You're Not Blank"
- "198 Seconds Of The Dils" 7" (Dangerhouse Records 1977)
  - Side A is available on the V/A LP/CD Dangerhouse Volume 1 and Side B can be found on Dangerhouse Volume 2, both albums on Frontier Records
1. "Class War"
2. "Mr.Big"
- "Made In Canada" 2x7" (Rogelletti Records 1980)
  - A re-recording of "Sound of the Rain" appeared on the Rank and File album Long Gone Dead (Slash Records)
  - Three slower songs
1. "Sound Of The Rain"
2. "Red Rockers"
3. "It's Not Worth It."
- Live:Dils LP (Triple X/Iloki Records 1987)
- The Dils Live 1977–1980 LP (Lost Records, 1990)
- Dils Dils Dils LP (Bacchus Archives 1991) (reissued on CD (1992) Damaged Goods)
  - Side A has the eight studio songs mentioned above on it.
  - Side B contains live tracks from 1978 and 1979.
- The Last Goodbye (The Dils album)|The Last Goodbye LP (bootleg 199?)
  - A live recording from 1980.
- Class War LP (Dionysus/Bacchus archives 2000)
  - Includes the first 7" and 10 live songs recorded in 1980 previously released on The Dils Live 1977–1980 LP.

=== Compilation appearances ===
- We're Desperate: The L.A. Scene (1976–79) (Rhino 1993) - "I Hate The Rich", "Mr. Big"
