= Jimmy London (rock singer) =

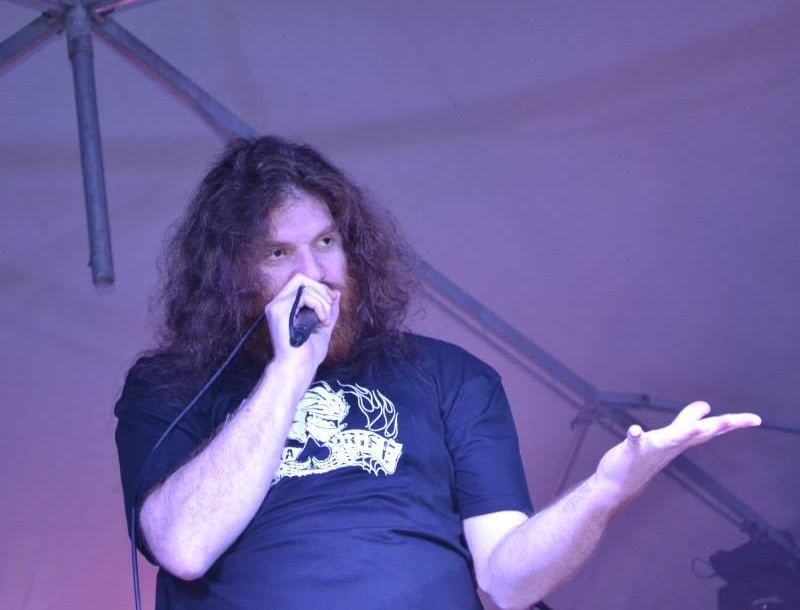
- London in Laguna, Santa Catarina at Festival Agosto Negro in 2013

Background information
- Born: Bruno Munk London; 16 July 1976 (age 50); Rio de Janeiro, Brazil
- Origin: Rio de Janeiro, Brazil
- Genres: Hardcore punk, heavy metal, cowpunk, punk rock
- Occupations: Singer, songwriter, record producer, television host, voice actor
- Instrument: Voice
- Years active: 1996–present
- Website: http://www.matanzaritual.com.br/

Bruno Munk London (born 16 July 1976), known professionally as Jimmy London, is a Brazilian musician, ex lead singer and co-founder of the hardcore punk band Matanza. In addition to his musical career, he was also the host of Pimp My Ride Brasil and the voice of "Fornalha", a character in the cartoon The Jorges, both appearing on MTV Brasil. He has also acted as a record producer, including the EP of garage rock band De'la Roque, whose drummer, Jonas, also plays in Matanza.

== Controversy ==
He earned a reputation for having an explosive temper after two distinct incidents. In the first, he had a misunderstanding which nearly turned into a fight with the lead singer of NX Zero, Di Ferrero, at a football match. In the second, he got into an argument with the hosts of TV show Rockgol, Paulo Bonfá e Marco Bianchi, live on national TV. This was viewed by some as a possible marketing plot designed to promote Pimp My Ride Brasil, which he hosted.
