= The Nervebreakers =

Nervebreakers
- Origin: Dallas, Texas, United States
- Genres: Punk rock
- Years active: 1973 - 1981; 2007 - present
- Labels: Wild Child Records; E.S.R.; Existential Vacuum; Get Hip Records; Rave Up Records
- Members: T. Tex Edwards; Mike Haskins; Barry Kooda; Bob Childress; Carl Edmund Giesecke

Nervebreakers are a Dallas-area punk rock band that formed in 1973. The band became known for melodic, rocking punk with liberal doses of George Jones and psychedelia, and has the distinction of being one of the few bands to open for The Sex Pistols.

== Background ==
Nervebreakers started as a cover band playing songs from the 1960s. As the Ramones and The Sex Pistols became big in America, the band was able to find a sustaining audience. The band's first big break came when they opened for the Ramones on July 24, 1977 at The Electric Ballroom, a dance hall in the industrial district of Dallas. In January 1978, Nervebreakers opened for The Sex Pistols at The Longhorn Ballroom, and a photo of guitarist Barry Kooda appeared in the March 1978 issue of Rolling Stone Magazine. Later that year, the band recorded their debut EP, Politics. The song "My Girlfriend is A Rock" became a runaway hit in San Francisco, Sacramento, and Boston, and was later covered by the Angry Samoans and Wool, among others. The band also opened for The Clash, John Cale, The Police and Johnny Thunders.

The band contacted legendary psychedelic rock pioneer and Texas native Roky Erickson and wound up doing double duty by opening several shows as Nervebreakers, as well as being Erickson's backing band. A live recording of one of these shows was released on CD by the French record company New Rose Records.

In 1979 they recorded a single for Wild Child Records containing the songs "Hijack the Radio" and "Why Am I So Flipped," and contributed two songs ("So Sorry" and "I Love Your Neurosis") to the ESR compilation "Are We Too Late For The Trend?" They recorded another song, "I Don't Believe In Anything," but it was not released.

By 1980, Nervebreakers were one of the biggest bands in Dallas. They began recording a full-length album, We Want Everything, on May 27 that year, but the album remained unreleased until 1994 when a vinyl LP on the Texas rarities/reissue label Existential Vacuum was released to rave reviews. Shortly thereafter, the album was picked up by garage/punk label Get Hip Records, and a CD was made available worldwide. In 2000, Italian label Rave Up Records released Hijack the Radio, a vinyl collection of singles, rarities and live cuts.

After the departure of Mike Haskins and Bob Childress in 1981, Paul Quigg and James Flory joined, and Nervebreakers won the Agora's Battle of the Bands in Dallas. The prize was recording time at Pantego Studios, where they recorded the Thom Edwards/Mike Haskins original "Girls, Girls, Girls, Girls, Girls," along with an obscure Rolling Stones cover, "I'd Much Rather Be With The Boys." The single was released on black and blue vinyl in a clear sleeve, but by then the band had already parted company.

In 2014, the AMC series Halt and Catch Fire, which takes place in the 1980s, featured the Nervebreakers' "I Love Your Neurosis" briefly during the opening sequence of the fourth episode of the series' first season.

=== Reforming ===
Mike, Tex, Barry, Carl and Bob re-entered the studio in 2007-2008 to record new original material for an album entitled Face Up to Reality, which was initially slated for release in 2011. In 2009, Nervebreakers returned to live performance, with several shows in Austin and Dallas.

== Band members ==
- Thom "Tex" Edwards: Vocals
- Mike Haskins: Lead Guitar/Vocals
- Barry "Kooda" Huebner: Rhythm Guitar/ Vocals
- Carl Giesecke: Drums
- Pierre Thompson: Bass; was replaced by Clarke Blacker and later "BBQ" Bob Childress
- Paul Quigg (Guitar) and James Flory (Bass) replaced Mike and Bob for the East Coast tour and the 45 single *"Girls.../...Boys"
- Walter Brock: Farfisa; was instrumental in writing some of the band's most notable early songs prior to the name change from Mr. Nervous Breakdown to Nervebreakers when Walter left and Barry joined.
- Tom Ordon: sometime manager and proprietor of Wild Child Records which released three singles for the band.
