= Matanza Inc =

Brazilian cowpunk band

- Genres: Cowpunk
- Years active: 2019–present
- Members: Vital Cavalcante; Maurício Nogueira; Donida; Dony Escobar; Jonas

Matanza Inc is a Brazilian rock band formed by former members of Matanza.

== History ==
In May 2018, Matanza announced they would end the band in October of the same year due to "matters that need to be dealt with, professional possibilities that need to be contemplated and artistic needs that [...] take to distinct paths".

On 11 January 2019, the former members of the band, without London, announced their reunion with vocalist Vital Cavalcante, forming a new band named Matanza Inc.

== Members ==
- Vital Cavalcante – vocals (2019–present)
- Maurício Nogueira – lead and rhythm guitar (2019–present)
- Marco Donida – lead and rhythm guitar (2019–present)
- Dony Escobar – bass (2019–present)
- Jonas – drums(2019–present)

== Discography ==
Studio albums

- 2019 – Crônicas do Post Mortem: Um Guia Para Demônios e Espíritos Obsessores
