= Rank and File (album) =

Studio album by Rank and File
- Released: 1987
- Genre: Hard rock
- Label: Rhino
- Producer: Bill Pfordresher

Rank and File chronology
Long Gone Dead (1984)	Rank and File (1987)

Rank and File is an album by the American band Rank and File, released in 1987. The band supported the album with a North American tour. The first single was "Black Book". Rank and File was the band's final album, with the Kinman brothers forming a new band, Blackbird, before the end of the year.

== Production ==
The album was produced by Bill Pfordresher. The band chose to shift from a country-influenced sound to a more hard rock style, in part due to years of playing live. After having an album rejected by Warner Bros. (which Van Dyke Parks almost produced), the band recorded demos for many record companies before signing to Rhino Records. Most of the album's songs were written and worked out during tours; many are about the concerns of urban blue collar workers. "Pistol Dawn" is about apartheid in South Africa. "Good Times" employs synthesized strings.

== Critical reception ==
Professional ratings
Review scores
Source	Rating
AllMusic	2.5/5 stars
The Encyclopedia of Popular Music	2/5 stars
Los Angeles Times	3/4 stars
MusicHound Rock: The Essential Album Guide	1.5/5 stars

The Chicago Tribune praised the "barbed-wire guitars and catchy melodies." The Los Angeles Times deemed the album "semi-heavy metal, arena-rock" and "an accomplished and eclectic transitional record." The Orange County Register wrote that the band "left behind most of the rawhide melodies and close country harmony singing, not to mention the youthful edge, that made their earlier material so appealing." The Houston Chronicle determined that "the band has gone overboard in shedding its rootsy style to emerge as more a mainstream rock entry into the radio/concert sweepstakes."

MusicHound Rock: The Essential Album Guide noted the Kinmans' "odd but frequent penchant towards style-juggling career suicide."

== Track listing ==
No.	Title	Length
1.	"Black Book"
2.	"One Big Thing"
3.	"Golden Age"
4.	"RBT"
5.	"Pistol Dawn"
6.	"Sweet Life"
7.	"Good Times"
8.	"Oh! That Girl"
9.	"Unlucky in Love"
10.	"Love House"
