= Rank and File (band) =

American country rock band

- Genres: Alternative country, cowpunk, post-punk, new wave
- Years active: 1981–1987
- Labels: Slash, Rhino
- Spinoff of: The Dils
- Past members: Chip Kinman; Tony Kinman; Alejandro Escovedo; Slim Evans; Bobby Kahr; Jeff Ross

Rank and File was an American country rock band established in 1981 in Austin, Texas by brothers Chip Kinman and Tony Kinman, who had been members of the seminal California punk rock band The Dils. The band were forerunners in combining the musical rawness and Do It Yourself punk aesthetic with the style and ambience of country and western music, helping to create a subgenre known as cowpunk. After releasing three albums, the band terminated in 1987.

== History ==
=== Formation ===
According to Chip Kinman, the original Rank and File came together in the late 70s: "When the Nuns and the Dils were still together, we did a side project kind of thing with Al, me, Chip, Richie Detrick from the Nuns, and Jeff Rafael, the Nuns drummer. We had that side project and we called that Rank and File, we didn't sound like the Rank and File that we later put together, but that was what we were called." Two Rank and File demos recorded in 1978 were later released on the Chip & Tony Kinman compilation Sounds Like Music on the Omnivore Recordings label.

In 1981, the brothers Chip and Tony Kinman split up their influential political punk band The Dils, based in Carlsbad, California, and departed for the East. After a brief time in New York City, the brothers landed in the musical mecca of Austin, Texas, to start a new band. There they again joined forces with guitarist Alejandro Escovedo of The Nuns to form the new Rank and File. Chip Kinman also played guitar while Tony was on bass. The drummer was Slim Evans.

Chip Kinman later recalled the difficulty the band had at the time of its launch, during which "people were grossed out" by the band's heavy-on-the-country, light-on the punk sound. "We'd go into New Wave clubs, and no one was playing country music. We'd play those songs, and we'd never get asked back," Kinman remembered.

=== Recording history ===
Rank and File released three albums—two on prominent Los Angeles label Slash Records and a third on the offbeat, retro-oriented Rhino Records.

The band's debut album, Sundown, was released in June 1982 on Slash Records.

Their second album, 1984's Long Gone Dead, included a cover version of a tune by Lefty Frizzell, and made use of traditional country instrumentation such as a steel guitar and fiddle. Chicago Tribune music critic Tom Popson emphasized the band's employment of "a lot of Johnny Cash-style rockabilly guitar lines" as part of that particular project. Jeff Ross was the other guitarist on this album. He had replaced Junior Brown, who appeared on stage with Rank and File but did not feature on any recordings.

The band's third and final release, Rank and File on Rhino Records, introduced Bobby Kahr on drums, replacing Evans. Released in 1987, it marked a move from traditional country to more pop-oriented country-tinged fare, which the band deemed "a little easier for the normal person to pick up on".

In 2006, Tony Kinman discussed how the delay in recording the third album damaged Rank and File's career and caused them to lose their desire. "That’s basically why that third album sounds like it does, heavy metal and hard rock or something," he said. "It’s just wrong." The band broke up soon afterward.

=== Stylistic trendsetters ===
While continuing to espouse their personal political views, the Kinmans saw their new band as a more entertaining departure from the intensity of hardcore punk, embracing the sound and cultural ambience of country music, albeit with a post-punk spin. In a 1986 interview with Flipside magazine, bassist Tony Kinman emphasized the band's willingness to shatter stylistic preconceptions to become trendsetters:

"We're brave, we're not afraid to do stuff, most people are. They're deathly afraid to do anything different. ... [W]hen everybody else was talking about how stupid country music was, country music was the last thing to like, if you wore a cowboy hat you were a redneck, you know, we decided go say, 'Yeah, we play country music, it's fun.'

"Up in San Francisco, KUSF Wave, their magazine, did the first review Rank and File ever got, live review. They said we sucked, and then they said, 'What are these guys trying to do, start a trend?' Well, that's the way it worked out, but only because we were brave enough and smart enough to do it first. That's how you get to be influential—if you're brave enough to do something different and you're smart enough to do it right. Otherwise you're just another dumb-ass band."

The band appeared on PBS's nationally broadcast country showcase Austin City Limits.

=== Later projects ===
The Kinmans' next project was the synthpop, guitar and drum-machine based, Blackbird. They would return to the cowpunk subgenre with another band, a minimalistic three-piece band called Cowboy Nation that released its debut album in January 1997 on Shock Records from Australia. In 2018, The Kinman brothers reunited for Chip's new band Ford Madox Ford. Released by Porterhouse Records, Ford Madox Ford's debut album, This American Blues, featured Chip on vocals and guitar, Matt Littell on bass, S. Scott Aguero on drums, Dewey Peak on lead guitar and Tony Kinman as producer.

Alejandro Escovedo formed the True Believers with his brother Javier, before launching a solo songwriting and recording career.

Tony Kinman died on May 4, 2018.

== Discography ==
- Sundown, Slash Records, 1982
- Long Gone Dead, Slash Records, 1984
- Rank and File, Rhino Records, 1987
