= El Efecto =

Brazilian rock/MPB band

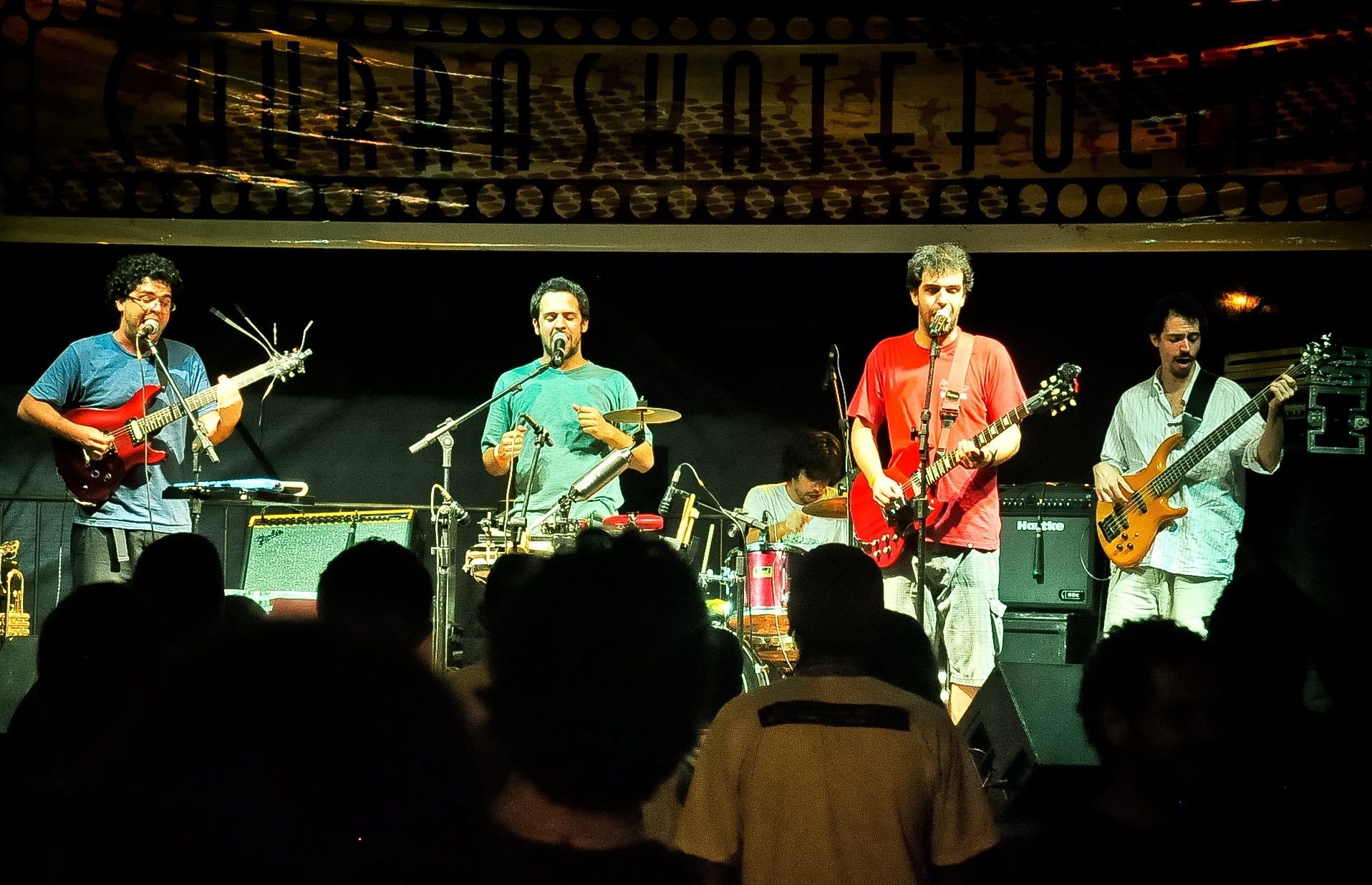
- El Efecto live in at the 2012 Festival Recontagem in Contagem, Minas Gerais. From left to right: Bruno Danton, Tomás Rosati, Gustavo Loureiro, Pablo Barroso and Eduardo Baker.

Background information
- Origin: Rio de Janeiro, Rio de Janeiro
- Genres: Rap rock; alternative rock; MPB
- Years active: 2002–present
- Labels: Independent
- Members: Aline Gonçalves; Bruno Danton; Cristine Ariel; Eduardo Baker; Pedro Lima; Gustavo Loureiro; Tomás Rosati; Tomás Tróia
- Website: www.elefecto.com.br

El Efecto is a Brazilian rock band, formed in 2002 by Tomás Rosati, Bruno Danton and Eduardo Baker. All their studio works are available for free download at their official website. Their lyrics often deal with political and social subjects.

In 2013, their third album Pedras e Sonhos (Rocks and Dreams) made the group be nominated for the Brazilian Music Awards, in the category Best Pop/Rock/Reggae/Hip hop/Funk Group.

In December 2014, they released their fourth album, A Cantiga É uma Arma, (Cantiga Is a Weapon) which features four acoustic re-recordings and two new songs, also acoustic. That album is a studio version of a show format they decided to use to make it possible for them to perform in places with poor infrastructure for electric music. Both the new songs were composed in 2013, when the band toured Portugal and Spain. One of the re-recordings, "Ciranda", received a video with a guest appearance of singer Daíra Saboia.

== Members ==
- Aline Gonçalves – flute, clarinet
- Bruno Danton – vocals, guitar, trumpet
- Cristine Ariel – guitar, cavaquinho, vocals
- Eduardo Baker / Pedro Lima – bass
- Gustavo Loureiro – drums
- Tomás Rosati – vocals, cavaquinho, percussion, clarinet
- Tomás Tróia – guitar, vocals

== Discography ==
=== Albums ===
- Como Qualquer Outra Coisa (2004)
- Cidade das Almas Adormecidas (2008)
- Pedras e Sonhos (2012)
- A Cantiga É uma Arma (2014)
- Memórias do Fogo (2018)

=== EPs ===
- Novas Músicas Velhas Angústias (2010)

=== Live ===
- Ao Vivo no Méier (2018)
