= Matanza (band) =

Brazilian rock band

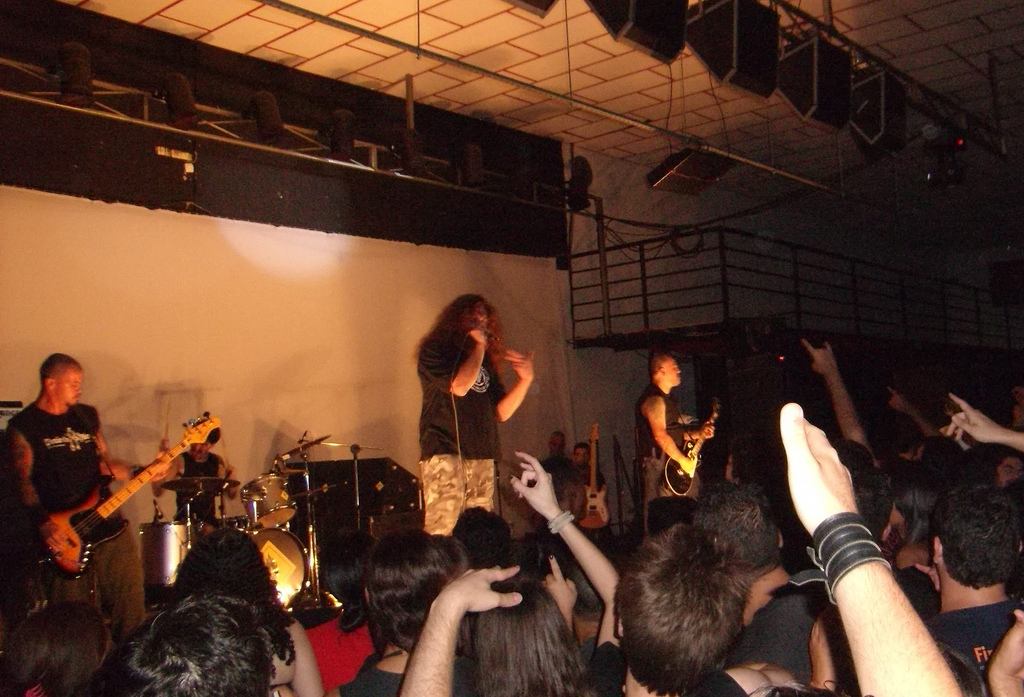
- Matanza Concert at Plaza Hall, Sorocaba in December 2010.

Background information
- Origin: Rio de Janeiro, Brazil
- Genres: Hardcore punk; heavy metal; cowpunk; psychobilly; countrycore
- Years active: 1996–2018
- Labels: Abril Music, Deckdisc
- Spinoffs: Matanza Inc
- Past members: Maurício Nogueira; Donida; Dony Escobar; Jonas; Jimmy London; Diba; Nervoso; Fausto; China
- Website: www.matanza.com.br

Matanza was a Brazilian hardcore punk band from Rio de Janeiro, formed in 1996. Their music is a blend of hardcore punk, country and heavy metal, thus falling into a subgenre known as countrycore.

== Biography ==
Matanza was formed in 1996 by Jimmy London and Donida, with the idea of exploring the simple and straightforward melodies of the early career of the American singer Johnny Cash, adapted to the drum tempo of Scottish punk band The Exploited. With drummer Nervoso and bassist Diba, they recorded a demo in 1998 called Terror em Dashville.

In 1999, a new recording would attract the attention of producer Rafael Ramos of Deckdisc, and lead Matanza to sign with the now-defunct Abril Music for the release of their first CD. With China on bass guitar, Santa Madre Cassino was recorded in December 2000, and released in March the following year, shortly before the band was dropped by their record label for the lack of a radio hit.

Matanza then brought Ramos to the studio to record their second album, Música para Beber e Brigar (Music to Drink and Brawl), with Fausto on the drums this time.

An album highlight is "Bom é Quando Faz Mal" ("It's good is when it's bad") whose music videos were directed by Eduardo Kurt, who was also responsible for "Ela Roubou Meu Caminhão" ("She Stole My Truck") from the first album, and all the videos from their tribute to Johnny Cash.

The project To Hell with Johnny Cash started out as a set of four songs the band would play at their shows, but in a short time, grew to a full 12-track album, containing only covers of Johnny Cash songs.

Recorded in mid-2006 and released in October of that year, A Arte do Insulto (The Art of Insult) revealed a vastly more professional band. The seriousness of the music was expressed in the tone of the lyrics, the weight of the composition and intensity of their live shows, which would later become a DVD.

Promotion of the album also included the video for "Clube dos Canalhas" ("Scoundrels' Club") directed by Rudi Lagemann and shot by Tuca Andrade, as well as the magazine Matanza Comix with comics by Alan Sieber, Arnold White, Daniel Ete, among others, Donida himself being the editor of the publication.

The record MTV Apresenta Matanza recorded at Hangar 110 in December 2008 and directed by Romi Atarashi, featured Jonas on drums and marks the transition to a new phase. Guitarist Donida left the stage to devote himself exclusively to composing the band's music. He was replaced onstage by Mauricio Nogueira (Ex-Torture Squad).

Five years after A Arte do Insulto Matanza released Odiosa Natureza Humana (Hateful Human Nature) in March on Deckdisc. Work on the fifth studio album (and fourth of new material) began in 2010 and was recorded in three days, live to tape (no digital recording), produced by Rafael Ramos.

In 2015, the band announced the departure of bassist China, who was replaced by Dony Escobar. According to the band, China left Matanza because he wanted to play the guitar only. Before leaving, he took part of the recordings of the band's seven full-length album, Pior Cenário Possível (Worst Case Scenario), released in April of the same year and the first album with Maurício taking part of the songwriting process.

In May 2018, Matanza announced they would end the band in October of the same year due to "matter questions that need to be dealt with, professional possibilities that need to be contemplated and artistic needs that [...] take to distinct paths".

On 11 January 2019, the former members of the band announced a new version of the band without vocalist Jimmy London, who was replaced by Vital Cavalcante.

== Style and influences ==
Frequent topics in the band's sarcastic and cynical lyrics are hatred, violence, alcohol, and women. They have a "Wild West" atmosphere. The media dubbed the style created by the band as "country-core". The band members are fans of Johnny Cash, and in 2005, they recorded an album of covers of songs from the early stage of his career, dubbed To Hell With Johnny Cash. In their 2006 album, A Arte do Insulto, Matanza explores various aspects of traditional Irish music. Other major influences include: Motörhead, Slayer, Dropkick Murphys and The Exploited, basically, extreme metal and punk rock bands.

The main songwriter was Donida.

== Members ==
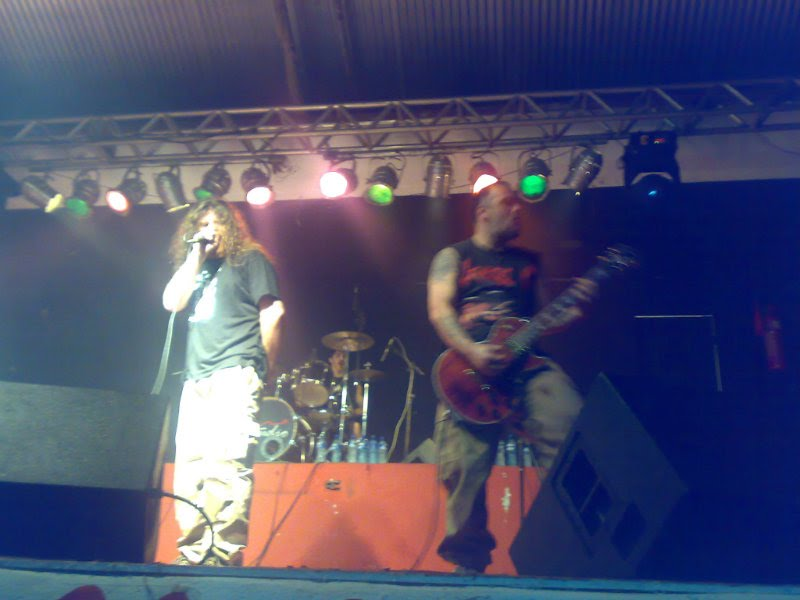
Matanza Concert at the Cabo Branco club in João Pessoa (PB) - 07/23/11

=== Last line-up ===
- Jimmy London – vocals (1996–2018)
- Donida – guitar (1996–2018; studio only 2008–2018)
- Maurício Nogueira – guitar (2008–2018)
- Jonas Cáffaro – drums (2008–2018)
- Dony Escobar – bass (2015–2018)

=== Former members ===
- Diba – bass (1996–2003)
- Nervoso – drums (1996–2003)
- China – bass (2003–2015)
- Fausto – drums (2003–2008)

== Discography ==
=== Studio albums ===
- (2002) Santa Madre Cassino
- (2003) Música Para Beber e Brigar
- (2005) To Hell with Johnny Cash
- (2006) A Arte do Insulto
- (2011) Odiosa Natureza Humana
- (2012) Thunder Dope
- (2015) Pior Cenário Possível

=== Other releases ===
- (1998) Terror em Dashville (demo album)
- (2008) MTV Apresenta Matanza (live/video album)

== Side projects ==
The bassist and the guitarist, Donida and China, have a side project called Enterro (Burial). Enterro is a black metal band, and released its first album in 2008, Nunc Scio Tenebris Lux.

Donida edited the band's magazine "Matanza Comix" in mid-2007.

Jimmy London was involved with a series of programs on MTV Brasil. In addition to Rockgol, where the whole band participated in a soccer tournament, Jimmy presented the program Pimp My Ride Brazil in 2007, and did voice work for cartoons. He also participated in a song with the band Rock Rocket, called "Eu Queria me Casar".
