= Cowpunk =

Punk rock subgenre and music scene

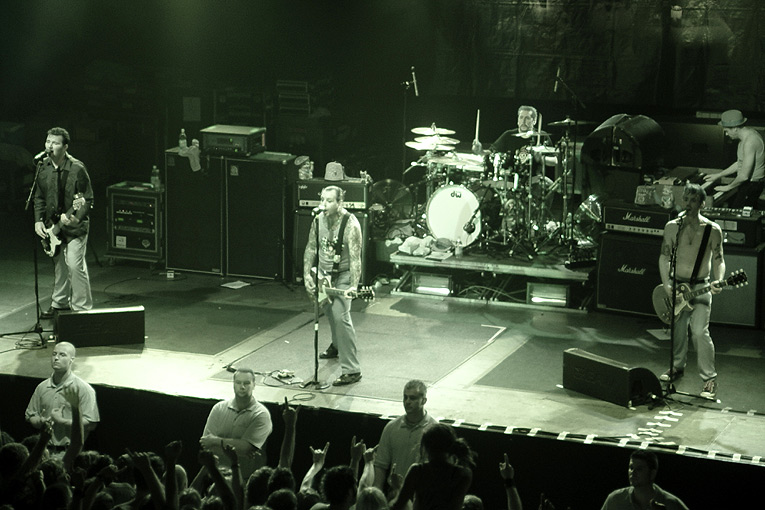
- Social Distortion performing in Germany, 2005
- Stylistic origins: Punk rock; new wave; roots rock; folk; country; honky-tonk; country rock
- Cultural origins: Late 1970s, United Kingdom; Early 1980s, Southern California
- Derivative forms: Alternative country

Other topics
- Alt country; folk punk; garage rock; psychobilly; punk blues; roots rock; timeline of punk rock

Cowpunk (or country punk) is a subgenre of country music and punk rock that began in the United Kingdom and Southern California in the late 1970s and early 1980s. It combines punk rock or new wave with country, folk, and blues in its sound, lyrical subject matter, attitude, and style. Examples include Social Distortion, the Gun Club, the Long Ryders, Dash Rip Rock, DOROTHY, Violent Femmes, the Blasters, Mojo Nixon, Meat Puppets, the Beat Farmers, Rubber Rodeo, Rank and File, and Jason and the Scorchers. Many of the musicians in this scene subsequently became associated with alternative country, roots rock or Americana.

== Etymology and characteristics ==
The term "cowpunk" is first attested in 1979, as a blend of "cowboy" and "punk". The term "country punk" has been proposed as an equivalent term. Both terms are sometimes hyphenated, especially in late 1970s or early 1980s sources (e.g., cow-punk or country-punk).

In 1984, Robert Palmer wrote in the New York Times on the emerging aesthetic acknowledged "cowpunk" as one of several catch-all terms critics were using to categorize the country-influenced music of otherwise unrelated punk and new wave bands. The article briefly summarized the music's history, at least in the United States, saying that in the early 1980s, several punk and new wave bands had begun collecting classic country records, and soon thereafter began performing high-tempo cover versions of their favorite songs, and that new bands had also formed around the idea. By 1984, there were dozens of bands in both the U.S. and England "personalizing country music and making it palatable for the MTV Generation."

A New York Times writer stated that one issue with the "cowpunk" term was that "...no single term really describes the music of all these bands." Another author called the term "cowpunk" a critic-coined "misnomer" in 1985. A 2018 article looking back at the 1980s trends states that the "...diversity of styles beyond punk proper" in cowpunk, "...for some, made the category...suspect, [or] at least misleading."

== History ==
=== Precursors ===
The first cowpunk bands in the late 1970s "...were inspired not by mainstream country but classic country, a more authentic-sounding music but also historically distant enough to be non-mainstream by default..." There were precedents for blending country and related genres with rock or other styles. For example, all through the 1970s, country rock and southern rock were popular. However, by the early 1980s, the outlaw country trend had "worn out its welcome". Another factor that made country music unappealing to many youth in the early 1980s was that it was perceived as being on the "wrong side" in the "culture war", as country music was associated with conservative political values and highly-produced commercial music.

Don McLeese said the ways that youth associated country music made them not realize that it had youthful, exuberant "hillbilly music" roots in earlier eras. Joey Camp says he was turned off country as a teen in the early 1980s because he mistakenly thought that the "...countrypolitan fare" then popular on commercial radio, such as "Islands in the Stream" by Kenny Rogers and Dolly Parton, "Queen of Hearts" by Juice Newton, and "Always on My Mind" by Willie Nelson" was the extent of country music.

Music writer Peter Doggett has stated that there has been a "difficult relationship between punk and country" since musicians from the two genres first encountered each other, but they did manage to meet and blend their styles. As well, some new wave bands "displayed blatant country influences".

Early cowpunk bands were more appealing to alternative, non-mainstream youth from the 1980s, as some cowpunk bands explored "queer" themes in their lyrics, or identified or appeared in an androgynous manner. By the early 1980s, punk audiences did come to appreciate a blend of punk and rockabilly, when the new subgenre of psychobilly emerged, with bands such as the Cramps.

=== 1970s ===
In 1978, Rosie Flores led Rosie and the Screamers, a band that one author calls a "cow-punk" group. T. Tex Edwards, the singer for Dallas area punk band the Nervebreakers, which opened for the Ramones in 1977 and the Sex Pistols on their 1978 US Tour, went on to cowpunk and other country-influenced groups. After The Nervebreakers, influenced by the Cramps and Gun Club he started Tex & The Saddletramps.

=== 1980s ===
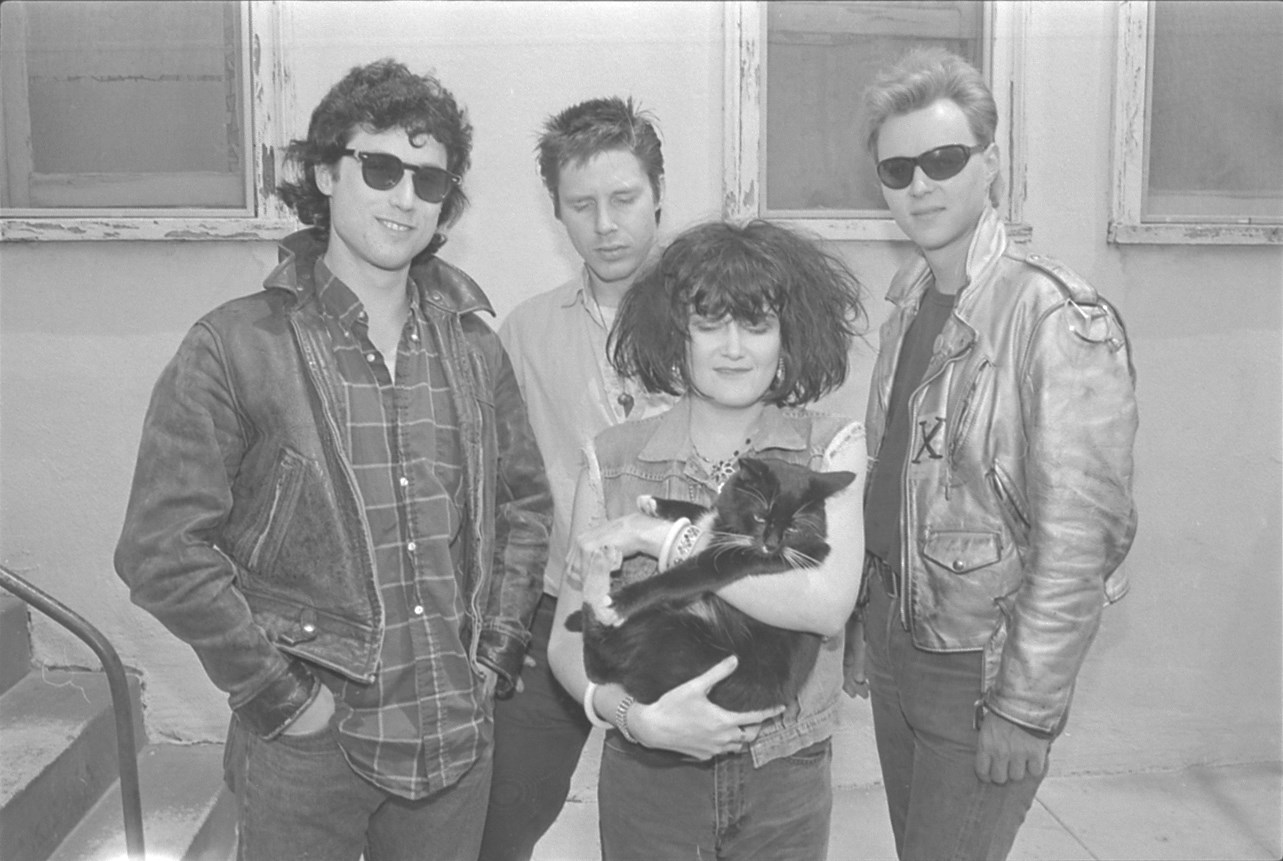
X in 1980

In the early 1980s, punk groups such as L.A. band X, "...began to lean toward the twangy side, providing a subgenre that became known as cowpunk". The L.A. cowpunk bands like X tended to be as intentionally sloppy, against "slick" production values, and anti-commercial as the punk genre they had "morphed" from, often from "blitzkrieg bands" (for example, the Dils became cowpunk band Rank and File). In the 1980s, Rosie Flores left the Screamers and joined a cowpunk all-female band called Screamin' Sirens.

UK groups include the country-tinged pop band Boothill Foot Tappers and the tongue-in-cheek new wave outfit Yip Yip Coyote.

There are a number of U.S. bands: X, the Blasters, Meat Puppets, the Beat Farmers, Rubber Rodeo (which "juxtaposed countrypolitan elements and more conventional rock postures" in homage to "a pop-culture west rather than a geographic or historic one"), Rank and File (playing "an updated version of 1960s country-rock"), Jason and the Scorchers (with "authentically deep country roots"), Tex & the Horseheads, Blood on the Saddle 1984), Dash Rip Rock, Drivin' n Cryin', Fetchin Bones (from North Carolina), the Rave-Ups, Concrete Blonde, Great Plains (from Ohio), and Violent Femmes (at that time incorporating "mountain banjo, wheezing saxophones, scraping fiddle, twanging jew's harp, and ragged vocal choruses").

The Del-Lords formed in New York City in 1982, founded by the Dictators' guitarist Scott Kempner. The band's cowpunk sound combined elements of 1960s garage rock with country, blues and folk influences. They were one of the early originators of urban roots-rock. The band members were Scott Kempner, Manny Caiati, Eric Ambel and Frank Funaro.

Nine Pound Hammer is an American hardcore-cowpunk band formed in 1985 by vocalist Scott Luallen and guitarist Blaine Cartwright in their hometown of Owensboro, Kentucky. They were one of the first rural hardcore punk bands to incorporate rural blue collar motifs into the hardcore sound. Their lyrics (suggestive of outlaw country) featured themes such as alcoholism, rural poverty, and violence. In contrast, most of the urban, experimental cowpunk bands of 1970s/80s Los Angeles and the UK were roots rock, folk rock or New Wave bands, and they incorporated country music instruments and influences as a secondary (sometimes temporary) aspect of their sound.

In Social Distortion's album Prison Bound (1986–1988), the band makes a notable style change, exploring a country/western flavor . This record marks the start of the band's entrance into a cowpunk style. Country legend Johnny Cash and a honky tonk style became more prominent influences and there are references to Cash.

Lone Justice is a Los Angeles cowpunk band. SPIN magazine also named Long Ryders, Danny & Dusty, and Mekons as from the genre.

In Canada, prairies singer k.d. lang was called a "Canadian Cowpunk" in the 20 June 1985 issue of Rolling Stone. In the late 1980s, Edmonton-based Jr. Gone Wild has been called a "[c]risp, cheerfully honest" example of ,"...that "cowpunk" thing, sure — but really it's just the sugary-yet-direct indie rock of its time, poppy and looking back more than a little at the Gram Parsons side of the Byrds."

In 1987, the independent film Border Radio was associated with the cowpunk scene. The film, which is directed by Allison Anders, Dean Lent and Kurt Voss, is about two musicians and a roadie who haven't been paid who rob money from a club and one of whom flees to Mexico leaving his wife and daughter behind. It features music from the Flesh Eaters, Green on Red, John Doe, the Divine Horsemen, X, and the Blasters.

Cowpunk made its mark on mainstream country radio for a brief period from 1987-1990 with the emergence of super-duo Foster & Lloyd. The video for their debut single Crazy Over You received extensive airplay on CMT. The radio single peaked at #4 on Billboard and #1 on the now defunct Radio & Records chart.

By the late 1980s, high-end firms tried to capitalize on the cowpunk trend by selling expensive country western-themed merchandise. In 1989, The Washington Post reported that "...the biggest trend, especially at NM [Neimen-Marcus], is Madison Avenue cowpunk—costumes for trust-fund Cowboy Junkies ranging from hand-stenciled "Indian" deerskin jackets by Ralph Lauren for her ($2,200) to western-style yoke-front tuxedos ($1,975) that are the visual equivalent of a Lonesome Strangers song. There's a Busch commercial/"Young Riders" yellow duster in lambskin ($1,200) that quite outshines the honest canvas one from J. Peterman ($184)."

=== 1990s ===
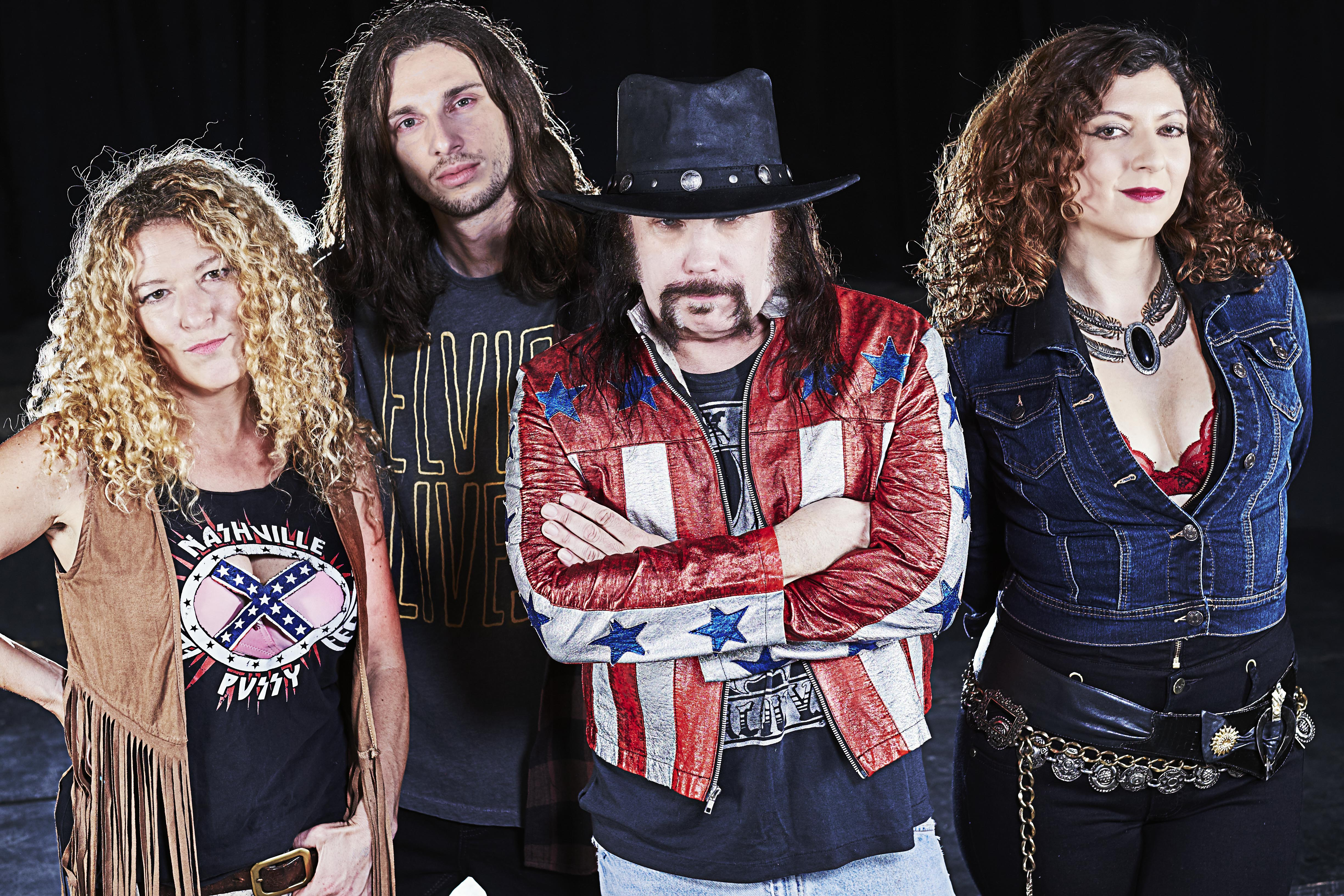
Nashville Pussy incorporates cowpunk into their sound.

In 1990, SPIN magazine called the Dead Milkmen a cowpunk band, also noting that they have been called "scruff rock". In 1991, a reviewer called the Vandals a cowpunk band, while noting that by this year, the band was moving away from cowpunk towards a mix of metal with a touch of pop.

Dan Baird is an American singer-songwriter, musician and producer best known as the lead singer and rhythm guitarist from the chart-topping 1980s rock band the Georgia Satellites, who is often credited as one of the pioneers in cowpunk and alt-country music, as his songs combine elements of rock music, country music, outlaw country, and punk rock.

Goober & the Peas were a cowpunk band from Detroit, Michigan, active from 1990 to 1995, known for blending odd humor to a darker side of country music and indie rock (and for Jack White of the White Stripes having served as drummer for a period). The band was known for their frenetic live shows.

The Damn Band is the cowpunk-influenced backing band of Hank Williams III. It was formed in 1995 and consists of acoustic guitar (played by Williams), steel guitar, fiddle, bass, drums, electric guitar and banjo.

Steve Kidwiller, the former guitarist of punk rock band NOFX (on their 1989 and 1991 records) subsequently joined cowpunk band Speedbuggy USA. in 1994.

Following the breakup of Nine Pound Hammer in 1997, guitarist Blaine Cartwright formed Nashville Pussy, a Grammy-Nominated American rock & roll band from Atlanta, Georgia that has been called a mix of cowpunk, psychobilly, Southern rock, and hard rock, as well as "sleaze rock".

The American rock and roll band Supersuckers' fourth studio album, Must've Been High (1997) was called their first cowpunk album. It was released on 25 March 1997, via Sub Pop.

=== 2000s to present ===
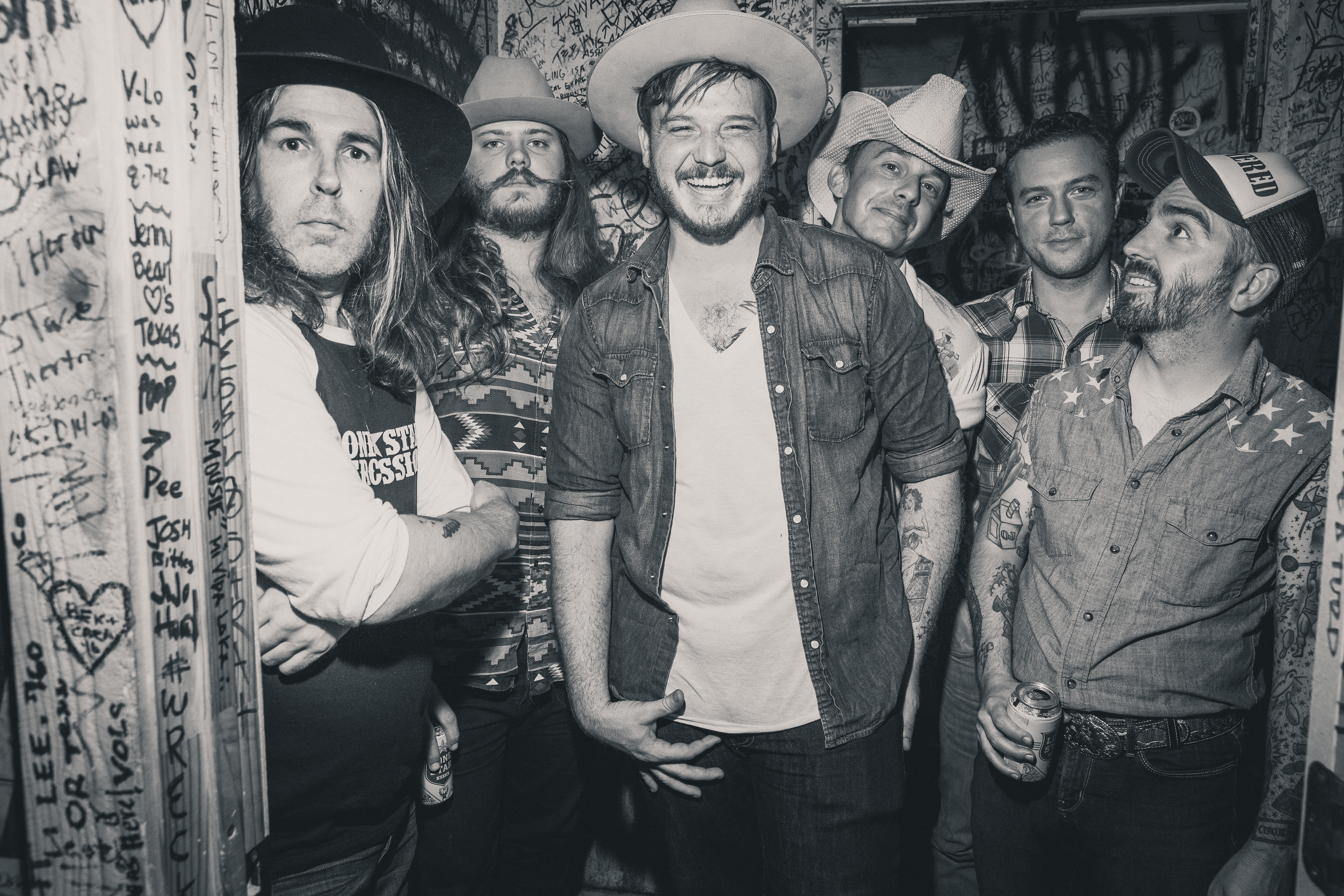
The Vandoliers in 2016

In the 2000s, Those Darlins were called a cowpunk act.

Black Stone Cherry were formed in 2001 by Chris Robertson and John Fred Young, the son of Richard Young of the Kentucky Headhunters. Their unique musical style combines southern rock with heavy metal and grunge.

Vandoliers, a band formed in 2015 by Jenni Rose, following the dissolution of her Fort Worth-based punk trio The Phuss. She met members from The Marty Stuart Show and learned more about the similarities between punk and country. The band's album The Native is noted for ushering in a cowpunk resurgence.

In the 2010s, both Bloodshot Records artists Lydia Loveless and Sarah Shook's band were classified country-punk or cowpunk.

Other cowpunk groups of the 2000s and 2010s included Old Crow Medicine Show, Brazilian Matanza, Those Darlins, the Waco Brothers, 7 Shot Screamers, and Blackfoot. Danish hellbilly group Volbeat specialise in heavy metal infused covers of classic country songs.

== Fashion and aesthetic ==
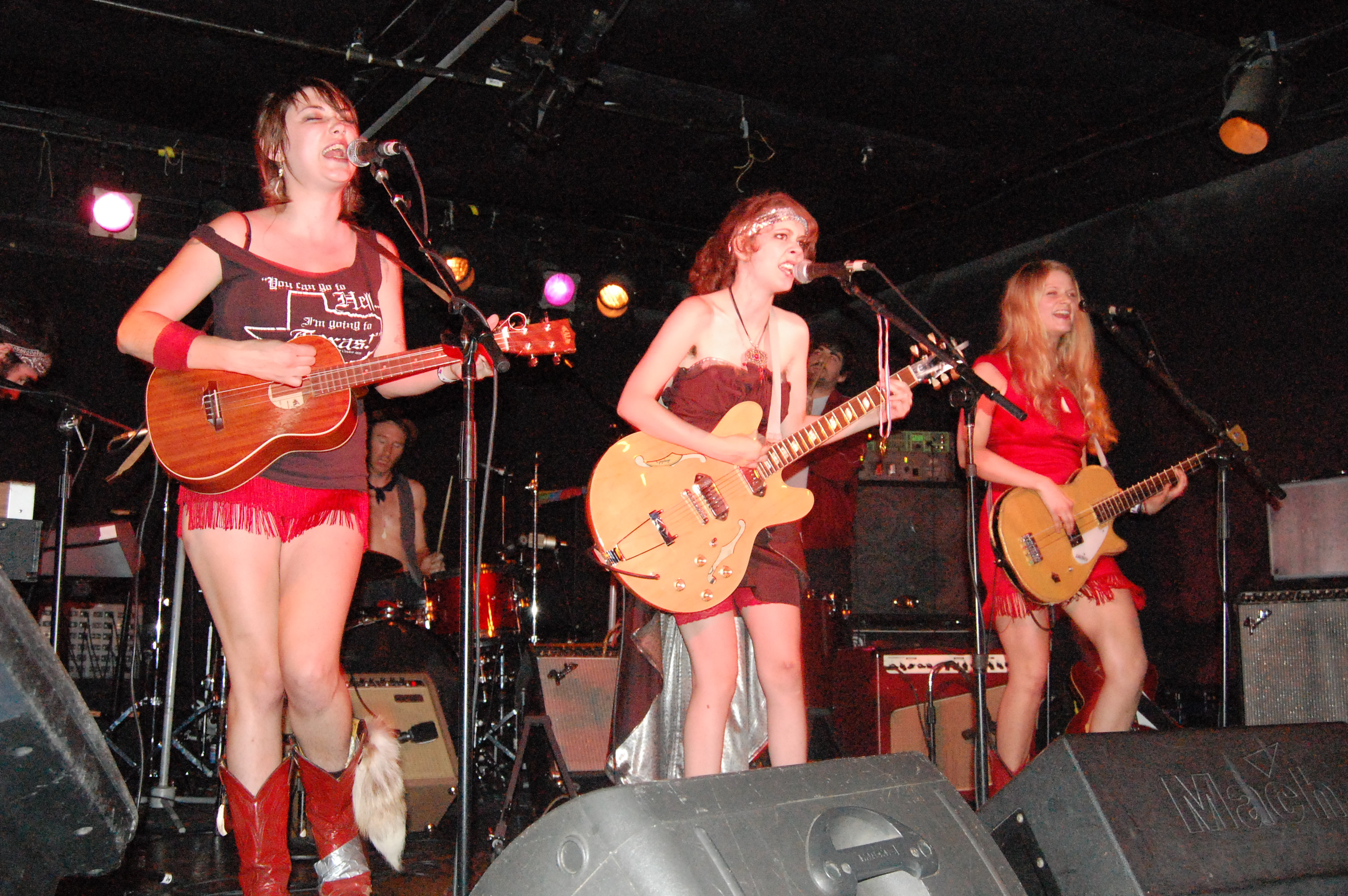
Cowpunk artists Those Darlins

The cowpunk clothing style is a stereotypical U.S. rural, working class, western wear form of dress. Cowpunks may wear anything from a vintage western wear look, including checked shirts, bib overalls, worn jeans, and cowboy boots, to a more industrial look with wifebeater shirts, trucker hats, and work boots. Women's hair follows no single style, but men can have anything from a crew cut to long hair, or the exaggerated quiff pompadour hairstyle. Facial hair is also common.

== See also ==
- Alternative country
- Outlaw country
- Psychobilly
- Punk blues

== Bibliography ==
- Einarson, John. Desperados: The Roots of Country Rock. New York: Cooper Square Press, 2001
- Haslam, Gerald W. Workin' Man Blues: Country Music in California. Berkeley: University of California Press, 1999
- Wolff, Kurt. The Rough Guide to Country Music. London: Rough Guides, 2000.
- Hinton, Brian. "South By South West: A Road Map To Alternative Country" Sanctuary 2003
