= Duda Wendling =

Brazilian actress (born 2006)

- Born: Maria Eduarda Wendling Gomes; 19 June 2006 (age 19); Rio de Janeiro, Brazil
- Occupation: Actress
- Years active: 2012–present
- Mother: Camila Wendling

Duda Wendling (born 19 June 2006) is a Brazilian actress. She began her career as an actress in 2012, known for productions such as Avenida Brasil, Mato Sem Cachorro, Valentins and Cúmplices de um Resgate, and also for participating in and being crowned runner-up in the reality show A Fazenda 17 in 2025.

== Career ==
Duda began her acting career in 2012, playing Clarinha in the soap opera Avenida Brasil on Rede Globo. In 2013 she acted alongside Bruno Gagliasso in the film Mato Sem Cachorro. In 2015 acted in the soap opera Cúmplices de um Resgate of SBT, in 2017 acted in the film Poesias Para Gael of Telemilênio Brasil, in 2018 she was part of the cast of Super Chefinhos of Rede Globo, in 2019 she starred in the series Valentins of TV Cultura and acted in Rede Globo's soap opera Verão 90. In 2021, she was part of the series Os Veganitos, shown on Amazon Prime Video. Between 2022 and 2024, she was part of the cast of the series Stupid Wife. Also in 2024, she returned to acting in feature films when she participated in the main cast of the film Girassol Scholl, also shown on Amazon Prime Video. In 2025, the actress was revealed as one of the participants in the reality show A Fazenda 17, shown on Record TV., where she finished as runner-up from the competition.

== Personal life ==
In 2025, she began an affair with actor Matheus Martins and also with fighter Luiz Mesquita, meeting them on the reality show A Fazenda 17.

== Filmography ==
=== Television ===
| Year | Title | Character | Notes |
|---|---|---|---|
| 2012 | Avenida Brasil | Clara Pereira Oliveira (Clarinha) | |
| 2013–2014 | Joia Rara | Pérola Fonseca Hauser | |
| 2015–2016 | Cúmplices de um Resgate | Dóris Jardim | Up to chapter 110 |
| 2017–2019 | Valentins | Lila Valentim | |
| 2018 | Super Chefinhos | Contestant (3rd place) | Season 4 |
| 2019 | Verão 90 | Isadora Ferreira Lima Mendes | |
| 2021 | Os Veganitos | Herself | |
| 2022–2024 | Stupid Wife | Sara Campos | |
| 2025 | A Fazenda | Participant (Runner-up) | Season 17 |

=== Movies ===
| Year | Title | Character |
|---|---|---|
| 2013 | Mato Sem Cachorro | Lara |
| 2017 | Poesias Para Gael | Eline Kid |
| 2024 | Girassol School | Clara |
