= NGT São Paulo =

NGT São Paulo (ZYQ 840)
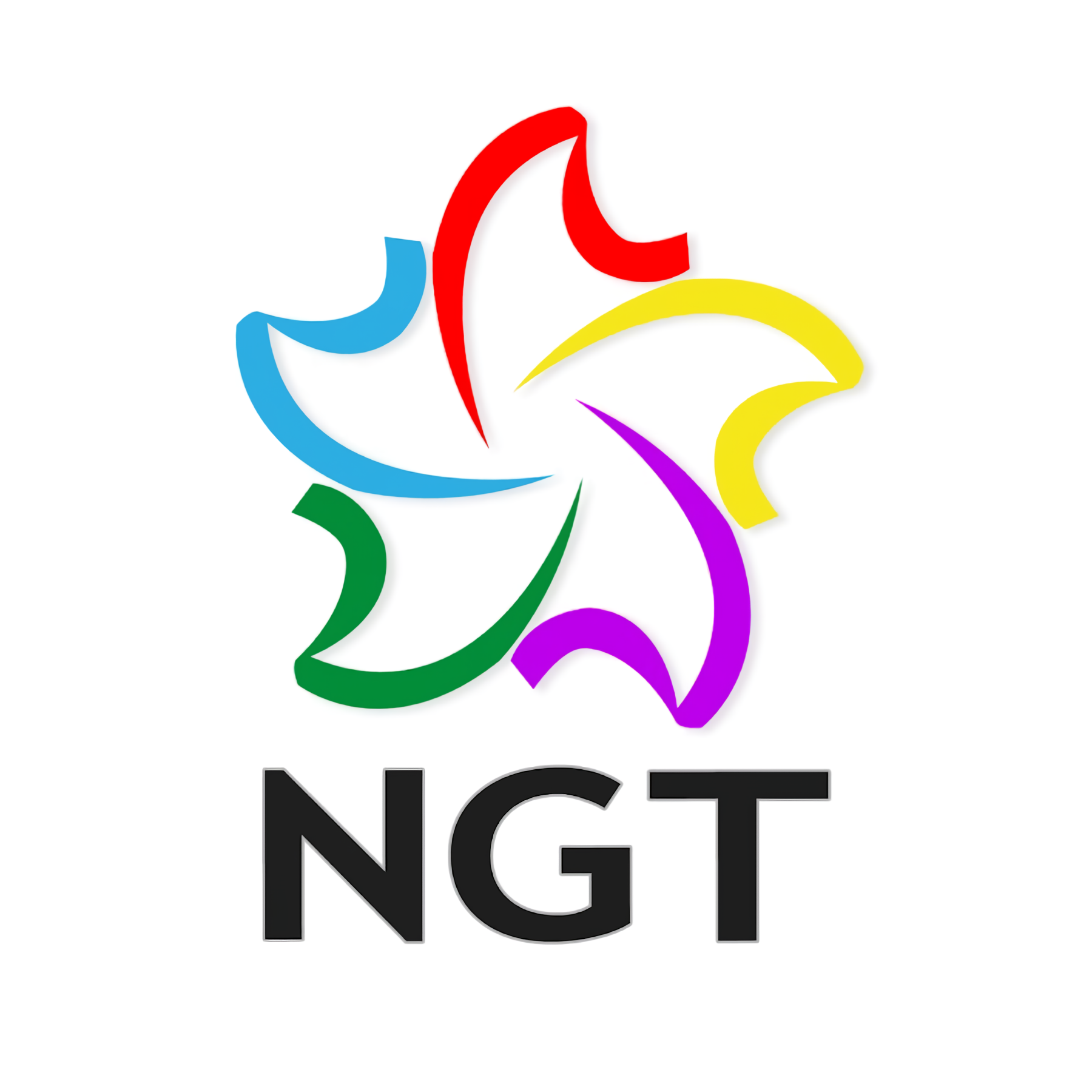
- Osasco, São Paulo; Brazil
- Channels: Digital: 16 (UHF); Virtual: 48

Ownership
- Owner: Fundação de Fatima; (RBT - Rede Brasil Total Serviços de Comunicação Ltda.)
- Sister stations: NGT Rio de Janeiro

History
- First air date: 8 October 2003
- Former call signs: ZYB 895
- Former channel numbers: Analog: 48 (UHF, 2003-2017); Digital: 47 (UHF, 2008-2017)

Technical information
- Licensing authority: ANATEL
- ERP: 29.0162 kW
- Transmitter coordinates: 23°33′57″S 46°38′58″W

Links
- Public license information: Profile
- Website: redengt.com.br

NGT São Paulo is a Brazilian television station based in Osasco, a city in the São Paulo metropolitan area. It operates on virtual channel 48 (UHF channel 16) and is one of two main stations in the Nova Geração de Televisão ("New Generation of Television") network. It was founded on 8 October 2003 and transmits its signal from the Cásper Líbero Tower.

== History ==
In the early 2000s, Manoel Antônio Bernardes Costa acquired educational television concessions from two foundations, one in Osasco and the other in Rio de Janeiro. These stations were launched in 2003 as the Nova Geração de Televisão network, with a studio facility known as Espaço 48 ("Space 48", after the analog channel number) also being fitted out. A range of alternative programming was promised.

In 2020, it was reported that the network had put itself up for sale.

== Digital signal ==
| Subchannel | Resolution | Programming |
|---|---|---|
| 48.1 | 1080i | NGT |

Based on the federal decree of transition of Brazilian TV broadcasters from analogue to digital, NGT São Paulo, as well as the other broadcasters of the São Paulo Metropolitan Region, ceased broadcasting on channel 48 UHF on March 29, 2017, following the official schedule of ANATEL.
