= Telemilênio =

Telemilênio Brasil
- Formation: 2005; 21 years ago
- Founders: Victor Neves
- Type: cinema producer
- Location: Nova Friburgo, Rio de Janeiro
- Website: www.telemilenio.com.br

Telemilêmio Brasil is a Brazilian producer of films and TV series, having already produced hits such as "Poesias Para Gael", Invisibilia and Depois da Chuva (After The Rain). Often called a producer of LGBT+ content due to the large number of productions for this audience, it is also a producer of general content. productions, Telemilênio has already produced dramaturgy for broadcasters such as TV Cultura, NGT, among others.

== History ==
The production company of films and series Telemilênio was created in 2005, by the actor and producer Victor Neves, in Nova Friburgo in Rio de Janeiro. In 2012, Telemilênio closed a partnership with TV Cultura and started showing its productions to the whole of Brazil through CineBrasilTV. In 2015, the Perigosos series was shown on cable TV in Brazil, via NGT. In 2017, Telemilênio launched the film "Poesias Para Gael", one of the greatest successes of Brazilian cinema in Brazil, in 2020 the plot was made available for free on YouTube, and has already surpassed the mark of 4 million views.

In addition to productions aimed at the LGBT + public, Telemilênio has already produced dramaturgy for major national televisions such as Rede Record, SBT and TV Cultura. In 2020, Telemilênio became the broadcaster of the pop culture awards BreakTudo Awards.

The cast of the producer Telemilênio has more than 80 actors, among well-known names are Paloma Bernardi, Brenno Leone, Victor Neves e Natalie Sith, Flavio Leimig, Jonas Freze, Magda Rezende, Valma Christina and Malu Falangola .

=== Television ===
Year	Title	Network
2013	Depois da Chuva	CineBrasilTV
2014	Invisibilia	CineBrasilTV
2015	Alquimia	NGT
2020	Vidas Cruzadas	YouTube
2020–Present	Até Te Encontrar	Telemilênio
2016	Freiheit	CineBrasilTV
2017 - 2020	Poesias Para Gael	CineBrasilTV
2020–present	Namorando Com A Sogra	Telemilênio
2020	Para Sempre Nós	Telemilênio
2018	Ponto Fraco	NGT
2013	Meu Anjo	CineBrasilTV
2020	BreakTudo Awards	Telemilênio and BreakTudo
2014	Suburbanda	Telemilênio

== Awards and nominations ==
=== Rio Webfest ===
Year	Nominee / work	Award	Result
Rio Webfest 2021	Vidas Cruzadas	Incentive to Brazilian Digital Production	Nominated
Rio Webfest 2021	Namorando a Sogra	Best Performance	Nominated
Rio Webfest 2021	Vidas Cruzadas	RIOWF Voto Popular	Nominated

=== Lima Webfest ===
Year	Nominee / work	Award	Result
Lima Webfest 2021	Poesias Para Gael	Brazilian Digital Production	Nominated
Lima Webfest 2021	Namorando A Sogra	Brazilian Production	Nominated
