= Alli Willow =

Brazilian actress

Alli Willow is a Brazilian French and American actress born in November 1993. Much of Willow's work is in Brazilian film and television. Her film credits include Bacurau and Three Summers. Her television credits include The Chosen One, Girls from Ipanema and Dear Death.

Willow studied acting at the Lee Strasberg Theatre and Film Institute in New York City.
