= Raphael Draccon =

Brazilian writer

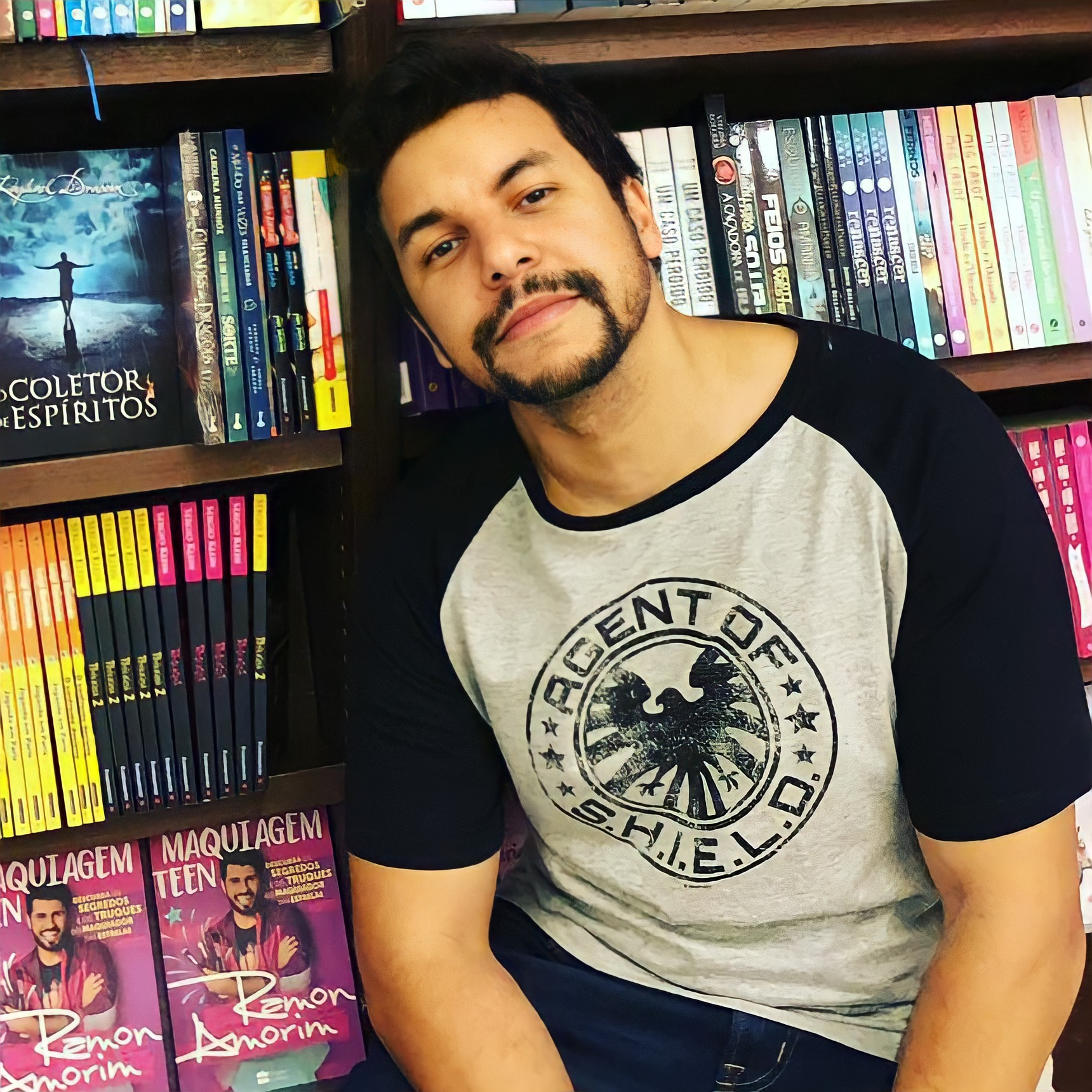
- Raphael Draccon in 2019
- Born: Raphael Albuquerque Pereira; June 15, 1981 (age 45); Rio de Janeiro, Rio de Janeiro, Brazil
- Occupations: Writer; Screenwriter; Executive Producer; Publisher
- Known for: Dragons of Ether tetralogy Silver Cords – Rebuilding Sandman; Spirits of Ice; Cemeteries of Dragons trilogy Invisible City (TV series); The Chosen One (TV series)
- Spouse: Carolina Munhóz
- Children: 1

Raphael Draccon Albuquerque is a Brazilian-American fantasy writer and screenwriter, awarded by the American Screenwriters Association. He is considered one of the most influential and bestselling fiction writers in Brazil.

== Literary career ==
Draccon is the author of the bestselling high fantasy trilogy Dragons of Ether (originally Dragões de Éter), first published in Brazil and Portugal between 2009 and 2013, in which he retells classic fairy tales in a contemporary style. The trilogy spent five consecutive years at #1 on Submarino, Brazil's largest book marketplace before Amazon's arrival in the country, and has sold over one million copies across Brazil, Portugal, and Mexico.

In 2013, the series reached fourth place on the bestseller list in Mexico through Random House Mondadori. He also published the dark fantasy novel Spirits of Ice in Brazil and Portugal, as well as Silver Cords – Rebuilding Sandman, the trilogy Ranger Legacy, and The Collector of Spirits, among other works.

In total, he has published 13 novels.

Draccon was responsible for bringing George R. R. Martin's A Song of Ice and Fire series to Brazil, advocating for its publication at Leya before the HBO adaptation made it a global phenomenon. Following its success, Leya gave him his own editorial imprint, Fantasy – Casa da Palavra, which he ran from 2013 to 2015. He later moved to Editora Rocco, the Brazilian publisher of Harry Potter, Eragon, and The Hunger Games, in what was the largest Brazilian author deal in Rocco's history at the time.

Paulo Coelho cited him at the Frankfurt Book Fair as a writer who should represent Brazil internationally.

== Television career ==
In 2015, Draccon joined the writing team at Rede Globo, contributing to the series Supermax, which was the first American-style writers' room in the network's history. Since 2015, Draccon has been based in Los Angeles, California, where he lives with his wife, the writer and screenwriter Carolina Munhóz.

He was responsible for two Netflix Original series: The Chosen One, for which he served as writer and co-executive producer across both seasons, and for the original development of Invisible City, which ranked in the Top 10 in 60 countries. He has also developed projects with WarnerMedia, HBO Max, DC Comics, Marvel Entertainment, Miramax, and Starz.

== Comics ==
In 2023, Draccon and Munhóz began writing for comics, contributing to titles at both DC Comics and Marvel Comics, working with characters such as Fire & Ice from the Justice League International, and Gambit and Rogue from the X-Men.

== Other ==
In 2018, author Marie Lu honored Draccon and Munhóz by naming an official DC Comics character after them: Detective Carolina Draccon, in the novel Batman: Nightwalker.

In June 2019, Draccon participated in the Fortnite Summer Block Party Creative Showdown, held at The Forum in Inglewood, California, alongside celebrities including Brendon Urie of Panic! at the Disco, Chandler Riggs, and Jordan Fisher.

Brazilian rapper Emicida cited him by name in the song "8", from the album Sobre Crianças, Quadris, Pesadelos e Lições de Casa.

== Published works ==
- Dragons of Ether – WitchHunter (2007) – Brazil (Leya), Portugal (Dom Quixote) and Mexico (Random House Mondadori).
- Dragons of Ether – SnowHearts (2009) – Brazil (Leya), Portugal (Dom Quixote) and Mexico (Random House Mondadori).
- Dragons of Ether – RainCircles (2010) – Brazil (Leya), Portugal (Dom Quixote) and Mexico (Random House Mondadori).
- Silver Cords – Rebuilding Sandman (2012) – Brazil (Leya)
- Spirits of Ice (2012) – Brazil (Leya)
- Cemeteries of Dragons – Ranger Legacy I (2014) – Brazil (Rocco)
- Cities of Dragons – Ranger Legacy II (2015) – Brazil (Rocco)
- Worlds of Dragons – Ranger Legacy III (2016) – Brazil (Rocco)
- Colector of Spirits (2016) – Brazil (Rocco)
- Dragons of Ether – MistStandards (2020) – Brazil (Editora Melhoramentos).

== TV series ==
- Supermax (2016) – Rede Globo
- The Chosen One (2019) – Netflix
- Invisible City (2020) – Netflix
