= The Stripper (TV series) =

Brazilian web series

- English: The Stripper
- Genre: drama
- Created by: Priscilla Pugliese
- Written by: Evelin Silva; Priscilla Pugliese
- Directed by: Nadia Bambirra
- Starring: Natalie Smith; Priscilla Pugliese; Rodrigo Tardelli; Maria Clara El-Bainy; Rodrigo Ferraro; Jessica Cores
- Country of origin: Brazil
- Original language: Portuguese
- No. of seasons: 1
- No. of episodes: 10

Production
- Running time: 30–39 minutes
- Production company: Ponto Ação Produções

Original release
- Network: Ponto Ação
- Release: 15 October 2019 – 23 April 2020

The Stripper is a Brazilian LGBTQ + drama web series, based on the short story of the same name by author Evelin Silva. Successful in Brazil, the series has more than 30 million views on YouTube. The series stars Natalie Smith, Priscilla Pugliese and Rodrigo Tardelli and produced by Brazilian production company Ponto Ação. The story The Stripper has over 18 million views on Wattpad. The series was considered a success.

== Synopsis ==
Camila begins to experience financial difficulties so she has the opportunity to work at a nightclub called Imperium as Karla, the stripper. During the day, however, she stills works as an assistant and her new boss, the powerful and mysterious Lauren, can't know Camila is actually also Karla, the stripper she has become obsessed with.

== Cast ==
- Natalie Smith as Karla/Camila
- Priscilla Pugliese as Lauren
- Maria Clara El-Bainy as Dinah
- Nathália Diório as Allyson
- Luiza César (Veronica)
- Rodrigo Tardelli (Wesley)
- Lorena Antunes (Kellen)
- Rodrigo Ferraro (Austin)
- Valéria Bohm (Candence)
- Jessica Córes (Normani)
- Madu de Paoli (Sofia)
- Camilla Rocha (Taylor)
- Thaisa Lima (Alexa)
- Tiago Deam (Leandro)
- Tom Reis (Troy)
- Vitor Zenezi (Alfred)

=== Special guests ===
- Lu Grimaldi (Germana)
- Nadia Bambirra (Clara)
- Valéria Alencar (Sinu)
- Alexandre Mello (Michael)
- João Vitti (Alejandro)
- Jorge Jeronymo (Richard)

== Awards and nominations ==
| Year | Award | Category | Nominated | Result | Ref. |
|---|---|---|---|---|---|
| 2020 | NYC WEB FEST | Melhor Série em Língua Estrangeira | The Stripper | Nominated | |
| 2019 | Fest Cine Pedra Azul | Melhor Série | The Stripper | Won | |
