= Poesias Para Gael =

2017 film by Victor Marinho

- Directed by: Victor Marinho, Lucas Serra, Leonardo Porto
- Produced by: Victor Neves
- Starring: Victor Neves e Flávio Leimig
- Production company: Telemilênio Brasil
- Release date: 13 November 2017
- Running time: 1 hour and 46 minutes
- Country: Brazil
- Language: Portuguese

Poesias Para Gael (transl. Poetry for Gael) is a 2017 Brazilian LGBT drama film, produced by Telemilênio Brasil.

== Plot ==
Gael is gay and is being bullied at school. Eline is in love with him but as he does not respond to her, she starts to hate him and to interfere in his life. She then decides to devise a plan to make Gael suffer - she puts it to Hugo who is his friend to abandon Gael, but what she did not expect was that the two of them would be together. So the villain decides to take revenge on both of them. The version made available for free on the production channel Telemilênio on YouTube, has more than 4 million views.

== Cast ==
- Victor Neves as Gael
- Flávio Leimig as Hugo
- Natalie Smith as Eline
- Magda Resende as Helena
- Luciano Santos as Renato
- Valma Christina as Virginia Valquíria
- Ian Tavares as Paulo
- Allexandre Colman as Gael kid
- Duda Wendling as Eline kid
- Rafael Sun as Hugo kid
- Priscila Cardoso as Josiane
- Arthur Gregory as Miguel
- Joel Viana as Pai de Gael
- Jonas Freze as Rafael
