= Jessica Córes =

Brazilian actress

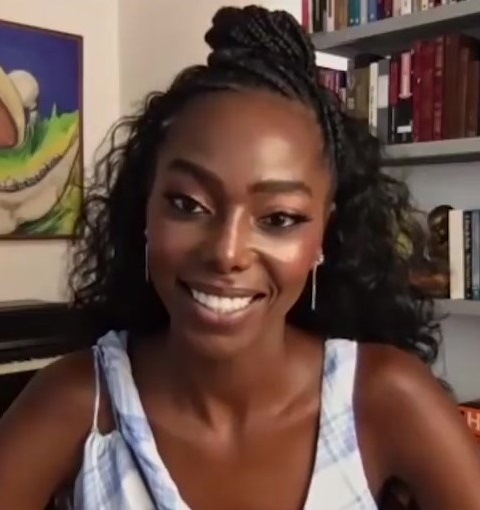
- Córes in February 2021
- Born: 19 October 1990 (age 35); Magé, Rio de Janeiro, Brazil
- Occupation: Actress
- Years active: 2015–present

Jessica Córes (born 19 October 1990) is a Brazilian actress. She is best known for her roles in Rede Globo's telenovela Verdades Secretas, and in Netflix's series Invisible City.

== Career ==
Jessica Cores debuted on TV in 2015, playing Lyris on Rede Globo's Verdades Secretas series. In 2017, she debuted on Portuguese TV in the series País Irmão of the channel RTP1. In 2019 she acted in the series The Stripper, in 2020 in the series "Brasil Imperial" of Amazon Prime and in 2021 she became protagonist of the series Invisible City of Netflix.

She was part of the cast of the film Mamonas Assassinas - O Impossível Não Existe, a biopic of the comic rock band, Mamonas Assassinas, premiering in Brazilian cinemas on December 28, 2023.

== Filmography ==
Television
Year	Title	Role	Notes
2015	Verdades Secretas	Lyris	
2017–18	País Irmão	Thaís	
2018	Mister Brau	Jéssica	Episode: "Refugiados"
2018	O Tempo Não Para	Idalina	Episode: "November 24th"
2019–20	The Stripper	Normani	
2020	Brasil Imperial	Ana do Congo	
2020	El Presidente	Maria	Episode: "Mentira"
2021	Invisible City	Camila /Iara	
2022	El Presidente	Maria	Episode: "I Live for FIFA"
2023	Fuzuê	Olívia de Castro	
2024	Biônicos	Maria	

Film
Year	Title	Role	Notes
2015	Só Assim Não Ficarei Sozinho	She	Short film
2023	Mamonas Assassinas - O Filme	Bárbara	
