= Invisible City (TV series) =

Brazilian fantasy television series

- Portuguese: Cidade Invisível
- Genre: Fantasy
- Created by: Carlos Saldanha
- Based on: an original idea by: Raphael Draccon; Carolina Munhóz
- Written by: Mirna Nogueira
- Directed by: Luis Carone; Júlia Pacheco Jordão
- Starring: Marco Pigossi; Alessandra Negrini; Fábio Lago; Jessica Córes; Jimmy London; Wesley Guimarães; Áurea Maranhão; Julia Konrad; Thaia Perez; Manu Dieguez; José Dumont
- Composers: Darren Solomon; Chris Jordão
- Country of origin: Brazil
- Original language: Portuguese
- No. of seasons: 2
- No. of episodes: 12

Production
- Executive producers: Renata Grynszpan; Caíto Ortiz; Maresa Pullman; Marco Anton; Francesco Civita; Beto Gauss; Carlos Saldanha
- Producers: Francesco Civita; Beto Gauss
- Production locations: Rio de Janeiro; Ubatuba, São Paulo; Belém; Igarapé-Açu
- Running time: 31–40 minutes
- Production companies: Prodigo Films; BottleCap Productions; Boipeba Filmes

Original release
- Network: Netflix
- Release: February 5, 2021 – March 22, 2023

Invisible City (Portuguese: Cidade Invisível) is a Brazilian fantasy television series created by Carlos Saldanha. It is based on a story co-developed by the screenwriters and best-selling authors Raphael Draccon and Carolina Munhóz. It stars Marco Pigossi as Eric, an environmental police officer who uncovers a hidden world of mythological entities from Brazilian folklore, as he searches for a connection between his wife's death and the mysterious appearance of a dead pink river dolphin on a beach in Rio de Janeiro.

The series premiered on Netflix on February 5, 2021. On March 2, 2021, almost a month after the first season was released, Netflix renewed the series for a second season that was released March 22, 2023. The show was canceled by Netflix and won't return for a third season.

== Plot summary ==
After finding a dead freshwater pink dolphin on a beach in Rio de Janeiro, detective Eric (Marco Pigossi) of the Environmental Police becomes involved in a murder investigation and discovers a world inhabited by mythical entities usually unnoticed by humans. As he investigates mysterious deaths that mirror that of his own wife, Gabriela (Julia Konrad), it leads him into a community of entities with magical powers. He eventually learns that he himself is a half-entity, and the river dolphin spirit Manaus (Victor Sparapane), whom he found dead as the story began, was his father.

Eric and his newfound compatriots learn that Dry Body, the escaped spirit of a dead, vanished anti-environmentalist evildoer, has possessed his daughter, Luna (Manu Dieguez). Dry Body is killing forest entities out of revenge, and is responsible for Gabriela's death. Seeking a stronger host, Dry Body transfers from Luna to Eric and attempts to resume his killing spree. But Eric sacrifices his own life, killing Dry Body, before the evil spirit can kill anyone else. In the final scene, Eric is mysteriously revived; and as the other entities carry him into the forest, it is implied he has been reborn as a full entity.

== Cast and characters ==
=== Main ===
- Marco Pigossi as Eric: An environmental detective who discovers the dead body of a pink dolphin and gets involved in finding that there is a connection to the murder of his wife.
- Alessandra Negrini as Inês / Cuca: The leader of the entities, a witch whose magical powers include being able to enter the minds of others and make them sleep by singing her self-named song.
- Fábio Lago as Iberê / Curupira: A homeless person who is actually an entity that guards and protects Brazilian forests, perceived by his backward feet, flaming head, and high whistles.
- Jessica Córes as Camila / Iara: An entity in the form of a beautiful mermaid who, with her singing voice, lures men to the waters to drown them.
- Jimmy London as Tutu / Tapire-iauara: An entity working for Inês who is capable of becoming a peccary or tapir.
- Wesley Guimarães as Isac / Saci: A one-legged mischievous entity who disappears and reappears at will.
- Áurea Maranhão as Márcia: Eric's investigative partner in the Environmental Police.
- Julia Konrad as Gabriela: Eric's wife and Luna's mother, whose death triggers the series' events.
- Thaia Perez as Januária: Eric's grandmother and Luna's great-grandmother.
- Manu Dieguez as Luna: Eric and Gabriela's young daughter.
- José Dumont as Ciço: A mysterious man living in the Cedar Forest who is aware to the existence of entities.
- Tomás de França as Bento: A young boy, with lycanthropic abilities, who befriends Luna and Eric (season 2).
- Letícia Spiller as Matinta Perera: An entity with abilities to grant wishes under the condition of giving her what she wants. She takes on the form of a white owl.
- Simone Spoladore as Clarice: A judge cursed by god to become A Mula sem cabeça for sleeping with the priest Father Venâncio.

=== Recurring ===
- Victor Sparapane as Manaus / Pink Dolphin: A seductive and captivating entity capable of transforming into a pink dolphin.
- Tainá Medina as Fabiana: João's pregnant ex-fiancée.
- Samuel de Assis as João: Fabiana's controlling ex-fiancé, who also happens to be Ciço's son.
- Rafael Sieg as Ivo: The head of the Environmental Police.
- Rubens Caribé as Afonso: The owner of a construction company that owns the Cedar Forest property, who is also the grandson of Antunes.
- Eduardo Chagas as Antunes / Dry Body: Afonso's grandfather and former owner of the Cedar Forest who, after being killed by Curupira, becomes an entity in the form of a vengeful, rotten spirit.
- Kauã Rodriguez as Baqueta: A street orphan who befriends Isac.

== Episodes ==
=== Series overview ===
Series overview
Season	Episodes	Originally released
1	7	February 5, 2021
2	5	March 22, 2023

=== Season 1 (2021) ===
No. overall	No. in season	Title	Directed by	Written by	Original release date
1	1	"Wish You Were Here"	Luis Carone	Mirna Nogueira	February 5, 2021
Devastated after his wife's death, an environmental officer is pulled into the mystery of a dead pink river dolphin washed ashore in Rio de Janeiro.
2	2	"There Is No Turning Back"	Luis Carone	Mirna Nogueira	February 5, 2021
Márcia and Eric examine a body found in the forest. Luna sets a trap, hoping to catch Saci. Inês uses her powers on Manaus.
3	3	"They Are Among Us"	Luis Carone	Mirna Nogueira	February 5, 2021
While Eric and Márcia investigate Inês, Ivo tries to shut the case. Ciço suggests to Eric that mythical creatures exist. Januária worries about Luna.
4	4	"Cuca Will Come After You"	Júlia Pacheco Jordão	Mirna Nogueira	February 5, 2021
In Cedar Forest, Ciço finds a disturbing site. Eric delves into his family's surprising connection to Manaus' case. Inês sends Tutu to do her bidding.
5	5	"You Will Not Believe Me"	Júlia Pacheco Jordão	Mirna Nogueira	February 5, 2021
With Luna behaving strangely, Januária fetches help from a healer. Unable to remember his encounter with Manaus, Eric gets a memory booster from Ciço.
6	6	"Childish Things"	Júlia Pacheco Jordão	Mirna Nogueira	February 5, 2021
Luna coaxes Saci to take her to Curupira. Ciço tells Afonso about Dry Body's curse. Eric and friends try to get to Luna before she finds her target.
7	7	"It's Much Bigger Than Us"	Luis Carone	Mirna Nogueira	February 5, 2021
Inês consoles a guilt-ridden Curupira, while Camila goes after Eric. In the forest, everyone gathers as Eric goes to extremes while battling the curse.

=== Season 2 (2023) ===
No. overall	No. in season	Title	Directed by	Written by	Original release date
8	1	"My Biggest Wish"	Luis Carone & Graciela Guarani	Antonio Arruda, Rodrigo Batista & Raphael	March 22, 2023
A murder takes place in the heart of the Amazon forest. Luna and Inês embark on a mission to find Eric. Meanwhile, Matinta Perê offers her services.
9	2	"I Won't Hurt You"	Graciela Guarani & Luis Carone	Antonio Arruda, Rodrigo Batista & Raphael	March 22, 2023
After removing Bento's curse, Eric uses his new powers to search for Luna. Débora finds a new key to Marangatu and sets up a very private auction.
10	3	"The Life We Always Dreamed Of"	Cassiano Prado & Graciela Guarani	Antonio Arruda, Rodrigo Batista & Raphael	March 22, 2023
Lazo and Luna become friends while locked up in captivity. Meanwhile, Eric, Clarice and Inês try to invade Débora's secret auction to set them free.
11	4	"Your Fear Is Your Poison"	Cassiano Prado	Antonio Arruda, Rodrigo Batista & Raphael Draccon	March 22, 2023
While Luna goes through a life-changing healing experience deep within the forest, Eric finds it hard to control his ever-growing powers.
12	5	"Marangatu: A Sacred Place"	Luciana Baptista, Luis Carone & Graciela Guaran	Antonio Arruda, Rodrigo Batista & Raphael Draccon	March 22, 2023
Débora confronts Castro after learning about her past. Meanwhile, Eric embarks on a painful journey to examine what is developing inside his chest.

== Reception ==
Invisible City received mixed to positive reviews. Netflix do not release the audience and review numbers. Nevertheless, according to What's on Netflix, Invisible City was the most popular TV show on Netflix in Brazil, and ranked top 10 in France, New Zealand and Spain on February 13, 2021. As stated by FlixPatrol, the TV show was placed among the top 10 most popular series in 12 countries on the same day.

== See also ==
- Brazilian mythology
