= A Fazenda 17 =

A Fazenda
- Season 17
- Hosted by: Adriane Galisteu
- No. of days: 96
- No. of contestants: 26
- Winner: Dudu Camargo
- Runner-up: Duda Wendling
- Companion show: A Fazenda Online
- No. of episodes: 95

Release
- Original network: Record
- Original release: 15 September – 18 December 2025

Season chronology
- ← Previous; Season 16 Next → Season 18

A Fazenda 17 (Note: also taglined as A Fazenda 17: Vai Invadir Sua Rotina. (English: The Farm 17: It Will Invade Your Routine.)) was the seventeenth season of the Brazilian reality television series A Fazenda, which premiered Monday, September 15, 2025, at 10:30 / 9:30 p.m. (BRT / AMT) on Record.

Adriane Galisteu returned for her fifth season as the main host, with Lucas Selfie and Márcia Fu also returning as the online host and correspondent and as the host of the comedic eviction-night segment, respectively.

== Contestants ==
The contestants of A Fazenda 17 were officially revealed during the season premiere on September 15, 2025. Duda Wendling had her entry postponed after being diagnosed with COVID-19 during the sequester period. After recovering, she entered the House on Day 2.

Contestant	Age	Background	Hometown	Entered	Exited	Status	Finish
Gabily	29	Singer	São João de Meriti	Day 1	Day 12	Eliminated 1st on September 25, 2025	26th
Renata Müller	41	Digital influencer	Belo Horizonte	Day 1	Day 19	Eliminated 2nd on October 2, 2025	25th
Guilherme "Gui" Boury	41	Actor	São Paulo	Day 1	Day 26	Eliminated 3rd on October 9, 2025	24th
Fernando Sampaio	47	Actor	Salvador	Day 1	Day 33	Eliminated 4th on October 16, 2025	23rd
Gaby Spanic	51	Actress	Ortiz, Venezuela	Day 1	Day 36	1st Ejected on October 19, 2025	22nd
Nizam Hayek	33	Digital influencer	São Paulo	Day 1	Day 40	Eliminated 5th on October 23, 2025	21st
Will Guimarães	33	Digital influencer	São Paulo	Day 1	Day 47	Eliminated 6th on October 30, 2025	20th
Martina Sanzi	32	Digital influencer	Porto Alegre	Day 1	Day 49	2nd Ejected on November 1, 2025	19th
Yoná Sousa	52	Lawyer	Teresina	Day 1	Day 54	Eliminated 7th on November 6, 2025	18th
Michelle Barros	46	Journalist	Maceió	Day 1	Day 59	Eliminated 8th on November 11, 2025	17th/16th
Shia Phoenix	36	Singer	Rio de Janeiro	Day 1	Day 59	Eliminated 9th on November 11, 2025	17th/16th
Matheus Martins	28	Model	Chapecó	Day 1	Day 61	Eliminated 10th on November 13, 2025	15th
Wallas Arrais	32	Singer	Iguatu	Day 1	Day 68	Eliminated 11th on November 20, 2025	14th
Maria Caporusso	32	Digital influencer	Ribeirão Preto	Day 1	Day 73	Eliminated 12th on November 25, 2025	13th
Créo Kellab	53	Actor	Juiz de Fora	Day 1	Day 74	3rd Ejected on November 26, 2025	12th
Rayane "Ray" Figliuzzi	27	Digital influencer	Areal	Day 1	Day 75	Eliminated 13th on November 27, 2025	11th
Tàmires Assîs	35	Dancer	Itacoatiara	Day 1	Day 82	Eliminated 14th on December 4, 2025	10th
Carol Lekker	28	Digital influencer	Juiz de Fora	Day 1	Day 89	4th Ejected on December 11, 2025	9th
Toninho Tornado	54	Comedian	Belo Horizonte	Day 1	Day 89	Eliminated 15th on December 11, 2025	8th
Kathy Maravilha	32	Dancer	Niterói	Day 1	Day 93	Eliminated 16th on December 15, 2025	7th
Walério Araújo	55	Stylist	Lajedo	Day 1	Day 94	Eliminated 17th on December 16, 2025	6th/5th
Luiz Otávio Mesquita	32	Multi-sport athlete	Foz do Iguaçu	Day 1	Day 94	Eliminated 18th on December 16, 2025	6th/5th
Fabiano Moraes	52	Advertiser	São Paulo	Day 1	Day 96	Fourth place on December 18, 2025	4th
Saory Cardoso	29	Digital influencer	Belo Horizonte	Day 1	Day 96	Third place on December 18, 2025	3rd
Duda Wendling	19	Actress	Rio de Janeiro	Day 2	Day 96	Runner-up on December 18, 2025	2nd
Dudu Camargo	27	TV host	São Paulo	Day 1	Day 96	Winner on December 18, 2025	1st

== The game ==
=== The Infiltrators ===
A total of 26 celebrities entered the House, including 24 official contestants and two secret infiltrators, Carol Lekker and Matheus Martins. Each infiltrator believed they were the only one and received secret missions to complete during the first week; failure would result in a R$5.000 deduction from the potential R$50.000 prize for each infiltrator. The contestants voted on who they thought the infiltrator was: if five or more guessed correctly, they would share the R$50.000; otherwise, the infiltrator would claim the prize.

Originally, the infiltrators were set to leave the House and serve as alternates, regardless of whether they were discovered. However, by public vote, Carol and Matheus were allowed to continue in A Fazenda 17 as official contestants after host Adriane Galisteu asked viewers whether they should be given the chance to stay in the game.

==== Missions ====
Infiltrator	Date	Mission	Result	Prize
Matheus	Day 3	The infiltrator must sing "Macarena" every time the microphone signal goes off.	Failed	R$45.000
Carol	Day 4	The infiltrator must convince three contestants to give her food from their plates.	Passed	R$50.000
Matheus	Day 5	The infiltrator must get a contestant to fry them an egg, then say it wasn't good.	Passed	R$45.000
Carol	Day 6	Tonight, the infiltrator must scream loudly after the bedroom lights go out.	Failed	R$45.000
Matheus	Day 10	The infiltrator must not be guessed by five or more in order to win the prize.	Failed	R$0
Carol	Day 10	The infiltrator must not be guessed by five or more in order to win the prize.	Failed	R$0

=== Fire challenge ===
Each week, contestants (determined by a random draw) compete in the Fire challenge to win the Lamp power. The Lamp power entitles the holder two flames (Orange and White), which may unleash good or bad consequences on the nomination process, with the Orange flame power defined by the public through the show's profile on R7 among two options.

Week		Players		Winner	Sent to the Stall	Consequences
1	Day 3	(none)			Dudu, Tàmires, Toninho, Yoná	All contestants in the Stall are banned from competing in the special immunity challenge on Day 5.
1	Day 8	Dudu		Martina	Dudu, Gabily, Kathy, Mesquita	Martina: The holder must choose a contestant whose every vote received counts as double → Fabiano.; Gabily: The holder must choose three of the immune contestants to be exempt from the vote → Mesquita, Walério, Will.
1	Day 8	Gabily		Martina	Dudu, Gabily, Kathy, Mesquita	Martina: The holder must choose a contestant whose every vote received counts as double → Fabiano.; Gabily: The holder must choose three of the immune contestants to be exempt from the vote → Mesquita, Walério, Will.
1	Day 8	Kathy		Martina	Dudu, Gabily, Kathy, Mesquita	Martina: The holder must choose a contestant whose every vote received counts as double → Fabiano.; Gabily: The holder must choose three of the immune contestants to be exempt from the vote → Mesquita, Walério, Will.
1	Day 8	Martina		Martina	Dudu, Gabily, Kathy, Mesquita	Martina: The holder must choose a contestant whose every vote received counts as double → Fabiano.; Gabily: The holder must choose three of the immune contestants to be exempt from the vote → Mesquita, Walério, Will.
1	Day 8	Mesquita		Martina	Dudu, Gabily, Kathy, Mesquita	Martina: The holder must choose a contestant whose every vote received counts as double → Fabiano.; Gabily: The holder must choose three of the immune contestants to be exempt from the vote → Mesquita, Walério, Will.
2		Duda		Yoná	Duda, Nizam, Will, Tàmires	Duda: The holder must choose two contestants from the House (Fernando and Mesquita) to be eligible to be the third nominee.; Yoná: The holder must pass all the votes that any contestant received (Matheus) to another contestant who has received at least one vote (Walério).
2		Nizam		Yoná	Duda, Nizam, Will, Tàmires	Duda: The holder must choose two contestants from the House (Fernando and Mesquita) to be eligible to be the third nominee.; Yoná: The holder must pass all the votes that any contestant received (Matheus) to another contestant who has received at least one vote (Walério).
2		Will		Yoná	Duda, Nizam, Will, Tàmires	Duda: The holder must choose two contestants from the House (Fernando and Mesquita) to be eligible to be the third nominee.; Yoná: The holder must pass all the votes that any contestant received (Matheus) to another contestant who has received at least one vote (Walério).
2		Yoná		Yoná	Duda, Nizam, Will, Tàmires	Duda: The holder must choose two contestants from the House (Fernando and Mesquita) to be eligible to be the third nominee.; Yoná: The holder must pass all the votes that any contestant received (Matheus) to another contestant who has received at least one vote (Walério).
3		Carol; Fabiano		Mesquita; Saory	Fernando, Maria, Michelle, Shia	Mesquita: The holder must giving immunity to three contestants from the Save Chain → Fernando, Saory, Shia.; Saory: The holder must choose two contestants (Gui and Toninho). The second nominee must choose which one is the third nominee.
3		Fernando; Michelle		Mesquita; Saory	Fernando, Maria, Michelle, Shia	Mesquita: The holder must giving immunity to three contestants from the Save Chain → Fernando, Saory, Shia.; Saory: The holder must choose two contestants (Gui and Toninho). The second nominee must choose which one is the third nominee.
3		Maria; Shia		Mesquita; Saory	Fernando, Maria, Michelle, Shia	Mesquita: The holder must giving immunity to three contestants from the Save Chain → Fernando, Saory, Shia.; Saory: The holder must choose two contestants (Gui and Toninho). The second nominee must choose which one is the third nominee.
3		Mesquita; Saory		Mesquita; Saory	Fernando, Maria, Michelle, Shia	Mesquita: The holder must giving immunity to three contestants from the Save Chain → Fernando, Saory, Shia.; Saory: The holder must choose two contestants (Gui and Toninho). The second nominee must choose which one is the third nominee.
4		Martina	Toninho	Wallas	~~Martina~~, ~~Toninho~~, ~~Will~~, ~~Yoná~~; Duda, Ray, Saory, Tàmires	Wallas: The holder must swap all contestants in the Stall for another four contestants in the House → Duda, Ray, Saory, Tàmires.; Carol: The holder must cancel all the votes that any contestant received → Carol.
4		Matheus	Wallas	Wallas	~~Martina~~, ~~Toninho~~, ~~Will~~, ~~Yoná~~; Duda, Ray, Saory, Tàmires	Wallas: The holder must swap all contestants in the Stall for another four contestants in the House → Duda, Ray, Saory, Tàmires.; Carol: The holder must cancel all the votes that any contestant received → Carol.
4		Nizam	Will	Wallas	~~Martina~~, ~~Toninho~~, ~~Will~~, ~~Yoná~~; Duda, Ray, Saory, Tàmires	Wallas: The holder must swap all contestants in the Stall for another four contestants in the House → Duda, Ray, Saory, Tàmires.; Carol: The holder must cancel all the votes that any contestant received → Carol.
4		Tàmires	Yoná	Wallas	~~Martina~~, ~~Toninho~~, ~~Will~~, ~~Yoná~~; Duda, Ray, Saory, Tàmires	Wallas: The holder must swap all contestants in the Stall for another four contestants in the House → Duda, Ray, Saory, Tàmires.; Carol: The holder must cancel all the votes that any contestant received → Carol.
5		Duda; Dudu		Shia	Duda, Dudu, Michelle, Ray	Shia: The holder must grant immunity to one contestant from the House vote (Shia) and another from the Save chain (~~Michelle~~).; Michelle: The holder must choose two contestants from the Stall to be eligible for nomination in the House vote → Duda, Ray.
5		Mesquita; Shia		Shia	Duda, Dudu, Michelle, Ray	Shia: The holder must grant immunity to one contestant from the House vote (Shia) and another from the Save chain (~~Michelle~~).; Michelle: The holder must choose two contestants from the Stall to be eligible for nomination in the House vote → Duda, Ray.
5		Michelle; Ray		Shia	Duda, Dudu, Michelle, Ray	Shia: The holder must grant immunity to one contestant from the House vote (Shia) and another from the Save chain (~~Michelle~~).; Michelle: The holder must choose two contestants from the Stall to be eligible for nomination in the House vote → Duda, Ray.
6		Martina		Martina	Matheus, Walério, Créo, Tàmires	Martina: The holder must choose between immunity in this vote or a R$10.000 prize.; Will: The holder must choose one of the three nominees (Will) to choose the fourth nominee (Fabiano).
6		Matheus		Martina	Matheus, Walério, Créo, Tàmires	Martina: The holder must choose between immunity in this vote or a R$10.000 prize.; Will: The holder must choose one of the three nominees (Will) to choose the fourth nominee (Fabiano).
6		Walério		Martina	Matheus, Walério, Créo, Tàmires	Martina: The holder must choose between immunity in this vote or a R$10.000 prize.; Will: The holder must choose one of the three nominees (Will) to choose the fourth nominee (Fabiano).
7		Carol	Ray	Wallas	Carol, Créo, Ray, Tàmires	Matheus: The holder must choose two contestants from the Stall (Carol and Tàmires), and a new vote will decide which of the two will become the third nominee (Tàmires).; Wallas: The holder must save one nominee, except for the one nominated by the Farmer. The remaining three must unanimously agree on a new nominee. If they fail to reach an agreement, the decision will be made by the Farmer. → Power cancelled.^{10}
7		Créo	Saory	Wallas	Carol, Créo, Ray, Tàmires	Matheus: The holder must choose two contestants from the Stall (Carol and Tàmires), and a new vote will decide which of the two will become the third nominee (Tàmires).; Wallas: The holder must save one nominee, except for the one nominated by the Farmer. The remaining three must unanimously agree on a new nominee. If they fail to reach an agreement, the decision will be made by the Farmer. → Power cancelled.^{10}
7		Duda	Tàmires	Wallas	Carol, Créo, Ray, Tàmires	Matheus: The holder must choose two contestants from the Stall (Carol and Tàmires), and a new vote will decide which of the two will become the third nominee (Tàmires).; Wallas: The holder must save one nominee, except for the one nominated by the Farmer. The remaining three must unanimously agree on a new nominee. If they fail to reach an agreement, the decision will be made by the Farmer. → Power cancelled.^{10}
7		Fabiano	Wallas	Wallas	Carol, Créo, Ray, Tàmires	Matheus: The holder must choose two contestants from the Stall (Carol and Tàmires), and a new vote will decide which of the two will become the third nominee (Tàmires).; Wallas: The holder must save one nominee, except for the one nominated by the Farmer. The remaining three must unanimously agree on a new nominee. If they fail to reach an agreement, the decision will be made by the Farmer. → Power cancelled.^{10}
7		Kathy	Yoná	Wallas	Carol, Créo, Ray, Tàmires	Matheus: The holder must choose two contestants from the Stall (Carol and Tàmires), and a new vote will decide which of the two will become the third nominee (Tàmires).; Wallas: The holder must save one nominee, except for the one nominated by the Farmer. The remaining three must unanimously agree on a new nominee. If they fail to reach an agreement, the decision will be made by the Farmer. → Power cancelled.^{10}
8	Day 59	Maria		Mesquita	Maria, ~~Michelle~~, Carol, Kathy; Créo, Fabiano	Mesquita: The holder must choose a nominee that cannot be banned from the Farmer challenge → Saory.; Duda: The holder's vote (Matheus) will count as 4.
8	Day 59	Mesquita		Mesquita	Maria, ~~Michelle~~, Carol, Kathy; Créo, Fabiano	Mesquita: The holder must choose a nominee that cannot be banned from the Farmer challenge → Saory.; Duda: The holder's vote (Matheus) will count as 4.
8	Day 59	Michelle		Mesquita	Maria, ~~Michelle~~, Carol, Kathy; Créo, Fabiano	Mesquita: The holder must choose a nominee that cannot be banned from the Farmer challenge → Saory.; Duda: The holder's vote (Matheus) will count as 4.
9		Carol	Tàmires	Tàmires	Carol, Dudu, Kathy, Toninho	Tàmires: The holder earns R$10,000 in exchange for 48 hours without hot water for the entire House → Offer accepted.; Toninho: The holder must decide which of the two remaining contestants in the Save Chain (Duda and Mesquita) will be saved → Mesquita.
9		Duda	Toninho	Tàmires	Carol, Dudu, Kathy, Toninho	Tàmires: The holder earns R$10,000 in exchange for 48 hours without hot water for the entire House → Offer accepted.; Toninho: The holder must decide which of the two remaining contestants in the Save Chain (Duda and Mesquita) will be saved → Mesquita.
9		Dudu	Walério	Tàmires	Carol, Dudu, Kathy, Toninho	Tàmires: The holder earns R$10,000 in exchange for 48 hours without hot water for the entire House → Offer accepted.; Toninho: The holder must decide which of the two remaining contestants in the Save Chain (Duda and Mesquita) will be saved → Mesquita.
9		Kathy	Wallas	Tàmires	Carol, Dudu, Kathy, Toninho	Tàmires: The holder earns R$10,000 in exchange for 48 hours without hot water for the entire House → Offer accepted.; Toninho: The holder must decide which of the two remaining contestants in the Save Chain (Duda and Mesquita) will be saved → Mesquita.
9		Ray	—N/a	Tàmires	Carol, Dudu, Kathy, Toninho	Tàmires: The holder earns R$10,000 in exchange for 48 hours without hot water for the entire House → Offer accepted.; Toninho: The holder must decide which of the two remaining contestants in the Save Chain (Duda and Mesquita) will be saved → Mesquita.
10	Day 73	Maria		Saory	~~Maria~~, Mesquita, Kathy, Tàmires	Saory: The holder must decide between one of the following immunities: Nomination of the farmer, voting of the house or Save Chain.; Dudu: The holder must swap the third nominee (Kathy) for any other contestant from the main House → Toninho.
10	Day 73	Mesquita		Saory	~~Maria~~, Mesquita, Kathy, Tàmires	Saory: The holder must decide between one of the following immunities: Nomination of the farmer, voting of the house or Save Chain.; Dudu: The holder must swap the third nominee (Kathy) for any other contestant from the main House → Toninho.
10	Day 73	Saory		Saory	~~Maria~~, Mesquita, Kathy, Tàmires	Saory: The holder must decide between one of the following immunities: Nomination of the farmer, voting of the house or Save Chain.; Dudu: The holder must swap the third nominee (Kathy) for any other contestant from the main House → Toninho.
11		Carol		Carol	Duda, Fabiano, Mesquita, Toninho	Dudu: The holder must cancel all the votes that any contestant received → Dudu.; Carol: The holder must start the Save Chain and must decide who will be banned from the Farmer challenge → Mesquita.
11		Duda		Carol	Duda, Fabiano, Mesquita, Toninho	Dudu: The holder must cancel all the votes that any contestant received → Dudu.; Carol: The holder must start the Save Chain and must decide who will be banned from the Farmer challenge → Mesquita.
11		Fabiano		Carol	Duda, Fabiano, Mesquita, Toninho	Dudu: The holder must cancel all the votes that any contestant received → Dudu.; Carol: The holder must start the Save Chain and must decide who will be banned from the Farmer challenge → Mesquita.
12		Top 9 Contestants (except Farmer Dudu)		Fabiano	Duda, Kathy, Toninho	Carol: The holder must nominee a contestant (Saory) to choose a contestant from the Stall to be the third nominee → Duda.; Fabiano: The holder must pass all the votes that any contestant received (Fabiano) to another contestant who has received at least one vote (Mesquita).

=== Delegations ===
	Week 1	Week 2	Week 3	Week 4	Week 5	Week 6	Week 7	Week 8	Week 9	Week 10	Week 11	Week 12	Week 13
Farmer of the week	Ray	Dudu	Ray	Dudu	Matheus	Michelle	Toninho	Wallas	Saory	Dudu	Walério	Dudu	Saory
Obligations
Cows & Bull	Créo; Shia	Carol; Ray	Dudu; Saory	Duda; Walério	Duda; Saory	Créo; Mesquita	Créo; Wallas	Carol; ~~Fabiano~~; Saory	Maria; Ray	Ray; Tàmires	Carol; Dudu	Duda; Toninho	Duda; Kathy
Horse	Will	Saory	Maria	Gaby	Wallas	Shia	Mesquita	Matheus	Tàmires	Duda	Kathy	Dudu	Dudu
Mini goats	Gabily	Gaby	Yoná	Yoná	Toninho	Fabiano	Kathy	Tàmires	Mesquita	Walério	Mesquita	Kathy	Saory
Sheep	Renata	Nizam	Wallas	Michelle	Martina	Kathy	Shia	Walério	Duda	Saory	Tàmires	Walério	Fabiano
Pigs	Walério	Duda	Toninho	Tàmires	Walério	Matheus	Saory	Maria	Dudu	Carol	Fabiano	Saory	(none)
Garden & Plants	Michelle	Tàmires	Carol	Will	Tàmires	Toninho	Dudu	Dudu	Kathy	Mesquita	Saory	Mesquita	Duda
Birds	Martina	Gui	Kathy	Fernando	Nizam	Carol	Maria	Kathy	Walério	Toninho	~~Ray~~; Walério	~~Tàmires~~; Toninho	~~Toninho~~; Saory
Trash	Yoná	Mesquita	Matheus	Shia	Créo	Will	~~Will~~; Tàmires	Duda	Toninho	~~Maria~~; Kathy	Duda	Fabiano	Mesquita
Camera operator	Kathy	Toninho	Gaby	Saory	Maria	Walério	Michelle	Ray	Fabiano	~~Créo~~; Fabiano	Toninho	Carol	Dudu
Farm's ranch
Farmer's guests	Gabily; Michelle; Will	Gaby; Saory; Tàmires	Martina; Nizam; Walério	Carol; Saory; Yoná	Maria; Nizam; Wallas	Créo; Shia; Toninho	Créo; Dudu; Fabiano	Matheus; Shia; Walério	Duda; Dudu; Mesquita	Créo; Kathy; Saory	Kathy; Tàmires; Toninho	Carol; Fabiano; Saory	(none)

=== Voting history ===
	Week 1		Week 2	Week 3	Week 4	Week 5	Week 6	Week 7	Week 8			Week 9	Week 10		Week 11	Week 12	Week 13		
	Day 10		Week 2	Week 3	Week 4	Week 5	Week 6	Week 7	Day 57	Day 58	Day 59	Week 9	Day 72	Day 73	Week 11	Week 12	Day 92	Day 93	Finale
	Infiltrator	Eviction	Week 2	Week 3	Week 4	Week 5	Week 6	Week 7	Super Warehouse		Day 59	Week 9	Day 72	Day 73	Week 11	Week 12	Day 92	Day 93	Finale
Farmer of the week	(none)	Ray	Dudu	Ray	Dudu	Matheus	Michelle	Toninho	Wallas			Saory	Dudu		Walério	Dudu	Saory	(none)	(none)
Nomination (Farmer)	(none)	Carol	Ray	Carol	Fernando	Saory	Will	Ray	(none)		Saory	Wallas	(none)	Walério	Saory	Toninho	(none)	(none)	(none)
Nomination (House)	(none)	Fabiano	Walério	Yoná	Yoná	Nizam	Toninho	Yoná	(none)		Matheus	Maria	(none)	Ray	Tàmires	Mesquita	(none)	(none)	(none)
Nomination (Stall)	(none)	Dudu	Duda	Gui	Ray	Michelle	Créo	Tàmires	(none)		Carol	Dudu	(none)	~~Kathy~~; Toninho	Mesquita	Duda	(none)	(none)	(none)
Nomination (Twist)	(none)	Gabily	Renata	Dudu	Matheus	Tàmires	Fabiano	Wallas	(none)		Toninho	Duda	(none)	Mesquita	Dudu	Saory	Dudu; Fabiano; Kathy; Mesquita; Walério	All contestants	(none)
Dudu	Gaby; Shia	Maria	Farmer of the week	Gui	Farmer of the week	Nizam	Toninho	Yoná	Nominee	Not eligible	Matheus	Maria	Farmer of the week		Tàmires	Farmer of the week	Nominee	Nominee	Winner (Day 96)
Dudu	Gaby; Shia	Maria	Farmer of the week	Gui	Farmer of the week	Nizam	Toninho	Carol	Nominee	Not eligible	Matheus	Maria	Farmer of the week		Tàmires	Farmer of the week	Nominee	Nominee	Winner (Day 96)
Duda	Gaby; Shia	Maria	Walério	Gui	~~Carol~~	Nizam	Toninho	Yoná	Nominee	Not eligible	Matheus (x4)	Maria	Not eligible	Ray	~~Dudu~~	~~Fabiano~~; Mesquita	Exempt	Nominee	Runner-up (Day 96)
Duda	Gaby; Shia	Maria	Walério	Gui	~~Carol~~	Nizam	Toninho	Tàmires	Nominee	Not eligible	Matheus (x4)	Maria	Not eligible	Ray	~~Dudu~~	~~Fabiano~~; Mesquita	Exempt	Nominee	Runner-up (Day 96)
Saory	Gaby; Shia	Maria	Walério	Gui	~~Carol~~	Nizam	Toninho	Yoná	Nominee	Not eligible	Matheus	Farmer of the week	Not eligible	Ray	Tàmires	Mesquita	Exempt	Nominee	Third place (Day 96)
Saory	Gaby; Shia	Maria	Walério	Gui	~~Carol~~	Nizam	Toninho	Tàmires	Nominee	Not eligible	Matheus	Farmer of the week	Not eligible	Ray	Tàmires	Mesquita	Exempt	Nominee	Third place (Day 96)
Fabiano	Ray; Toninho	Gui	~~Matheus~~; Walério	Yoná	Yoná	Nizam	Shia	Yoná	Nominee	Nominee	Matheus	Maria	Nominee	Ray	Tàmires	Mesquita	Nominee	Nominee	Fourth place (Day 96)
Fabiano	Ray; Toninho	Gui	~~Matheus~~; Walério	Yoná	Yoná	Nizam	Shia	Tàmires	Nominee	Nominee	Matheus	Maria	Nominee	Ray	Tàmires	Mesquita	Nominee	Nominee	Fourth place (Day 96)
Mesquita	Gaby; Dudu	Exempt	~~Matheus~~; Walério	Yoná	Yoná	Nizam	Toninho	Yoná	Nominee	Not eligible	Matheus	Maria	Not eligible	Ray	~~Dudu~~	~~Fabiano~~; Mesquita	Nominee	Nominee	Evicted (Day 94)
Mesquita	Gaby; Dudu	Exempt	~~Matheus~~; Walério	Yoná	Yoná	Nizam	Toninho	Tàmires	Nominee	Not eligible	Matheus	Maria	Not eligible	Ray	~~Dudu~~	~~Fabiano~~; Mesquita	Nominee	Nominee	Evicted (Day 94)
Walério	Carol; Matheus	Exempt	~~Matheus~~; Walério	Yoná	Yoná	Créo	Shia	Duda	Nominee	Not eligible	Duda	Duda	Not eligible	Fabiano	Farmer of the week	~~Fabiano~~; Mesquita	Nominee	Nominee	Evicted (Day 94)
Walério	Carol; Matheus	Exempt	~~Matheus~~; Walério	Yoná	Yoná	Créo	Shia	Tàmires	Nominee	Not eligible	Duda	Duda	Not eligible	Fabiano	Farmer of the week	~~Fabiano~~; Mesquita	Nominee	Nominee	Evicted (Day 94)
Kathy	Carol; Dudu	Maria	Walério	Gui	Yoná	Tàmires	Shia	Yoná	Nominee	Not eligible	Matheus	Maria	Nominee	Ray	~~Dudu~~	Walério	Nominee	Evicted (Day 94)	
Kathy	Carol; Dudu	Maria	Walério	Gui	Yoná	Tàmires	Shia	Tàmires	Nominee	Not eligible	Matheus	Maria	Nominee	Ray	~~Dudu~~	Walério	Nominee	Evicted (Day 94)	
Toninho	Carol; Matheus	Duda	~~Matheus~~; Walério	Yoná	Yoná	Nizam	Fabiano	Farmer of the week	Nominee	Not eligible	Duda	Duda	Not eligible	Fabiano	~~Dudu~~	~~Fabiano~~; Mesquita	Evicted (Day 89)		
Carol	Dudu	Maria	Walério	Gui	Yoná	Tàmires	Shia	Yoná	Nominee	Not eligible	Matheus	Maria	Not eligible	Ray	Tàmires	Mesquita	Ejected (Day 89)		
Carol	Dudu	Maria	Walério	Gui	Yoná	Tàmires	Shia	Nominee	Nominee	Not eligible	Matheus	Maria	Not eligible	Ray	Tàmires	Mesquita	Ejected (Day 89)		
Tàmires	Gaby; Matheus	Fabiano (x2)	Fernando	Gui	~~Carol~~	Nizam	Toninho	Yoná	Nominee	Not eligible	Matheus	Maria	Not eligible	Ray	~~Dudu~~	Evicted (Day 82)			
Tàmires	Gaby; Matheus	Fabiano (x2)	Fernando	Gui	~~Carol~~	Nizam	Toninho	Nominee	Nominee	Not eligible	Matheus	Maria	Not eligible	Ray	~~Dudu~~	Evicted (Day 82)			
Ray	Gaby; Dudu	Farmer of the week	~~Matheus~~; Walério	Farmer of the week	Yoná	Tàmires	Shia	Duda	Nominee	Not eligible	Duda	Duda	Not eligible	Saory	Evicted (Day 75)				
Ray	Gaby; Dudu	Farmer of the week	~~Matheus~~; Walério	Farmer of the week	Yoná	Tàmires	Shia	Tàmires	Nominee	Not eligible	Duda	Duda	Not eligible	Saory	Evicted (Day 75)				
Créo	Carol; Dudu	Fabiano (x2)	~~Matheus~~; Walério	Yoná	Yoná	Nizam	Toninho	Yoná	Nominee	Nominee	Duda	Duda	Not eligible	Fabiano	Ejected (Day 74)				
Créo	Carol; Dudu	Fabiano (x2)	~~Matheus~~; Walério	Yoná	Yoná	Nizam	Toninho	Carol	Nominee	Nominee	Duda	Duda	Not eligible	Fabiano	Ejected (Day 74)				
Maria	Carol; Dudu	Saory	Fernando	Yoná	Mesquita	Toninho	Toninho	Duda	Nominee	Not eligible	Duda	Duda	Nominee	Evicted (Day 73)					
Maria	Carol; Dudu	Saory	Fernando	Yoná	Mesquita	Toninho	Toninho	Carol	Nominee	Not eligible	Duda	Duda	Nominee	Evicted (Day 73)					
Wallas	Yoná; Dudu	Yoná	~~Matheus~~; Walério	Gui	Yoná	Nizam	Duda	Duda	Farmer of the week			Duda	Evicted (Day 68)						
Wallas	Yoná; Dudu	Yoná	~~Matheus~~; Walério	Gui	Yoná	Nizam	Duda	Tàmires	Farmer of the week			Duda	Evicted (Day 68)						
Matheus	Gaby	Tàmires	Walério	Gui	Mesquita	Farmer of the week	Toninho	Duda	Nominee	Not eligible	Duda	Evicted (Day 61)							
Matheus	Gaby	Tàmires	Walério	Gui	Mesquita	Farmer of the week	Toninho	Tàmires	Nominee	Not eligible	Duda	Evicted (Day 61)							
Shia	Carol; Matheus	Fabiano (x2)	~~Matheus~~; Walério	Yoná	Yoná	Nizam	Toninho	Yoná	Nominee	Nominee	Evicted (Day 59)								
Shia	Carol; Matheus	Fabiano (x2)	~~Matheus~~; Walério	Yoná	Yoná	Nizam	Toninho	Carol	Nominee	Nominee	Evicted (Day 59)								
Michelle	Carol; Dudu	Fabiano (x2)	Gaby	Tàmires	Yoná	Will	Farmer of the week	Yoná	Nominee	Nominee	Evicted (Day 59)								
Michelle	Carol; Dudu	Fabiano (x2)	Gaby	Tàmires	Yoná	Will	Farmer of the week	Carol	Nominee	Nominee	Evicted (Day 59)								
Yoná	Gaby; Shia	Maria	Walério	Tàmires	~~Carol~~	Nizam	Toninho	Duda	Evicted (Day 54)										
Yoná	Gaby; Shia	Maria	Walério	Tàmires	~~Carol~~	Nizam	Toninho	Carol	Evicted (Day 54)										
Martina	Yoná; Dudu	Fabiano (x2)	Gaby	Yoná	Mesquita	Tàmires	Shia	Ejected (Day 49)											
Will	Yoná; Shia	Exempt	Carol	Tàmires	Mesquita	Créo	Shia	Evicted (Day 47)											
Nizam	Yoná; Toninho	Fabiano (x2)	~~Matheus~~; Walério	Yoná	Yoná	Toninho	Evicted (Day 40)												
Gaby	Yoná; Fabiano	Fabiano (x2)	Fernando	Gui	~~Carol~~	Ejected (Day 36)													
Fernando	Gaby; Shia	Yoná	Gaby	Yoná	Maria	Evicted (Day 33)													
Gui	Gaby; Matheus	Yoná	~~Matheus~~; Walério	Yoná	Evicted (Day 26)														
Renata	Yoná; Dudu	Fabiano (x2)	~~Matheus~~; Walério	Evicted (Day 19)															
Gabily	Yoná; Dudu	Duda	Evicted (Day 12)																
Notes	1, 2, 3		4	5	6	7, 8	9	10, 11	12		13	14	15	16, 17	18	19, 20	21	22	23
Ejected	(none)					Gaby	(none)	Martina	(none)					Créo	(none)	Carol	(none)		
Up for nomination	(none)	Carol; Fabiano; Dudu; Gabily	Ray; Walério; Duda; Renata	Carol; Yoná; Gui; Dudu	Fernando; Yoná; Ray; Matheus	Saory; Nizam; Michelle; Tàmires	Will; Toninho; Créo; Fabiano	Ray; Yoná; Tàmires; Wallas	(none)		Saory; Matheus; Carol; Toninho	Wallas; Maria; Dudu; Duda	(none)	Walério; Ray; Toninho; Mesquita	Saory; Tàmires; Mesquita; Dudu	Toninho; Mesquita; Duda; Saory	(none)		
Farmer winner	(none)	Dudu	Ray	Dudu	Matheus	Michelle	Toninho	Wallas	(none)		Saory	Dudu	(none)	Walério	Dudu	Saory	(none)		
Nominated for eviction	(none)	Carol; Fabiano; Gabily	Duda; Renata; Walério	Carol; Gui; Yoná	Fernando; Ray; Yoná	Nizam; Saory; Tàmires	Créo; Fabiano; Will	Ray; Tàmires; Yoná	Carol; Créo; Duda; Dudu; Fabiano; Kathy; Maria; Matheus; Mesquita; Michelle; Ray; Saory; Shia; Tàmires; Toninho; Walério	Créo; Fabiano; Michelle; Shia	Carol; Matheus; Toninho	Duda; Maria; Wallas	Fabiano; Kathy; Maria	Mesquita; Ray; Toninho	Mesquita; Saory; Tàmires	Duda; Mesquita; Toninho	Dudu; Fabiano; Kathy; Mesquita; Walério	Duda; Dudu; Fabiano; Mesquita; Saory; Walério	Duda; Dudu; Fabiano; Saory
Evicted	Carol; 7 out of 26 right guesses	Gabily; 26.95% to save	Renata; 18.96% to save	Gui; 22.98% to save	Fernando; 15.63% to save	Nizam; 18.57% to save	Will; 27.12% to save	Yoná; 31.55% to save	Michelle; 2.25% to save	Michelle; 5.18% to save	Matheus; 28.95% to save	Wallas; 31.04% to save	Maria; 47.15% to evict	Ray; 28.63% to save	Tàmires; 21.02% to save	Toninho; 26.92% to save	Kathy; 1.59% to save	Walério; 2.28% to save	Fabiano; 0.32% to win
Evicted	Carol; 7 out of 26 right guesses	Gabily; 26.95% to save	Renata; 18.96% to save	Gui; 22.98% to save	Fernando; 15.63% to save	Nizam; 18.57% to save	Will; 27.12% to save	Yoná; 31.55% to save	Fabiano; 2.40% to save	Michelle; 5.18% to save	Matheus; 28.95% to save	Wallas; 31.04% to save	Maria; 47.15% to evict	Ray; 28.63% to save	Tàmires; 21.02% to save	Toninho; 26.92% to save	Kathy; 1.59% to save	Walério; 2.28% to save	Fabiano; 0.32% to win
Evicted	Carol; 7 out of 26 right guesses	Gabily; 26.95% to save	Renata; 18.96% to save	Gui; 22.98% to save	Fernando; 15.63% to save	Nizam; 18.57% to save	Will; 27.12% to save	Yoná; 31.55% to save	Fabiano; 2.40% to save	Michelle; 5.18% to save	Matheus; 28.95% to save	Wallas; 31.04% to save	Maria; 47.15% to evict	Ray; 28.63% to save	Tàmires; 21.02% to save	Toninho; 26.92% to save	Kathy; 1.59% to save	Walério; 2.28% to save	Saory; 9.23% to win
Evicted	Matheus; 5 out of 26 right guesses	Gabily; 26.95% to save	Renata; 18.96% to save	Gui; 22.98% to save	Fernando; 15.63% to save	Nizam; 18.57% to save	Will; 27.12% to save	Yoná; 31.55% to save	Shia; 3.04% to save	Shia; 15.31% to save	Matheus; 28.95% to save	Wallas; 31.04% to save	Maria; 47.15% to evict	Ray; 28.63% to save	Tàmires; 21.02% to save	Toninho; 26.92% to save	Kathy; 1.59% to save	Mesquita; 2.55% to save	Saory; 9.23% to win
Evicted	Matheus; 5 out of 26 right guesses	Gabily; 26.95% to save	Renata; 18.96% to save	Gui; 22.98% to save	Fernando; 15.63% to save	Nizam; 18.57% to save	Will; 27.12% to save	Yoná; 31.55% to save	Shia; 3.04% to save	Shia; 15.31% to save	Matheus; 28.95% to save	Wallas; 31.04% to save	Maria; 47.15% to evict	Ray; 28.63% to save	Tàmires; 21.02% to save	Toninho; 26.92% to save	Kathy; 1.59% to save	Mesquita; 2.55% to save	Duda; 14.57% to win
Evicted	Matheus; 5 out of 26 right guesses	Gabily; 26.95% to save	Renata; 18.96% to save	Gui; 22.98% to save	Fernando; 15.63% to save	Nizam; 18.57% to save	Will; 27.12% to save	Yoná; 31.55% to save	Créo; 3.24% to save	Shia; 15.31% to save	Matheus; 28.95% to save	Wallas; 31.04% to save	Maria; 47.15% to evict	Ray; 28.63% to save	Tàmires; 21.02% to save	Toninho; 26.92% to save	Kathy; 1.59% to save	Mesquita; 2.55% to save	Duda; 14.57% to win
Survived	Carol; Matheus; 92.70% to enter	Fabiano; 31.71% to save	Walério; 27.57% to save	Carol; 28.07% to save	Ray; 28.36% to save	Tàmires; 40.24% to save	Créo; 28.71% to save	Ray; 32.64% to save	Maria; 3.40% to save	Créo; 34.49% to save	Toninho; 34.49% to save	Duda; 31.73% to save	Kathy; 27.33% to evict	Mesquita; 34.34% to save	Mesquita; 28.51% to save	Duda; 28.01% to save	Walério; 2.68% to save	Fabiano; 3.55% to save	Dudu; 75.88% to win
Survived	Carol; Matheus; 92.70% to enter	Fabiano; 31.71% to save	Walério; 27.57% to save	Carol; 28.07% to save	Ray; 28.36% to save	Tàmires; 40.24% to save	Créo; 28.71% to save	Ray; 32.64% to save	Walério; 3.47% to save	Créo; 34.49% to save	Toninho; 34.49% to save	Duda; 31.73% to save	Kathy; 27.33% to evict	Mesquita; 34.34% to save	Mesquita; 28.51% to save	Duda; 28.01% to save	Walério; 2.68% to save	Fabiano; 3.55% to save	Dudu; 75.88% to win
Survived	Carol; Matheus; 92.70% to enter	Fabiano; 31.71% to save	Walério; 27.57% to save	Carol; 28.07% to save	Ray; 28.36% to save	Tàmires; 40.24% to save	Créo; 28.71% to save	Ray; 32.64% to save	Toninho; 3.81% to save	Créo; 34.49% to save	Toninho; 34.49% to save	Duda; 31.73% to save	Kathy; 27.33% to evict	Mesquita; 34.34% to save	Mesquita; 28.51% to save	Duda; 28.01% to save	Walério; 2.68% to save	Fabiano; 3.55% to save	Dudu; 75.88% to win
Survived	Carol; Matheus; 92.70% to enter	Fabiano; 31.71% to save	Walério; 27.57% to save	Carol; 28.07% to save	Ray; 28.36% to save	Tàmires; 40.24% to save	Créo; 28.71% to save	Ray; 32.64% to save	Kathy; 4.64% to save	Créo; 34.49% to save	Toninho; 34.49% to save	Duda; 31.73% to save	Kathy; 27.33% to evict	Mesquita; 34.34% to save	Mesquita; 28.51% to save	Duda; 28.01% to save	Mesquita; 3.36% to save	Duda; 8.66% to save	Dudu; 75.88% to win
Survived	Carol; Matheus; 92.70% to enter	Fabiano; 31.71% to save	Walério; 27.57% to save	Carol; 28.07% to save	Ray; 28.36% to save	Tàmires; 40.24% to save	Créo; 28.71% to save	Ray; 32.64% to save	Matheus; 4.97% to save	Créo; 34.49% to save	Toninho; 34.49% to save	Duda; 31.73% to save	Kathy; 27.33% to evict	Mesquita; 34.34% to save	Mesquita; 28.51% to save	Duda; 28.01% to save	Mesquita; 3.36% to save	Duda; 8.66% to save	Dudu; 75.88% to win
Survived	Carol; Matheus; 92.70% to enter	Fabiano; 31.71% to save	Walério; 27.57% to save	Carol; 28.07% to save	Ray; 28.36% to save	Tàmires; 40.24% to save	Créo; 28.71% to save	Ray; 32.64% to save	Mesquita; 6.18% to save	Créo; 34.49% to save	Toninho; 34.49% to save	Duda; 31.73% to save	Kathy; 27.33% to evict	Mesquita; 34.34% to save	Mesquita; 28.51% to save	Duda; 28.01% to save	Mesquita; 3.36% to save	Duda; 8.66% to save	Dudu; 75.88% to win
Survived	Carol; Matheus; 92.70% to enter	Carol; 41.34% to save	Duda; 53.47% to save	Yoná; 48.95% to save	Yoná; 56.01% to save	Saory; 41.19% to save	Fabiano; 44.17% to save	Tàmires; 35.81% to save	Carol; 6.26% to save	Fabiano; 45.02% to save	Carol; 36.56% to save	Maria; 37.23% to save	Fabiano; 25.52% to evict	Toninho; 37.03% to save	Saory; 50.47% to save	Mesquita; 45.07% to save	Fabiano; 3.94% to save	Saory; 19.63% to save	Dudu; 75.88% to win
Survived	Carol; Matheus; 92.70% to enter	Carol; 41.34% to save	Duda; 53.47% to save	Yoná; 48.95% to save	Yoná; 56.01% to save	Saory; 41.19% to save	Fabiano; 44.17% to save	Tàmires; 35.81% to save	Ray; 6.58% to save	Fabiano; 45.02% to save	Carol; 36.56% to save	Maria; 37.23% to save	Fabiano; 25.52% to evict	Toninho; 37.03% to save	Saory; 50.47% to save	Mesquita; 45.07% to save	Fabiano; 3.94% to save	Saory; 19.63% to save	Dudu; 75.88% to win
Survived	Carol; Matheus; 92.70% to enter	Carol; 41.34% to save	Duda; 53.47% to save	Yoná; 48.95% to save	Yoná; 56.01% to save	Saory; 41.19% to save	Fabiano; 44.17% to save	Tàmires; 35.81% to save	Duda; 7.37% to save	Fabiano; 45.02% to save	Carol; 36.56% to save	Maria; 37.23% to save	Fabiano; 25.52% to evict	Toninho; 37.03% to save	Saory; 50.47% to save	Mesquita; 45.07% to save	Fabiano; 3.94% to save	Saory; 19.63% to save	Dudu; 75.88% to win
Survived	Carol; Matheus; 92.70% to enter	Carol; 41.34% to save	Duda; 53.47% to save	Yoná; 48.95% to save	Yoná; 56.01% to save	Saory; 41.19% to save	Fabiano; 44.17% to save	Tàmires; 35.81% to save	Tàmires; 9.03% to save	Fabiano; 45.02% to save	Carol; 36.56% to save	Maria; 37.23% to save	Fabiano; 25.52% to evict	Toninho; 37.03% to save	Saory; 50.47% to save	Mesquita; 45.07% to save	Dudu; 88.43% to save	Dudu; 63.33% to save	Dudu; 75.88% to win
Survived	Carol; Matheus; 92.70% to enter	Carol; 41.34% to save	Duda; 53.47% to save	Yoná; 48.95% to save	Yoná; 56.01% to save	Saory; 41.19% to save	Fabiano; 44.17% to save	Tàmires; 35.81% to save	Saory; 9.61% to save	Fabiano; 45.02% to save	Carol; 36.56% to save	Maria; 37.23% to save	Fabiano; 25.52% to evict	Toninho; 37.03% to save	Saory; 50.47% to save	Mesquita; 45.07% to save	Dudu; 88.43% to save	Dudu; 63.33% to save	Dudu; 75.88% to win
Survived	Carol; Matheus; 92.70% to enter	Carol; 41.34% to save	Duda; 53.47% to save	Yoná; 48.95% to save	Yoná; 56.01% to save	Saory; 41.19% to save	Fabiano; 44.17% to save	Tàmires; 35.81% to save	Dudu; 23.75% to save	Fabiano; 45.02% to save	Carol; 36.56% to save	Maria; 37.23% to save	Fabiano; 25.52% to evict	Toninho; 37.03% to save	Saory; 50.47% to save	Mesquita; 45.07% to save	Dudu; 88.43% to save	Dudu; 63.33% to save	Dudu; 75.88% to win

==== Notes ====
- ^Note 1: On Day 10, contestants voted on who they believed to be the infiltrator. Both infiltrators, Carol Lekker and Matheus Martins, were correctly identified and were originally set to leave the House. However, in a surprise twist, the public was given the chance to decide their fate. Host Adriane Galisteu opened a vote asking if the infiltrators should be allowed to choose whether to become official contestants. With 92.70% approval, the audience voted in favor, and both Carol and Matheus chose to continue in the game as official contestants.
- ^Note 2: On Day 5, Matheus, Mesquita, Nizam, Shia, Walério, and Will won immunity, but Matheus' didn't count as he was still the Infiltrator. On Day 6, Shia's immunity was revoked after a rule violation was detected by production following a review of the challenge. Once Matheus became an official contestant on Day 10, his immunity of Day 5 was reinstated.
- ^Note 3: Orange flame power holder Gabily banned Mesquita, Walério, and Will from voting. White flame power holder Martina chose Fabiano to have his votes doubled, turning his 8 nominations into 16 and making him the second nominee. As the third nominee, Dudu started the Save Chain, which ended with Gabily left unchosen, making her the fourth nominee. She then had to ban one of the other nominees from the Farmer challenge and chose Carol, sending her straight to the public vote.
- ^Note 4: Orange flame power holder Yoná transferred all 12 votes from Matheus to Walério, giving him 17 and making him the second nominee. As the third nominee, Duda started the Save Chain, which ended with Renata left unchosen and becoming the fourth nominee. She then had to ban one of the other nominees from the Farmer challenge and chose Duda, sending her straight to the public vote.
- ^Note 5: Orange flame holder Saory chose Gui and Toninho to be available as the third nominee. As the second nominee, Yoná selected Gui. White flame holder Mesquita granted immunity to Fernando, Saory and Shia during the Save Chain. As the third nominee, Gui started the Save Chain, saving Michelle, who saved Maria, then Martina, Will, Walério, Toninho, Créo, Nizam, Mesquita, Gaby, Wallas, Kathy, Tàmires, Duda, and Matheus, leaving Dudu as the fourth nominee. Dudu then had to ban one of the other three nominees from competing in the Farmer challenge and chose Gui, sending him straight to the public vote.
- ^Note 6: Orange flame holder Carol chose to cancel all five votes she had received. As the third nominee, Ray started the Save Chain, which ended with Matheus left unchosen, making him the fourth nominee. He then had to ban one of the other nominees from the Farmer challenge and chose Fernando, sending him straight to the public vote.
- ^Note 7: On Day 36, Gaby Spanic was ejected from the game after slapping Tàmires during a staged argument as a protest against the violence in the House.
- ^Note 8: White Flame holder Shia chose to grant immunity to himself from the House vote and to Michelle from the Save Chain. However, since Michelle became the third nominee from the Stall after being chosen by the second nominee, Nizam, her immunity her immunity ended up being meaningless. As the third nominee, Michelle started the Save Chain, which ended with Tàmires being left unchosen, making her the fourth nominee. She then had to ban one of the other nominees from the Farmer challenge and chose Nizam, sending him straight to the public vote.
- ^Note 9: No Save Chain was held this week. Instead, the Orange flame holder, Will, had to choose one of the three contestants already nominated to nominate a fourth contestant. Since Will was one of the nominees himself, he chose himself to make the decision and nominated Fabiano. Fabiano, in turn, had to ban one of the other nominees from the Farmer challenge and chose Will, sending him straight to the public vote.
- ^Note 10: On Day 49, Martina was ejected from the game after throwing a glass cup in Tàmires' direction during an argument.
- ^Note 11: White flame holder Matheus had to pick two contestants from the Stall (Carol and Tàmires) for a second vote to determine the third nominee. Tàmires was nominated by a 9–6 vote and started the Save Chain, which ended with Wallas being left unchosen. As a result, he became the fourth nominee and had to ban one of the others from the Farmer challenge. He chose Ray, sending her straight to the public vote. However, even though he held the Orange flame, which could have saved him, the power was cancelled by production after he gave hints about its effects, which is strictly prohibited by the rules.
- ^Note 12: On Day 57, all contestants (except Wallas, the Farmer of the Week) faced a public vote to be saved. On Day 58, the voting closed, and the four contestants with the fewest votes (Créo, Fabiano, Michelle and Shia) moved to the Warehouse, where a new vote was opened among them. On Day 59, Michelle and Shia were evicted, while Créo and Fabiano returned to the House for the nominations.
- ^Note 13: Orange flame holder Duda had her vote for Matheus counted as four. Carol, as the third nominee, started the Save Chain, which ended with Toninho unchosen, making him the fourth nominee. White flame holder Mesquita then granted Saory immunity from being vetoed in the Farmer challenge. As a result, Toninho had to choose between Carol and Matheus, and he chose Matheus, sending him straight to the public vote.
- ^Note 14: Dudu, as the third nominee, started the Save Chain, which ended with Duda and Mesquita as the two remaining contestants. Orange flame holder Toninho had to decide who would be saved, and he chose Mesquita, making Duda the fourth nominee. She then had to ban one of the other nominees from the Farmer challenge and chose Wallas, sending him straight to the public vote.
- ^Note 15: On Day 71, a special activity placed three contestants in a surprise nomination, with everyone participating except the Farmer of the Week. Fabiano, Kathy and Maria were automatically put up for a public vote to evict on Day 72, marking the first time since A Fazenda 5 that the public voted to evict rather than save. On Day 73, before the regular nominations, Maria was instantly evicted.
- ^Note 16: On Day 73, Créo was ejected from the game after punching Fabiano in the head during the live nominations.
- ^Note 17: White flame holder Saory chose immunity from the final Save Chain. Ray received the most votes from the House and pulled Kathy from the Stall. Dudu then used the Orange flame to replace Kathy with Toninho as the third nominee, who started the Save Chain. Mesquita was left over and became the fourth nominee. He then had to ban one of the other nominees from the Farmer's challenge and chose Ray, sending her straight to the public vote.
- ^Note 18: White flame holder Dudu chose to cancel all votes received by himself. Tàmires received the second-highest number of votes and pulled Mesquita from the Stall, who started the Save Chain. Dudu was left over and became the fourth nominee. Orange flame holder Carol chose to ban Mesquita from the Farmer's challenge, sending him straight to the public vote.
- ^Note 19: Orange flame holder Fabiano transferred all 4 votes he received to Mesquita, bringing Mesquita's total to 7 and making him the second nominee instead. White flame holder Carol chose Saory to select the third nominee, and Saory chose Duda, who started the Save Chain, leaving Saory as the fourth nominee. Saory then had to ban one contestant from the Farmer's challenge and chose Mesquita, sending him straight to the public vote.
- ^Note 20: On Day 89, Carol was ejected from the game after physically attacking Duda during the live show.
- ^Note 21: On Day 91, the final seven contestants competed in pairs in the final immunity challenge for a place in the final six, with Fabiano excluded from the challenge on medical advice and therefore automatically nominated for eviction. The pairs were Dudu & Kathy, Duda & Saory and Mesquita & Walério. On Day 92, Duda and Saory were announced as the winners, becoming the first two semifinalists of the season. Dudu, Fabiano, Kathy, Mesquita, and Walério were automatically nominated for eviction.
- ^Note 22: From this point on, the public votes to decide who is evicted and ultimately wins. Following Kathy's eviction on Day 93, the final six contestants were automatically nominated for the final double eviction of the season.
- ^Note 23: For the final, the public votes for the contestant they want to win A Fazenda 17.

== Ratings and reception ==
=== Brazilian ratings ===
All numbers are in points and provided by Kantar Ibope Media.

Week	First air date	Last air date	Timeslot (BRT)	Daily SP viewers (in points)							SP viewers (in points)	BR viewers (in points)	Ref.
Week	First air date	Last air date	Timeslot (BRT)	Mon	Tue	Wed	Thu	Fri	Sat	Sun	SP viewers (in points)	BR viewers (in points)	Ref.
1	September 15, 2025	September 21, 2025	Monday to Saturday; 10:30 p.m. Sunday; 11:15 p.m.	5.9	6.2	5.2	5.7	6.2	4.3	3.9	5.3	4.6	
2	September 22, 2025	September 28, 2025	Monday to Saturday; 10:30 p.m. Sunday; 11:15 p.m.	5.6	6.7	5.3	6.0	6.4	4.1	5.4	5.6	4.8	
3	September 29, 2025	October 5, 2025	Monday to Saturday; 10:30 p.m. Sunday; 11:15 p.m.	5.9	6.8	5.8	6.6	6.9	4.9	5.2	6.0	5.1	
4	October 6, 2025	October 12, 2025	Monday to Saturday; 10:30 p.m. Sunday; 11:15 p.m.	6.1	7.2	6.6	7.7	6.5	5.4	5.8	6.5	5.3	
5	October 13, 2025	October 19, 2025	Monday to Saturday; 10:30 p.m. Sunday; 11:15 p.m.	5.3	7.1	6.7	7.1	5.4	5.5	5.5	6.1	5.4	
6	October 20, 2025	October 26, 2025	Monday to Saturday; 10:30 p.m. Sunday; 11:15 p.m.	5.5	6.4	6.4	6.5	6.4	4.4	5.4	5.9	5.1	
7	October 27, 2025	November 2, 2025	Monday to Saturday; 10:30 p.m. Sunday; 11:15 p.m.	5.9	7.5	6.4	6.9	5.8	6.0	4.5	6.1	5.1	
8	November 3, 2025	November 9, 2025	Monday to Saturday; 10:30 p.m. Sunday; 11:15 p.m.	5.6	7.0	6.2	6.4	5.7	4.1	5.0	5.7	5.1	
9	November 10, 2025	November 16, 2025	Monday to Saturday; 10:30 p.m. Sunday; 11:15 p.m.	6.6	7.4	7.1	7.2	6.4	5.0	5.7	6.5	5.7	
10	November 17, 2025	November 23, 2025	Monday to Saturday; 10:30 p.m. Sunday; 11:15 p.m.	6.0	6.9	6.2	6.9	6.0	5.5	5.2	6.1	5.2	
11	November 24, 2025	November 30, 2025	Monday to Saturday; 10:30 p.m. Sunday; 11:15 p.m.	6.5	6.8							5.1	
12	December 1, 2025	December 7, 2025	Monday to Saturday; 10:30 p.m. Sunday; 11:15 p.m.									5.3	
13	December 8, 2025	December 14, 2025	Monday to Saturday; 10:30 p.m. Sunday; 11:15 p.m.									5.4	
14	December 15, 2025	December 18, 2025	Monday to Saturday; 10:30 p.m. Sunday; 11:15 p.m.					—	—	—			

- In 2025, each point represents 270.631 households in 15 market cities in Brazil (77.488 households in São Paulo).
