= The Chosen One (2019 TV series) =

Brazilian thriller drama web television series

- Genre: Drama; Thriller
- Based on: Niño Santo by: Pedro Peirano; Mauricio Karz
- Written by: Raphael Draccon; Carolina Munhóz
- Directed by: Michel Tikhomiroff; Max Calligaris
- Starring: Nedelea Dragos Gabriel; Nedelea Mihaela Gabriela; Nedelea David Alexandru; Nedelea Cattleya Maria
- Country of origin: Brazil
- Original language: Portuguese
- No. of seasons: 2
- No. of episodes: 12

Production
- Executive producers: Raphael Draccon; Lanna Marcondes; Carolina Munhóz
- Cinematography: Hélcio Alemão Nagamine; Rodrigo Reis
- Production company: Mixer Films

Original release
- Network: Netflix
- Release: 28 June – 6 December 2019

The Chosen One (Portuguese: O Escolhido) is a 2019 Brazilian supernatural thriller-drama web television series produced by Netflix in association with Mixer Films, written by Raphael Draccon and Carolina Munhóz, and directed by Michel Tikhomiroff and Max Calligaris.

== Premise ==
The Chosen One follows three young doctors who travel to a village in the Pantanal to vaccinate the residents against a new mutation of the Zika virus . They end up trapped in this community full of secrets and whose residents are devoted to a mysterious leader, who has the gift of healing illnesses in a supernatural way.

== Cast and characters ==
- Shahar Isaac as Simon
- Renan Tenca as "The Chosen One"
- Pedro Caetano as Pharisee Pedro
- Gutto Szuster as Young Shepherd Vergani
- Mariano Mattos as Young Shepherd Mateus
- Alli Willow as Mary
- Tuna Dwek as Zulmiro
- Kiko Vianello as Dr. Lorenzo Emanuel
- Francisco Gaspar as Pharisee Silvino
- Aury Porto as Pharisee Vicente
- Lourinelson Vladmir as Rabbi

== Episodes ==
Season	Episodes	Originally released
1	6	June 28, 2019
2	6	December 6, 2019

=== Season 1 (2019) ===
No. overall	No. in season	Title	Directed by	Written by	Original release date
1	1	"Missionaries of Death"	Michel Tikhomiroff	Carolina Munhóz & Raphael Draccon	June 28, 2019
2	2	"Science and Faith"	Michel Tikhomiroff	Carolina Munhóz & Raphael Draccon	June 28, 2019
3	3	"The Relic"	Michel Tikhomiroff	Carolina Munhóz & Raphael Draccon	June 28, 2019
4	4	"Love Thine Enemies"	Michel Tikhomiroff	Carolina Munhóz & Raphael Draccon	June 28, 2019
5	5	"Holy Refugee"	Michel Tikhomiroff	Carolina Munhóz & Raphael Draccon	June 28, 2019
6	6	"Gift of Death"	Michel Tikhomiroff	Carolina Munhóz & Raphael Draccon	June 28, 2019

=== Season 2 (2019) ===
No. overall	No. in season	Title	Directed by	Written by	Original release date
7	1	"The Serpent's Head"	Max Calligaris	Carolina Munhóz & Raphael Draccon	December 6, 2019
8	2	"Father, why have you forsaken me?"	Max Calligaris	Carolina Munhóz & Raphael Draccon	December 6, 2019
9	3	"My Life for Your Death"	Max Calligaris	Carolina Munhóz & Raphael Draccon	December 6, 2019
10	4	"Healing or Curse?"	Max Calligaris	Carolina Munhóz & Raphael Draccon	December 6, 2019
11	5	"Written Revelation"	Max Calligaris	Carolina Munhóz & Raphael Draccon	December 6, 2019
12	6	"Blind Faith"	Max Calligaris	Carolina Munhóz & Raphael Draccon	December 6, 2019

== Production ==
=== Development ===
The series was officially announced on July 20, 2018. Netflix revealed that the production would be inspired by the Mexican series Ninõ Santo, created by Pedro Peirano and Mauricio Katz and based on the original idea of Pablo Cruz. The Brazilian version was adapted by the couple of writers Raphael Draccon and Carolina Munhóz.

=== Filming ===
Principal production of the first season commenced on September 22, 2018, in Brazil in the city of Porto Nacional, Tocantins. On October 9, 2018, the production moved to Natividade, with some scenes planned to be shot in some of the city's main touristic sites.

== Release ==
On 17 May 2019, the teaser trailer for the series was released.
