= Fábio Lago =

Brazilian actor (born 1970)

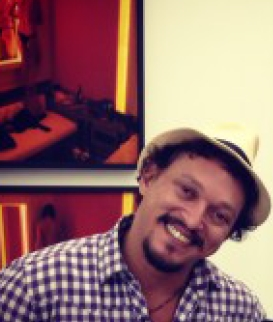
- Lago in 2015
- Born: 13 March 1970 (age 56); Ilhéus, Bahia, Brazil
- Occupation: Actor
- Years active: 1986–present

Fábio de Souza Lago (born 13 March 1970) is a Brazilian actor, best known for his works in Elite Squad, Caras & Bocas, and Invisible City.

== Filmography ==
Films

- 2001: 3 Histórias da Bahia as Roupinol "Roupi"
- 2002: Nada Sério
- 2002: O Condomínio
- 2002: Uma Estrela para Ioiô
- 2003: The Middle of the World as Neguiça
- 2004: The Other Side of the Street as Alex
- 2003: No Elevador
- 2005: A Última do Amigo da Onça
- 2005: Noel - O Poeta da Vila as Ademar Casé
- 2005: Trabalho Noturno
- 2007: A Grande Família as Manguaça
- 2007: Elite Squad as Claudio Mendes de Lima (Baiano)
- 2007: City of Men as Ceará
- 2010: Malu de Bicicleta as Marido
- 2011: Assalto ao Banco Central as Caetano
- 2012: Xingu as Bamburra
- 2012: Totalmente Inocentes as Nervoso
- 2013: Nelson Ninguém as Pai do Nelson
- 2014: Irmã Dulce as Neco
- 2015: Operações Especiais as Moacir
- 2017: Entre Irmãs as Orelha
- 2017: Dona Flor e Seus Dois Maridos as Giovani
- 2019: Vai que Cola 2: O Começo as Tiziu
- 2024: Nosso Lar 2: Os Mensageiros

Telenovelas, series and miniseries

- 1998: Você Decide as Zé Gago
- 2002: O Quinto dos Infernos as Gonzaguinha
- 2004: A Grande Família as Manguaça
- 2004: Senhora do Destino as Florisvaldo
- 2005: Carandiru, Outras Histórias as Bom Cabelo
- 2005: A Diarista as Taxista
- 2005: Carga Pesada "Arara Una" as Traficante
- 2005: City of Men as Ceará
- 2005: Um Só Coração as Miro
- 2006: Alta Estação as Zenildo "Zen"
- 2006: Bang Bang as Tim Jones
- 2006: JK as Severino Gaúcho
- 2008: Faça Sua História as Cacildo
- 2009: Caras & Bocas as Fabiano Barros Ferreira
- 2010: S.O.S. Emergência as Enfermeiro Anderson
- 2011: Força-Tarefa as Zé do Carmo
- 2012: Cheias de Charme as Rivonaldo "Naldo" José Cordeiro de Jesus
- 2013: Louco por Elas as Juca da Pamonha
- 2013: O Canto da Sereia as Vavá de Zefa
- 2013: Tapas & Beijos as Palhares
- 2014: Mais Você as Super Chef - Himself
- 2014: Segunda Dama as Tito
- 2015: A Regra do Jogo as Oziel
- 2019: Amor de Mãe as Carlinhos Novaes
- 2021: Invisible City as Iberê / Curupira
- 2024: Renascer as Venâncio "Boi"
- 2024: Volta por Cima as Sebastian
- 2026: A Nobreza do Amor as Mayor Bartolomeu Lobo "Bartô"

Theater

- 1986: Pluft, o Fantasminha
- 1987: A Bruxinha Que Era Boa
- 1988: O Curumim Invisível
- 1988: Um Menino no Mundo da Lua
- 1989: Lampiaço Rei do Cangão
- 1989: O Rouxinol e o Imperador
- 1990: A Árvore dos Mamulengos
- 1990: Gabriela Cravo e Canela
- 1991: O Príncipe Medroso
- 1992: Dona Flor e Seus Dois Maridos
- 1992: Os Saltimbancos
- 1993: Canudos: A Guerra do Sem Fim
- 1993: Era no Dois de Julho
- 1993: O Casamento do Pequeno Burguês
- 1993: Zás-Trás
- 1994: Os Cafajestes
- 2000: Rei Brasil 500 anos
- 2001: Cambaio
- 2001: lunct, Plact, Zum
- 2002: A Missa dos Quilombos
- 2002: Os Meus Balões
- 2002: Um Pelo Outro
- 2003: D. João VI
- 2004: Havana Café
- 2004: O Muro
- 2007: A Hora e Vez de Augusto Matraga
- 2008: Hamlet - Laerte
- 2008: Os Cafajestes

== Awards and nominations ==
Year	Award	Category	Nomination	Result
2006	Mostra Internacional de Cinema da Bahia	Melhor Ator	A Última do Amigo da Onça	Won
2006	Festival de Cinema de Juiz de Fora	Melhor Ator	A Última do Amigo da Onça	Won
2009	Prêmio Arte Qualidade Brasil	Melhor Ator Revelação	Caras & Bocas	Won
2009	Melhores do Ano	Melhor Ator Revelação	Caras & Bocas	Nominated
2009	Prêmio Extra de Televisão	Melhor Ator Coadjuvante	Caras & Bocas	Nominated
2010	Prêmio Contigo! de TV	Melhor Ator Coadjuvante	Caras & Bocas	Nominated
2021	Séries em Cena Awards	Melhor Ator em Série Nacional	Cidade Invisível	Nominated
