= Natalie Smith (actress) =

Brazilian actress

- Born: 9 December 1991 (age 34); Mogi das Cruzes, São Paulo, Brazil
- Occupation: Actress

Natalie Smith (born 9 December 1991) is a Brazilian actress, producer, director and screenwriter who became known for acting in productions like The Stripper, Melhor Amiga da Noiva, Poesias Para Gael and Chicas Carioca

== Career ==
Natalie started as an actress in 2005 in the theater starring in the play A Noiva Cadaver, in 2012 she acted in O Recruta Dennis, in 2017 she acted in the series Perigosos and in the film Poesias Para Gael as Eline, the antagonist of the plot. In 2018, she acted in the feature film Chicas Cariocas, directed by Wolf Maya, playing the character Paula. In 2017 she starred in the series Melhor Amiga da Noiva, the most watched LGBT series in Latin America on YouTube. In 2019, she starred in the series The Stripper. Since 2022, she and her business partner (Ponto Aceo Productions) and director Priscilla Pugliese have been directing Stupid Wife and then Xeque Mate which have been successful webseries around the world.

== Filmography ==
Television
Date	Title	Role
2024 - present	Xeque Mate	Clarice
2019 - 2020	The Stripper	Camila / Karla
2017 - 2018	Poesias Para Gael	Eline
2020	Poesias Para Gael 2	Eline
2014	Perigosos	Giovanna
2017	Chicas Carioca	Paula
2016	Entre Duas Linhas	Lauren
