= Three Summers (2019 film) =

2019 film

- Film poster
- Portuguese: Três Verões
- Directed by: Sandra Kogut
- Starring: Regina Casé
- Release date: 5 September 2019 (TIFF)
- Running time: 94 minutes
- Country: Brazil
- Language: Portuguese

Three Summers (Portuguese: Três Verões) is a 2019 Brazilian drama film directed by Sandra Kogut. It was screened in the Contemporary World Cinema section at the 2019 Toronto International Film Festival.

== Cast ==
- Regina Casé as Madá
- Rogério Fróes as Mr Lira
- Otávio Müller as Edgar Lira
- Alli Willow

== Plot ==
Over a trio of summers, Madá, a housekeeper for a luxury summer villa in an exclusive coastal town in Brazil, relies on her resourcefulness and her eye for opportunity when her employers (Edgar, played by Otávio Müller and Marta, played by Gisele Fróes) are caught in major corruption scandals and leave the house empty and their employees stranded without pay.

In 2015 Madá dreams of opening a roadside kiosk, and Edgar gives her money for a parcel of land. In 2016, the troubles begin for the owners, and the authorities take away incriminating evidence and discover fraudulent accounts and transactions. Edgar had been using Madá's identity to obtain fraudulent cellphone numbers. Madá organises a sale of the owner's luxury items like shoes, clothing and statues to pay off the other helpers, who also profit from the swimming pool, champagne, and other luxuries for a while. With the owner's father, Mr Lira (Rogério Fróes), who was staying in the house while his own apartment in Copacabana was being renovated, she advertises the house for short term rentals and attracts a film crew, who also enlist her in their production, a role in which she excels and reveals something of her own difficult life. She also takes tourists out on the family's luxury yacht, explaining where the rich, the famous, and the criminals live. She forms a bond of kindness with Mr Lira, who uses a wheelchair. He ashamed of the corruption his son has perpetrated.

Eventually, in the third summer shown in the movie, 2017, the owner is going to be placed under house arrest on the property but without his wife Marta, who has left him. We have already learned there are other rich Brazilians in the town who are able to buy themselves out of prison in this way. Madá and the other helpers have to leave. But Madá's good fortune continues. Mr Lira dies and unexpectedly leaves his Copacabana apartment to Madá, rather than to his own family. A couple of blocks from the famous beach, her and her friends see in the New Year from that apartment.

== Reception ==
Variety magazine notes that "Casé looks the part of a workaday stand-in for millions of low-income Brazilians who toil away for scraps while the rich skirt the law to become richer", but they say the film is poorly paced, one sequence is confusingly portrayed, and they brand it an opportunity missed to explore the stark contrast between white collar crime and the survival of the poor.
