= Julia Konrad =

Brazilian actress (born 1990)

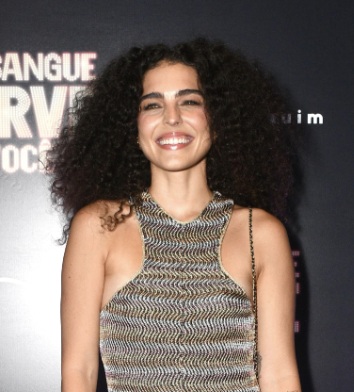
- Born: 6 August 1990 (age 36); Recife, Pernambuco, Brazil
- Occupations: Actress, singer
- Years active: 2013–present

Julia Konrad (born 6 August 1990) is a Brazilian actress and singer. She is best known for her roles in the Brazilian series Invisible City and Dom. In 2026, she joined the cast of Netflix's adaptation of Paulo Coelho's The Pilgrimage.

== Biography and career ==
Born in Recife, Brazil, Konrad moved with her family to Buenos Aires, Argentina, during childhood, where they lived for 10 years. She later relocated to New York to study performing arts, graduating from the American Musical and Dramatic Academy in 2012.

Her first screen role was in the independent feature film Allure (2014), directed by Vladan Nikolic. The film premiered at the Black Nights Film Festival 2014 in Tallinn, Estonia, where it was nominated for "Best North American Film".

In 2021, Julia joins both the casts of Brazilian Netflix original series Invisible City, created by Carlos Saldanha, and Dom, a Brazilian true crime drama for Amazon Prime Video starring Gabriel Leone.

In 2026, Konrad was announced in The Pilgrimage, Netflix's film adaptation of Paulo Coelho's novel, starring Rodrigo Santoro.
