= Nova Geração de Televisão =

Brazilian television network

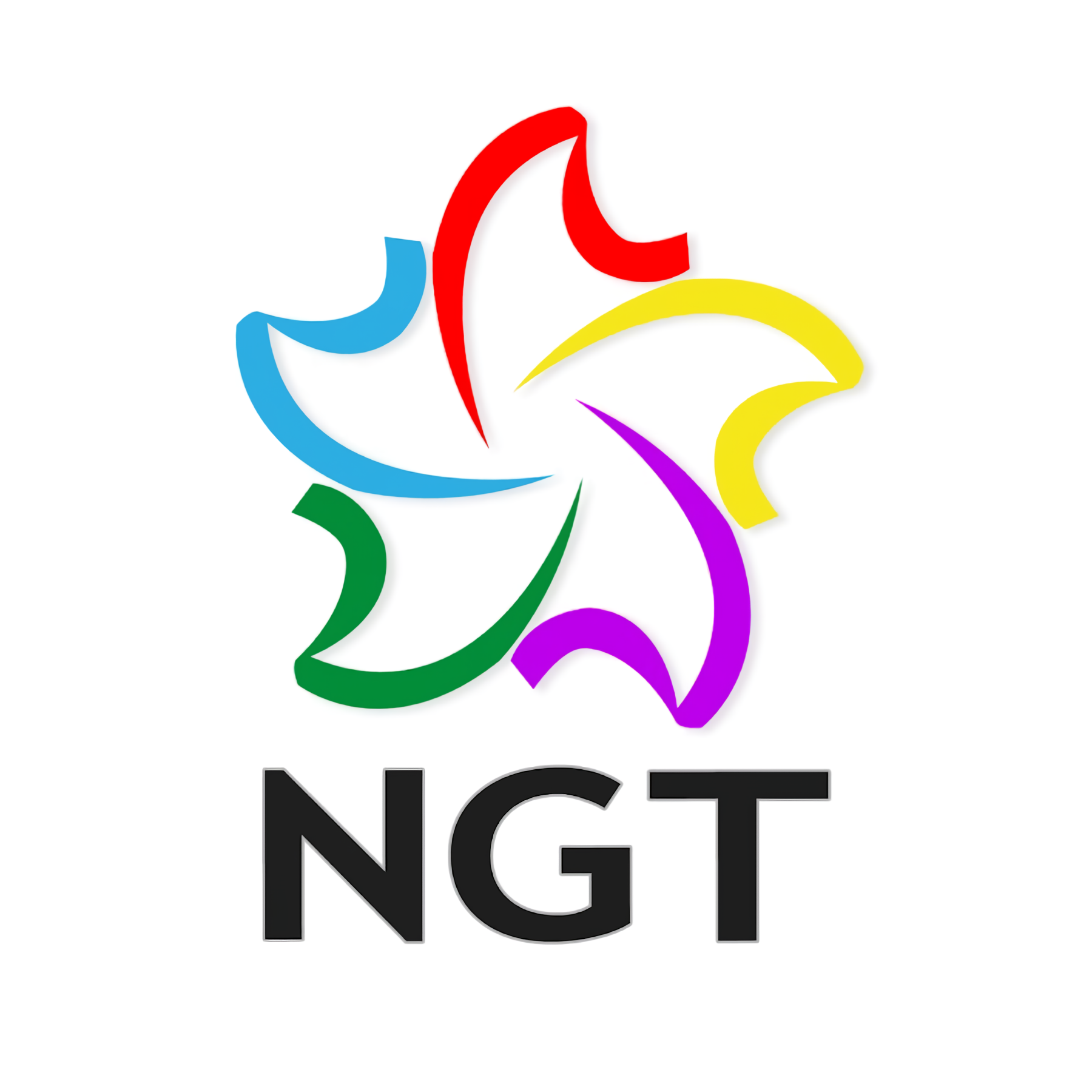
- Type: Free-to-air television network
- Country: Brazil
- Headquarters: São Paulo, Brazil; Rio de Janeiro, Brazil

Programming
- Language: Portuguese
- Picture format: 1080i (HDTV)

Ownership
- Owner: Fundação de Fátima and Fundação Veneza
- Key people: Manoel Antônio Bernardes Costa, president

History
- Launched: October 8, 2003
- Founder: 1996; 30 years ago (as UniTV); October 8, 2003; 22 years ago (as NGT)
- Former names: UniTV (1996-2003)

Links
- Website: www.redengt.com.br

NGT (Portuguese: Nova Geração de Televisão - English New Generation of Television) is a Brazilian television network. The station came about through the acquisition of two educational television concessions by businessman Marco Antônio Bernardes Costa; one in the city of Osasco, in the state of São Paulo, on behalf of the Fundação Fátima, and another in the city of Rio de Janeiro, on behalf of the Fundação Veneza. These concessions became the two headquarters of the network, together producing its national programming. The network has 35 affiliated television stations in 15 Brazilian states, as well as several retransmitters in 17 states, covering 13.6% of Brazilian territory.

== History ==
In the early 2000s, businessman Manoel Antônio Bernardi Costa acquired the concessions for channels 48 UHF in the city of Osasco, in the state of São Paulo, on behalf of the Fundação de Fátima, and 26 UHF in Rio de Janeiro, capital of the state of the same name, on behalf of the Fundação Veneza, both of an educational nature, which until then belonged to UniTV, and which would become the headquarters of Nova Geração de Televisão. The antenna manufacturer Mectrônica, owned by Manoel, was responsible for financing the costs of the future network. On April 24, 2003, the station's headquarters, located in the Butantã neighborhood of São Paulo, named Espaço 48, was opened to the public. Its structure was assembled by about 100 designers and decorators coordinated by Regina Fronterotta and Ricardo Rangel, the latter also being the general director of NGT.

Broadcasting from São Paulo via the Torre Cásper Líbero, located in the Gazeta Building on Paulista Avenue, which also rebroadcast TV Gazeta's signal, the network went on air on October 8, 2003, showing eight hours of outsourced programming on a trial basis. The documentaries that made up its schedule were produced by the educational channel STV (now SescTV) and by the Argentine pay TV channels Infinito and FashionTV, owned by the company Claxson, with which NGT entered into a partnership.

Between 2010 and 2011, the channel entered into a partnership with E+ Entretenimento to show series and films on its schedule. Between 2011 and 2013, NGT entered into a collaboration with TV Diário de Fortaleza to rebroadcast some of the Ceará-based network's programs on the network's national schedule. On May 25, 2015, the independent production company Medialand licensed its content for broadcast on the network.

On June 14, 2017, part of NGT's daily programming was leased to TV Plenitude, a station owned by the Igreja Apostólica Plenitude do Trono de Deus. The lease ended on April 17, 2018. In 2019, after the São Paulo station deactivated its journalism department and began producing only one program, the network leased all of its time slots. During November, December 2020 and January 2021, the channel began airing only reruns of the remaining attractions on a loop. In addition to the lack of productions to fill the entire time slot, the station also aired old commercials from Lula, even going almost 24 hours a day without showing any programs, leaving the screen black. There is also alleged information about the sale of the channel, with an estimated value of R$150 million.

After returning to the air, albeit partially, in 2021, WebTV Rede STA began to rebroadcast much of NGT São Paulo's programming, incorporating it into most of its television schedule.

On November 11, 2022, Rede NGT gained a new affiliate in Belém, NBT (Norte Brasil Televisão), owned by presenter and politician Jefferson Lima. There is no information indicating that NBT belongs to the Grupo Rauland, given that Rauland already owns the TV Grão Pará and TV One Belém channels. Internet records using the network's CNPJ (Corporate Taxpayer ID) show that the company has been registered since 2016 by journalist and politician Jefferson Lima.

On January 8, 2024, it was reported that TV presenter Ratinho had considered acquiring Rede NGT. However, he decided not to proceed with the negotiation due to the amount requested by Manoel Bernardi Costa, owner of the network, which was described as considerable. He requested R$250 million for NGT, which led Ratinho to reject the proposal, considering it excessively high.

On September 18, 2025, channel 11.1 in Belém ceased to be a relay of NGT, returning to NBT (Norte Brasil Televisão), which is owned by presenter and politician Jefferson Lima.

== Stations ==
- NGT São Paulo (channel 16, virtual 3) (former 48)
- NGT Rio de Janeiro (channel 45, virtual 12)
- TV Litorânea Camaçari
- TV Buré Jacareacanga
- TV Local Vitória da Conquista Channel 36
- TBL Senhor do Bonfim Channel 23 Cable

Viçosa Canal 99 (TVCOM)

- TV Verde Vale (Ceará)
- TV Capital - Vitória - Channel 25 (RCA Cable)
- TV Sudeste - Guarapari - Channel 17 (RCA Cable)
- TV Serra - Serra - Channel 14 (RCA Cable)
- TV Linhares - Linhares - Channel 6 (RCA Cable)
- Star TV - Nova Venécia - Channel ?
- FCTV and TVM - Coelho Neto - Channel 33 UHF
- TV Sete Lagoas - Sete Lagoas - Channel 13 (Cable)

NGT Minas Sul - Três Pontas - Channel 3 VHF

- TV Lafaiete - Belo Horizonte - Channel 41 UHF (under implementation)
- TV Lafaiete - Conselheiro Lafaiete - Channel 38 UHF
- TV Poços - Botelhos - Channel 44 UHF
- TV Poços - Alfenas - Channel 27 UHF

TV Poços - Bandeira do Sul - Channel 10 VHF TV Poços - Conceição do Rio Verde - Channel 11 VHF TV Poços - Cambuquira - Channel 13 VHF TV ANTV - Andradas – Channel 36 UHF NGT South of Minas - Três Pontas - Channel 33 UHF Veneza System - Belém - Channels 42 and 59 UHF (under implementation) TV Redenção - Redenção - Channel 19 UHF and Channel 17 (Cable) NGT Curitiba - Curitiba - Channel 99 (Cable) TV Vila Velha - Ponta Grossa - Channel 16 (Cable) RTV Maringá - Maringá - Channel 10 VHF Pernambuco OK TV (Piauí) TV Cidade - Bento Gonçalves - Channel 14 (Cable) TV Caxias - Caxias do Sul - Channel 14 (Cable) TV Mais - Novo Hamburgo - Channel 14 (Cable) TV Cidade - Porto Velho – Channel 20 (Cabo) TV do Povo - Ariquemes - Channel 35 UHF SEC TV - Mogi-Mirim - Channel 44 UHF SRTV Amparo - Amparo - Channel 39 UHF (analog) and Channel 40 UHF (digital) SRTV Amparo - Pedreira - Channel 36 UHF TV Ubatuba - Ubatuba - Channel 71 (Cable) TV Brasilsat - Guarulhos - Channel 44 UHF TV Brasilsat - Mairiporã - Channel 57 UHF TV Brasilsat - Serra da Mantiqueira - SP - (under implementation) TV Verde - Itapetininga - Channel 99 (Cable) TV 43 - Itu - Channel 43 UHF TV Poços - Caconde - Channel 57 UHF NGT Itatiba Brasil - Itatiba - Channel 56 UHF TV Bragantina - Bragança Paulista - Channel 22 (Cable) TV Cabo Mix - Itatiba - Channel 10 (Cable) TV Cabo Mix - Avaré - Channel 10 (Cable) TV Cabo Mix - Votuporanga - Channel 10 (Cable) TV Cabo Mix - Fernandópolis - Channel 10 (Cable) TV Ourinhos - Ourinhos - Channel 10 (Cable) TV Ourinhos - Ourinhos - Channel 10 (Cable) Mar Azul 2000 - Jandira - Channel 40 (Cable - Multimedia TV) TV Já - Catanduva - Cable Channel

== Former Affiliates ==
- TV Prevê Bauru (2009)
- TV Litorial RJ Via Cabo (2018 - 2024)

== Programs ==
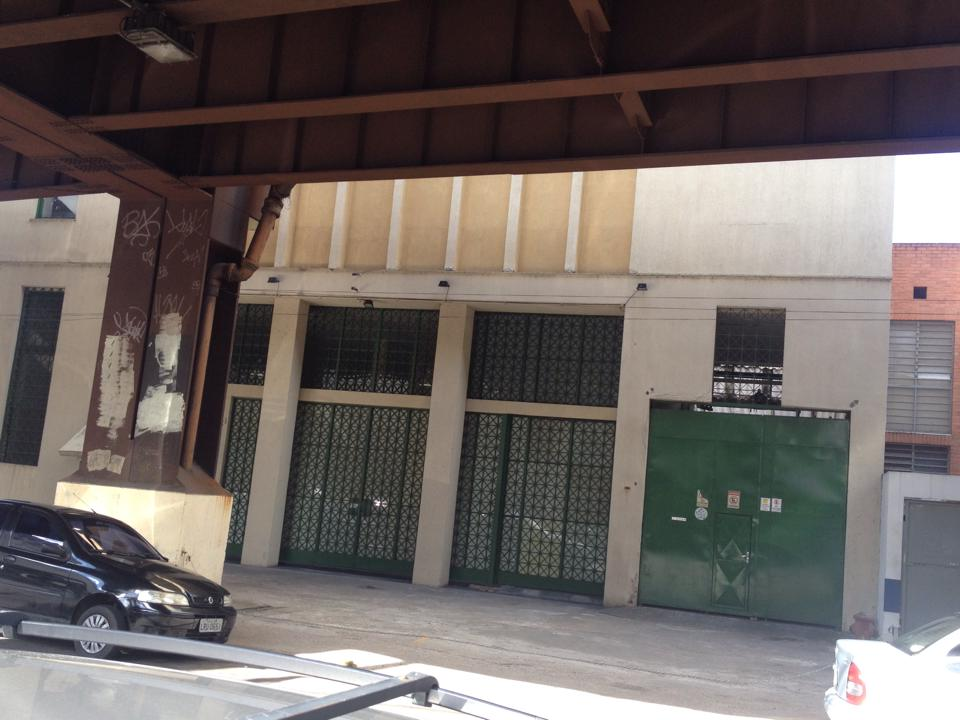
Headquarters of NGT in Rio de Janeiro.

- Anjos da Guarda
- Barlada
- Brazil Cook Book
- Brasil Popular com Roque Silva (former)
- Caminhos do Rodeio
- Celeste Maria Recebe
- Cotidiano
- Desenhos Infantis
- Estilo
- Fala Galera!
- Festa Popular
- Forno Fogão e Cia
- Jornal Metropolitano RJ
- Jornal Metropolitano SP
- Madrugadão NGT
- Mulheres em Ação
- Na Levada do Samba
- NGT Clipes
- NGT Esporte
- NGT Kids (now: Programa Leleko e Cia or Programa do Leleko)
- NGT Notícias
- NGT Séries
- Nordeste em Destaque com Fátima Dantas
- Os C&D
- Os Hermanos Perdidos no Brasil
- P.O.L.Í.C.I.A.
- Profissão Mulher
- Programa do Jacaré (former)
- Programa do KamKam
- Serginho Total
- Sessão de Filmes
- Sessão de Shows
- Show do Balalá
- Temperando o Papo
- Viaja Brasil
- Programa Show Marques
- Programa do Enio Carlos (former)
- Thiaguinho o Aventureiro (former)
