= John Cale discography =

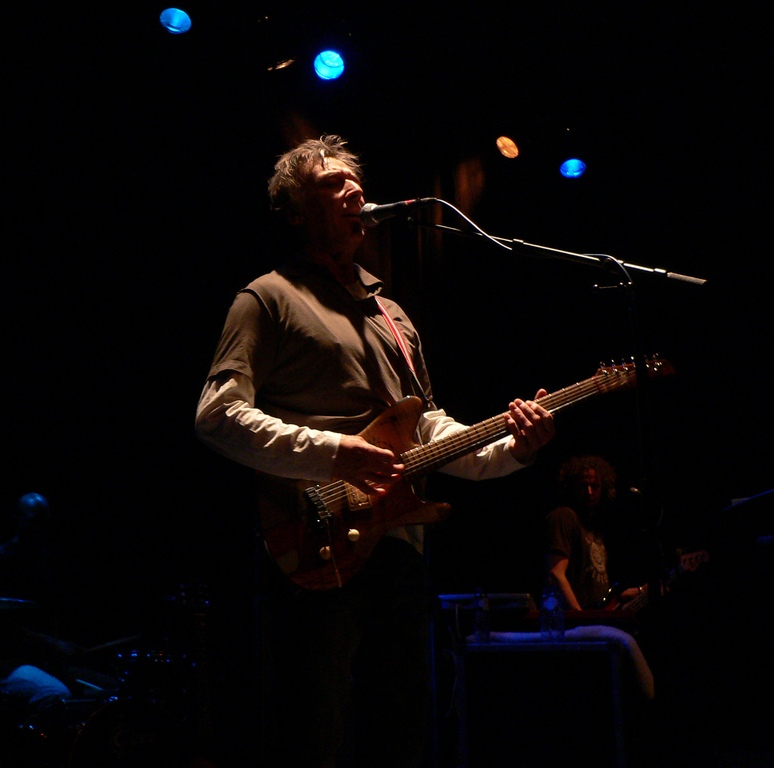
- Studio albums: 19
- Extended plays: 3
- Live albums: 4
- Compilation albums: 5

John Cale (born 9 March 1942) is a Welsh singer, musician, composer, record producer and arranger. He is a founding member of the influential American rock band the Velvet Underground, with whom he recorded two studio albums. In the subsequent four decades, Cale has released varied solo albums, film soundtracks, and collaborations with Lou Reed, Brian Eno, Bob Neuwirth and others.

== Albums ==
=== Studio albums ===
Title	Album details	Peak chart positions				
Title	Album details	BEL Fl.	BEL Wa.	DEN	NLD	US
Vintage Violence	Released: 25 March 1970; Label: Columbia	—	—	—	—	—
Church of Anthrax (with Terry Riley)	Released: April 1971; Label: Columbia	—	—	—	—	—
The Academy in Peril	Released: July 1972; Label: Reprise	—	—	—	—	—
Paris 1919	Released: 25 February 1973; Label: Reprise	—	—	—	—	—
Fear	Released: 1 October 1974; Label: Island	—	—	—	—	—
Slow Dazzle	Released: 25 March 1975; Label: Island	—	—	—	—	—
Helen of Troy	Released: November 1975; Label: Island	—	—	—	—	—
Honi Soit	Released: 10 March 1981; Label: A&M	—	—	—	—	154
Music for a New Society	Released: September 1982; Label: ZE	—	—	—	—	—
Caribbean Sunset	Released: February 1984; Label: ZE	—	—	—	28	—
Artificial Intelligence	Released: 6 September 1985; Label: Beggars Banquet	—	—	—	—	—
Words for the Dying	Released: 19 September 1989; Label: Opal Music/Warner Bros.	—	—	—	—	—
Songs for Drella (with Lou Reed)	Released: 23 April 1990; Label: Sire	—	—	—	—	—
Wrong Way Up (with Brian Eno)	Released: October 1990; Label: Opal Music/Warner Bros.	—	—	—	—	—
Last Day on Earth (with Bob Neuwirth)	Released: May 1994; Label: MCA	—	—	—	—	—
Walking on Locusts	Released: 24 September 1996; Label: Hannibal	—	—	—	—	—
HoboSapiens	Released: 6 October 2003; Label: EMI	—	—	36	—	—
blackAcetate	Released: 17 October 2005; Label: EMI	87	—	—	—	—
Shifty Adventures in Nookie Wood	Released: 1 October 2012; Label: Double Six	58	169	—	—	— (Note: Shifty Adventures in Nookie Wood did not enter the Billboard 200, but it peaked at number 44 on the Billboard Heatseekers Albums chart.)
M:FANS	Released: 22 January 2016; Label: Double Six	52	185	—	—	—
Mercy	Released: 20 January 2023; Label: Double Six	14	145	—	—	—
Poptical Illusion	Released: 14 June 2024; Label: Double Six	79	129	—	—	—
MiXology (volume 1)	Released: 2 May 2025; Label: Double Six	—	—	—	—	—
"—" denotes a recording that did not chart or was not released in that territory.

=== Soundtracks ===
- Paris S'Eveille - Suivi D'autres Compositions (Delabel) November 1991
- 23 Solo Pieces for La naissance de l'amour (Crepuscule) November 1993
- Antártida (Crepuscule) 1995
- N'oublie pas que tu vas mourir (Crepuscule) 1995
- Eat/Kiss: Music for the Films by Andy Warhol (Hannibal) June 1997
- Dance Music (Music for "Nico", the ballet choreographed by Ed Wubbe / Scabino Ballet Rotterdam) Warner 1998
- Le vent de la nuit (Crepuscule) March 1999
- The Unknown (Crepuscule) 1999
- Saint-Cyr (O.S.T.) (Virgin France) 2000
- Process (Syntax) July 2005

=== Live ===
- Sabotage/Live (IRS) December 1979
- John Cale Comes Alive (Ze) September 1984
- Even Cowgirls Get the Blues (ROIR) 1991
- Fragments of a Rainy Season (Hannibal) 25 September 1992
- Le Bataclan '72 (with Lou Reed and Nico) 2004
- Circus Live (EMI) February 2007
- John Cale & Band Live (Rockpalast 1983 & 1984) DVD and vinyl (MIG) 2010

=== Compilations ===
- Guts (Island) February 1977
- Paris s'eveille - suivi d'autres compositions (Crepuscule) November 1991
- Seducing Down the Door: A Collection 1970–1990 (Rhino) 5 July 1994
- The Island Years (Island) 1996
- Close Watch: An Introduction to John Cale (Island) 20 April 1999
- Conflict & Catalysis (Productions & Arrangements 1966–2006) 2012

=== Box sets ===
- New York in the 1960s (Table of the Elements) August 2004
- Ship of Fools: The Island Albums (Esoteric) August 2024

== EPs ==
- Animal Justice (Illegal IL 003, UK) September 1977
- 5 Tracks (EMI) May 2003 (reached No. 13 Budget Album chart)
- Extra Playful (Double Six/Domino Records) September 2011

Short soundtrack

- Somewhere in the City August 1998

== Singles ==
- "Cleo" / "Fairweather Friend" (1970)
- "Big White Cloud" / "Gideon's Bible" (1970)
- "Days of Steam" / "Legs Larry at the Television Centre" (1972)
- "The Man Who Couldn't Afford to Orgy" / "Sylvia Said" (1974)
- "Mercenaries" / "Rosegarden Funeral of Sores" (1980)
- "Dead or Alive" / "Honi Soit" (1981)
- "Close Watch" / "Close Watch" (1983)
- "Close Watch" / "Changes Made" (1983)
- "Hungry for Love" / "Caribbean Sunset" (1984)
- "Ooh La La" / "Magazines" (1984)
- "Villa Albani" remixes / "Hungry for Love" (1984)
- "Dying on the Vine" / "Everytime the Dogs Bark" (1985)
- "Satellite Walk" / "Crash Course in Harmonics" (1985)
- "Nobody But You" – US Alt No. 13 / "Style It Takes" / "A Dream" (1990) – with Lou Reed
- "One Word" / "Grandfather's House"* / "Palanquin" (1990) − with Brian Eno
- "Spinning Away (Edit)" / Grandfather's House" / "Palaquin" (1990) − with Brian Eno
- "Hallelujah" (1991)
- "Paris S'eveille" (1991)
- "The Long Voyage" (1995) – with Suzanne Vega
- "Cale vs the Bees vs Doctor Rockit" (2003)
- "Things" (2003) – UK No. 144
- "Turn the Lights On" (2005)
- "Perfect" (2005)
- "Outta the Bag" (2006)
- "Jumbo in tha Modernworld"* (2007)
- "Big White Cloud" (2007)
- "All My Friends" (2007)
- "Whaddya Mean by That" (2011)
- "I Wanna Talk 2 U" (2012)
- "Face to the Sky" b/w "Living With You" (Organic Mix) (2012)
- "All Summer Long" / "Sandman (Flying Dutchman)" (2013)
- "Lazy Day" (2020) – non-album song
- "Night Crawling" (2022)
- "House" (2025) − with Charli XCX

== Other appearances ==
=== Studio ===
Year	Title	Release	Notes
1991	"Hallelujah"	I'm Your Fan	Leonard Cohen cover
1991	"The Queen and Me"	"More Fans"	Leonard Cohen cover
1993	"Helmut Newton Told Me"/"Wish You Were Here"/"Oh! To Be Invited to the Venice Biennale"	Caged/Uncaged: A Rock/Experimental Homage to John Cage	soundtrack to an exhibition, with Ann Magnuson
2004	"She Doesn't Live Here Anymore"	Por Vida	Alejandro Escovedo cover
2022	"Mr. Sparrow"	For the Birds: The Birdson Project, Vol. III	original

=== Live ===
Year	Title	Notes
1974	June 1, 1974	with Kevin Ayers, Brian Eno, Nico

== Productions and contributions ==
Year	Artist	Release information	Cale's contribution
1967	Nico	Chelsea Girl: Released: October 1967; Label: Verve Records	viola, organ, guitar: various
1968	Morning Glory	Two Suns Worth: Released: May 1968; Label: Fontana Records	sound engineer: album
1969	Nico	The Marble Index: Released: May 1969; Label: Elektra Records	viola, piano, bass guitar, guitar, bells, arrangements: album
1969	The Stooges	The Stooges: Released: August 1969; Label: Elektra Records	production, viola: album
1969	Earth Opera	The Great American Eagle Tragedy: Released: 1969; Label: Elektra Records	guitar, vocals: various
1970	Glass Harp	Glass Harp: Released: 1970; Label: Decca Records	viola: various
1970	Chelsea	Chelsea: Released: 1970; Label: Decca Records	viola: various
1970	Nick Drake	Bryter Layter: Released: November 1970; Label: Island Records	viola, piano, cembalo, celeste, organ: various
1970	Nico	Desertshore: Released: December 1970; Label: Reprise Records	vocals, bass guitar, guitar, keyboards, production: album
1971	Mike Heron	Smiling Men with Bad Reputations: Released: 1971; Label: Elektra Records	guitar, bass guitar, vocals: various
1971	Tax Free	Tax Free: Released: 1971; Label: Polydor Records	viola: album
1972	Jennifer Warnes	Jennifer: Released: 1972; Label: Reprise Records	production: album
1973	Chunky, Novi and Ernie	Chunky, Novi and Ernie: Released: 1973; Label: Warner Bros. Records	production: album
1974	Nico	The End...: Released: 1974; Label: Island Records	bass guitar, xylophone, guitar, synthesizer, piano, organ, marimba, triangle, glockenspiel, percussion, production: album
1975	Geoff Muldaur	Is Having a Wonderful Time: Released: 1975; Label: Reprise Records	viola: "Wondering Why"
1975	Brian Eno	Another Green World: Released: September 1975; Label: Island Records	viola: various
1975	Patti Smith	Horses: Released: December 1975; Label: Arista Records	production: album
1976	The Modern Lovers	The Modern Lovers: Released: August 1976; Label: Beserkley Records	production: primary sessions
1977	Kate & Anna McGarrigle	Dancer with Bruised Knees: Released: 1977; Label: Warner Bros. Records	organ, marimba: various
1977	Squeeze	Packet of Three: Released: July 1977; Label: Deptford Fun City Records	production: EP
1977	Sham 69	Sham 69: Released: 1977; Label: Step Forward Records	production: EP
1978	Squeeze	Squeeze: Released: March 1978; Label: A&M Records	production: album
1978	Cristina	"Disco Clone": Released: 1978; Label: ZE Records	production
1978	Marie et les Garçons	"Attitudes"/"Re-Bop": Released: 1978; Label: Spy Records	production, marimba: both sides
1978	Brian Eno	Music for Films: Released: October 1978; Label: E.G. Records	viola: "Patrolling Wire Borders"
1978	Julie Covington	Julie Covington: Released: 1978; Label: Virgin Records	piano, clavinet: various
1978	David Kubinec	Some Things Never Change: Released: 1978; Label: A&M Records	keyboards, production: album
1978	Harry Toledo & The Rockets	Busted Chevrolet: Released: 1978; Label: Spy Records	production: EP
1978	Menace	"I Need Nothing"/"Electrocutioner": Released: 1978; Label: Illegal Records	production: both sides
1979	Ian Hunter	You're Never Alone with a Schizophrenic: Released: March 1979; Label: Chrysalis Records	piano, keyboards, harp: "Bastard"
1979	Model Citizens	Model Citizens: Released: 1979; Label: Spy Records	production: EP
1979	The Necessaries	"You Can Borrow My Car"/"Runaway Child": Released: 1979; Label: Spy Records	production: both sides
1980	Snatch	Shopping for Clothes: Released: April 1980; Label: Fetish	production: EP
1980	Modern Guy	Une nouvelle vie: Released: 1980; Label: Dorian	production, cembalo, organ, percussion: album
1983	Made for TV	"So Afraid of the Russians"/"Unknown Soldier": Released: 1983; Label: Conflict Records	production, baritone guitar, synthesizer: both sides
1985	Nico	Camera Obscura: Released: 1985; Label: Beggars Banquet Records	production, vocals: album
1986	Lio	Pop Model: Released: 1986; Label: Polydor Records	production: various
1987	Element of Crime	Try to Be Mensch: Released: March 1987; Label: Polydor Records	production, keyboards: album
1987	Happy Mondays	Squirrel and G-Man Twenty Four Hour Party People Plastic Face Carnt Smile: Released: April 1987; Label: Factory Records	production: album
1988	Art Bergmann	Crawl with Me: Released: 1988; Label: Duke Street Records	production: album
1989	Big Vern	Lullabies for Lager Louts: Released: December 1989; Label: Duke Street Records	production, keyboards: album
1990	Los Ronaldos	Sabor Salado: Released: June 1990; Label: EMI Records	production: album
1990	The Replacements	All Shook Down: Released: September 1990; Label: Sire Records	viola: "Sadly Beautiful"
1991	Maureen Tucker	I Spent a Week There the Other Night: Released: 1991; Label: New Rose Records	viola, synthesizer: various
1991	Sister Double Happiness	Heart and Mind: Released: 1991; Label:	radar blips: unknown
1991	Louise Féron	Louise Féron: Released: 1991; Label: Virgin Records	production, piano: album
1991	Les Nouvelles Polyphonies Corses	Les Nouvelles Polyphonies Corses: Released: 1991; Label: Phonogram	piano: "Nana"
1992	Hector Zazou	Sahara Blue: Released: 1992; Label: Made to Measure	vocals: "Hunger"
1994	Vince Bell	Phoenix: Released: July 1994; Label: Sire Records	piano: unknown
1994	Yohji Yamamoto	Your Pain Shall Be a Music: Released: 1994; Label:	vocals: "John Cale"
1994	Hector Zazou	Chansons des mers froides: Released: 1994; Label: Columbia Records	vocals: "The Long Voyage"
1995	Siouxsie and the Banshees	The Rapture: Released: January 1995; Label: Polydor Records	production: album
1995	Ivan Kral	Nostalgia: Released: 1995; Label: BMG Ariola	piano: "Perfect Moon"
1996	Marc Almond	Fantastic Star: Released: February 1996; Label: Mercury Records, Some Bizzare Records	piano: "Love to Die For"
1996	Goya Dress	Rooms: Released: April 1996; Label: Nude Records	production, piano, mixing: album
1996	Patti Smith	Gone Again: Released: June 1996; Label: Arista Records	organ: "Beneath the Southern Cross"
1996	Les Nouvelles Polyphonies Corses	In Paradisu: Released: 1996; Label: Mercury Records	production and arrangements: various
1996	Maids of Gravity	The First Second: Released: September 1996; Label: Vernon Yard Recordings	production: album
1997	Garageland	"Feel Alright": Released: July 1997; Label: Flying Nun Records	piano
1998	The Jesus Lizard	The Jesus Lizard: Released: February 1998; Label: Jetset Records	production: "Needles for Teeth"
1998	Alan Stivell	1 Douar: Released: July 1998; Label: Disques Dreyfus	instruments, mixing: "Ever"
1998	Jack Smith	Les Evening Gowns Damnées (recorded 1962–1964): Released: September 1998; Label: Table of the Elements	sarinda: "Cold Starry Nights"
1999	Jack Smith	Silent Shadows on Cinemaroc Island (recorded in the 60s): Released: January 1999; Label: Table of the Elements	performance: "Silent Shadows on Cinemaroc Island"
1999	Ventilator	Desert Station Frequency: Released: 1999; Label:	production: various
2000	Mediæval Bæbes	Undrentide: Released: September 2000; Label: BMG Classics	production: album
2001	Super Furry Animals	Rings Around the World: Released: July 2001; Label: Epic Records	piano: "Presidential Suite"
2001	Jools Holland	Small World Big Band (live): Released: December 2001; Label: WEA	vocals: "I Wanna Be Around"
2002	Gordon Gano	Hitting the Ground: Released: August 2002; Label: Instinct Records	piano, vocals: "Don't Pretend"
2002	Trash Palace	Positions: Released: 2002; Label: Discograph	vocals: "The Insult"
2003	Angus MacLise	The Cloud Doctrine (recorded in the 60s): Released: May 2003; Label: Sub Rosa	viola, guitar, keyboards: various
2006	Alejandro Escovedo	The Boxing Mirror: Released: May 2006; Label: Back Porch Records	production: album
2008	The Shortwave Set	Replica Sun Machine: Released: May 2008; Label: Wall of Sound	viola, synths, atmospheres: album/various
2010	Manic Street Preachers	Postcards from a Young Man: Released: September 2010; Label: Columbia Records	keyboards, noise: "Auto-Intoxication"
2020	Kelly Lee Owens	Inner Song: Released: September 2020; Label: Smalltown Supersound	vocals, lyrics: "Corner of My Sky"

== Compositions ==
Year	Title	Medium	Performer(s)
1996	"I Shot Andy Warhol Suite"	Film theme	String section, arranged by Cale
1998	Dance Music	Ballet score	Ice Nine, arranged by Dave Soldier
2000	Saint Cyr	Film score	Various musicians, arranged by Randy Wolf

== See also ==
- The Velvet Underground
- Theatre of Eternal Music
- John Cale filmography
