= Seducing Down the Door =

Seducing Down the Door: A Collection 1970−1990

Compilation album by John Cale
- Released: 5 July 1994
- Recorded: 1970−1990
- Genre: Rock
- Length: 2:34:17
- Label: Rhino
- Producer: John Cale; Lewis Merenstein (Vintage Violence tracks); Chris Thomas (Paris 1919 tracks); Mike Thorne (Honi Soit tracks); Brian Eno (Words for the Dying and Wrong Way Up tracks); Lou Reed (Songs for Drella tracks)

John Cale chronology
Last Day on Earth (1994)	Seducing Down the Door: A Collection 1970−1990 (1994)	Antártida (1995)

Professional ratings
Review scores
Source	Rating
AllMusic	4.5/5 stars
Trouser Press	favourable

Seducing Down the Door: A Collection 1970−1990 is the second compilation album by Welsh musician John Cale, released by Rhino Records in July 1994. It featured songs from Cale's albums released between 1970 and 1990 (including songs from collaborative albums with Brian Eno, Lou Reed, and Terry Riley). It includes the songs "Jack the Ripper", an unreleased single from 1978, and "Temper", an outtake from The Academy in Peril album that originally appeared on a 1980 Warner Bros. sampler album titled Troublemakers.

== Track listing ==
Disc 1
No.	Title	Writer(s)	Original album	Length
1.	"The Protégé"	John Cale, Terry Riley	Church of Anthrax (1971)	2:56
2.	"Big White Cloud"	Cale	Vintage Violence (1970)	3:30
3.	"Amsterdam"	Cale	Vintage Violence (1970)	3:14
4.	"Days of Steam"	Cale	The Academy in Peril (1972)	2:01
5.	"Temper"	Cale	The Academy in Peril outtake	5:00
6.	"Dixieland and Dixie"	Cale	single (1971)	3:20
7.	"Child's Christmas in Wales"	Cale	Paris 1919 (1973)	3:23
8.	"Paris 1919"	Cale	Paris 1919 (1973)	4:05
9.	"Andalucia"	Cale	Paris 1919 (1973)	3:53
10.	"Fear Is a Man's Best Friend"	Cale	Fear (1974)	3:55
11.	"Gun"	Cale	Fear (1974)	8:06
12.	"(I Keep A) Close Watch"	Cale	Helen of Troy (1975)	3:26
13.	"Heartbreak Hotel"	Mae Boren Axton, Tommy Durden, Elvis Presley	Slow Dazzle (1975)	3:15
14.	"Dirty-Ass Rock 'N' Roll"	Cale	Slow Dazzle (1975)	4:46
15.	"Guts"	Cale	Slow Dazzle (1975)	3:32
16.	"The Jeweller"	Cale	Slow Dazzle (1975)	4:17
17.	"Pablo Picasso"	Jonathan Richman	Helen of Troy (1975)	3:23
18.	"Leaving It up to You"	Cale	Helen of Troy (1975)	4:33
19.	"Coral Moon"	Cale	Helen of Troy (1975)	2:15
20.	"Memphis"	Chuck Berry	Animal Justice (1977)	3:24

Disc 2
No.	Title	Writer(s)	Original album	Length
1.	"Jack the Ripper"	Cale	unreleased single (1978)	3:09
2.	"Hedda Gabler"	Cale	Animal Justice (1977)	8:12
3.	"Walkin' the Dog" (live)	Rufus Thomas	Sabotage/Live (1979)	4:05
4.	"Dead or Alive"	Cale	Honi Soit (1981)	3:53
5.	"Strange Times in Casablanca"	Cale	Honi Soit (1981)	4:17
6.	"Taking Your Life in Your Hands"	Cale	Music for a New Society (1982)	4:48
7.	"Thoughtless Kind"	Cale	Music for a New Society (1982)	2:44
8.	"Chinese Envoy"	Cale	Music for a New Society (1982)	3:11
9.	"Caribbean Sunset"	Cale	Caribbean Sunset (1984)	4:23
10.	"Waiting for the Man" (live)	Lou Reed	John Cale Comes Alive (1984)	4:43
11.	"Ooh La La"	Cale, Larry Sloman	John Cale Comes Alive (1984)	4:22
12.	"Everytime the Dogs Bark"	Cale, Sloman, David Young	Artificial Intelligence (1985)	4:17
13.	"Dying on the Vine"	Cale, Sloman	Artificial Intelligence (1985)	5:08
14.	"The Soul of Carmen Miranda"	Cale, Brian Eno	Words for the Dying (1989)	3:26
15.	"One Word"	Cale, Eno	Wrong Way Up (1990)	4:38
16.	"Cordoba"	Cale, Eno	Wrong Way Up (1990)	4:25
17.	"Trouble with Classicists"	Cale, Reed	Songs for Drella (1990)	3:44
18.	"Faces and Names"	Cale, Reed	Songs for Drella (1990)	4:12
Total length:				2:34:17
