= Paris 1919 =

Paris 1919 may refer to:

- Paris Peace Conference (1919–1920), the formal meeting of the victorious Allies after the end of World War I
- Paris 1919 (album), a 1973 album by musician John Cale
- Paris 1919 (song), a 1973 song by musician John Cale
- Paris 1919: Six Months that Changed the World, a 2001 book by historian Margaret MacMillan
- Paris 1919, a Minneapolis-based avant-garde musical collective led by Chris Strouth

== See also ==
- 1919 in France
