= New York in the 1960s =

Box set by John Cale
- Released: 17 August 2004
- Genres: Drone, avant-garde, minimalist
- Length: 186:11
- Label: Table of the Elements

John Cale chronology
HoboSapiens (2003)	New York in the 1960s (2004)	Le Bataclan '72 (2004)

Professional ratings
Review scores
Source	Rating
Allmusic	3.5/5 stars

New York in the 1960s is an album by Welsh-born musician John Cale. It was released in August 2004 on American independent label Table of the Elements. The recordings were released as three individual CDs initially, later it was issued as a three-CD box set of Cale's recordings from the 1960s. There is also a 5 LP version.

== Track listing ==
Disc 1

1. "Sun Blindness Music, for organ" – 31:37
2. "Summer Heat, for guitar" – 0:29
3. "The Second Fortress, for vox organ" – 10:38

Disc 2

1. "Dream Interpretation, for viola & violin" – 20:35
2. "Ex-Cathedra, for vox organ" – 5:04
3. "[untitled] for piano" – 12:30
4. "Carousel, for synthesizer" – 2:34
5. "A Midnight Rain of Green Wrens at the World's Tallest Building, for viola" – 3:20
6. "Hot Scoria, for guitar & cimbalom" – 9:20

Disc 3

1. "Stainless Steel Gamelan, cembalet & fretless guitar" – 10:24
2. "At About This Time Mozart Was Dead And Joseph Conrad Was Sailing the Seven Seas Learning English pt. 1, for wollensak, viola & guitar" – 26:29
3. "Terry's Cha-Cha, for ensemble" – 8:21
4. "After the Locust, for electric piano & thunder machine" – 4:19
5. "Big Apple Express, for viola, tape & voice" – 7:45
6. "Cold Starry Nights, for voice, sarinda & bowed cembalom" – 2:19
7. "Silent Shadows on Cinemaroc Island, for ensemble" – 8:42

== Personnel ==
- John Cale – viola, organ, piano, electric piano, guitar, electronics, cembalet
- Sterling Morrison – guitar
- Angus MacLise – cimbalom, tambourine, percussion
- Terry Jennings – soprano saxophone
- Tony Conrad – violin
- Jack Smith – voices
- New York Fire Department – voices
