= Close Watch: An Introduction to John Cale =

Compilation album by John Cale
- Released: 20 April 1999
- Genre: Rock
- Length: 1:07:56
- Label: Island
- Producer: John Cale

John Cale chronology
| Le Vent de la nuit (1999) | Close Watch: An Introduction to John Cale (1999) | The Unknown (1999) |

Professional ratings
Review scores
| Source | Rating |
|---|---|
| AllMusic | 4.5/5 stars |

Close Watch: An Introduction to John Cale is the third compilation album by the Welsh rock musician John Cale, released on 20 April 1999 by Island Records. It featured songs from Cale's albums released between 1973 and 1996.

== Track listing ==
All songs composed by John Cale, except where indicated.

| No. | Title | Writer(s) | Original album | Length |
|---|---|---|---|---|
| 1. | "Paris 1919" | | Paris 1919 (1973) | 4:06 |
| 2. | "Mr. Wilson" | | Slow Dazzle (1975) | 3:17 |
| 3. | "Leaving It up to You" | | Helen of Troy (1975) | 4:33 |
| 4. | "Dying on the Vine" | Cale, Larry Sloman | Fragments of a Rainy Season (1992) | 3:58 |
| 5. | "Guts" | | Slow Dazzle (1975) | 3:29 |
| 6. | "Set Me Free" | | Walking on Locusts (1996) | 4:12 |
| 7. | "Heartbreak Hotel" | Mae Boren Axton, Tommy Durden, Elvis Presley | Slow Dazzle (1975) | 3:12 |
| 8. | "Ship of Fools" | | Fear (1974) | 4:38 |
| 9. | "Cable Hogue" | | Helen of Troy (1975) | 3:28 |
| 10. | "Gun" | | Fear (1974) | 8:07 |
| 11. | "Riverbank" | | Honi Soit (1981) | 6:25 |
| 12. | "Child's Christmas in Wales" | | Paris 1919 (1973) | 3:20 |
| 13. | "Fear Is a Man's Best Friend" | | Fear (1974) | 3:52 |
| 14. | "If You Were Still Around" | | Music for a New Society (1982) | 3:28 |
| 15. | "Wilson Joliet" | | Honi Soit (1981) | 4:25 |
| 16. | "I Keep a Close Watch" | | Helen of Troy (1975) | 3:26 |
| Total length: | | | | 1:07:56 |
