= Antártida (album) =

Soundtrack album by John Cale
- Released: 25 September 1995
- Genre: Classical
- Length: 46:56
- Label: Les Disques du Crépuscule
- Producer: John Cale

John Cale chronology
N'oublie pas que tu vas mourir (1995)	Antártida (1995)	The Island Years (1996)

Antártida is the soundtrack album by the Welsh multi-instrumentalist and composer John Cale. It was released in September 1995 on Belgian independent label Les Disques du Crépuscule. It is the original music score for Manuel Huerga's film Antártida. On this album played several musicians, such as Sterling Morrison and Maureen Tucker from The Velvet Underground and Cale's collaborators Chris Spedding, Erik Sanko and David Soldier. It also featured one song ("Antarctica Starts Here") from Cale's 1973 album Paris 1919.

== Track listing ==
All tracks composed by John Cale, except where indicated.

1. "Flashback 1 Does Not Equal 1" − 1:27
2. "Antártida" − 3:05
3. "Velasco's Theme" − 1:14
4. "Maria's Appartement" − 1:06
5. "Flashback 1 Does Not Equal 2" − 1:27
6. "On the Waterfront" − 3:15
7. "Pasodoble Mortal" − 3:43
8. "Maria's Dream" − 1:08
9. "Bath" − 5:02
10. "Flashback 1 Does Not Equal 3" − 1:28
11. "Antarctica Starts Here" − 2:30
12. "Flashback 3" − 1:55
13. "Sunset" − 1:07
14. "Get Away" − 4:37
15. "Antarctica 1 Does Not Equal 4" − 1:27
16. "Antartida Starts Here" − 2:26
17. "Frame Up" − 1:22
18. "Barn" − 4:26
19. "People Who Died" (Jim Carroll, Brian Linsley, Stephen Linsley, Terrell Winn, Wayne Woods) − 2:42
20. "Flashback 1 Does Not Equal 5" − 1:29

== Personnel ==
- John Cale − vocals and piano
- Dan Buckholz − cello
- Cece Giannoti − guitar on "Pasodoble Mortal"
- Xavi Mezquita − trumpet on "Pasodoble Mortal"
- Sterling Morrison − guitar on "People Who Died"
- Guillermo Prats − electric bass on "Pasodoble Mortal"
- David Soldier − arranger and conductor on "Antártida"
- Chris Spedding − guitar on "People Who Died"
- Erik Sanko − bass on "People Who Died"
- Maureen Tucker − drums on "People Who Died"
- Maurice Villavecchina − accordion on "Pasodoble Mortal"
- Michael Weiss − drums on "Pasodoble Mortal"

== Credits ==
- Arranged By – John Cale (tracks: 1, 3 to 6, 8 to 20)
- Artwork – Hennebert*
- Cello [Cello Solos] – Dawn Buckholz
- Composed By – John Cale (tracks: 1 to 18, 20)
- Edited By [Digital Editing By] – Charles V.D.E.
- Engineer [All Midi And Piano Recordings], Technician [Additional Treatments] – Matt Donner
- Engineer [All Orchestral, Solo Cellos And Group Recordings] – Martin Brass
- Executive-Producer, Edited By [Final Assembly By] – Jean-Michel Reusser
- Photography By – Deborah Feingold, Maria Espeus
- Producer – John Cale (tracks: 1 to 6, 8 to 20)
