= Paris 1919 (song) =

Song by John Cale

from the album Paris 1919
- Released: 25 February 1973
- Recorded: 1972–1973
- Studio: Sunwest Studios (Los Angeles)
- Genre: Baroque pop; chamber pop
- Length: 4:07
- Label: Reprise
- Songwriter: John Cale
- Producer: Chris Thomas

Paris 1919 track listing
- 1. "Child's Christmas in Wales"; 2. "Hanky Panky Nohow"; 3. "The Endless Plain of Fortune"; 4. "Andalucia"; 5. "Macbeth"; 6. "Paris 1919"; 7. "Graham Greene"; 8. "Half Past France"; 9. "Antarctica Starts Here"

Official audio
- "Paris 1919" on YouTube

"Paris 1919" is a song written by the Welsh musician John Cale. It was released as the sixth track on his third solo studio album of the same name (1973).

== Recording ==
"Paris 1919" is the sixth song on Cale's third solo studio album, Paris 1919 (1973). The song's backing band was not credited until 2006 in the album's expanded version. The song's title and lyrics obliquely reference the Treaty of Versailles, signed in Paris in 1919 and which formally ended World War I, as well as the unresolved political and economic tensions within interwar continental Europe.

== Alternate version ==
In 2006, a reissue of Paris 1919 was released, featuring bonus tracks – rehearsals and alternate versions, and a hidden track (an instrumental of "Macbeth"). "Paris 1919" received two alternate versions, a string mix and a piano mix. The string mix replaced all the instruments with string instruments. It lasts 22 seconds longer. The piano mix on the other hand lasts a full 2 minutes and 2 seconds longer. It replaces all of the instruments with pianos. The song cuts off at the 4:22 mark and the remaining 1:47 is just silence.

== Release and critical reception ==
Following Paris 1919's release in 1973, the reviews were mostly favourable. Rolling Stone compares "Paris 1919" to Harry Nilsson's "Mourning Glory Story".

Let It Rock said the song, "begins with urgent cello cross-rhythms to tell the tale of a female ghost appearing out of a clock at irregular intervals, then erupts into a chorus of 'you're a ghost/La la la la/I'm the church and I've come/To claim you with my iron drum' which is weirdly reminiscent of the Bee Gees' "New York Mining Disaster". The possibility of plagiarism doesn't arise because Cale is deliberately dealing with bizarre juxtapositions."

Musikexpress named it the 351st greatest song of all time, calling it "lyrically demanding, melodically complex, kitsch-free baroque pop of the highest quality".

== Personnel ==
- John Cale - vocals, piano
- The UCLA Symphony Orchestra – strings
- Joel Druckman, Esq. – orchestra manager
