= Andalucia (John Cale song) =

Song by John Cale

from the album Paris 1919
- Released: 25 February 1973
- Studio: Sunwest (Los Angeles)
- Genre: Art rock; baroque pop
- Length: 3:54
- Label: Reprise
- Songwriter: John Cale
- Producer: Chris Thomas

Official audio
- "Andalucia" on YouTube

"Andalucia" is a song written by the Welsh musician John Cale, released as the fourth track on his third solo studio album Paris 1919 (1973). It was covered in 1990 by the American indie rock band Yo La Tengo for their fourth studio album Fakebook.

== Recording ==
"Andalucia" is the fourth song on Cale's third solo studio album Paris 1919 (1973). The backing band for the song, and the rest of the album were not credited until 2006 in the expanded version. The lyrics are interpreted in multiple ways – either about Andalusia, Spain, or a person from that area. The lyrics are delivered as though Cale is about to break down, giving the song a delicate feel.

== Release and critical reception ==
Following Paris 1919's release in 1973, the reviews were mostly favourable. Rolling Stone calls "Andalucia" the "most beautiful" song on the album.

== Alternative version ==
In 2006, a reissue of Paris 1919 was released, featuring bonus tracks – rehearsals and alternative versions, and a hidden track (an instrumental version of "Macbeth"). The "Andalucia" rehearsal track is mostly an instrumental, only featuring Cale singing a small amount of the lyrics. It was recorded earlier than the album version – showing Cale's original visualisation for the song – far more delicate.

== Personnel ==
Musicians

- John Cale – vocals, acoustic guitar, keyboards
- Lowell George – electric & acoustic guitar
- Wilton Felder – bass guitar
- Richie Hayward – drums

== Yo La Tengo ==
Yo La Tengo covered "Andalucia" in 1990, on Fakebook, which mostly features covers. The instruments are more low key in this version, placing more emphasis on Ira Kaplan's delivery of the lyrics. It has been described as "only slightly less fragile" lyrics-wise, likely due to Ira Kaplan's American accent as opposed to John Cale's Welsh.
