= Honi Soit (album) =

Studio album by John Cale
- Released: 9 March 1981
- Recorded: 1980
- Studio: CBS 30th Street (New York City); Mediasound (New York City)
- Genre: Art rock; post-punk; new wave
- Length: 37:45
- Label: A&M
- Producer: Mike Thorne

John Cale chronology
Sabotage/Live (1979)	Honi Soit (1981)	Music for a New Society (1982)

John Cale studio album chronology
Helen of Troy (1975)	Honi Soit (1981)	Music for a New Society (1982)

Singles from Honi Soit
- 1. "Dead or Alive"/"Honi Soit" Released: 1981

Honi Soit is the seventh solo studio album by the Welsh rock musician John Cale, released on 9 March 1981 by A&M Records, and was his first studio album in six years following 1975's Helen of Troy. It was recorded and mixed by Harvey Goldberg at CBS 30th Street and Mediasound in New York City with the intention of making a more commercial album with record producer Mike Thorne at the helm, Thorne would soon be known for his work with Soft Cell. "Dead or Alive" was the only single released from the album but it did not chart. However, Honi Soit is Cale's only studio album to date to chart on the US Billboard 200, peaking at No. 154.

In 1991, Universal re-released the album on CD. It only included the songs from the original LP. This same version of the album has been reissued twice: in 2004 and 2018.

== Content ==
All of the tracks on Honi Soit were written by John Cale, except for "Streets of Laredo", an American cowboy ballad arranged by Cale in which a dying ranger tells his story to another cowboy. The track "Need Your Loving" was left off the album in favour of "Riverbank".

The American artist Andy Warhol suggested that the album should be called John and Yoko, and provided the cover art, in black and white, but against Warhol's wishes Cale colorized it, a decision recounted by Cale on the song "A Dream" from his 1990 collaboration studio album with Lou Reed about Warhol, Songs for Drella. In a tongue-in-cheek allusion to the song "Fighter Pilot", the credits on the sleeve give each of the musicians a mock military aviation role, with Cale described as "flight surgeon". The album's title is an abbreviation of the phrase Honi soit qui mal y pense (French: "shame upon him who thinks evil of it"), the motto of the British chivalric Order of the Garter.

== Critical reception ==
Professional ratings
Review scores
Source	Rating
AllMusic	3/5 stars
Trouser Press	(mixed)

Robert A. Hull of Creem wrote that "Once again on Honi Soit – from the opening trumpet blast of "Dead or Alive" to the final pounding of the drums on "Magic & Lies" – Cale evokes the epochal – this time as a series of battles, as a pure declaration of war. Like Lou Reed's Street Hassle, it's a work on which the artist finally reveals himself, concealing his tracks yet at the same time blowing his cover." Stephen Holden of The New York Times called the album "excellent", and described Cale as "one of the godfathers of new-wave music, [who] has accomplished the seemingly impossible feat of reconciling the ferocity of postpunk rock with the stateliness of European classicism."

In a retrospective review for AllMusic, critic Mark Deming said that "Honi Soit rivals Fear as the most lividly uncomfortable album in Cale's catalog, and that's saying something." Lindsay Zoladz of The New York Times called Honi Soit a "wild post-punk album" and wrote: "Cale's approach was so consistently ahead of its time that he was easily able to slot into various emerging genres as the decades went on. Fear, along with his production for [Patti] Smith and the Stooges, heralded him as a godfather of punk, while Honi Soit proves he understood post-punk and new wave just as intuitively."

== Track listing ==
All tracks are written by John Cale, except where noted.

Side one
No.	Title	Writer(s)	Length
1.	"Dead or Alive"		3:51
2.	"Strange Times in Casablanca"		4:13
3.	"Fighter Pilot"		3:10
4.	"Wilson Joliet"		4:23
5.	"Streets of Laredo"	Traditional; arranged by John Cale	3:34

Side two
No.	Title	Length
6.	"Honi Soit (La Première Leçon de Français)"	3:20
7.	"Riverbank"	6:26
8.	"Russian Roulette"	5:15
9.	"Magic & Lies"	3:26
Total length:		37:45

== Personnel ==
Credits are adapted from the Honi Soit liner notes.

Musicians

- John Cale ("flight surgeon") – lead vocals; guitar; keyboards; viola
- Jim Goodwin ("gunner") – keyboards; synthesizer; backing vocals
- Sturgis Nikides ("hellcat") – guitar; backing vocals
- Robert Medici ("navigator") – drums; backing vocals
- Peter Muny ("wing and prop") – bass guitar; backing vocals
- John Gatchell – trumpet
- Bomberettes (members of Mo-dettes) – backing vocals on "Fighter Pilot"

Production and artwork

- Mike Thorne – producer ("computer processing")
- Harvey Goldberg – recording; mixing
- Carl Beatty – engineer
- Harold Tarowsky – assistant engineer
- Jane Friedman – management ("propaganda")
- John Vogel – graphic design
- Andy Warhol – cover concept
- Fred Lorey – photography
- Warren Frank – "flight engineer"
- Louis Tropia – "logistics"

== See also ==
- List of albums released in 1981
- John Cale's discography
