= Fantastic Star =

Studio album by Marc Almond
- Released: 19 February 1996
- Recorded: 1993–1996
- Studios: Red Bus Studios, London; The Stereo Society, New York; Skyline, New York; GCHQ, London.
- Genre: Rock
- Length: 76:53
- Labels: Mercury, Some Bizzare
- Producers: Mike Thorne, Martyn Ware, Mike Hedges

Marc Almond chronology
Absinthe (1993)	Fantastic Star (1996)	Open All Night (1999)

Singles from Fantastic Star
- 1. "Adored and Explored" Released: May 1995; 2. "The Idol" Released: July 1995; 3. "Child Star" Released: December 1995; 4. "Brilliant Creatures" / "Out There" Released: February 1996

Fantastic Star is the ninth studio album by the British singer/songwriter Marc Almond. It was released in 1996 and reached number fifty-four on the UK Albums Chart. It includes the singles "Adored and Explored", "The Idol", "Child Star" and the double A-side "Brilliant Creatures" / "Out There". The album was Almond's last on a major record label until 2007's Stardom Road.

Accompanied by studio musicians and collaborators – specifically guitarist Neal X and John Coxon – Almond recorded the songs for the album over several years. This was due to his changing record labels and professional and personal difficulties. It was recorded at Red Bus Studios, London, The Stereo Society, New York, Skyline, New York, and GCHQ, London. Receiving mixed to positive reviews, the album was originally released as a CD and cassette in February 1996. The album was not reissued until 2023. The artwork was designed by 950 Fahrenheit with a cover photograph by Mike Owen.

== Background ==
Originally the album was intended to be released by WEA UK (who had released Almond's Tenement Symphony album in 1991) and be produced by Soft Cell's former producer Mike Thorne under the working title Urban Velvet reflecting the Glam meets Electronica fusion. However, Almond's manager Stevo Pearce had the project moved to Phonogram Records who decided to bring new producers and remixers to the project and even added new songs to the original track list. Beatmasters, Martyn Ware and others reworked or created new songs to varying degrees of satisfaction or displeasure for Almond, and this would be the last album he released via a major label for over a decade. Almond had addiction problems during the recording of this album, which he documents in his 1999 autobiography Tainted Life.

== Release ==
The first single from the album, "Adored and Explored" (remixed by the Beatmasters), reached No. 25 in the UK singles chart in May 1995. Despite a radio jingle version for the then top rated Chris Evans Radio 1 Breakfast Show, second single "The Idol" just missed the UK top 40, stalling at No. 44 in July 1995. December 1995 saw the third single release, "Child Star", which just missed the top 40, stalling at No. 41. Just before the album was released in February 1996, a further double A-side single "Brilliant Creatures"/"Out There" was released reaching No. 76.

== The Artist's Cut re-release ==
The album was re-issued in the UK for Record Store Day on 22 April 2023. This was the first time the album had been available on vinyl and was released over two LPs. This was subtitled 'the Artist's Cut' as Almond had re-evaluated all of the tracks himself, including those that didn't make the album at the time but later appeared as B-sides of singles. Two songs that featured on the original CD release were removed: "The Idol Part 2 All Gods Fall" and "Shining Brightly", which Almond felt 'never really belonged' on the album. They were replaced by "The User", "Christmas in Vegas" and "My Guardian Angel". Almond also chose the new artwork, selecting his favourite shot from 1995 sessions by fashion photographer Zanna. The release was newly mastered for 180 gm vinyl at Abbey Road Studios and came with two fully printed inner bags with lyrics and a new design by Philip Marshall.

== Reception ==
Professional ratings
Review scores
Source	Rating
AllMusic	3/5 stars
The Encyclopedia of Popular Music	3/5 stars

Fantastic Star received good to mixed reviews from the majority of critics. The album was released to disappointing sales reaching UK No. 54.

== Track listing ==
All tracks are written by Marc Almond and Neal Whitmore; except where indicated.

No.	Title	Writer(s)	Length
1.	"Caged"		5:38
2.	"Out There"	Almond	5:37
3.	"We Need Jealousy"	Almond, Steve Nieve	4:07
4.	"The Idol (Parts 1 & 2 All Gods Fall)"		9:03
5.	"Baby Night Eyes"	Almond, Steve Nieve	3:39
6.	"Adored and Explored"	Almond, John Coxon	3:53
7.	"Child Star"		4:04
8.	"Looking for Love (In All the Wrong Places)"	Almond	5:43
9.	"Addicted"	Almond, John Coxon	4:07
10.	"The Edge of Heartbreak"	Almond, John Coxon	4:49
11.	"Love to Die For"	Almond	4:02
12.	"Betrayed"	Almond, John Coxon	3:20
13.	"On the Prowl"		3:53
14.	"Come in Sweet Assassin"	Almond	4:59
15.	"Brilliant Creatures"		5:28
16.	"Shining Brightly"	Almond, Jane Rollink, Kevin White	4:31

== Personnel ==
- Marc Almond – vocals, synthesizer, background vocals
- Neal X – guitar
- Rick Shaffer – guitar
- Chris Spedding – guitar
- Martyn Ware – keyboards
- B.J. Nelson, Betty, Morton Street Local 10014 – background vocals
- David Johansen – harmonica on "We Need Jealousy", "Adored and Explored" and "Love to Die For"
- John Cale – piano on "Love to Die For"
- Andrew David Ross – guitar on "The Edge of Heartbreak"
- Jeremy Stacey – percussion on "The Edge of Heartbreak"
- Mandy Drummond, Chris Pitsillides – viola on "The Edge of Heartbreak"
- Anne Stephenson, Gini Ball, Johnny Taylor – violin on "The Edge of Heartbreak"

== Chart performance ==
Chart (1996)	Peak position
UK Albums (Official Charts)	54
