= Even Cowgirls Get the Blues (John Cale album) =

Live album by John Cale
- Released: 1987
- Recorded: 1978 and 1979
- Venues: CBGB, New York City
- Genre: Rock
- Language: English
- Label: ROIR
- Producer: John Cale

John Cale chronology
Artificial Intelligence (1985)	Even Cowgirls Get the Blues (1987)	Words for the Dying (1989)

Professional ratings
Review scores
Source	Rating
AllMusic	4/5 stars

Even Cowgirls Get the Blues is the third live album by the Welsh musician John Cale. It was originally released on LP in 1986 and then later reissued on cassette in 1987 with a different cover and drastically altered track listing. In 1991 it was reissued on CD with a third cover design, but with contents identical to the cassette edition. It was recorded in CBGB club in New York between 1978 and 1979 with three former members of Patti Smith Group, bassist Ivan Kral, keyboardist Bruce Brody and drummer Jay Dee Daugherty. The LP version contains different track listing than CD.

According to the sleeve notes, the first four tracks were recorded live on 28 December 1978. The other four tracks on 31 December 1979, with "Memphis" from January 1977. The venue for both gigs was CBGB's in New York. However, guitarist Ritchie Fliegler disagrees. He states: "The first five songs are the Judy, Kral, JD, Bruce and me band. From when, I don't remember. However the liner notes say it's the first four songs - This is absolutely incorrect - it's the first five. The last three songs: "Somebody", "Decade" and "Magic" are another gang altogether".

== Track listing ==
All tracks composed by John Cale; except where indicated

=== CD version ===
1. "Dance of the Seven Veils"
2. "Helen of Troy"
3. "Casey at the Bat"
4. "Even Cowgirls Get the Blues"
5. "Don't Know Why She Came"
6. "Somebody Should Have Told Her"
7. "Decade"
8. "Magic & Lies"

=== LP version ===
Side A

1. "Dance of the Seven Veils"
2. "Helen of Troy"
3. "Casey at the Bat"
4. "Even Cowgirls Get the Blues"
5. "Jack the Ripper at the Moulin Rouge"

Side B

1. "Dead or Alive"
2. "Somebody Should Have Told Her"
3. "Instrumental for New Years 1980" ("Decade")
4. "Magic & Lies"
5. "Memphis" (Chuck Berry)

== Personnel ==
- John Cale − vocals, guitar, electric piano, viola
- Ritchie Fliegler − guitar
- Ivan Kral − bass
- Bruce Brody − keyboards
- Jay Dee Daugherty − drums (tracks 1–4)
- Robert Medici − drums (tracks 5–8)
- Judy Nylon − vocals, narration

Technical

- Jim Flynn Curtin - engineer, mixing
