= HoboSapiens =

Studio album by John Cale
- Released: 6 October 2003
- Recorded: MediaLuna, New York; Globe Studios, New York; Engine Studios, Chicago; D's Attic, London; SF Soundworks, San Francisco
- Genre: Art rock
- Length: 60:15 (excl. hidden track); 64:49 (incl. hidden track)
- Language: English
- Label: EMI
- Producers: John Cale and Nick Franglen

John Cale chronology
5 Tracks EP (2003)	HoboSapiens (2003)	Le Bataclan '72 (2004)

Singles from HoboSapiens
- 1. "Things" Released: 13 October 2003

HoboSapiens is a solo studio album by the Welsh musician John Cale, his first album since 1996's Walking on Locusts. HoboSapiens was released by EMI in October 2003, and was preceded by the EP 5 Tracks in May 2003. A single was released for "Things" shortly after the album's release. Cale co-produced the album with Nick Franglen of Lemon Jelly, and Brian Eno provided the drum loop for the song "Bicycle". The album was met with widespread critical acclaim.

== Release and reception ==
Professional ratings
Aggregate scores
Source	Rating
Metacritic	89/100
Review scores
Source	Rating
AllMusic	4.5/5 stars
Blender	3.5/5 stars
Entertainment Weekly	A−
The Guardian	4/5 stars
Mojo	4.5/5 stars
Pitchfork	6.5/10
Q	4.5/5 stars
Rolling Stone	4/5 stars
Stylus Magazine	A
Uncut	5/5 stars

Between the release of Walking on Locusts in 1996 and the recording of HoboSapiens, John Cale worked on film scores, classical pieces, and composed the score Dance Music for the tribute ballet Nico. In a 2004 interview with Time Out New York, Cale attributed the quick, streamlined recording of HoboSapiens to his soundtrack endeavours and modern studio advances, stating that "The songs on Hobo are different from my past stuff in that nearly all of them were written in the studio. I don't like being in the studio, so I'd try to get things done as fast as possible and run to the gym. New recording methods are gratifying — you get to where you want to go very swiftly."

HoboSapiens was released by EMI in Europe on 6 October 2003, and nearly a year later in the United States by Or Music on 7 September 2004. The album was released to mostly positive reviews; at Metacritic, which assigns a normalized rating out of 100 based on reviews from mainstream critics, the album has received "universal acclaim" with a score of 89, based on 16 reviews. AllMusic's Thom Jurek stated that "Cale's reentry into the world of pop music is a contentious and accessible one. This is the Welsh iconoclast at his most elegant, energetic, and innovative," while Brian James of PopMatters claimed that "HoboSapiens is dense and difficult for much of its running time, but the challenge comes from following the author through his many compositional twists rather than sitting through passages that drone on far too long."

A CD single was released for "Things" with the additional album track "Things X" in mid-October 2003. A re-recorded version of "Set Me Free", originally found on the album Walking on Locusts, appears as a hidden track in the CD's pregap on European pressings of the album, while the song was issued as a bonus track on North American pressings.

== Track listing ==
All tracks are written by John Cale.

No.	Title	Length
0.	"Set Me Free" (Pregap hidden track on European CD editions)	4:32
1.	"Zen"	6:03
2.	"Reading My Mind"	4:11
3.	"Things"	3:36
4.	"Look Horizon"	5:40
5.	"Magritte"	4:58
6.	"Archimedes"	4:40
7.	"Caravan"	6:43
8.	"Bicycle"	5:05
9.	"Twilight Zone"	3:49
10.	"Letter from Abroad"	5:10
11.	"Things X"	4:50
12.	"Over Her Head"	5:22

U.S. CD edition bonus track
No.	Title	Length
13.	"Set Me Free"	4:32

Japanese CD edition bonus tracks
No.	Title	Length
13.	"Where the Creepyboyz Sing"	4:35
14.	"Reading My Mind" (Parsley Sound Remix)	4:59
15.	"Set Me Free"	4:32

== Release history ==
Country	Date	Label	Format	Catalogue #
United Kingdom	6 October 2003	EMI	CD	591 711 2 / 593 909 2
Japan	6 November 2003	Toshiba-EMI	CD	TOCP-66226
United States	7 September 2004	Or Music	CD	OR 804042

== Personnel ==
- John Cale - keyboards, guitars, electric viola, viola, vocals, backing vocals, samples, bass, harmonium
- Andy Green - guitar, samples, additional production
- Erik Sanko - bass, slack dulcimer
- Joe Gore - guitar
- Emil Miland - cello
- Ryan Coseboom - samples
- Mikael "Count" Eldridge - drum loops, samples
- Marco Giovino - drums, percussion
- Roberto, Daniele, Alba Clemente, Giovani - Italian voices
- Lance Doss - guitars, backing vocals
- John Kurzweig - guitars
- Joel Mark - guitars, bass
- Jeff Eyrich - bass
- Bill Swartz - drums
- Eden Cale - spoken words
- Dimitri Tikovoï - samples
- Brian Foreman - bass
- Shelley Harland - samples
- Lisa Bielawa, Elizabeth Farnum, Alexandra Montano, Gayla Morgan - atonal voices
- Brian Eno - drum loops on "Bicycle"

Technical

- Photography - Jon Shard
- Art direction and design - Rick Myers
- Executive producer - Nita Scott
- Recorded at MediaLuna, New York City; Globe Studios, New York City; Engine Studios, Chicago; D's Attic, London; and SF Soundworks, San Francisco
- Mixed at Eden Studios, London
