= Dance Music (album) =

Soundtrack album by John Cale
- Released: 1998
- Recorded: Autumn 1997
- Genre: Classical, rock
- Length: 67:25
- Label: Detour Records
- Producer: John Cale, Jean-Michel Reusser

John Cale chronology
Eat/Kiss: Music for the Films by Andy Warhol (1997)	Dance Music (1998)	Close Watch: An Introduction to John Cale (1999)

Professional ratings
Review scores
Source	Rating
Allmusic	3/5 stars

Dance Music is the soundtrack album by the Welsh multi-instrumentalist John Cale composed for a ballet about Nico performed by the dancers of Scapino Ballet Rotterdam. The music was played by Ice Nine. The choreography of Scapino Ballet was conceived and directed by Ed Wubbe. The premiere took place in Rotterdam on 4 October 1997. Most of the songs were performed by a nine-piece ensemble Ice Nine, (except "Ari Sleepy Too" and "Nibelungen" by Nico and "España" by Cale on piano). "Nibelungen" is a track that Cale arranged for Nico's The Marble Index album.

It was then released on CD in 1998 on Detour Records label.

In a retrospective review, AllMusic wrote that the result although no showing any obvious connection to Nico, "displays a variety of colors and moods, ranging from pop to more classical styles, and often reveals a spare beauty".

== Track listing ==
All tracks composed by John Cale, except "Ari Sleepy Too" and "Nibelungen" by Nico.

1. "Intro" − 4:13
2. "New York Underground" − 3:52
3. "Night Club Theme" − 2:08
4. "Modelling" − 10:22
5. "Out of China" − 5:04
6. "Death Camp" − 3:39
7. "Ari Sleepy Too" − 4:44
8. "Iceberg I" − 7:39
9. "Jim" − 5:09
10. "Iceberg II" − 8:01
11. "España" − 9:48
12. "Nibelungen" − 2:44

== Personnel ==
- John Cale − piano
- Tineke de Jong − violin
- Jan Schoonenberg − viola
- Ernst Grapperhause − viola
- Baptist Kervers − viola
- Marjolein Meijer − cello
- Jasper Teule − double bass
- Corrie van Binsbergen − guitar
- Marc van de Geer − piano, synthesizer
- Arend Niks − percussion
- Dave Soldier − string arrangements
