= Hitting the Ground =

Studio album by Gordon Gano
- Released: August 13, 2002
- Recorded: 2002
- Studio: Carriage House Studios, Stamford, Connecticut; Big House, Manhattan, New York; ICP Recording Studios, Brussels; Mad Hatter Studios, Los Angeles; A&M Studios, Hollywood; John & Stu's Place, Seattle, Washington; Nine Lives; Mission; Colorado Sound Recording Studios, Denver; The Roof, New York City
- Genre: Rock
- Label: Instinct Records
- Producer: Warren Bruleigh, Gordon Gano

Hitting the Ground is Violent Femmes member Gordon Gano's debut solo studio album. It was produced by Warren Bruleigh and released in 2002. Gano wrote the songs for a film of the same name.

Each song was performed by a different artist. Gano says that the songs were written with no particular performer in mind, but he is very happy that each performer made his or her song his or her own. Lou Reed rewrote some of the lyrics, and was given partial writing credit for "Catch 'Em In the Act." Gordon's sister Cynthia Gayneau sang "Merry Christmas Brother" after Joan Baez turned it down. They Might Be Giants performed and produced their song, "Darlin' Allison," by themselves. John Cale recorded "Don't Pretend," solo on piano and vocals.

== Critical reception ==
Hitting the Ground received mostly favorable reviews from critics. Some critics, however, did give it mixed reviews, such as Eric Carr, who wrote in Pitchfork that "none of these tracks are all that interesting beyond a listen or two."

Professional ratings
Aggregate scores
Source	Rating
Metacritic	(63%)
Review scores
Source	Rating
AllMusic	3/5 stars
Pitchfork Media	(4.9/10)
The Guardian	5/5 stars
Robert Christgau	(choice cut)

== Track listing ==
All songs written by Gordon Gano, except "Catch 'Em In the Act" by Gano and Lou Reed.

1. "Hitting the Ground"
  - PJ Harvey - vocals and guitar solo
2. "Oh Wonder"
  - Mary Lou Lord - acoustic guitar and vocals
3. "Make It Happen"
  - Gordon Gano - vocals
4. "Don't Pretend"
  - John Cale - piano and vocals
5. "Catch 'Em In the Act"
  - Lou Reed - vocals and guitar (right speaker)
6. "So It Goes"
  - Linda Perry - vocals
7. "Run"
  - Frank Black - vocals
8. "Darlin' Allison"
  - They Might Be Giants - vocals and all instruments
9. "Merry Christmas Brother"
  - Cynthia Gayneau - vocals
10. "It's Money"
  - Gordon Gano - vocals, Martha Wainwright - vocals
11. "Hitting the Ground"
  - Gordon Gano - vocals, PJ Harvey - guitar solo

== Personnel ==
Musicians, in addition to the above:

- Frank Ferrer - drums (all tracks except 4, 8)
- Lonnie Hillyer - bass (tracks 2, 6)
- Melora Creager - cello (track 2)
- Brendan Ryan - keyboards (track 10)
- PJ O'Connor - backing vocals (track 10)
- Hope Debates - backing vocals (track 10)

Production

- Producer - Warren Bruleigh (all songs except "Darlin' Allison," produced by They Might Be Giants)
- Michael White, Irwin Autique, Martin Brass, Larry Mah, John Goodmanson, Warren Bruleigh, Steve Rosenthal, Alex Reed, Michael W. Douglass, Nicola Stemmer, Oliver Strauss, Rob Lewis - engineer
- Dave P. Moore - executive producer
- Dave Heath - cover photograph "Vengeful Sister, Chicago"
