= Poptical Illusion =

Studio album by John Cale
- Released: 14 June 2024
- Studio: ARM (Los Angeles)
- Genre: Electronic
- Length: 63:59
- Labels: Double Six; Domino
- Producers: John Cale; Nita Scott

John Cale chronology
Mercy (2023)	Poptical Illusion (2024)

Singles from Poptical Illusion
- 1. "How We See the Light" Released: 26 March 2024; 2. "Shark-Shark" Released: 8 May 2024

Poptical Illusion (stylised as POPtical uoᴉsnllI) is the eighteenth studio album by the Welsh musician and composer John Cale, released on 14 June 2024 by Double Six and Domino. In contrast to his previous album, Mercy (2023), which featured many collaborators at different studios, Poptical Illusion was produced by Cale along with his manager Nita Scott in his Los Angeles studio with Cale performing most of the instruments.

== Background ==
On 26 March 2024 the first single from the album, "How We See the Light", was released along with a music video directed by Pepi Ginsberg. On 8 May the second single, "Shark-Shark", was released with a music video directed by Abigail Portner. On 19 August the third single, "Davies and Wales" was released along with a music video directed by Jethro Waters. Two tracks – "Beethoven in the Old West" and "News of Nicholas" – are only available on a 7" bonus single that comes with the limited edition 2LP version of the album.

== Critical reception ==
Professional ratings
Aggregate scores
Source	Rating
Metacritic	85/100
Review scores
Source	Rating
AllMusic	4/5 stars
The Arts Desk	4/5 stars
The Guardian	4/5 stars
The Line of Best Fit	9/10
Mojo	4/5 stars
musicOMH	4.5/5 stars
Paste	7.7/10
Record Collector	4/5 stars
Spin	B+
Uncut	9/10

=== Year-end lists ===
Select year-end rankings for POPtical Illusion
Publication/critic	Accolade	Rank	Ref.
MOJO	The Best Albums Of 2024	28	
Uncut	80 Best Albums of 2024	21	

== Track listing ==
All tracks are written by John Cale.

Poptical Illusion track listing
No.	Title	Length
1.	"God Made Me Do It (Don't Ask Me Again)"	4:48
2.	"Davies and Wales"	4:15
3.	"Calling You Out"	4:49
4.	"Edge of Reason"	5:23
5.	"I'm Angry"	5:25
6.	"How We See the Light"	4:45
7.	"Company Commander"	4:07
8.	"Setting Fires"	5:40
9.	"Shark-Shark"	5:00
10.	"Funkball the Brewster"	5:34
11.	"All to the Good"	4:30
12.	"Laughing in My Sleep"	5:45
13.	"There Will Be No River"	3:58
Total length:		63:59

Bonus 7" tracks
No.	Title	Length
13.	"Beethoven in the Old West"
14.	"News of Nicholas"

Japanese edition bonus tracks
No.	Title	Length
14.	"Running Out"
15.	"Invention of Language"

Notes

- "All to the Good" is omitted from the vinyl versions, but is available with purchase through an MP3/WAV download card, along with an alternate mix of "Shark-Shark".

== Personnel ==
- John Cale – vocals, synthesizers, production (all tracks); drums (tracks 1–4, 6–12), bass (1–3, 6–10, 12), piano (1, 2, 13), organ (2–5, 9, 10), fretless bass (4), Empirical Egyptian Scale piano (6), noises (7, 8), sampler (7, 10, 13), guitar solo (8); guitars, SampleTron (9); electric keyboard (11), electric piano (12), bass organ (13)
- Nita Scott – production (all tracks), background vocals (track 3), keyboards (4, 8, 12), samples (4, 12), programming (4), drum programming (8), drums (10, 12); noises, sampler (10); bass (11)
- Dustin Boyer – recording (all tracks), guitar (tracks 1–3, 6, 7, 9), acoustic guitar (5), noises (7)
- Seven Davis Jr. – mixing (tracks 1, 3, 4, 11)
- Mikaelin "Blue" Bluespruce – mixing (tracks 2, 5–8, 10, 12, 13)
- Justin Raisen – mixing (track 9)
- Mike Bozzi – mastering
- Björn Copeland – artwork
- Rob Carmichael – design

== Charts ==
Chart performance for Poptical Illusion
Chart (2024)	Peak position
Austrian Albums (Ö3 Austria)	38
Belgian Albums (Ultratop Flanders)	79
Belgian Albums (Ultratop Wallonia)	129
German Albums (Offizielle Top 100)	45
Portuguese Albums (AFP)	145
Spanish Albums (Promusicae)	91
Scottish Albums (Official Charts)	27
Swiss Albums (Schweizer Hitparade)	78
UK Album Downloads (Official Charts)	80
UK Albums Sales (OCC)	32
UK Independent Albums (Official Charts)	10
