= MFANS =

M:FANS

Studio album by John Cale
- Released: 22 January 2016
- Recorded: 2013–2015
- Studio: A.R.M. Studio, Los Angeles, CA
- Genre: Experimental rock, industrial rock, electronic music
- Length: 53:43
- Label: Domino/Double Six, Electric Drone
- Producer: John Cale

John Cale chronology
Shifty Adventures in Nookie Wood (2012)	M:FANS (2016)	Mercy (2023)

Professional ratings
Aggregate scores
Source	Rating
Metacritic	76/100
Review scores
Source	Rating
AllMusic	4/5 stars
The Line of Best Fit	8/10
Mojo	4/5 stars
musicOMH	4/5 stars
Pitchfork	6.0/10
PopMatters	9/10
Q	4/5 stars
Record Collector	4/5 stars
Rolling Stone	4/5 stars
Under the Radar	8/10

M:FANS is the sixteenth solo studio album by Welsh musician and composer John Cale. It was released in January 2016 on the Double Six Records imprint of Domino Recording Company. Produced by Cale, it features new versions of songs from his 1982 album Music for a New Society. "Close Watch" was the album's lead single. It was released in November 2015 and features Amber Coffman from Dirty Projectors.

== Background ==
In a statement Cale recounted the process of making the album, and how the 2013 death of former bandmate and collaborator Lou Reed had informed it:

Losing Lou [too painful to understand] forced me to upend the entire recording process and begin again...a different perspective - a new sense of urgency to tell a story from a completely opposite point of view - what was once sorrow, was now a form of rage. A fertile ground for exorcism of things gone wrong and the realization they are unchangeable. From sadness came the strength of fire!!!

== Accolades ==
Publication	Accolade	Year	Rank
The Quietus	Albums of the Year 2016	2016	92

== Track listing ==
All tracks composed by John Cale; except where indicated.

1. "Prelude" – 2:17
2. "If You Were Still Around" (Cale, Sam Shepard) – 5:18
3. "Taking Your Life in Your Hands" – 5:43
4. "Thoughtless Kind" – 5:27
5. "Sanctus (Sanities Mix)" – 5:19
6. "Broken Bird" – 5:10
7. "Chinese Envoy" – 3:51
8. "Changes Made" – 3:54
9. "Library of Force" – 3:09
10. "Close Watch" – 5:15
11. "If You Were Still Around (Choir Reprise)" (Cale, Shepard) – 4:44
12. "Back to the End" – 3:34

== Personnel ==
- John Cale – vocals, voice, noises, keyboards, organ, piano, electric piano, guitar, electric guitar, programmed guitar, bass, programming, synthesizer, drums, viola, samples, production, recording, mixing
- Dustin Boyer – guitar, guitar synthesizer, bass, loops, programming, drum machine, drum programming, drums, mixing, recording
- Deantoni Parks – keyboards, noises, loops
- Joey Maramba – synth bass
- Ralph Esposito – synth bass
- Alex Thomas – drums, samples
- Matt Fish – cello
- Miguel Atwood-Ferguson – viola
- Thomas Lea – viola
- Jessy Greene – violin
- Chris Bautista – trumpet
- Amber Coffman – vocals on "Close Watch"
- New Direction Church – choir
- Benjamin Goodman – choir director
- William Arthur George Cale – voice
- Margaret Cale – voice

Technical

- Adam Moseley – mixing, recording
- Nita Scott – mixing, executive producer

== Charts ==
Chart (2016)	Peak position
Belgian Albums (Ultratop Flanders)	74
Belgian Albums (Ultratop Wallonia)	188
