= Animal Justice (extended play) =

EP by John Cale
- Released: September 1977
- Studio: Chalk Farm Studios (London)
- Genre: Art rock
- Length: 14:33
- Label: Illegal
- Producer: John Cale

John Cale EP chronology
Animal Justice (1977)	5 Tracks (2003)

Professional ratings
Review scores
Source	Rating
AllMusic	4/5 stars

Animal Justice is the debut extended play (EP) by the Welsh rock musician John Cale, released in September 1977 by Illegal Records. "Chickenshit" was Cale's response to his decapitation of a chicken during a gig in Croydon, South London on 24 April 1977. This prompted the vegetarian rhythm section of Mike Visceglia and Joe Stefko to walk off and leave Cale's band.

== Recording ==
Animal Justice was recorded at Chalk Farm Studios in London, England. Two other songs were recorded during these sessions, "Jack the Ripper (In the Moulin Rouge)" and "Ton Ton Macoute", but were not released.

== Content ==
The album cover is by the rock photographer Jill Furmanovsky.

== Release ==
Animal Justice was released in September 1977 by Illegal Records.

In 1999, this EP was released as bonus tracks on the reissue of the live album Sabotage/Live (1979).

== Track listing ==
1. "Chickenshit" (John Cale) − 3:25
2. "Memphis" (Chuck Berry) − 3:15
3. "Hedda Gabler" (Cale) − 7:53

== Personnel ==
- John Cale − vocals, guitar, piano, viola
- Ritchie Flieger − guitar, backing vocals on "Chickenshit"
- Jimmy Bain − bass guitar
- Bruce Brody − Moog synthesizer
- Kevin Currie − drums
- Chris Spedding — guitar on "Memphis"
- Jane Friedman − backing vocals on "Chickenshit"

"Chickenshit" contains part of a telephone conversation between Cale and Joe Stefko at the Portobello Hotel, London in April 1977.
