= The Academy in Peril =

Studio album by John Cale
- Released: 19 July 1972
- Recorded: Shipton Manor, Oxfordshire ("Brahms", "Intro" and "3 Orchestral Pieces"); St. Giles Church, Cripplegate, England ("Days of Steam" and "King Harry")
- Genre: Modern classical
- Length: 45:24
- Label: Reprise
- Producer: John Cale

John Cale chronology
Church of Anthrax (1971)	The Academy in Peril (1972)	Paris 1919 (1973)

Singles from The Academy in Peril
- 1. "Days of Steam / Legs Larry at the Television Centre" Released: 1972

The Academy in Peril is the second solo studio album by the Welsh musician John Cale, released on 19 July 1972 by Reprise Records.

== Content ==
Like his previous release, the Terry Riley collaboration Church of Anthrax, it is mostly instrumental. As the title suggests, the album was inspired by Cale's classical training.

"Temper", an outtake from the recording sessions, was later released on the promotional compilation Troublemakers. It was also released on the Seducing Down the Door compilation.

The cover concept and art were designed by Andy Warhol.

== Release ==
The Academy in Peril was released on 19 July 1972. "Days of Steam" b/w "Legs Larry at Television Centre" was released as a single in New Zealand and was also issued as a promo in the US.

== Critical reception ==
Professional ratings
Review scores
Source	Rating
AllMusic	4/5 stars
Christgau's Record Guide	B
The Rolling Stone Album Guide	3/5 stars
Spin Alternative Record Guide	6/10

In its retrospective review, AllMusic wrote "The predominantly instrumental release [...] steers away from the more grotesque classical/rock fusions at the time to find an unexpectedly happy and often compelling balance between the two sides."

== Track listing ==
All tracks written by John Cale.

Side A

1. "The Philosopher"
2. "Brahms"
3. "Legs Larry at Television Centre"
4. "The Academy in Peril"

Side B

5. "Intro/Days of Steam"
6. "3 Orchestral Pieces: Faust/The Balance/Captain Morgan's Lament"
7. "King Harry"
8. "John Milton"

== Personnel ==
- John Cale – bass, guitar, keyboards, viola
- Adam Miller – vocals
- Del Newman – drums
- Ron Wood – slide guitar on "The Philosopher"
- Legs Larry Smith – narration on "Legs Larry at Television Centre"
- The Royal Philharmonic Orchestra – "3 Orchestral Pieces: Faust/The Balance/Captain Morgan's Lament" and "John Milton"

Technical

- Jean Bois – mixing engineer
- Andy Warhol – artwork, cover concept
- Ed Thrasher – photography
