= Church of Anthrax =

Studio album by John Cale and Terry Riley
- Released: February 10, 1971
- Recorded: 1969
- Genre: Art rock; minimalism
- Length: 33:48
- Label: Columbia/CBS
- Producer: John Cale; John McClure

John Cale chronology
Vintage Violence (1970)	Church of Anthrax (1971)	The Academy in Peril (1972)

Terry Riley chronology
A Rainbow in Curved Air (1969)	Church of Anthrax (1971)	Persian Surgery Dervishes (1972)

Professional ratings
Review scores
Source	Rating
AllMusic	4/5 stars
Christgau's Record Guide	C
Irish Times	3/5 stars
Record Collector	3/5 stars

Church of Anthrax is a collaborative studio album by musicians John Cale and Terry Riley. It was recorded in the spring of 1969 but only released two years later, in February 1971 by record label CBS. It followed Riley's success with 1969's A Rainbow in Curved Air and Cale's influential work with the Velvet Underground.

The album was reissued and remastered in 2014.

== Music ==
The album blends "Riley's drones and patterns with a more muscular and melodic bent versed in both free jazz and experimental rock." Rolling Stone labeled it "largely stretched-out organ-heavy improvisations, a freak-out in slow motion." The album was mostly improvised on the spot, using two drummers, Bobby Gregg and Bobby Colomby. "The Soul of Patrick Lee" is the only vocal track on the album; all others are instrumentals. No singles were taken from the album.

Terry Riley noted that "John Cale and I had a lot of disagreements about the album, including the way it should sound and the way the material should go. During the last mixing session, John started feeding in a lot of extra guitar tracks over what we had done. That started to obscure some of my keyboard work that I thought should be heard. We had a disagreement about that, so I stopped going to the mixing sessions and they mixed it without me." However, in retrospect he stated that "over time, I’ve grown to like what they did."

In the early 1990s, the duo reunited in New York to record a Church of Anthrax II, but nothing materialized after it became clear that Cale only wanted to produce rather than perform on the album.

== Reception ==
Upon release, the album received mixed reception. Rolling Stone called it "one of the finest records to be released this year" but noted that it was largely ignored. Melody Maker described the album as "an uneven record, remarkable for one excellent Cale song ("The Soul of Patrick Lee") and the title track, a brilliantly dense piece of production. Cale's viola and bass and Riley's organ and saxophone create an impenetrable, organic vortex of sound. One of the all-time great headphones tracks, featuring the avant-garde at its funkiest." Robert Christgau of The Village Voice described it as "an album of keyboard doodles posing as improvisations."

Following its reissue in 2014, the Irish Times noted that the album was initially regarded as an "unsatisfying concoction between two motivating forces in the avant-garde," but suggested that "for those who like their minimalism spiked with broken glass (notably "Ides of March"), perhaps it’s time to open the door and walk down the aisle." Record Collector stated that the album "walked the thin line between boundary-pushing experimentation and indulgent jamming, only reaching a cathartic breakthrough on "The Hall of Mirrors in the Palace of Versailles"' shimmering collision between Cale’s piano and Riley’s tape-delayed soprano sax." The New York Times called it "an art-rock touchstone."

== Track listing ==
All tracks are written by John Cale and Terry Riley, except "The Soul of Patrick Lee" by John Cale.

Side A
No.	Title	Length
1.	"Church of Anthrax"	9:05
2.	"The Hall of Mirrors in the Palace at Versailles"	7:59

Side B
No.	Title	Length
1.	"The Soul of Patrick Lee"	2:49
2.	"Ides of March"	11:03
3.	"The Protégé"	2:52

== Personnel ==
- John Cale – bass guitar, harpsichord, piano, guitar, viola, organ
- Terry Riley – piano, organ, soprano saxophone

Additional personnel

- Adam Miller – vocals on "The Soul of Patrick Lee"
- Bobby Colomby – drums
- Bobby Gregg – second drums

Technical personnel

- Don Meehan – engineering
- John Berg, Richard Mantel – cover design
- Kim Whitesides – cover art
- Don Huntstein – cover photography
