= Words for the Dying =

Studio album by John Cale
- Released: 1989
- Genre: Classical Music; art rock
- Length: 38:38
- Label: All Saints Records; Opal; Warner Bros.; Land (UK)
- Producer: Brian Eno

John Cale chronology
Even Cowgirls Get the Blues (1987)	Words for the Dying (1989)	Songs for Drella (1990)

Words for the Dying is the twelfth solo studio album by the Welsh musician John Cale, released in 1989 by record labels Opal and Warner Bros.

== Content ==
The album consists mainly of oral work, read or sung by Cale. It was written in 1982 as a response to the Anglo-Argentinian Falklands War, using poems written by fellow Welshman Dylan Thomas. There are also two orchestral interludes, two other solo piano pieces "Songs Without Words 1 and 2", and finally a song by Cale, "The Soul of Carmen Miranda".

== Recording and production ==
The album was recorded in Moscow, New York, London and Suffolk, England and was produced by Brian Eno.

"The Falklands Suite" was recorded at Gostelradio Studios, Moscow, engineered by Sasha Karasiov. "The Falklands Suite" was first performed live on 14 November 1987 at the Paradiso in Amsterdam, The Netherlands. John Cale was recorded at The Strongroom, London, and Wilderness Studios, Woodbridge, Suffolk, England, engineered by Stephen Taylor and Brian Eno. "Songs Without Words I & II" were recorded at the Living Room, New York City, US, engineered by Paul Rice and Blaise Dupuy. "The Soul of Carmen Miranda" was recorded at Wilderness Studios, Woodbridge, England.

== Release ==
Words for the Dying was released in 1989 by record labels Opal and Warner Bros. in the US and Europe and Land in the UK.

It was reissued in 1992, and in 2005 with a different cover.

== Critical reception ==
Professional ratings
Review scores
Source	Rating
AllMusic	2.5/5 stars
PopMatters	6/10 stars
Trouser Press	(favourable)

Lou Reed selected the album as one of his 'picks of 1989'.

In its retrospective review, Fact described it as "arguably the last great album John Cale recorded".

== Documentary ==
In 1993 an 80-minute documentary film Words for the Dying, directed by Rob Nilsson, was released on DVD. It follows Cale and Eno to Moscow, London, and Wales during the creation of the album.

== Track listing ==
All tracks composed by John Cale, except as indicated.

Side A

The Falklands Suite

1. "Introduction"
2. "There Was a Saviour" (words: Dylan Thomas)
3. "Interlude I"
4. "On a Wedding Anniversary" (words: Dylan Thomas)

Side B

5. "Interlude II"
6. "Lie Still, Sleep Becalmed" (words: Dylan Thomas)
7. "Do Not Go Gentle into That Good Night" (words: Dylan Thomas)

Songs Without Words

8. "Songs Without Words I"
9. "Songs Without Words II"
10. The Soul of Carmen Miranda

Note: Some CD pressings combine tracks "There Was a Saviour" and "Interlude I" as one track (9:36).

== Personnel ==
Credits are adapted from the Words for the Dying liner notes.

- John Cale – vocals, piano, guitar, bass, organ, viola
- The Orchestra of Symphonic and Popular Music of Gostelradio, Russia
  - Conductor – Alexander G. Mikhailov
- The Choristers of Llandaff Cathedral Choir, Llandaff, Cardiff, South Wales
- James Elias (Dean's Scholar – Head Chorister), David Butler (Dean's Scholar – Head Chorister), Christopher Parsons, Andrew Richley, Darren Roberts, Richard Jeremy, Edward Jones, Edward Adams, Stephen Moss, Gareth Campbell, Benjamin Halsey, Benedict Davies-Jenkins, Charles Jeremy, Jonathan Robson.
  - Choirmaster – Dr. Michael John Smith
- Brian Eno – keyboards on "The Soul of Carmen Miranda"
- Nell Catchpole – violin, viola on "The Soul of Carmen Miranda"
