= Vintage Violence =

Studio album by John Cale
- Released: 25 March 1970
- Recorded: 1969
- Genre: Rock; baroque pop
- Length: 34:25
- Label: Columbia
- Producer: John Cale; Lewis Merenstein

John Cale chronology
Vintage Violence (1970)	Church of Anthrax (1971)

Singles from Vintage Violence
- 1. "Cleo"/"Fairweather Friend"" Released: May 1970; 2. "Big White Cloud"/"Gideon's Bible" Released: November 1970

Vintage Violence is the debut solo studio album by the Welsh rock musician John Cale, released on 25 March 1970 by Columbia Records. Cale and Lewis Merenstein produced the album.

== Recording ==
Produced for $15,000, Cale stated in his autobiography What's Welsh for Zen? that there wasn't "much originality on that album, it's just someone teaching himself to do something". He also "thought the songs were simplistic". He pieced together a band to play on the album, and they named themselves Penguin. However, the band did not last beyond the recording sessions.

== Content ==
The cover of the album features Cale with his face obscured by a glass mask over a nylon stocking, which he would later cite in his autobiography as symbolic of the content of the record: "You're not really seeing the personality".

== Release ==
Vintage Violence was released on 25 March 1970 by record label Columbia.

The album was re-released in remastered form in 2001.

== Critical reception ==
Professional ratings
Review scores
Source	Rating
AllMusic	4.5/5 stars
Christgau's Record Guide	C+
Entertainment Weekly	A−
The Rolling Stone Album Guide	3.5/5 stars
Spin Alternative Record Guide	7/10

Vintage Violence received mostly positive reviews. Rolling Stone magazine's Ed Ward said that the album sounds "like a Byrds album produced by Phil Spector who has marinated for six years in burgundy, anise and chili peppers". Ward was also quoted in Billboard magazine as saying, "I believe that this is destined to become one of the most important albums of the past few years."

Greil Marcus described it as "an exquisite, unheard solo album that was in some ways comparable to Van Morrison's Astral Weeks: the personal vision was that intense, the execution almost as graceful."

In his retrospective review, Mark Deming of AllMusic wrote: "John Cale had the strongest avant-garde credentials of anyone in The Velvet Underground, but he was also the Velvet whose solo career was the least strongly defined by his work with the band, and [...] Vintage Violence certainly bears this out."

== Track listing ==
All tracks are written by John Cale, except where noted.

Side A
No.	Title	Length
1.	"Hello, There"	2:48
2.	"Gideon's Bible"	3:22
3.	"Adelaide"	2:18
4.	"Big White Cloud"	3:31
5.	"Cleo"	2:35
6.	"Please"	4:19

Side B
No.	Title	Writer(s)	Length
7.	"Charlemagne"		5:03
8.	"Bring It on Up"		2:24
9.	"Amsterdam"		3:14
10.	"Ghost Story"		3:48
11.	"Fairweather Friend"	Garland Jeffreys	2:32
Total length:			34:25

Bonus tracks on 2001 remastered CD
No.	Title	Writer(s)	Length
12.	"Fairweather Friend" (alternate version)	Jeffreys	2:29
13.	"Wall"		6:06

== Personnel ==
Credits are adapted from the Vintage Violence liner notes.

- John Cale – vocals, bass guitar, guitar, keyboards; arrangements, conductor
- Garland Jeffreys – guitar, backing vocals
- Ernie Corallo – guitar
- Sanford Konikoff – drums
- Harvey Brooks – bass guitar
- Stan Szelest – piano

Production

- John Cale – producer
- Lewis Merenstein – producer
- John McClure – executive production
- Don Meehan – engineer
- Jim Reeves – engineer
- Israel "Isi" Véléris – photography
