= Paris 1919 (album) =

Studio album by John Cale
- Released: 25 February 1973
- Recorded: 1972–1973
- Studio: Sunwest (Los Angeles)
- Genre: Art pop; baroque pop
- Length: 31:30
- Label: Reprise
- Producer: Chris Thomas

John Cale chronology
The Academy in Peril (1972)	Paris 1919 (1973)	June 1, 1974 (1974)

John Cale studio album chronology
The Academy in Peril (1972)	Paris 1919 (1973)	Fear (1974)

Paris 1919 is the third solo studio album by the Welsh musician John Cale, released on 25 February 1973 by Reprise Records. Musicians including Lowell George of Little Feat and Wilton Felder performed on the album, which was produced by Chris Thomas.

In contrast to the experimental nature of much of Cale's work, the album is noted for its orchestral singer-songwriter style, reminiscent of contemporary pop rock music. Its title is a reference to the 1919 Paris Peace Conference following World War I, and its lyrics explore various aspects of early 20th-century European culture and history.

The album has received critical praise from several publications, including AllMusic and Rolling Stone.

== Recording ==
Paris 1919 was recorded in 1972 and 1973 at Sunwest in Los Angeles. It was produced by Chris Thomas, who had previously worked with Procol Harum. Cale explained in a 1973 interview that he had employed Thomas to help add objectivity to the recording process. In the same interview he also mentioned that the album featured members of Little Feat; although musician credits were never included on the album's original packaging, the 2006 Rhino expanded CD edition credited Little Feat members Lowell George on guitar and Richie Hayward on drums, along with bassist and saxophonist Wilton Felder of the Crusaders and the University of California, Los Angeles Symphony Orchestra.

== Music and lyrics ==
AllMusic considers Paris 1919 the most accessible and traditional of Cale's albums, and the best-known of his work as a solo artist. Paris 1919 takes its influences from pop and rock artists such as Brian Wilson, the Bee Gees, and Procol Harum, particularly the latter band's popular 1972 live album Live in Concert with the Edmonton Symphony Orchestra. Cale stated that some of the songs on the album dated back to before the release of his solo debut Vintage Violence (1970).

Lyrically, Cale recalls possible childhood memories in "Child's Christmas in Wales", whose title references Dylan Thomas' prose poem "A Child's Christmas in Wales"; the song also references Thomas' poem "The Ballad of the Long-Legged Bait" in its second verse. According to Cale, "Half Past France" concerns "soldiers already dead talking about what's happened" at the end of World War I, while "Graham Greene" is about "the end of civilization, I guess". As well as Graham Greene, Cale makes cultural, literary, and geographical references to Macbeth, Enoch Powell, Chipping Sodbury, Andalusia, Dunkirk, and Segovia. "Antarctica Starts Here" was inspired by Cale's cocaine use and Gloria Swanson's role in the film Sunset Boulevard.

The album's title makes reference to the 1919 Paris Peace Conference, an event that established a new partitioning of Europe as well as the assignment of war reparations. With the event having arguably contributed to the rise of Nazi Germany and subsequently the outbreak of World War II, Cale described the record as "an example of the nicest ways of saying something ugly."

== Release and critical reception ==
Professional ratings
Review scores
Source	Rating
AllMusic	4.5/5 stars
Christgau's Record Guide	B+
The Guardian	4/5 stars
Mojo	4/5 stars
Pitchfork	9.5/10
Q	4/5 stars
The Rolling Stone Album Guide	4.5/5 stars
Spin Alternative Record Guide	10/10
Tiny Mix Tapes	4.5/5 stars

Paris 1919 was released to warm critical reception. Rolling Stone writer Stephen Holden deemed it a "masterpiece" and "one of the most ambitious albums ever released under the name of 'pop'". He found that the songwriting "requires a great deal of listening in order for its full implications to be perceived". In Let It Rock, Mick Gold said that "Paris 1919 has more humanity and humour than anything I've previously associated with Cale". Gold wrote that Cale "loves style and chaos in equal quantities and he's never married them better than on this album", and concluded that "John Cale has succeeded in producing an album that is more accessible than his previous work without sacrificing his ability to evoke unvisited planets, and ... he has set his images in music that combines simplicity with subtle detail". Reviewing an import copy of Paris 1919 in Sounds, Martin Hayman noted that the songs were closer to rock music than classical music, and described the record as "a more satisfying collection than [The Academy in Peril]", calling it "a brilliant and indispensable album".

Subsequent positive reviews continued to be published many years later. AllMusic critic Jason Ankeny praised its "richly poetic" songs for functioning as "enigmatic period pieces strongly evocative of their time and place". He also wrote that "there's little here to suggest either Cale's noisy, abrasive past or the chaos about to resurface in his subsequent work", since Cale, according to Ankeny, "for better or worse... never achieved a similar beauty again." Tiny Mix Tapes remarked that "Cale slyly crafted a brilliant achievement in Paris 1919 by utilizing a mournful gentility to catch his original target audience unaware and hiding in plain sight." In 2010, Los Angeles Times critic Matt Diehl called Paris 1919 "the idiosyncratic pinnacle to Cale's thrilling yet perverse career, despite the fact it never topped the charts".

Paris 1919 received a full reissue on 19 June 2006 by Rhino Records UK. The revamped version features the original album remastered, in addition to the outtake "Burned Out Affair", alternate and rehearsal versions of every song on the album, a hidden, unlisted instrumental version of "Macbeth", and the sound effects of the chirping birds found in the title track. Pitchfork gave the reissue a 9.5 out of 10 rating.

On 15 November 2024, Domino Recording Company released deluxe reissues of both Paris 1919 and The Academy in Peril. The remastered reissue of Paris 1919 was released on expanded CD and 2LP vinyl formats; both include bonus tracks, including previously unreleased outtakes as well as previously unheard songs "I Must Not Sniff Cocaine" and Cale's newly-created mix "Fever Dream 2024: You're a Ghost", but excluding "Burned Out Affair".

== Live performances ==
Cale has performed Paris 1919 live in its entirety throughout the world, beginning in Cardiff on 21 November 2009, with his regular band and a 19-piece orchestra, with new orchestral arrangements by Cale and composer Randall Woolf. The show was staged again in 2010 in London, Norwich, Paris, Brescia, Los Angeles, and Melbourne, then in 2011 in Barcelona, Essen, and Malmö, as well as two shows in New York City in January 2013.

== Legacy ==
The Wire included Paris 1919 in its list of "100 Records That Set the World on Fire (While No One Was Listening)". In 2016, Uncut ranked Paris 1919 at number 99 in its list of the 200 greatest albums of all time. The album was also featured in the 2005 book 1001 Albums You Must Hear Before You Die.

Songs from Paris 1919 have been covered by artists including Andrew Bird, Yo La Tengo, Manic Street Preachers, Owen Pallett, David Soldier and the Soldier String Quartet, David J, Okkervil River, Jay Bennett and Edward Burch, and Sally Timms.

== Track listing ==
All tracks are written by John Cale.

Side A
No.	Title	Length
1.	"Child's Christmas in Wales"	3:21
2.	"Hanky Panky Nohow"	2:46
3.	"The Endless Plain of Fortune"	4:13
4.	"Andalucia"	3:54
5.	"Macbeth"	3:08

Side B
No.	Title	Length
6.	"Paris 1919"	4:07
7.	"Graham Greene"	3:00
8.	"Half Past France"	4:20
9.	"Antarctica Starts Here"	2:47
Total length:		31:30

2006 reissue bonus tracks: Sketches & Roughs for Paris 1919
No.	Title	Length
10.	"Burned Out Affair" (Outtake)	3:24
11.	"Child's Christmas in Wales" (Alternate Version)	3:30
12.	"Hanky Panky Nohow" (Drone Mix)	2:51
13.	"The Endless Plain of Fortune" (Alternate Version)	4:08
14.	"Andalucia" (Rehearsal)	4:34
15.	"Macbeth" (Alternate Version)	3:34
16.	"Paris 1919" (String Mix)	4:29
17.	"Graham Greene" (Rehearsal)	1:40
18.	"Half Past France" (Alternate Version)	4:50
19.	"Antarctica Starts Here" (Rehearsal)	2:52
20.	"Paris 1919" (Piano Mix)	6:09
21.	"Macbeth" (unlisted instrumental)	5:17

2024 reissue bonus tracks
No.	Title	Length
10.	"I Must Not Sniff Cocaine"	0:39
11.	"Hanky Panky Nowhow" (Drone Mix)	3:01
12.	"Child's Christmas in Wales" (Rehearsal 1)	3:31
13.	"Half Past France" (Intro Chat)	4:27
14.	"Macbeth" (Take 11)	3:37
15.	"Hanky Panky Nowhow" (Guitar Mix)	3:40
16.	"Fever Dream 2024: You're a Ghost"	9:11

== Personnel ==
Musicians

- John Cale – vocals, piano, keyboards, viola, acoustic guitar
- Lowell George – electric guitar, acoustic guitar
- Wilton Felder – bass guitar, saxophone
- Richie Hayward – drums
- Chris Thomas – tambourine
- The UCLA Symphony Orchestra – strings
- Joel Druckman, Esq. – orchestra manager

Technical

- Chris Thomas – original album production
- Mike Salisbury – original album design and photography
- Andy Zax – reissue production
- Dave Schultz – remastering (at DigiPrep, Los Angeles)
- Matthew Specktor – liner notes
- Greg Allen – reissue art direction and design
- Bob Rush – additional booklet photography
- Project supervision for Rhino UK: Stuart Batsford and Mick Houghton
- Project assistance: Brian Kehew, Bill Inglot, Rick Conrad, Patrick Milligan, Cheryl Pawelski, Mason Williams, and Robin Hurley

2024 reissue

- "Fever Dream 2024: You're a Ghost" produced by John Cale; engineered by Dustin Boyer
- Grayson Haver Currin – liner notes
