= John Cale =

Welsh musician (born 1942)

John Cale OBE
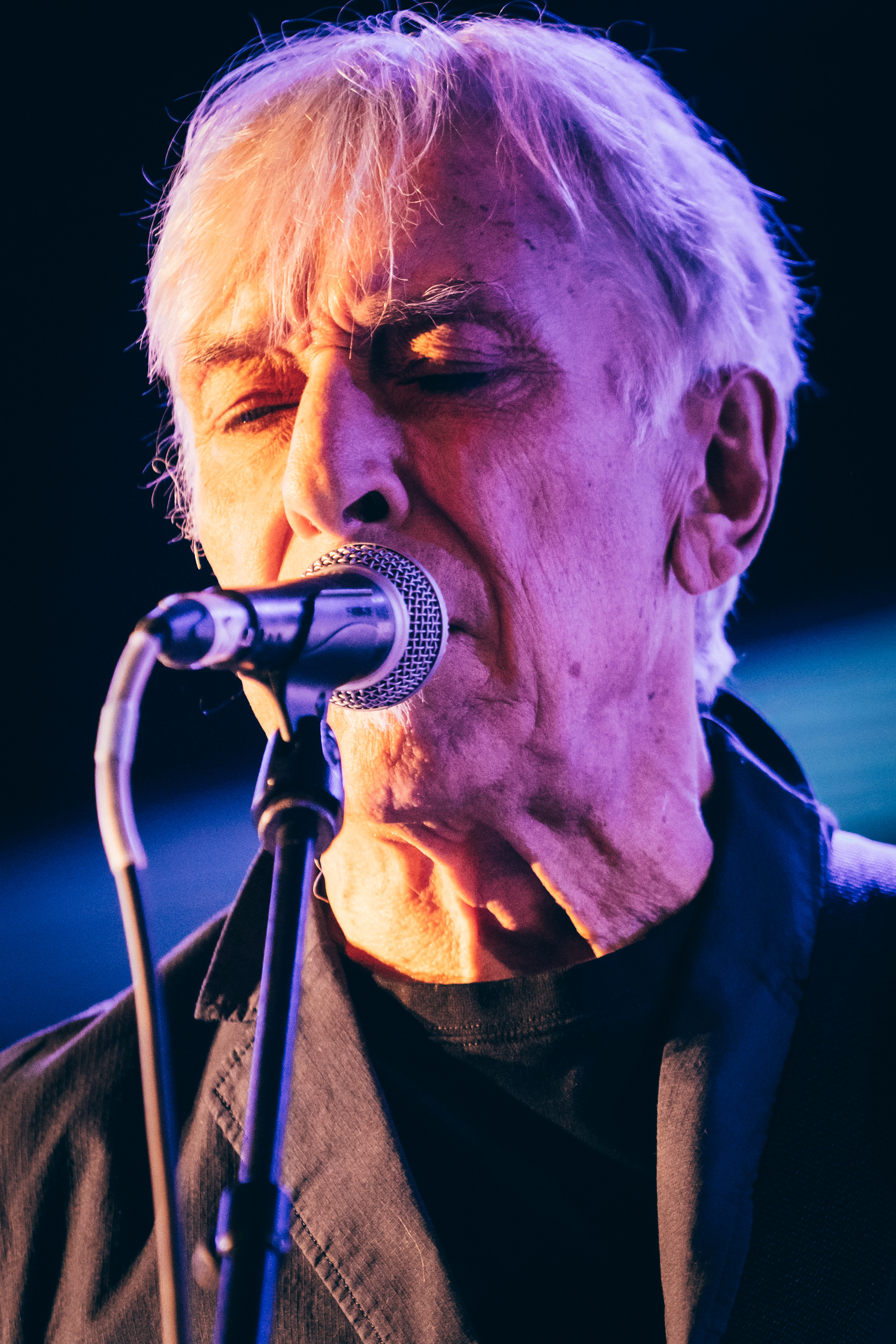
- Cale in 2020
- Born: John Davies Cale; 9 March 1942 (age 84); Garnant, Carmarthenshire, Wales
- Occupations: Singer; musician; composer; record producer; arranger
- Years active: 1957–present
- Spouse: Betsey Johnson (m. 1968; div. 1971) Cynthia Wells (m. 1971; div. 1975) Risé Irushalmi (m. 1981; div. 1997)
- Children: 1
- Musical career
- Education: Goldsmiths College, University of London
- Genres: Art rock; avant-garde; experimental rock; pop
- Instruments: Vocals; viola; keyboards; bass; guitar
- Works: Discography; filmography
- Labels: Columbia; Reprise; Island; A&M; ZE; Beggars Banquet; Warner Bros.; Hannibal; EMI; Table of the Elements; Double Six; Domino
- Formerly of: The Velvet Underground; Theatre of Eternal Music
- Website: john-cale.com

Signature
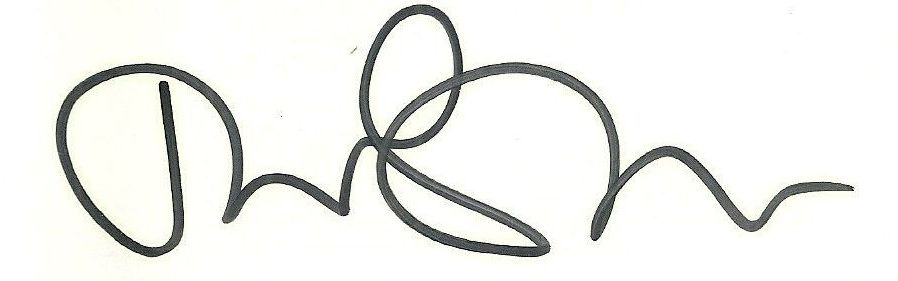

John Davies Cale (born 9 March 1942) is a Welsh singer, musician, composer, record producer and arranger. He was a founding member of the influential American rock band the Velvet Underground, with whom he recorded two studio albums. Over his six-decade career, Cale has worked in various styles of rock and avant-garde music.

John Cale studied music at Goldsmiths, University of London, before moving to New York City in 1963, where he performed as part of the drone collective the Theatre of Eternal Music and formed the Velvet Underground with Lou Reed. Since leaving the band in 1968, Cale has released seventeen solo studio albums, including Paris 1919 (1973), which is retrospectively considered to be his masterpiece; Fear (1974); Slow Dazzle (1975); and Music for a New Society (1982). In 1990, he collaborated with Reed on Songs for Drella, a tribute to the Velvet Underground's mentor and one-time manager Andy Warhol.

Cale has worked as a record producer with artists including Nico, the Stooges, the Modern Lovers, Patti Smith, Squeeze, Happy Mondays and Siouxsie and the Banshees. Cale was inducted into the Rock and Roll Hall of Fame as a member of the Velvet Underground in 1996.

== Early life and career ==
John Davies Cale was born on 9 March 1942 in the coal mining village of Garnant, Carmarthenshire, Wales, to William Arthur George Cale, a miner, and Margaret Davies, a primary school teacher. His father spoke only English, while his mother also spoke and taught Welsh to Cale. He began learning English at primary school, at around the age of seven. Cale was molested by two different men during his youth: an Anglican priest who molested him in a church and a music teacher. He played organ at Ammanford church. The BBC recorded Cale playing a toccata he composed, which some commentators compared to the work of Aram Khachaturian.

Having discovered a talent for viola, Cale joined the National Youth Orchestra of Wales (NYOW) at age 13. Receiving a scholarship, he then studied music at Goldsmiths College, University of London. While he was there he organised an early Fluxus concert, A Little Festival of New Music, on 6 July 1963. He also contributed to the short film Police Car and had two scores published in Fluxus Preview Review (July 1963) for the nascent avant-garde collective. He conducted the first performance in the UK of Cage's Concert for Piano and Orchestra, with the English composer and pianist Michael Garrett as soloist. In 1963, he travelled to the United States to continue his musical training with the assistance and influence of American composer Aaron Copland, who recommended him for Tanglewood.

Upon arriving in New York City, Cale met a number of influential composers. On 9 September 1963, he participated, along with John Cage and several others, in an 18-hour-and-40-minute marathon piano concert that was the first full-length performance of Erik Satie's Vexations. After the performance, Cale appeared on the television panel show I've Got a Secret. Cale's secret was that he had performed in an 18-hour concert, and he was accompanied by Karl Schenzer, whose secret was that he was the only member of the audience who had stayed for the duration. Cale would later attribute his own "relaxed" artistic outlook to Cage, having hitherto been raised to believe that European composers were obliged to justify their work.

During this period, Cale also played in composer La Monte Young's Theatre of Eternal Music. The drone-based music he played there influenced aspects of his later work with the Velvet Underground. One of his collaborators on these recordings was the future Velvet Underground guitarist Sterling Morrison. Three albums of Cale's early experimental work from this period were released in 2001.

== The Velvet Underground (1964–1968) ==
Cale had enjoyed and followed rock music as well as avant-garde and European art music from a young age.

Earlier that year, he co-founded the Velvet Underground with Lou Reed, recruiting his flatmate Angus MacLise and Reed's college friend Sterling Morrison to complete the initial line-up. Just before the band's first paying gig for $75 at Summit High School in Summit, New Jersey, MacLise abruptly quit the band because he viewed accepting money for art as selling out; he was replaced by Moe Tucker as the band's drummer. Initially hired to play that one show, she soon became a permanent member; her style became an integral part of the band's music, despite the initial objections of Cale to the band having a female drummer.

On a visit to Britain in 1965, Cale procured records by the Kinks, the Who and the Small Faces that had remained unavailable in the United States and shopped a crudely recorded acoustic Velvet Underground demo tape to several luminaries in the British rock scene (including Marianne Faithfull) with the intention of securing a recording contract. Although this failed to manifest, the tape was disseminated throughout the UK underground over the following eighteen months by such figures as record producer Joe Boyd and Mick Farren of the Deviants. As a result, the Deviants, the Yardbirds and David Bowie had all covered Velvet Underground songs prior to the release of their debut studio album in 1967.

The very first commercially available recording of the Velvet Underground, an instrumental track called "Loop" given away with the Pop Art issue of Aspen magazine, was a feedback experiment written and conducted by Cale. His creative relationship with Reed was integral to the sound of the Velvet Underground's first two studio albums, The Velvet Underground & Nico (1967) and White Light/White Heat (1968). On these albums he plays viola, bass guitar and keyboards, and sings occasional backing vocals. White Light/White Heat also features two lead vocal performances from Cale: "Lady Godiva's Operation", where he shares lead vocal duties with Reed, and "The Gift", a long spoken-word piece based on a short story written by Reed during his time at Syracuse University. Cale co-wrote the music to several of the band's songs and played an electrically amplified viola on early recordings. Cale also played on Nico's debut studio album, Chelsea Girl (1967), which includes songs co-written by Velvet Underground members Cale, Reed and Morrison, who also appear as musicians. Cale makes his debut as lyricist on "Winter Song" and "Little Sister".

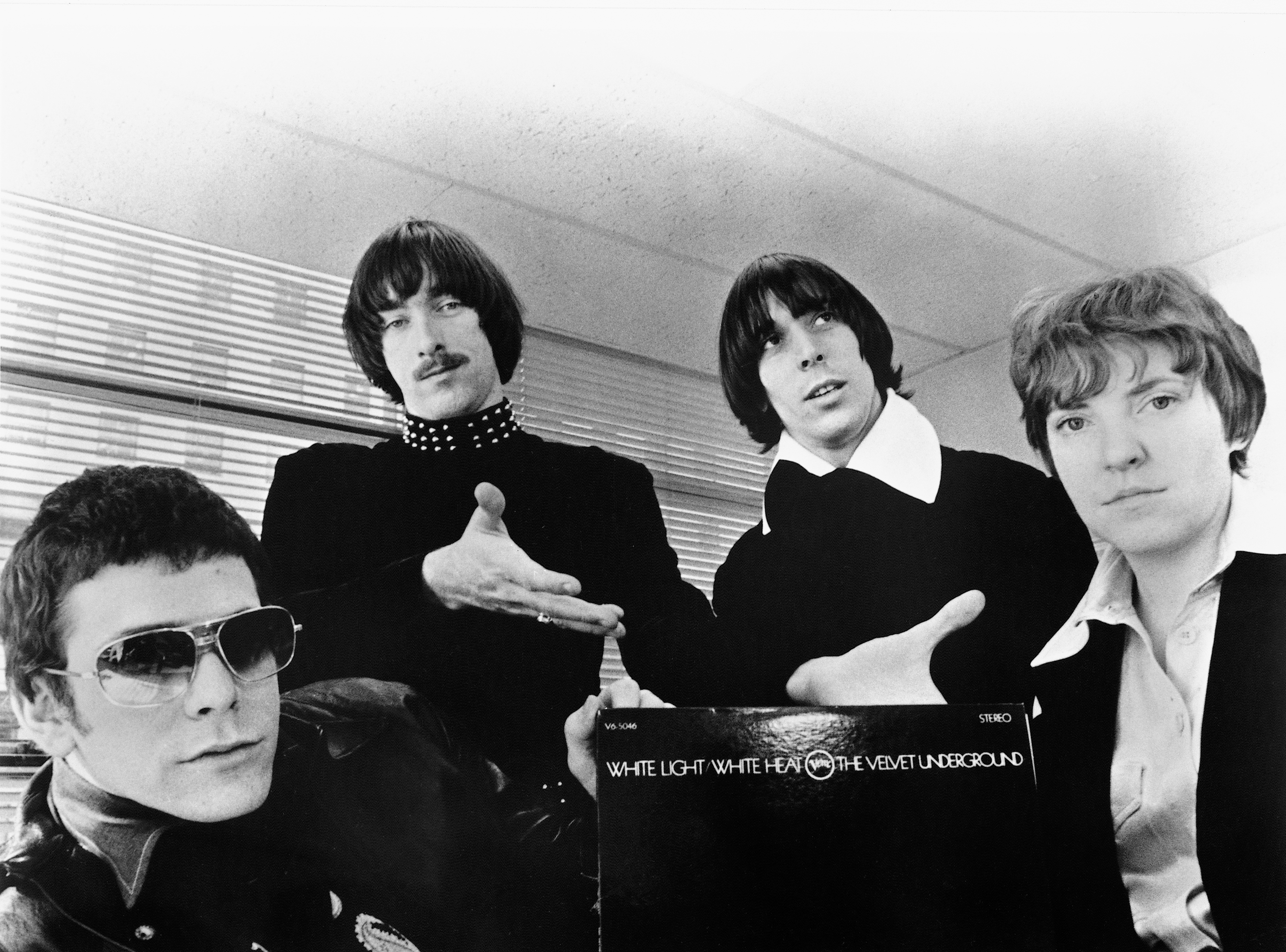
Cale (middle right) in a promotional photo for White Light/White Heat in 1968

With tensions between Reed and Cale growing, Reed gave an ultimatum to Morrison and Tucker, declaring that unless Cale was fired, he would quit the band. Morrison and Tucker reluctantly went along with the scheme.

In September 1968, Cale played his final gig with the Velvet Underground at the Boston Tea Party. According to Tucker, "When John left, it was really sad. I felt really bad. And of course, this was gonna really influence the music, 'cause, John's a lunatic (laughs). I think we became a little more normal, which was fine, it was good music, good songs, it was never the same though. It was good stuff, a lot of good songs, but, just, the lunacy factor was... gone." After his dismissal from the band, Cale was replaced by Boston-based musician Doug Yule, who played bass guitar and keyboards and would soon share lead vocal duties in the band with Reed.

Michael Carlucci, who was friends with Robert Quine, has stated: "Lou told Quine that the reason why he had to get rid of Cale in the band was Cale's ideas were just too out there. Cale had some wacky ideas. He wanted to record the next album with the amplifiers underwater, and [Lou] just couldn't have it. He was trying to make the band more accessible."

Some commentators argue that frictions between Cale and Reed influenced the band's early sound. The pair often had heated disagreements about the direction of the band, and this tension was central to their later collaborations. When Cale left, he seemed to take the more experimental tendencies with him, as is noticeable in comparing the proto-noise rock of White Light/White Heat to the comparatively soft, folk rock–influenced The Velvet Underground (1969), recorded after his departure.

Cale has favorably compared the dissonance of his Velvet Underground compositions to the indecipherable lyricism of certain strains of Southern hip-hop: "If I can use out-of-tune stuff, [rappers] don't need words to make sense. There's definitely a lineage".

Cale briefly returned to the Velvet Underground in 1970, albeit in the studio only: he played organ on the track "Ocean" during the practice sessions to produce demos for the band's fourth studio album Loaded, nearly two years after he left the band. He was enticed back into the studio by the band's manager, Steve Sesnick, "in a half-hearted attempt to reunite old comrades". Although he does not appear on the finished album, the demo recording of "Ocean" was included in the 1997 Loaded: Fully Loaded Edition CD re-issue. Finally, five previously unreleased tracks recorded in late 1967 and early 1968 were included on the compilation albums VU (1985) and Another View (1986).

== Solo career ==
=== 1970s ===
After leaving the Velvet Underground, Cale worked as a record producer and arranger on a number of studio albums, most notably the Stooges' highly influential 1969 self-titled debut and Nico's The Marble Index (1968), Desertshore (1970) and The End... (1974). On these he accompanied Nico's voice and harmonium using a wide array of instruments to unusual effect. While meeting with Joe Boyd (who co-produced Desertshore), he came across Nick Drake's music and insisted on collaborating with the fledgling artist. He appeared on Drake's second studio album, Bryter Layter (1971), playing viola and harpsichord on "Fly" and piano, organ, and celesta on "Northern Sky".

In addition to working as a record producer, Cale initiated a solo recording career in early 1970. His debut studio album, Vintage Violence (1970), incorporated elements associated with roots rock and has been compared by critics to work by the Band, Leonard Cohen, the Byrds, Phil Spector and Brian Wilson. The more experimental Church of Anthrax (a collaboration with American minimalist composer Terry Riley) followed in February 1971. While his explorations in art music briefly continued with 1972's The Academy in Peril, he would not compose in the classical mode thereafter until he began working on film soundtracks in the 1980s.

In 1972, he signed with Reprise Records as a recording artist and staff producer. The subsequent Paris 1919 (1973) steered back towards the singer-songwriter mode of Vintage Violence with a backing band that included Lowell George of Little Feat and Wilton Felder of the Crusaders, as well as the University of California, Los Angeles Symphony Orchestra. Composed of highly melodic songs with arcane and complex lyrics, it has been cited by critics as one of his best.

While affiliated with Reprise, he produced studio albums by Jennifer Warnes (her third, Jennifer), Chunky, Novi & Ernie, and the self-titled debut of the Modern Lovers, which Reprise chose not to release; it subsequently appeared on Beserkley Records. In 1974, he signed a recording contract with Island Records as an artist, while continuing to produce a variety of artists (mostly for other labels), including Squeeze, Patti Smith and Sham 69. He also worked as a talent scout with Island's A&R department.

==== 1974–1979 ====
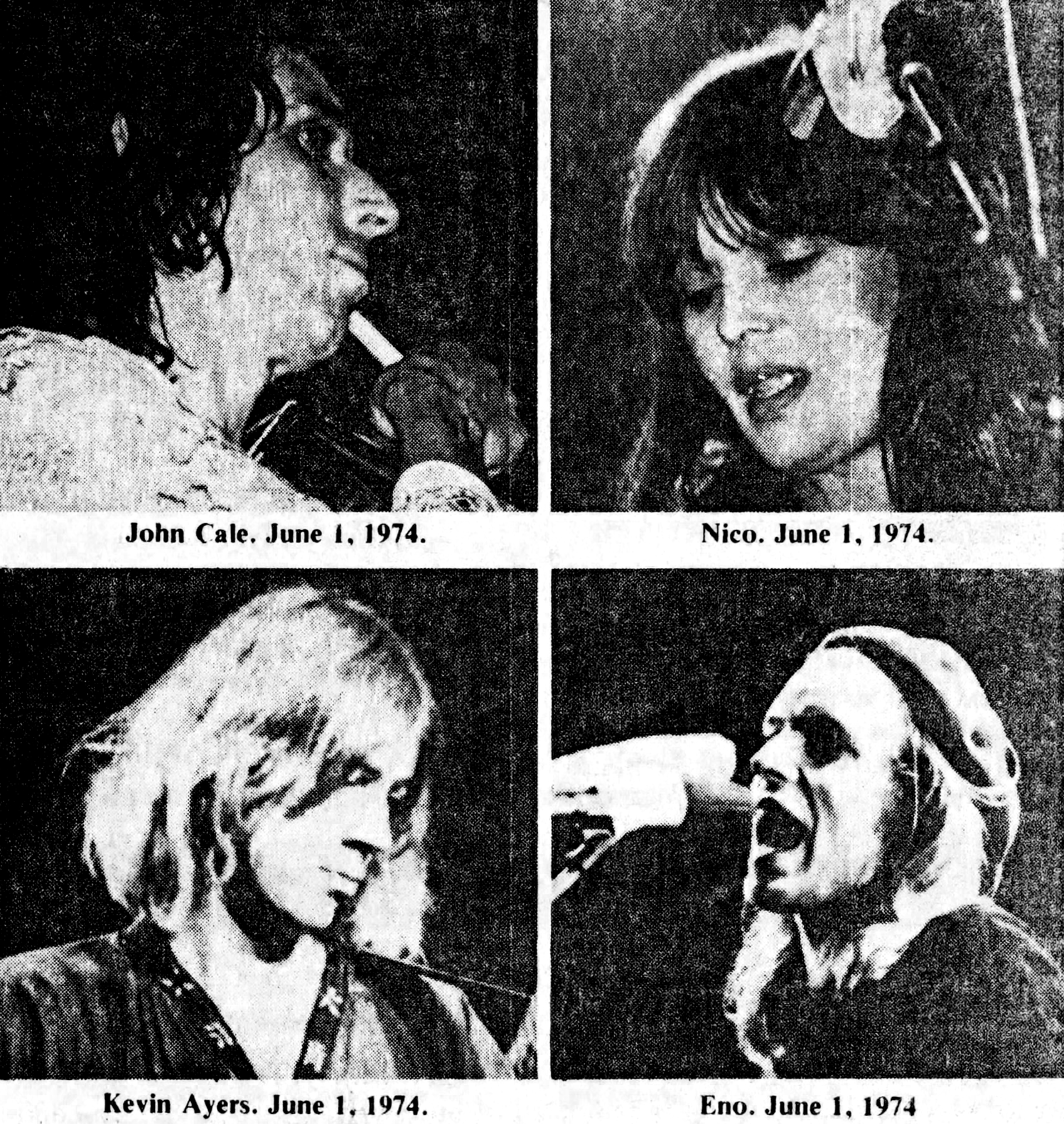
A collage of Cale, Nico, Kevin Ayers, and Brian Eno performing at London's Rainbow Theatre, 1 June 1974

In 1974, Cale moved back to London. As his second marriage had begun to dissolve, he made a series of solo studio albums which moved in a new direction. His records now featured a dark and threatening aura, often carrying a sense of barely suppressed aggression. A trilogy of studio albums – Fear (1974), Slow Dazzle (1975), and Helen of Troy (1975) – were rapidly recorded and released over the course of about a year with other Island artists, including Phil Manzanera and Brian Eno of Roxy Music and Chris Spedding, who played in his live band. One notable element of his concerts from the era was his cover version of Elvis Presley's 1956 song "Heartbreak Hotel", performed on Slow Dazzle (1975) and on the live album June 1, 1974, recorded with Kevin Ayers, Nico and Eno. Both "Leaving It Up to You" and "Fear Is a Man's Best Friend" (from Fear) begin as relatively conventional songs that gradually grow more paranoid in tone before breaking down into what critic Dave Thompson calls "a morass of discordance and screaming".

Cale released Animal Justice in 1977, an extended play (EP) notable particularly for the epic "Hedda Gabler" based very loosely on the 1891 play of the same name by Henrik Ibsen. His loud, abrasive and confrontational live performances of this period fit the punk rock scene developing in the UK and US. Cale took to wearing a hockey goaltender mask onstage (as evinced by the cover of his 1977 compilation album Guts, a compilation drawn from the Island trilogy after the label withheld Helen of Troy in the US). During one concert in Croydon, Cale chopped the head off a dead chicken with a meat cleaver, leading his band to walk offstage in protest. Cale's drummer, a vegetarian, was so bothered he quit the band; Cale mocks his decision on "Chicken Shit" from Animal Justice. Cale has admitted that some of his paranoia and erratic behaviour at this time came from heavy cocaine use.

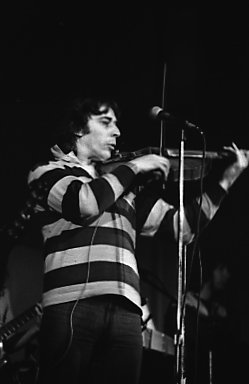
Cale performing live in Toronto, Ontario, Canada, 1977

In 1977, Cale produced "I Don't Wanna", the debut single by Sham 69.

In 1978, Cale produced the majority of Squeeze's debut studio album Squeeze, with Cale instructing the band to discard all of the songs that the band had written up until that point and write new songs instead. Band members Glenn Tilbrook and Chris Difford found the process of working with Cale both frustrating and challenging. He played keyboards on Julie Covington's 1978 cover version of Alice Cooper's 1975 song "Only Women Bleed", which peaked at No. 12 on the UK singles chart.

In 1979, he began a relationship with Austin, Texas-based groupie and journalist Margaret Moser. Cale named the group of women that Moser hung out with the Texas Blondes. His relationship with Moser lasted about five years, overlapping with the beginning of his third marriage.

In December 1979, Cale's embrace of the punk rock ethic that he helped to inspire culminated in the release of Sabotage/Live. This record, recorded live over three nights at CBGB in Manhattan that June, features aggressive vocal and instrumental performances. The album consists entirely of new songs, many of which grapple confrontationally with global politics, militarism and paranoia.

Also in 1979, Cale played piano and synthesizer on the track "Bastard" by Ian Hunter of Mott the Hoople, on his fourth solo studio album You're Never Alone with a Schizophrenic.

The band included Deerfrance on vocals and percussion. An earlier live set, consisting mostly of new material, was recorded at CBGB the previous year. It was released in 1987 as Even Cowgirls Get the Blues. The band on that recording includes Ivan Král (best known for his work with Patti Smith) on bass and longtime Brian Eno associate Judy Nylon providing vocals, and narrating.

=== 1980s ===
In 1980, Cale signed a recording contract with A&M Records and moved in a more commercial direction with his seventh solo studio album Honi Soit (1981). He worked with record producer Mike Thorne towards this end. Andy Warhol provided the cover art, in black and white, but against Warhol's wishes, Cale colourised it. The new direction did not succeed commercially, however, and his relationship with A&M ended. He signed with ZE Records, a company he had influenced the creation of and which had absorbed SPY Records, the label he had co-founded with Jane Friedman. In 1982, Cale released the sparse studio album Music for a New Society. Seeming to blend the refined music of his early solo work with the threatening music that came later, it is by any standard a bleak, harrowing record. It's been called "understated, and perhaps a masterpiece".

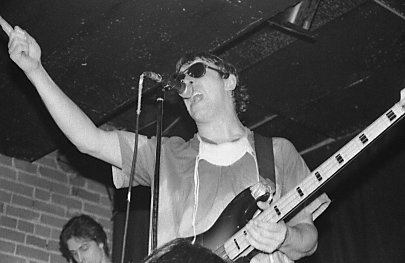
Cale performing in Toronto, 1980

He followed it up with his ninth solo studio album, Caribbean Sunset (1984), also on ZE Records. The album features contributions from Brian Eno and an otherwise "young unknown" band, that consisted of David Young on guitar, Andrew Heermans on bass guitar, and David Lichtenstein (son of artist Roy Lichtenstein) on drums. This work, with much more accessible production than on Music for a New Society (1982), was still extremely militant in some ways. Caribbean Sunset became Cale's only studio album to chart on the Dutch Album Top 100, peaking at No. 28. However, it received negative reviews from critics, and has never been released on CD.

A live album, John Cale Comes Alive (1984), followed Caribbean Sunset and included two new studio songs, "Ooh La La" and "Never Give Up on You". Different mixes of the two studio tracks appeared on both sides of the Atlantic. During this period, Eden Cale was born to Cale and his third wife Risé Irushalmi in July 1985.

In a last-ditch attempt at commercial success, Cale recorded Artificial Intelligence (1985), his only studio album for Beggars Banquet Records. With all of its tracks written in collaboration with High Times and National Lampoon editor Larry "Ratso" Sloman (who had previously co-written two tracks on Caribbean Sunset), the album was a pop effort characterised by prominent use of synthesizers and drum machines. Commercially, the album did not match the success of some earlier releases; the single 'Satellite Walk' was relatively successful. Some critics have singled out 'Dying on the Vine' as a notable track. That same year, he played a neo-Nazi organizer on an episode of the American action crime drama television series The Equalizer, and wrote the music for a dramatisation of the Kurt Vonnegut short story Who Am I This Time? (1982), which aired on PBS and starred Christopher Walken and Susan Sarandon.

Cale again returned to record producing, producing four tracks on Belgian pop singer Lio's third studio album Pop model (1986) and Happy Mondays's debut studio album, Squirrel and G-Man Twenty Four Hour Party People Plastic Face Carnt Smile (White Out) (1987). Other albums that he produced during this time were Element of Crime's second studio album Try to Be Mensch (1987), and Art Bergmann's debut solo studio album Crawl with Me (1988).

In part because of raising his young daughter, Cale took a long break from recording and performing. He made a comeback in 1989 with the Brian Eno-produced studio album Words for the Dying. The album consists mainly of oral work, read or sung by Cale. It was written in 1982 as a response to the Falklands War, using poems written by fellow Welshman Dylan Thomas. There are also two orchestral interludes, two other solo piano pieces "Songs Without Words", and finally a song by Cale, "The Soul of Carmen Miranda".

=== 1990s ===
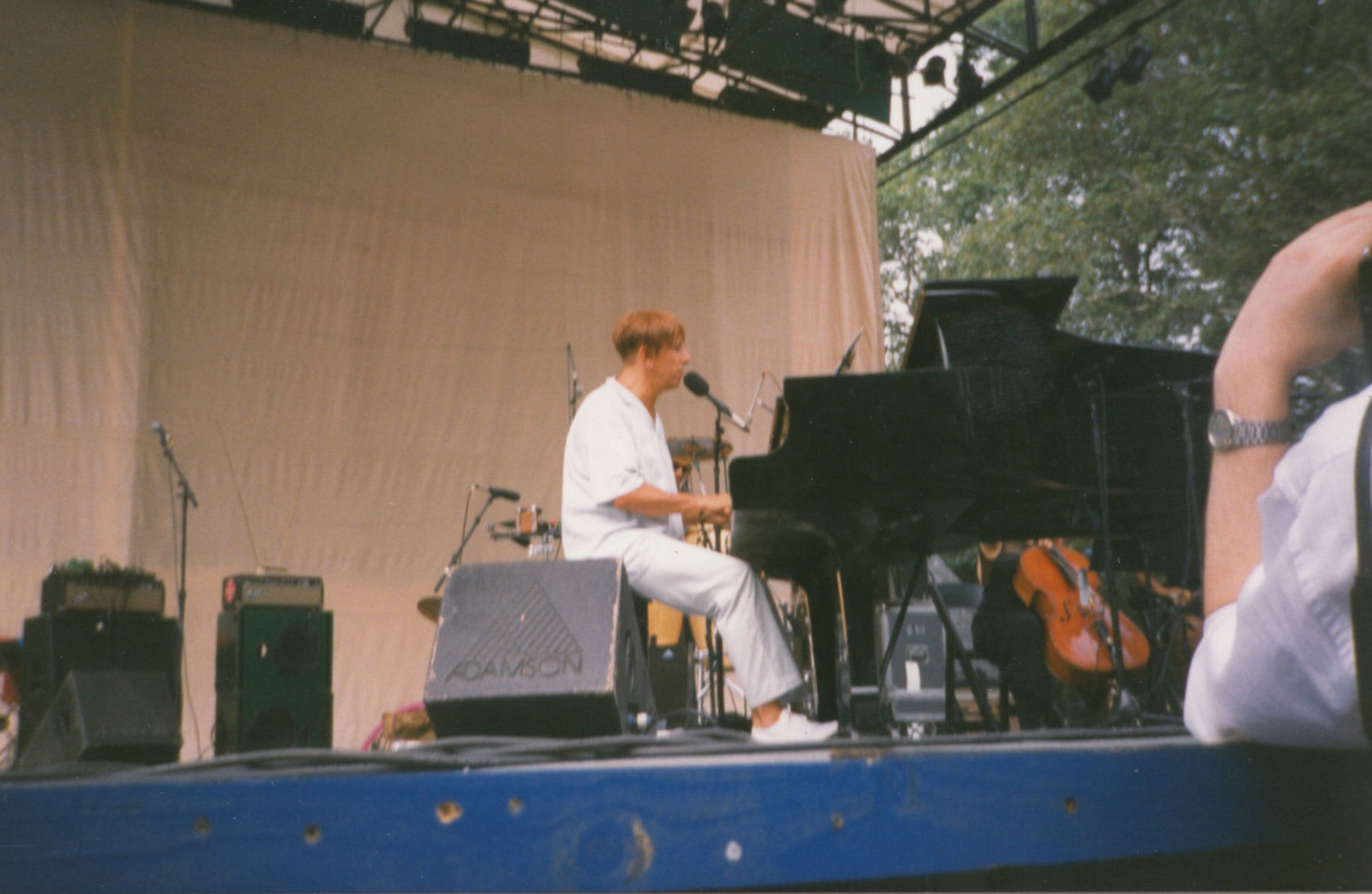
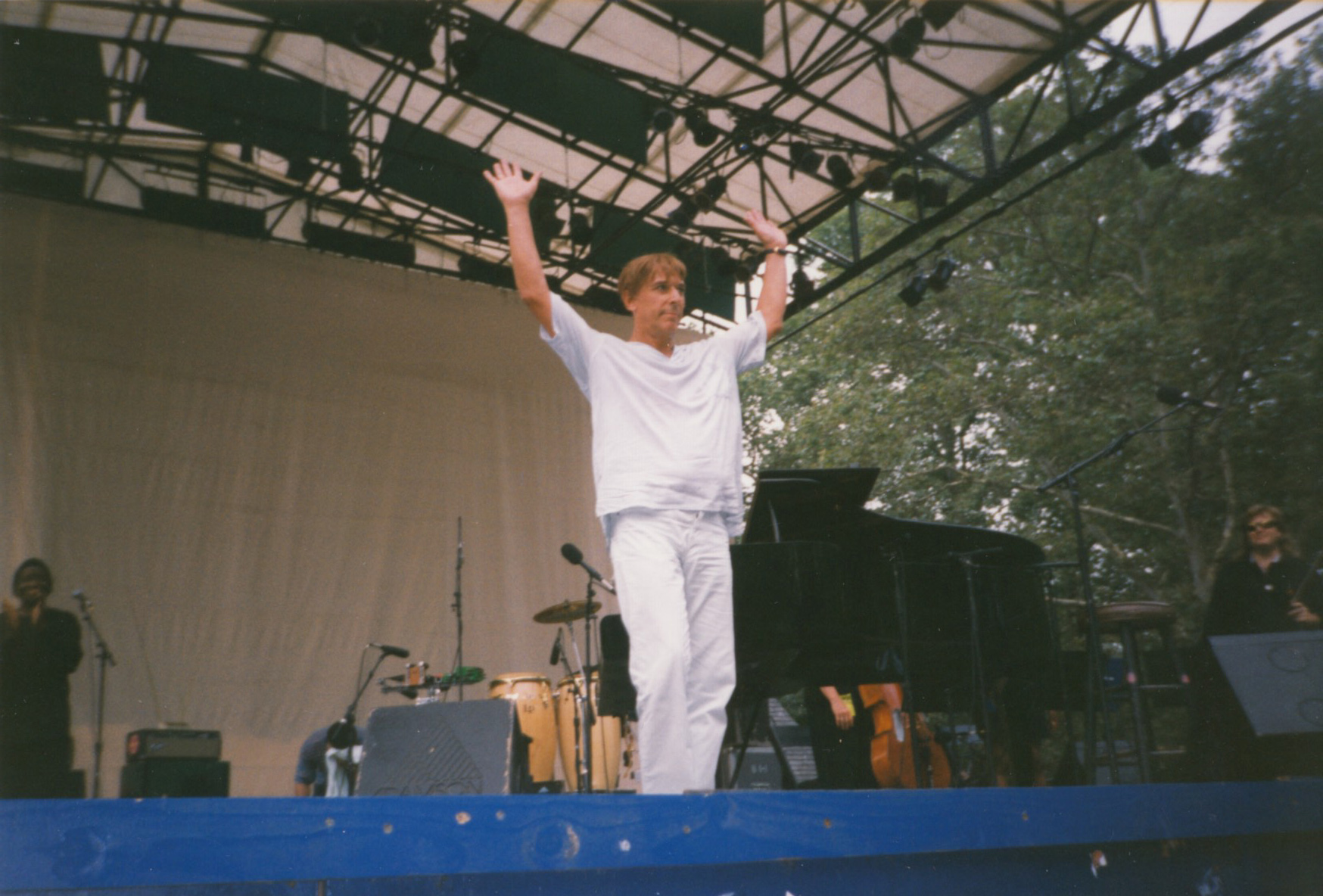

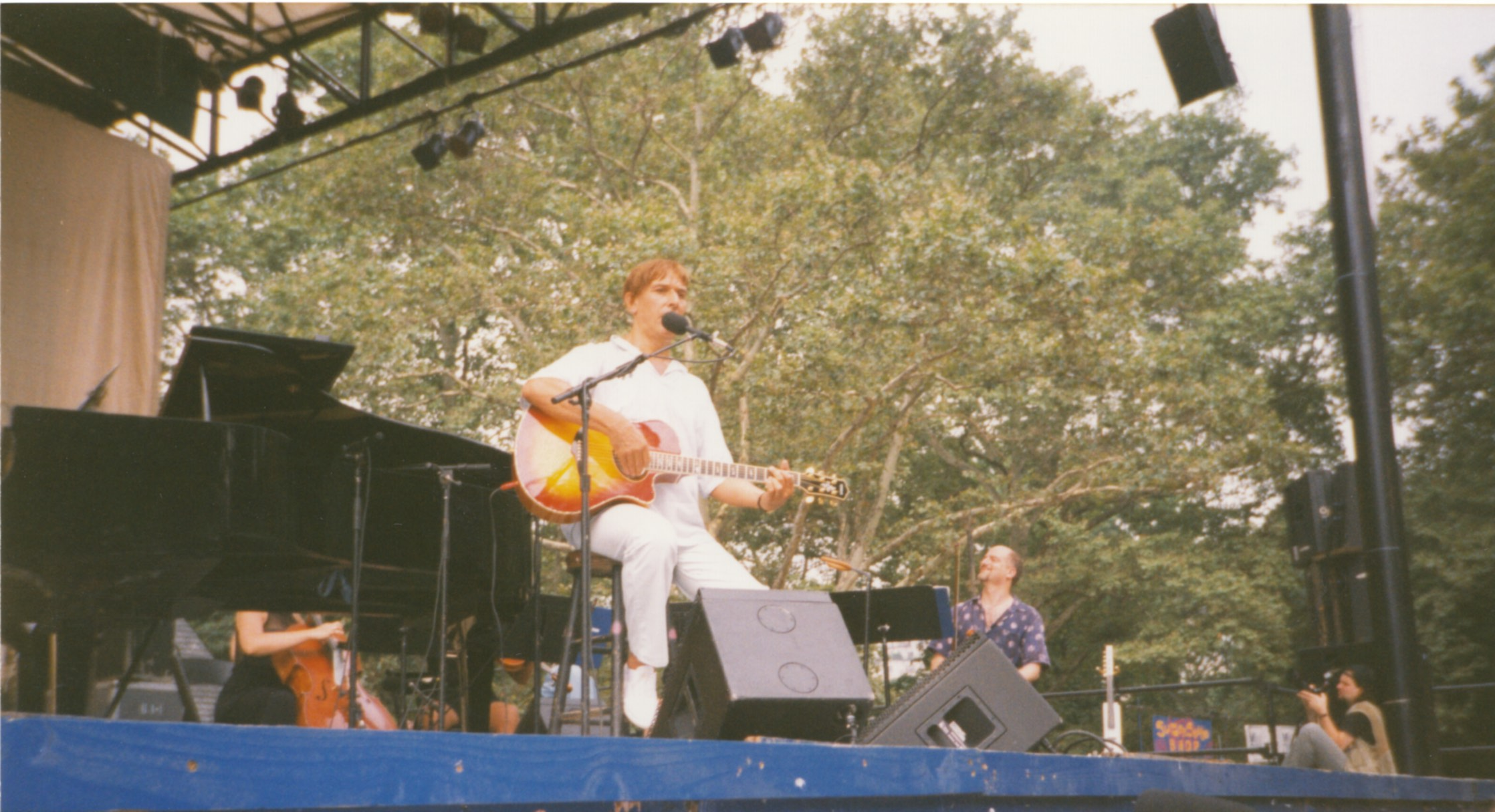
Cale performing at the Summerstage Festival in Central Park, New York, 1995

Following Andy Warhol's death in 1987, Cale again collaborated with Lou Reed on the 1990 studio album Songs for Drella, a song cycle about Warhol. The album marked an end to his 18-year estrangement from Reed. In his autobiography, Cale revealed that he resented letting Reed take charge of the project. The longstanding friction between Reed and Cale contributed to the passion and lurching frustration evident in the sound of the album, as did the ambivalent relationship Reed had to Warhol. Nevertheless, that same year, following a 20-year hiatus, the Velvet Underground reformed for a Fondation Cartier benefit show. This led to a reunion tour of Europe in 1993, documented on the live album Live MCMXCIII. A planned tour of the United States was cancelled after Cale and Reed fell out once more.

Cale again collaborated with Brian Eno on Wrong Way Up (1990), characterised by an up-tempo accessibility at odds with Cale's description of the fraught relationship between the pair. The following year, he contributed a cover version of Leonard Cohen's "Hallelujah" to the Cohen tribute album I'm Your Fan. His mid-tempo, piano arrangement formed the basis of most subsequent cover versions of the song, which has since become a standard.

In 1992, he performed vocals on two songs, "Hunger" and "First Evening", on French composer and record producer Hector Zazou's Sahara Blue, a concept album based on the poetry of Arthur Rimbaud. In 1994, Cale performed a spoken-word duet with Suzanne Vega on the song "The Long Voyage" on Zazou's studio album Chansons des mers froides. The lyrics were based on the poem "Les Silhouettes" by the Irish author Oscar Wilde, and Cale co-wrote the music with Zazou. It was later released as a single (retitled "The Long Voyages" as it featured several remixes by Zazou, Mad Professor and more).

In 1996, he played piano on "Love to Die For" by Marc Almond of Soft Cell, from his ninth solo studio album Fantastic Star. He also produced Scottish alternative rock band Goya Dress's debut studio album Rooms.

That same year, Cale released Walking on Locusts which turned out to be his only solo studio album of the decade. The record featured appearances by Talking Heads' David Byrne, the Soldier String Quartet, and original Velvet Underground drummer Moe Tucker. Throughout the rest of the 1990s, he worked primarily as a record producer or contributor to other's recordings.

Cale composed an instrumental score for a ballet titled Nico, performed by the Scapino Ballet in Rotterdam in October 1997. The score was released as Dance Music (1998). Cale has written a number of film soundtracks, often using more classically influenced instrumentation.

Cale spent much of 1998 on tour with Siouxsie Sioux, formerly of Siouxsie and the Banshees. In February, he was the curator of a one day festival called "With a Little Help from My Friends" at the Paradiso in Amsterdam with the Metropole Orkest. The concert was shown on Dutch national television and featured a song specially composed for the event and still unreleased, "Murdering Mouth", sung in duet with Siouxsie and her second band the Creatures. Cale and Siouxsie then did a double bill tour in the US for two months from late June until mid-August, both artists collaborating on stage on several songs including a version of the Velvet Underground's "Venus in Furs".

Cale's autobiography, What's Welsh for Zen?, was written in collaboration with Victor Bockris and published in 1999 by Bloomsbury Publishing.

=== 2000s ===
Cale's version of Leonard Cohen's "Hallelujah" was used in the 2001 animated film Shrek, although it did not appear on the film's soundtrack album due to licensing issues.

In 2002, Cale played piano and sang vocals on the track "Don't Pretend" by Gordon Gano of Violent Femmes, from his debut solo studio album Hitting the Ground.

Signing to EMI Records in 2003 with the EP 5 Tracks and studio album HoboSapiens, Cale again returned as a regular recording artist, this time with music influenced by modern electronica and alternative rock. The well-received album was co-produced with Nick Franglen of Lemon Jelly. It was followed by his 2005 studio album blackAcetate.

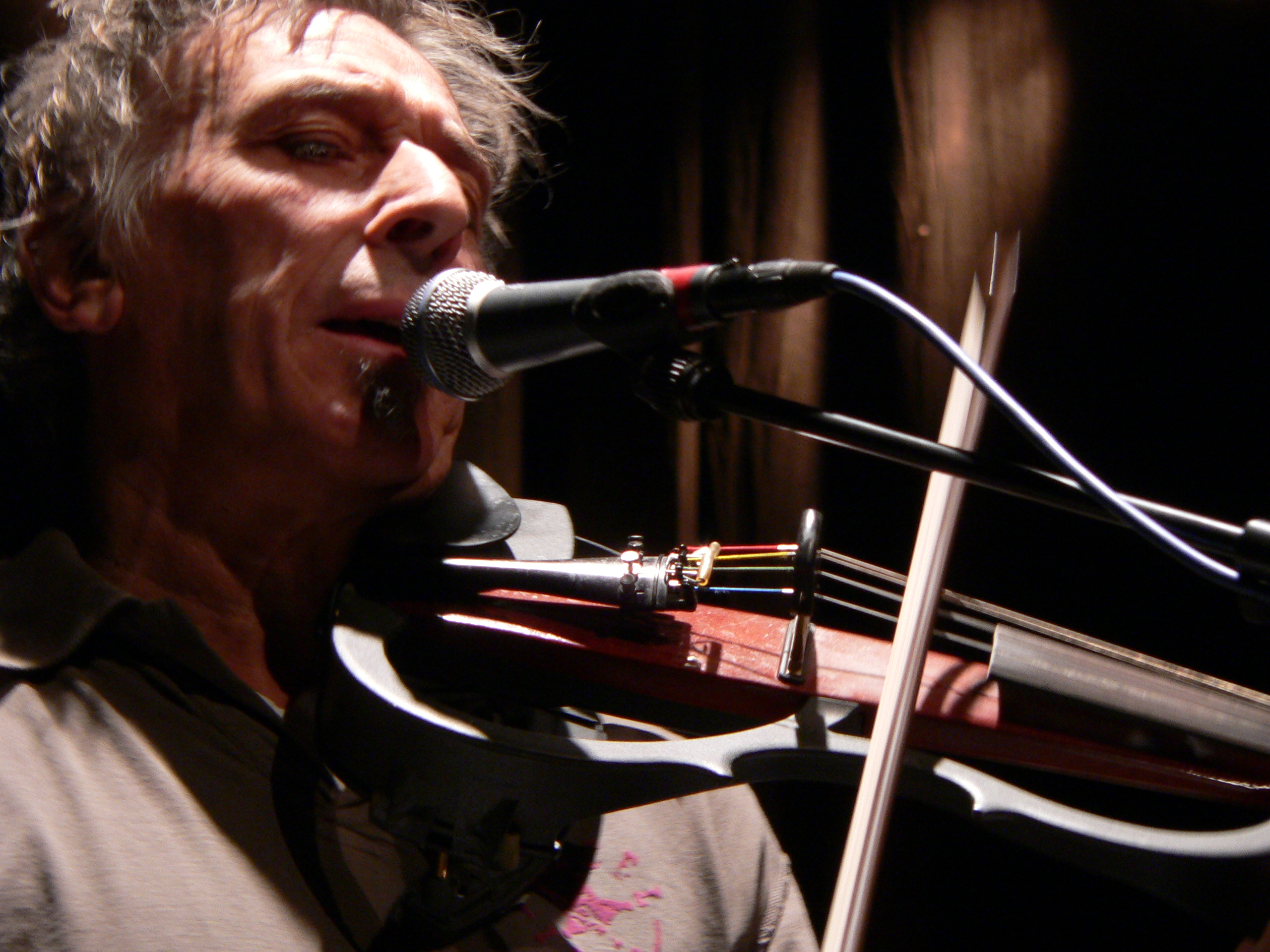
Cale performing at De Warande in Turnhout, Belgium, 2006

In 2005, Cale produced American singer-songwriter Alejandro Escovedo's eighth studio album, The Boxing Mirror, which was released in May 2006. In June 2006, Cale released a radio and digital single, "Jumbo in tha Modernworld".

In February 2007, a 23-song live retrospective, Circus Live, was released in Europe. This two-disc album, composed of recordings from both the 2004 and 2006 tours, featured new arrangements and reworkings of songs from his entire career. Of particular interest is the Amsterdam Suite, a set of songs from a performance at the Amsterdam Paradiso in 2004. A studio-created drone has been edited into these songs. The set also included a DVD, featuring electric rehearsal material and a short acoustic set, as well as the video for "Jumbo in tha Modernworld", a 2006 single.

In May 2007, Cale contributed a cover version of the song "All My Friends" by LCD Soundsystem to the vinyl and digital single releases of the LCD Soundsystem original. Cale has continued to work with other artists, contributing viola to Replica Sun Machine, the Danger Mouse-produced second studio album by London alternative pop trio the Shortwave Set and producing the second studio album of American indie band Ambulance LTD.

On 11 October 2008, Cale hosted an event to pay tribute to Nico called Life Along the Borderline in celebration of what, five days later, would have been her 70th birthday. The event was reprised at the Teatro Communale in Ferrara, Italy on 10 May 2009.

Cale represented Wales at the 2009 Venice Biennale exhibition, collaborating with artists, filmmakers, and poets, and focusing the artwork on his relationship with the Welsh language.

=== 2010s ===
In January 2010, Cale was invited to be the first Eminent Art in Residence (EAR) at the Mona Foma festival curated by Brian Ritchie of the Violent Femmes held in Hobart, Tasmania, Australia. His work for the 2009 Venice Biennale 'Dyddiau Du (dark days)' was shown at the festival, along with a number of live performances at venues around Hobart.

The Paris 1919 (1973) studio album was performed, in its entirety, at the Coal Exchange in Cardiff on 21 November 2009, at the Royal Festival Hall in London on 5 March 2010, and the Theatre Royal in Norwich on 14 May 2010. These performances were reprised in Paris, France, on 5 September 2010; Brescia, Italy, on 11 September 2010; Los Angeles, California, on 30 September 2010 at UCLA's Royce Hall; Melbourne, Australia, on 16 October 2010; Barcelona, Spain, on 28 May 2010 and Essen, Germany, on 6 October 2011.

Cale performing at UCLA's Royce Hall in Los Angeles, California, 2010

In October 2010, Cale released the two-disc live album Live at Rockpalast, recorded during his two shows for German music television show Rockpalast on 14 October 1984 at Grugahalle, Essen (first disc; with full band) and 6 March 1983 at Zeche, Bochum (second disc; Cale solo with guitar and piano). This concert is missing "Risé, Sam and Rimsky-Korsakov" (Cale, Shepard) narrated by his then-wife Risé Irushalmi.

In February 2011, Cale signed a recording contract with Domino Records subsidiary Double Six and released an EP, Extra Playful, in September 2011.

In May 2011, he and his band appeared at the Brighton Festival, performing songs to the theme of Émigré/Lost & Found. Cale appeared at the invitation of the Nobel Peace Prize winner Aung San Suu Kyi, who was the festival's guest director.

In the autumn of 2012, Cale released Shifty Adventures in Nookie Wood, his first studio album since 2005. The album features a collaboration with Danger Mouse, "I Wanna Talk 2 U". Critical reception of the album was mixed to positive, with The Guardian newspaper describing it as "an album that combines the 70-year-old's experience with the glee of a small child."

In 2014, he appeared as vendor in an episode "Sorrowsworn" of the crime drama television series The Bridge.

Cale released his sixteenth solo studio album M:FANS in January 2016. It features new versions of songs from his 1982 studio album Music for a New Society.

In July 2016, Cale performed the songs "Valentine's Day", "Sorrow" and "Space Oddity" at a late-night BBC Prom concert at the Royal Albert Hall in London, celebrating the music of David Bowie who had died earlier that year.

At the 2017 Grammy Salute to Music Legends ceremony, Cale performed with, amongst others, Moe Tucker, two Velvet Underground classics, "Sunday Morning" and "I'm Waiting for the Man". The Velvet Underground were also the recipients of the 2017 Merit Award.

In February 2019, Cale collaborated with Marissa Nadler on her new single "Poison".

In September 2019, he gave three concerts titled 2019–1964: Futurespective at the Paris' Philharmonie, inviting his compatriot Cate Le Bon to join the band.

=== 2020s ===
Cale features on the track "Corner of My Sky" from Welsh electronic musician Kelly Lee Owens' second studio album Inner Song (2020).

On 6 October 2020, Cale released a standalone single and accompanying music video called "Lazy Day".

In February 2022, Cale announced his first full UK tour in almost a decade. Cale's tour was to begin in Liverpool at the Philharmonic Hall on 15 July, before calling at Whitley Bay, York, Bexhill, Cambridge and the London Palladium, before closing out the run at Birmingham Town Hall on 25 July. However, the tour was postponed to the fall of 2022 due to some bandmembers contracting COVID-19.

In August 2022, Cale released the new track "Night Crawling", accompanied by an official animated music video by Mickey Miles. The song is a reminiscence about his friendship with David Bowie who had died in 2016. "It's been a helluva past two years and I'm glad to finally share a glimpse of what's coming ahead," Cale said in a statement. "There was this period around mid-late Seventies when David and I would run into each other in New York. There was plenty of talk about getting some work done but of course we'd end up running the streets, sometimes until we couldn't keep a thought in our heads, let alone actually get a song together!" Cale played synthesizers, bass guitar, piano and drums on the track assisted by Mars Volta drummer Deantoni Parks and guitarist Dustin Boyer. On 19 October 2022, Cale released another track, titled "Story of Blood", featuring the American chamber pop singer Weyes Blood. "Noise of You" was released as the third track on 11 January 2023. All tracks are from his seventeenth studio album Mercy. The album was released on 20 January 2023.

After further postponements, Cale finished his UK tour in 2023, adding two extra dates for Manchester, and Stroud later that year.

Cale released an official music video for "Pretty People" on 5 February 2024. The song is one of the 7" vinyl bonus tracks from the 2023 released Mercy album. The video was directed by Abigail Portner.

"How We See the Light" is the first single, accompanied by an official video, released in March 2024 and a second single and official video were released in May 2024, titled "Shark-Shark". The songs are from his eighteenth studio album, Poptical Illusion, which was released on 14 June 2024.

On 10 November 2025, the song "House" by Charli XCX was released, in which Cale featured and co-wrote, as the first single from XCX's 2026 album Wuthering Heights, a soundtrack album to Emerald Fennell's film of the same name (itself an adaptation of the 1847 Emily Brontë novel Wuthering Heights). Cale would later appear on the cover art for Charli's 2026 studio album Music, Fashion, Film, alongside Marc Jacobs and Martin Scorsese.

== Honours and legacy ==
Cale was inducted into the Rock and Roll Hall of Fame as a member of the Velvet Underground in 1996. At the ceremony, Cale, Reed, and Tucker performed a song titled "Last Night I Said Goodbye to My Friend", dedicated to Sterling Morrison, who had died the previous August due to non-Hodgkin lymphoma.

In 2000, Cale was awarded an Honorary Doctorate in Antwerp, Belgium, for "his influential and groundbreaking work in contemporary music, ballet and film music, and for his eminent contribution to the development of contemporary art."

Cale was appointed Officer of the Order of the British Empire (OBE) in the 2010 Birthday Honours for services to music and to the arts.

== Personal life ==
Cale married American fashion designer Betsey Johnson in 1968. The couple divorced in 1971 having been married for three years.

In 1971, Cale met Cynthia "Cindy" Wells (1952–1997), better known as Miss Cinderella or Miss Cindy of the GTOs, and they married soon afterwards. Their marriage was rocky, and they divorced in 1975.

On 6 December 1981, Cale married his third wife, Risé Irushalmi, and they had a daughter. They divorced in 1997.

For his 2004 appearance on BBC Radio 4's Desert Island Discs, Cale chose "She Belongs to Me" by Bob Dylan as his favourite track, Repetition (2001) by Alain Robbe-Grillet as his chosen book and an espresso machine as his luxury item.

=== Substance abuse ===
As a child, Cale suffered from severe bronchitis, which led to a doctor prescribing him opiates. He came to rely on the drugs to fall asleep. Biographer Tim Mitchell claims Cale's early dependence on medicine was a "formative experience". Cale later told an interviewer that "When I got to New York, drugs were everywhere, and they quickly became part of my artistic experiment".

While living in New York in the 1960s and 1970s, Cale extensively used cocaine. He is said to have "taken most of the available drugs in the United States." Cale has said that, "In the '60s, for me, drugs were a cool experiment... In the '70s, I got in over my head".

Cale feels that his drug addiction negatively affected his music during the 1980s, citing the negative impact of substance use on his live performances and the birth of his daughter as his primary reasons for becoming sober. In a 2009 BBC interview, he stated that the "strongest drug" he was then taking was coffee. Cale hosted the documentary Heroin, Wales and Me (2009) to promote awareness of heroin addiction in his native Wales.

== Discography ==
=== The Velvet Underground ===
- The Velvet Underground & Nico (1967)
- White Light/White Heat (1968)

=== Studio albums ===
- Vintage Violence (1970)
- The Academy in Peril (1972)
- Paris 1919 (1973)
- Fear (1974)
- Slow Dazzle (1975)
- Helen of Troy (1975)
- Honi Soit (1981)
- Music for a New Society (1982)
- Caribbean Sunset (1984)
- Artificial Intelligence (1985)
- Words for the Dying (1989)
- Walking on Locusts (1996)
- HoboSapiens (2003)
- blackAcetate (2005)
- Shifty Adventures in Nookie Wood (2012)
- M:FANS (2016)
- Mercy (2023)
- Poptical Illusion (2024)
- MiXology (Volume 1) (2025)

=== Live albums ===
- June 1, 1974 (with Kevin Ayers, Brian Eno, and Nico) 1974
- Sabotage/Live (1979)
- John Cale Comes Alive (1984)
- Even Cowgirls Get the Blues (1991)
- Fragments of a Rainy Season (1992)
- Le Bataclan '72 (with Lou Reed and Nico) 2004
- Circus Live (2007)
- Live at Rockpalast (2010)

=== Collaborative albums ===
- Church of Anthrax (1971) (with Terry Riley)
- Songs for Drella (1990) (with Lou Reed)
- Wrong Way Up (1990) (with Brian Eno)
- Last Day on Earth (1994) (with Bob Neuwirth)

=== Soundtracks and scores ===
- Straight and Narrow (Short) (1970)
- Women in Revolt (1971)
- Heat (1972)
- Caged Heat (1974)
- American Playhouse (TV Series) (1 episode)- Who Am I This Time? (1982)
- Something Wild (1986)
- The Houseguest (short) (1989)
- Dick: A Film by Jo Menell (Documentary short) (1989)
- Songs for Drella (Video) (1990)
- Paris Awakens (1991)
- Healing Hurts (1991)
- Primary Motive (1992)
- The Birth of Love (1993)
- Life Underwater (1994)
- Ah Pook Is Here (short) (1994)
- Don't Forget You're Going to Die/N'oublie pas que tu vas mourir (1995)
- Antarctica (1995)
- I Shot Andy Warhol (1996)
- Basquiat (1996)
- Rhinoceros Hunting in Budapest (1997)
- Somewhere in the City (1998)
- Night Wind (1999)
- Wisconsin Death Trip (1999)
- The Virgin (1999)
- American Psycho (2000)
- Love Me (2000)
- The King's Daughters / Saint-Cyr (2000)
- The Farewell: Brecht's Last Summer (2000)
- Y Mabinogi / Otherworld (2003)
- New Scenes from America (2003)
- Paris (2003)
- Process (2004)
- About Face: The Story of the Jewish Refugee Soldiers of World War II (2005)
- A Burning Hot Summer (2011)
- Of Women and Horses (2011)
- Paul Sanchez Is Back! (2018)

== Sources ==
- Mitchell, Tim (2003). Sedition and Alchemy: A Biography of John Cale. Peter Owen. ISBN 0-7206-1132-6.
- The New Musical Express Book of Rock, 1975, Star Books; ISBN 0-352-30074-4
