= John Cale Comes Alive =

Live album by John Cale
- Released: September 1984
- Recorded: 26 February 1984 (live tracks)
- Venues: The Lyceum (Westminster, London)
- Label: ZE
- Producer: John Cale

John Cale chronology
Caribbean Sunset (1984)	John Cale Comes Alive (1984)	Artificial Intelligence (1985)

Professional ratings
Review scores
Source	Rating
AllMusic	1.5/5 stars
Trouser Press	favourable

John Cale Comes Alive is the second live album by the Welsh rock musician John Cale, released in September 1984 by ZE Records after the previous studio album Caribbean Sunset (also 1984). It was recorded at The Lyceum in Westminster, London, England on 26 February 1984. It also includes two studio recordings "Ooh La La" and "Never Give Up on You". The album has not been released on compact disc or digital format. The US release has different versions of both studio tracks compared to the European version.

== Track listing ==
Side 1
No.	Title	Writer(s)	Original album	Length
1.	"Ooh La La"	John Cale; Larry Sloman	single	3:25
2.	"Evidence"	Cale	Sabotage/Live, 1979	3:26
3.	"Dead or Alive"	Cale	Honi Soit, 1981	3:58
4.	"Chinese Envoy"	Cale	Music for a New Society, 1982	3:27
5.	"Leaving It Up to You"	Cale	Helen of Troy, 1975	5:32

Side 2
No.	Title	Writer(s)	Original album	Length
1.	"Dr. Mudd"	Cale	Sabotage/Live, 1979	3:42
2.	"Waiting for the Man"	Lou Reed	The Velvet Underground & Nico, 1967	4:26
3.	"Heartbreak Hotel"	Mae Boren Axton; Tommy Durden; Elvis Presley	Slow Dazzle, 1975	4:16
4.	"Fear"	Cale	Fear, 1974	3:20
5.	"Never Give Up on You"	Cale; Andy Heermans; David Young; David Lichtenstein	published for the first time	4:58

Note: The US Release swaps Never Give Up On You and Ooh La La.

== Personnel ==
Musicians

- John Cale − vocals; guitar; piano; producer
- Andy Heermans − bass; engineer on "Ooh La La" and "Never Give Up on You"
- David Lichtenstein − drums; electronic drums; engineer on "Ooh La La" and "Never Give Up on You"
- David Young − guitar; engineer on "Ooh La La" and "Never Give Up on You"
- Julius Klepacz − drums on "Never Give Up on You"

Production and artwork

- Stephen Street − remix engineer
- Roddy Hui − engineer on "Ooh La La" and "Never Give Up on You"
- Frank Olinsky/Manhattan Design − art direction
- George DuBose − photography
- Sara Schwartz − cover illustration
