= Circus Live =

Live album by John Cale
- Released: 19 February 2007
- Recorded: 2004, 2006
- Label: EMI
- Producer: John Cale

John Cale chronology
blackAcetate (2005)	Circus Live (2007)	Live at Rockpalast (2010)

Professional ratings
Review scores
Source	Rating
musicOMH	4/5 stars
TimeOut London	4/5 stars
Mansized	4/5 stars
Rocklouder	3/5 stars
Culturedeluxe	8/10 stars

Circus Live is a 3-disc live album by the Welsh musician John Cale released on February 19, 2007. The contents were recorded live on the 2004 and 2006 European tours. One of the discs is a DVD containing rehearsal footage, a music video, and two audio tracks.

One performance included, September 12, 2004, at the Paradiso in Amsterdam, was broadcast on air and online.

== Track listing ==
All tracks by John Cale; except where indicated.

Disc 1
No.	Title	Writer(s)	Length
1.	"Venus in Furs" (from The Velvet Underground & Nico)	Lou Reed	6:22
2.	"Save Us" (from Helen of Troy)		3:20
3.	"Helen of Troy" (from Helen of Troy)		5:42
4.	"Woman" (from blackAcetate)		5:27
5.	"Buffalo Ballet" (from Fear)		4:07
6.	"Femme Fatale / Rosegarden Funeral of Sores" (from The Velvet Underground & Nico / "Mercenaries (Ready for War)" single)	Lou Reed / Cale	6:33
7.	"Hush" (from blackAcetate)		3:42
8.	"OuttaTheBag" (from blackAcetate)		4:44
9.	"Set Me Free" (from Walking on Locusts)		4:43
10.	"The Ballad of Cable Hogue" (from Helen of Troy)		5:06
11.	"Look Horizon" (from HoboSapiens)		5:15
12.	"Magritte" (from HoboSapiens)		4:12
13.	"Dirty Ass Rock and Roll" (from Slow Dazzle)		6:30

Disc 2
No.	Title	Writer(s)	Length
1.	"Walking the Dog" (from Sabotage/Live)	Rufus Thomas Jr.	6:11
2.	"Gun" (from Fear)		12:59
3.	"Hanky Panky Nohow" (from Paris 1919)		4:59
4.	"Pablo Picasso / Mary Lou" (from Helen of Troy / Guts)	Jonathan Richman / Cale	12:25
5.	"Drone - Into Amsterdam Suite" (studio version unreleased)		4:07
6.	"Zen" (from HoboSapiens)		5:43
7.	"Style It Takes" (from Songs for Drella)	Reed, Cale	5:14
8.	"Heartbreak Hotel" (from Slow Dazzle)	Mae Boren Axton, Tommy Durden, Elvis Presley	6:52
9.	"Mercenaries (Ready for War)" (single)		8:42
10.	"Outro Drone" (studio version unreleased)		2:43

== Personnel ==
- John Cale − lead vocal, electric and acoustic guitars, keyboards, electric viola
- Dustin Boyer (2006 tracks) − lead guitar, toys, backing vocals
- Joseph Karnes (2006 tracks) − bass, Nord 3, samples, backing vocals
- Michael Jerome (2006 tracks) − drums, samples, backing vocals
- Mark Deffenbaugh (2004 tracks) − acoustic guitar, banjo, harmonica
- Deantoni Parks (2004 tracks) − drums, samples
- Charlie Campagne (2004 tracks) − drone samples
