= Live at Rockpalast (John Cale album) =

Live album by John Cale
- Released: 25 October 2010
- Recorded: 14 October 1984; 6 March 1983
- Label: Made in Germany
- Producer: John Cale

John Cale chronology
Circus Live (2007)	Live at Rockpalast (2010)	Extra Playful (2011)

Professional ratings
Review scores
Source	Rating
AllMusic	3.5/5 stars

Live at Rockpalast is a two-disc live album by the Welsh rock musician John Cale. It was released in October 2010 on German record label Made in Germany. It was recorded during his two shows for German music television show Rockpalast on 14 October 1984 at Grugahalle, Essen (first disc; with full band) and 6 March 1983 at Zeche, Bochum (second disc; Cale solo with guitar and piano). This concert is missing "Risé, Sam and Rimsky-Korsakov" (Cale, Sam Shepard) narrated by his then-wife Risé Irushalmi.. Also released as a 2DVD.

== Track listing ==
All tracks composed by John Cale; except where indicated.

=== Disc 1 ===
1. "Autobiography" − 4:39
2. "Oh La La" (Cale, Larry Sloman) − 2:38
3. "Evidence" − 3:24
4. "Magazines" (Cale, David Young) − 3:36
5. "Model Beirut Recital" (Cale, Young) − 3:29
6. "Streets of Laredo" (traditional) − 2:40
7. "Dr. Mudd" − 3:46
8. "Leaving It Up to You" − 5:43
9. "Caribbean Sunset" (Cale, Sloman) − 4:40
10. "The Hunt“ (Cale, Young) − 3:45
11. "Fear Is a Man's Best Friend" − 3:44
12. "Heartbreak Hotel" (Mae Boren Axton, Tommy Durden, Elvis Presley) − 4:01
13. "Paris 1919" − 3:49
14. "Waiting for the Man" (Lou Reed) − 6:09
15. "Mercenaries (Ready for War)" − 9:13
16. "Pablo Picasso" / "Love Me Two Times" (Jonathan Richman / Jim Morrison, Robby Krieger, Ray Manzarek, John Densmore) − 9:03
17. "Close Watch" − 2:38

=== Disc 2 ===
1. "Ghost Story" − 2:47
2. "Ship of Fools" − 2:55
3. "Leaving It Up to You" − 3:58
4. "Amsterdam" − 2:49
5. "Child's Christmas in Wales" − 4:03
6. "Buffalo Ballet" − 2:57
7. "Antarctica Starts Here" − 2:36
8. "Taking It All Away" − 2:41
9. "Riverbank" − 3:36
10. "Paris 1919" − 3:54
11. "Guts" − 3:06
12. "Chinese Envoy" − 3:38
13. "Thoughtless Kind" − 2:14
14. "Only Time Will Tell" − 2:22
15. "Cable Hogue" − 3:37
16. "Dead or Alive" − 3:17
17. "Waiting for the Man" (Reed) − 4:46
18. "Heartbreak Hotel" (Axton, Durden, Presley) − 4:41
19. "Chorale" − 2:49
20. "Fear Is a Man's Best Friend" − 3:53
21. "Close Watch" − 2:50
22. "Streets of Laredo" (traditional) − 2:25

== Personnel ==
Musicians

- John Cale − vocals, guitars, piano
- David Lichtenstein − drums (first disc only)
- Andy Heermans − bass guitar (first disc only)
- David Young − guitars (first disc only)

Technical

- Winfried Pannen − sound engineer
- Helmut "Hoppi" Hoppenstedt − remixing; mastering
- Uwe Doms − artwork
- Peter Rüchel − executive producer
