= Elvis 56 =

Compilation album by Elvis Presley
- Released: March 5, 1996
- Recorded: January–September 1956
- Genre: Rock and roll
- Length: 50:31
- Label: RCA Records

Elvis Presley chronology
Walk a Mile in My Shoes: The Essential '70s Masters (1995)	Elvis 56 (1996)	An Afternoon in the Garden (1997)

Professional ratings
Review scores
Source	Rating
Allmusic	4.5/5 stars

Elvis 56 is a compilation album of studio master recordings by American singer and musician Elvis Presley made during 1956, released by RCA Records in 1996. The original sessions took place at RCA Studios in Nashville and New York, and at Radio Recorders in Hollywood.

== Contents ==
The disc presents five singles with five B-sides, five tracks from his debut album, and six tracks from his second long-player, Elvis. All were both recorded and released in the title year of the disc, 1956, except for "Too Much," released in January 1957. An alternate and earlier take of "Heartbreak Hotel" included is previously unreleased. "Elvis '56" also contains much more reverb and tape echo than the original recordings.

By concentrating on the rhythm numbers rather than the country material and the ballads, this compilation showcases Presley the early icon of rock and roll in the 1950s, also arguing for this particular year as being his most notable in the decade, and perhaps even that of his entire career.

== Track listing ==
Chart positions for LPs and EPs from Billboard Top Pop Albums chart; positions for singles from Billboard Pop Singles chart.

Track	Recorded	Original LP issue	Catalogue	Release date	Chart peak	Song title	Writer(s)	Time
1.	1/10/56		47-6357	1/27/56	1	Heartbreak Hotel	Mae Axton, Tommy Durden, Elvis Presley	2:08
2.	1/30/56		47-6540b	5/4/56	31	My Baby Left Me	Arthur Crudup	2:11
3.	1/30/56	Elvis Presley	LPM 1254	3/23/56	1	Blue Suede Shoes	Carl Perkins	1:58
4.	1/30/56	Elvis	LPM 1382	10/19/56	1	So Glad You're Mine	Arthur Crudup	2:20
5.	1/30/56	Elvis Presley	LPM 1254	3/23/56	1	Tutti Frutti	Dorothy LaBostrie and Richard Penniman	1:58
6.	1/30/56	Elvis Presley	LPM 1254	3/23/56	1	One-Sided Love Affair	Bill Campbell	2:09
7.	9/1/56	Elvis	LPM 1382	10/19/56	1	Love Me	Jerry Leiber and Mike Stoller	2:43
8.	9/2/56	Elvis	LPM 1382	10/19/56	1	Anyplace Is Paradise	Joe Thomas	2:26
9.	9/2/56	Elvis	LPM 1382	10/19/56	1	Paralyzed	Otis Blackwell and Elvis Presley	2:23
10.	9/2/56	Elvis	LPM 1382	10/19/56	1	Ready Teddy	Robert Blackwell and John Marascalco	1:56
11.	9/2/56		47-6800	1/4/57	1	Too Much	Lee Rosenberg and Bernard Weinman	2:31
12.	7/2/56		47-6604b	7/13/56	1	Hound Dog	Jerry Leiber and Mike Stoller	2:16
13.	7/2/56		47-6643b	9/28/56	20	Anyway You Want Me (That's How I Will Be)	Cliff Owens and Aaron Schroeder	2:13
14.	7/2/56		47-6604	7/13/56	1	Don't Be Cruel	Otis Blackwell and Elvis Presley	2:02
15.	2/3/56		47-6642b	8/31/56		Lawdy, Miss Clawdy	Lloyd Price	2:08
16.	2/3/56		47-6642	8/31/56		Shake, Rattle & Roll	Charles Calhoun	2:37
17.	4/11/56		47-6540	5/4/56	1	I Want You, I Need You, I Love You	Lou Kosloff and George Mysels	2:40
18.	9/3/56	Elvis	LPM 1382	10/19/56	1	Rip It Up	Robert Blackwell and John Marascalco	1:53
19.	1/10/56	previously unreleased				Heartbreak Hotel	Mae Axton, Tommy Durden, Elvis Presley	2:08
20.	1/10/56	Elvis Presley	LPM 1254	3/23/56	1	I Got a Woman	Ray Charles and Renald Richard	2:23
21.	1/10/56		47-6357b	1/27/56	19	I Was the One	Aaron Schroeder, Claude DeMetrius, Hal Blair, Bill Peppers	2:33
22.	1/10/56	Elvis Presley	LPM 1254	3/23/56	1	Money Honey	Jesse Stone	2:34

== Personnel ==
- Elvis Presley – vocal, guitar, piano
- Scotty Moore – guitar
- Chet Atkins – guitar
- Floyd Cramer – piano
- Shorty Long – piano
- Gordon Stoker – piano, backing vocals
- Bill Black – bass
- D.J. Fontana – drums
- The Jordanaires – backing vocals
- Ben Speer – backing vocals
- Brock Speer – backing vocals

== Charts ==
Chart (2010)	Peak position
Netherlands Top 100 Albums	69
New Zealand Top 40 Albums	47
