= Jack Stapp =

American music manager (1930–1999)

Jack Stapp (December 8, 1912 – December 20, 1980) was an American country music manager.

== Biography ==
Stapp was born in Nashville, Tennessee, United States. His family moved to Atlanta, Georgia in 1921, and Stapp was educated in that city. He became the programme controller at Georgia Tech's own radio station and oversaw its development to a commercial radio station as WGST. After relocating to New York, Stapp came to the attention of WSM (AM) back in Nashville, who made him their programme manager. After World War II, Stapp joined forces with Lou Cowan to create Tree International Publishing. Stapp co-wrote, with Harry Stone, the popular song "Chattanooga Shoe Shine Boy" (1950). By 1954, Tree Publishing's song, "By the Law of My Heart", was recorded by Benny Martin. The following year, two of Tree Publishing's songwriters, Mae Boren Axton and Tommy Durden, co-wrote "Heartbreak Hotel". By 1964, Stapp had left his radio duties behind to concentrate his efforts in expanding Tree. He later became a founder-member of the Country Music Association and held top posts with NARAS.

Stapp died in 1980, but was posthumously inducted to the Country Music Hall of Fame in 1989.

Tree International Publishing, a music publisher, is still based in Nashville.

== Bibliography ==
- The Editors of Country Music (magazine) (1994) The Comprehensive Country Music Encyclopedia, p. 365-6, ISBN 0-8129-2247-6 .
- Paul Kingsbury (ed.) (1998) The Encyclopedia of Country Music: The Ultimate Guide to the Music, p. 503, ISBN 0-19-511671-2 .
- Barry McCloud (1995) Definitive Country: The Ultimate Encyclopedia of Country Music and Its Performers, p. 761-2, ISBN 0-399-52144-5 .
