= Greatest Jukebox Hits =

Compilation album by Elvis Presley
- Released: November 18, 1997
- Genres: Rock; blues
- Length: 55:15
- Label: RCA Records

Elvis Presley chronology
Gospel Favourites (1997)	Greatest Jukebox Hits (1997)	Love Songs (1998)

Greatest Jukebox Hits is a compilation album by American rock musician Elvis Presley, issued by RCA Records in 1997, containing some of his jukebox hits.

== Background ==
The album includes well known tracks such as "Heartbreak Hotel" and "Suspicious Minds", and many more.

== Reception ==
Professional ratings
Review scores
Source	Rating
AllMusic	4/5 stars
The Rolling Stone Album Guide	3/5 stars

AllMusic's Stephen Thomas Erlewine wrote that it is a "brief but entertaining selection of some of Elvis' biggest hits" and that "only casual fans will want or need this, and it suits their limited purposes quite nicely."

== Track listing ==
No.	Title	Writer(s)	Length
1.	"Good Rockin' Tonight"	Roy Brown	2:14
2.	"Baby Let's Play House"	Arthur Gunter	2:17
3.	"Heartbreak Hotel"	Mae Boren Axton; Tommy Durden; Elvis Presley	2:09
4.	"Don't Be Cruel"	Otis Blackwell; Elvis Presley	2:03
5.	"Hound Dog"	Jerry Leiber; Mike Stoller	2:16
6.	"Too Much"	Lee Rosenberg, Bernard Weinman	2:32
7.	"All Shook Up"	Otis Blackwell; Elvis Presley	1:58
8.	"(Let Me Be Your) Teddy Bear"	Kal Mann; Bernie Lowe	1:47
9.	"Jailhouse Rock"	Jerry Leiber; Mike Stoller	2:28
10.	"Hard Headed Woman"	Claude Demetrius	1:54
11.	"I Got Stung"	Aaron Schroeder; David Hill	1:51
12.	"A Big Hunk O' Love"	Aaron Schroeder; Sid Wyche	2:15
13.	"Stuck on You"	Aaron Schroeder; John Leslie McFarland	2:20
14.	"It's Now or Never"	Aaron Schroeder; Wally Gold; Eduardo di Capua	3:16
15.	"Little Sister"	Doc Pomus; Mort Shuman	2:32
16.	"Good Luck Charm"	Aaron Schroeder; Wally Gold	2:25
17.	"She's Not You"	Jerry Leiber; Mike Stoller; Doc Pomus	2:10
18.	"Return to Sender"	Otis Blackwell; Winfield Scott	2:07
19.	"(You're the) Devil in Disguise"	Bill Giant; Bernie Baum; Florence Kaye	2:21
20.	"Viva Las Vegas"	Doc Pomus; Mort Shuman	2:22
21.	"Suspicious Minds"	Mark James	4:30
22.	"Burning Love"	Dennis Linde	2:51
23.	"Way Down"	Layng Martine Jr.	2:37
Total length:			55:15

== Charts ==
Weekly chart performance for Greatest Jukebox Hits
Chart (1997)	Peak position
UK (Music Week)	114
US Top Country Albums (Billboard)	75

== Certifications ==
Region	Certification	Certified units/sales
United States (RIAA)	Gold	500,000^{‡}
^{‡} Sales+streaming figures based on certification alone.
