= Schafe, Monster und Mäuse =

Studio album by Element of Crime
- Released: October 5, 2018
- Studio: Tritonus Tonstudio
- Label: Vertigo

Element of Crime chronology
Lieblingsfarben und Tiere (2014)	Schafe, Monster und Mäuse (2018)	Live Im Tempodrom (2019)

Professional ratings
Review scores
Source	Rating
Rolling Stone	4.5/5 stars
Musikexpress	3/6 stars

Schafe, Monster und Mäuse is the fifteenth studio album by German rock band Element of Crime, released in October 2018 by Vertigo Records. The first single, "Am ersten Sonntag nach dem Weltuntergang", was released in early August 2018. It is the final studio album to feature longtime member David Young, who died in 2022.

== Track listing ==
1. "Am ersten Sonntag nach dem Weltuntergang"
2. "Schafe, Monster und Mäuse"
3. "Ein Brot und eine Tüte"
4. "Bevor ich dich traf"
5. "Immer noch Liebe in mir"
6. "Gewitter"
7. "Die Party am Schlesischen Tor"
8. "Stein, Schere, Papier"
9. "Im Prinzenbad allein"
10. "Karin, Karin"
11. "Nimm dir, was du willst"
12. "Wenn es dunkel und kalt wird in Berlin"

== Personnel ==
Element of Crime:

- Sven Regener – vocals, trumpet, guitar, organ, arrangement
- Jakob Ilja – guitar, mandolin, ukulele
- David Young – bass
- Richard Pappik – drums, percussion, harmonica

Additional musicians:

- Ekki Busch – accordion
- Jef Labes – arrangement
- Lina Peters – alto saxophone
- Orm Finnendahl – arrangement
- Zoe Cartier – cello
- Rainer Theobald – tenor saxophone
- Alexandra Regener – vocals
- Joseph Devalle – violin
- Gabriel Adorján – violin
- Sabrina Briscik – viola
- Sebastian Hoffmann – trombone
- Alexandra Regener – choir
- Anton Kautz – choir
- Clara Parson – choir
- Estelle Metin – choir
- Jenny Buchholz – choir
- Louis Becker – choir
- Luka Faensen – choir
- Serafin Hesselmann – choir

Technical:

- Gerd Krüger – recording, mastering
- Roger Moutenot – mixing
- Fabricius Clavée – recording
