= Slow Dazzle (album) =

Studio album by John Cale
- Released: 25 March 1975
- Studios: Sound Techniques (London, UK)
- Genres: Rock; art rock; experimental rock; proto-punk
- Length: 35:49
- Label: Island
- Producer: John Cale

John Cale chronology
Fear (1974)	Slow Dazzle (1975)	Helen of Troy (1975)

Slow Dazzle is the fifth solo studio album by the Welsh rock musician John Cale, released on 25 March 1975, his second album for record label Island.

== Content ==
"Mr. Wilson" is about Brian Wilson; the Beach Boys founding member has been a strong influence on Cale's work over the years. The song reflects the strong, divisive personal struggles in Wilson's life. The music's tone fluctuates from paranoid and unhappy to warm and pleasant moment by moment.

"Heartbreak Hotel" is a cover version of the Elvis Presley 1956 song (written by Mae Boren Axton and Tommy Durden) with fundamental elements of the track changed such the singing taking in "chilling" screams and dark synthesizer elements added to the background.

The track "Guts" opens with the line "The bugger in the short sleeves fucked my wife". This refers to rock musician Kevin Ayers sleeping with Cale's wife before the concert captured on the June 1, 1974 live album; Cale related the details in his autobiography (co-written with Victor Bockris), What's Welsh for Zen, published in 1998.

"The Jeweler" is a spoken-word piece under an instrumental backdrop that recalls, at least in its poetic and freeform structure, the track "The Gift" from the Velvet Underground's second studio album White Light/White Heat (1968). While Cale speaks in a calm, monotone voice, "The Jeweller" features a drone-like set of unsettling sounds that appear to build and build without reaching a conclusion.

Track 2, "Taking It All Away", was misprinted on all Island Record CD releases of the album as "Talking It All Away".

The cover photography was by Keith Morris. It is also the second consecutive album to feature both Brian Eno and Phil Manzanera of Roxy Music.

== Release ==
Slow Dazzle was released on 25 March 1975. No singles were released off the album, although there was a promotional-only single of "Dirty-Ass Rock 'n' Roll" b/w "Heartbreak Hotel".

The album was remastered in 1996 as part of the two-CD release The Island Years, together with both Fear (1974) and Helen of Troy (1975). This compilation contains two outtakes from the Slow Dazzle sessions among various bonus tracks; also, the last Slow Dazzle track, "The Jeweller", is shortened to its LP length of 4:11 (on the album's original CD release the track is longer).

There was a month-long tour around the UK and Europe promoting the album. The musicians were Cale, Chris Spedding on guitar, Pat Donaldson on bass guitar, Timi Donald on drums and Chris Thomas on keyboards.

== Critical reception ==
Professional ratings
Review scores
Source	Rating
AllMusic	4.5/5 stars
Christgau's Record Guide	A−
The Rolling Stone Album Guide	4/5 stars
Spin Alternative Record Guide	8/10

Trouser Press described the album as "more restrained, but no less entrancing than Fear". Cale's cover of "Heartbreak Hotel" has been cited by music critic Ned Raggett as one of the best cover songs ever recorded.

== Track listing ==
All tracks composed by John Cale, except where indicated.

Side A

1. "Mr. Wilson" – 3:17
2. "Taking It All Away" – 2:59
3. "Dirty-Ass Rock 'n' Roll" – 4:44
4. "Darling I Need You" – 3:38
5. "Rollaroll" – 3:59

Side B

6. "Heartbreak Hotel" (Mae Boren Axton, Tommy Durden, Elvis Presley) – 3:14
7. "Ski Patrol" – 2:12
8. "I'm Not the Loving Kind" – 3:12
9. "Guts" – 3:27
10. "The Jeweller" – 5:07

Bonus tracks 1996 remaster

11. "All I Want Is You" – 2:55
12. "Bamboo Floor" – 3:24

== Personnel ==
Credits are adapted from the Slow Dazzle liner notes.

Musicians

- John Cale – vocals; piano; organ; clavinet
- Gerry Conway – drums
- Pat Donaldson – bass
- Timi Donald – drums
- Brian Eno – synthesizer
- Phil Manzanera – guitar
- Geoff Muldaur – harmony vocals on "Guts" and "Darling I Need You"
- Chris Spedding – guitar
- Chris Thomas – violin; electric piano
- Tony Burrows, Russell Stone, Neil Lancaster – harmony vocals on "Mr. Wilson"
- Steve Gregory – saxophone on "Darling I Need You"

Production and artwork

- John Cale – producer; cover
- John Wood – executive producer
- A. Secunda – executive producer on "Heartbreak Hotel"
- Vic Gamm – engineer
- John Wood – engineer
- Michael Wade – design
- Keith Morris – photography
