= The Island Years (John Cale album) =

Compilation album by John Cale
- Released: July 1996
- Genre: Rock
- Length: 133:11
- Label: Island

John Cale chronology
Antartida (1995)	The Island Years (1996)	Walking on Locusts (1996)

Alternative cover
- cover for Gold 2007 reissue

Professional ratings
Review scores
Source	Rating
AllMusic	4.5/5 stars

The Island Years is a double CD compilation of John Cale's work during 1974 and 1975. The collection, released in 1996, is composed of the three previously released Cale albums issued by Island Records: Fear (1974), Slow Dazzle and Helen of Troy (both 1975). The album also includes some extra tracks, B-sides, and individual tracks from other albums but the Slow Dazzle's last and experimental track "The Jeweller" was shortened to 4:11 (the same length as on the original LP of Slow Dazzle -- on the CD version of the album, the track's duration is 5:07). In 2007 The Island Years was reissued as a budget release, Gold, with the same track listing but reduced packaging.

== Track listing ==
CD 1

Fear (1974) & outtake

1. "Fear Is a Man's Best Friend" – 3:52
2. "Buffalo Ballet" – 3:28
3. "Barracuda" – 3:46
4. "Emily" – 4:21
5. "Ship of Fools" – 4:36
6. "Gun" – 8:04
7. "The Man Who Couldn't Afford to Orgy" – 4:33
8. "You Know More Than I Know" – 3:34
9. "Momamma Scuba" – 4:23
10. "Sylvia Said" – 4:07 (single B-side, remixed; leaving the original single 45 a rarity)

Slow Dazzle (1975) & outtakes

11. "All I Want Is You" – 2:55 (outtake)
12. "Bamboo Floor" – 3:24 (outtake)
13. "Mr. Wilson" – 3:15
14. "Taking It All Away" – 2:56
15. "Dirty-Ass Rock 'N' Roll" – 4:41
16. "Darling I Need You" – 3:35
17. "Rollaroll" – 3:57

CD2

1. "Heartbreak Hotel" – 3:10
2. "Ski Patrol" – 2:05
3. "I'm Not the Loving Kind" – 3:07
4. "Guts" – 3:26
5. "The Jeweller" – 4:11

Helen of Troy (1975) & outtakes

6. "My Maria" – 3:48
7. "Helen of Troy" – 4:18
8. "China Sea" – 2:30
9. "Engine" – 2:45
10. "Save Us" – 2:20
11. "Cable Hogue" – 3:30
12. "(I Keep A) Close Watch" – 3:27
13. "Pablo Picasso" – 3:20
14. "Leaving It Up to You" – 4:33
15. "Baby, What You Want Me to Do?" – 4:48
16. "Sudden Death" – 4:36
17. "You & Me" – 2:50 (outtake)
18. "Coral Moon" – 2:14 (originally replaced "Leaving It Up to You")
19. "Mary Lou" – 2:46 (outtake that originally appeared on the 1977 Guts compilation)
