= Element of Crime =

German rock band

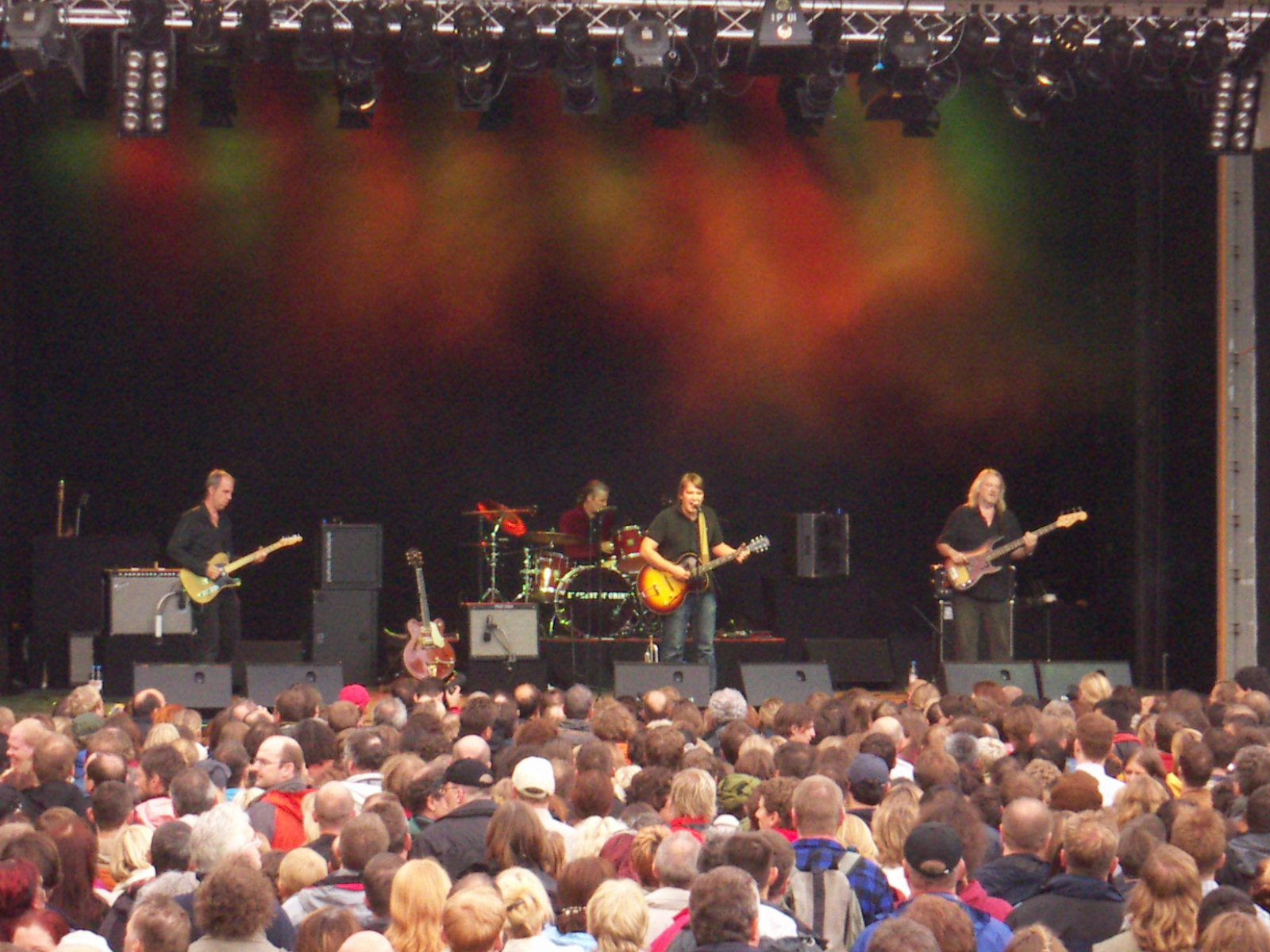
- Element of Crime in 2006 in Jena

Background information
- Origin: Berlin, Germany
- Genres: Rock
- Years active: 1985–present
- Labels: Universal; Motor Music; Polydor
- Members: Sven Regener; Jakob Friderichs; Richard Pappik
- Past members: David Young
- Website: Element of crime

Element of Crime is a German rock band that plays melancholic chanson, pop and rock music with guitar, bass guitar, drums and voice/trumpet.

== Band history ==
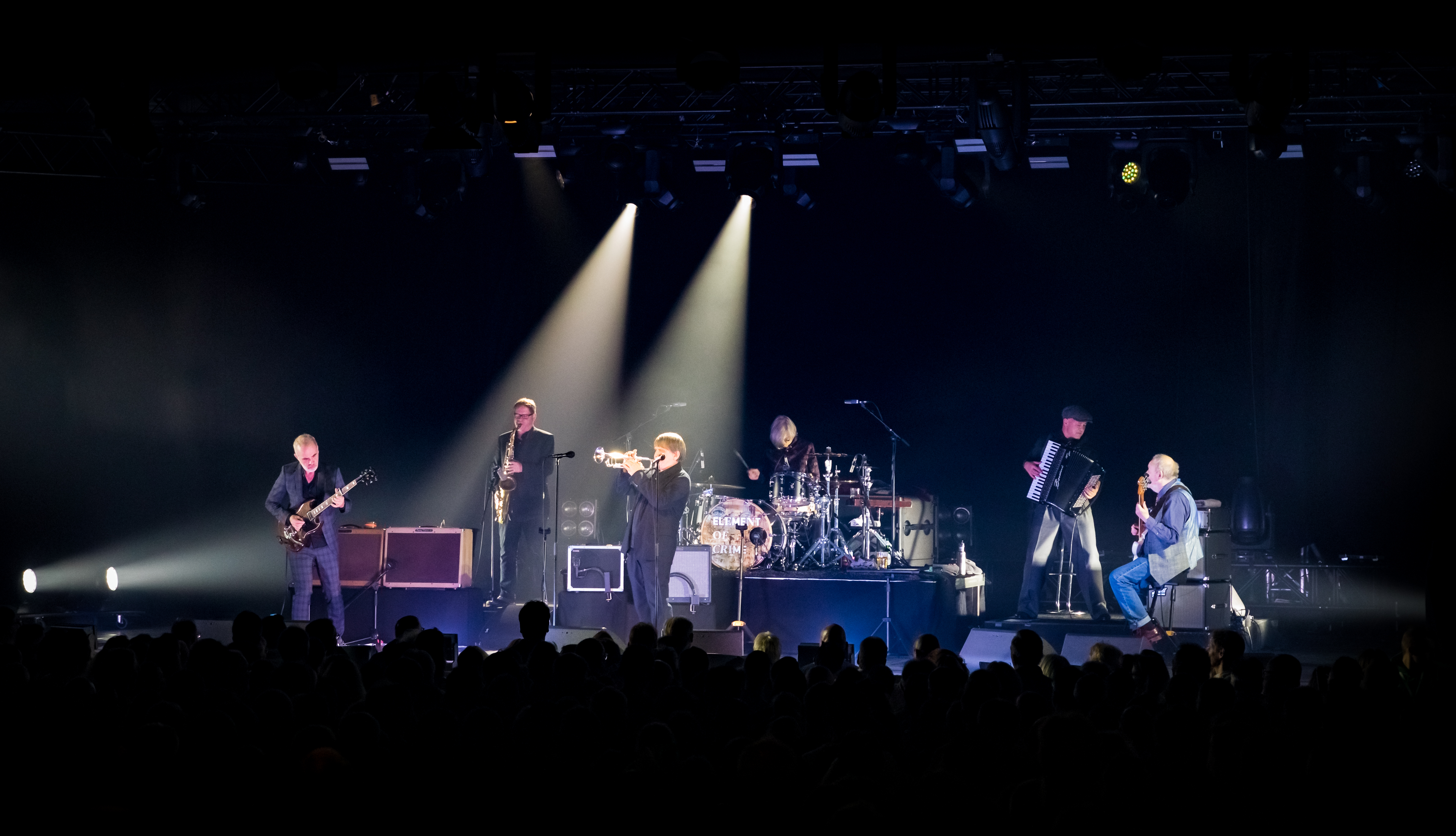
Element of Crime live at Leverkusener Jazztage 2019

The band was founded in 1985 by Sven Regener who subsequently became known as the author of the books Herr Lehmann (2001) (English title Berlin Blues), Neue Vahr Süd (2004) and Der kleine Bruder (2008) and as the screenplay writer of the film adaptation of Herr Lehmann (2003).

Regener sings and plays guitar, trumpet, accordion and piano. While various members of the band contribute music to the songs, Regener writes most of the lyrics – in English for the first few albums and then in German. The band's name is borrowed from the title of the movie The Element of Crime by Lars von Trier.

== Discography ==
=== Albums ===
- Basically Sad (1986; Polydor)
- Try to Be Mensch (1987; Polydor)
- Freedom, Love & Happiness (1988; Polydor)
- The Ballad of Jimmy & Johnny (1989; Polydor)
- Live: Crime Pays (1990; Polydor)
- Damals hinterm Mond (1991; Polydor)
- Weißes Papier (1993; Polydor)
- Dicte-moi ta loi (limited international version of Weißes Papier, 2,000 pressings; 1993; Polydor
- An einem Sonntag im April (1994; Motor Music)
- Die schönen Rosen (1996; Motor Music)
- Psycho (1999; Motor Music)
- Romantik (2001; Motor Music)
- 1985–1990 (Best Of; 2002; Motor Music)
- 1991–1996 (Best Of; 2002; Motor Music)
- Mittelpunkt der Welt (2005; Universal)
- Robert Zimmermann wundert sich über die Liebe (Original soundtrack; 2008; Universal)
- Immer da wo du bist bin ich nie (2009; Universal; GER: #2, Gold)
- Fremde Federn (2010; Universal; GER: #28)
- Lieblingsfarben und Tiere (2014; Universal; GER: #3)
- Schafe, Monster und Mäuse (2018; Universal; GER: #2)
- Morgens um vier (2023; Universal)

=== Singles ===
- Something Was Wrong (1987; Polydor)
- Nervous and Blue (1987; Polydor)
- Long Long Summer (1988; Polydor)
- Murder in Your Eyes (1988; Polydor)
- The Ballad of Jimmy and Johnny (Promo-Single; 1989; Polydor)
- Satellite Town (1990; Polydor)
- Surabaya Johnny (live) (1990; Polydor)
- Mach das Licht aus, wenn Du gehst (1991; Polydor)
- Damals hinterm Mond (1992; Polydor)
- Blaulicht und Zwielicht (1992/1993; Polydor)
- Immer unter Strom (1993; Polydor)
- Schwere See (1993; Polydor)
- Sperr mich ein (1993; Polydor)
- Mehr als sie erlaubt (1993; Motor Music)
- An einem Sonntag im April (1994; Motor Music)
- Mein dein Tag (1994; Motor Music)
- Die schönen Rosen (1996; Motor Music)
- Wenn der Morgen graut (1996; Motor Music)
- Element of Crime playing the fantastic Bee Gees classic “I started a joke” (1998; Motor Music)
- Jung und schön (Promo-Single; 1999; Motor Music)
- Du hast mir gesagt (1999; Motor Music)
- Michaela sagt (1999; Motor Music)
- Irgendwo im Nirgendwo (2000; Motor Music)
- Seit der Himmel (Promo-Single; 2001; Motor Music)
- Die Hoffnung, die du bringst (Promo-Single; 2001; Motor Music)
- Delmenhorst (2005; Universal)
- Straßenbahn des Todes (2006; Universal)
- Ein Hotdog unten am Hafen (2008; Universal)
- Immer da wo du bist bin ich nie (2009; Vertigo)
- Am Ende denk ich immer nur an dich (2009; Vertigo)
- Der weiße Hai (Promo-Single; 2010; Vertigo)
- Lieblingsfarben und Tiere (2014; Vertigo)

=== Sampler and soundtrack contributions ===
- “Heimweh” on the soundtrack of “Die fetten Jahre sind vorbei” (2004)
- “Leider nur ein Vakuum” on “Hut ab! Hommage an Udo Lindenberg”
- “Auf der Espressomaschine” on “The Return of the Furious Swampriders”
- “Motorcycle Song” on “Furious Swampriders”
- “My Bonnie Is Over the Ocean” and “It's All Over Now, Baby Blue” on the soundtrack of “NVA” (2005)
- “Und du wartest” and “Wenn der Morgen graut” Sex II. Sibylle Berg, Audio-CD, Reclam, Leipzig (1999), ISBN 3-379-00771-4

=== Cover versions ===
Polish singer MI-JA Aga (Agnieszka Zgrzywa) released Polish versions of eleven songs from Element of Crime in September 2023 under the title To Wszystko Bierzemy (All that comes with)
