= Leaving It Up to You =

Leaving It Up to You may refer to:

- "Leaving It Up to You", song by John Cale from Helen of Troy (album)
- "Leaving It Up to You", song by George Ezra from Wanted on Voyage 2014
- "I'm Leaving It Up to You", song
