= Mittelpunkt der Welt =

Studio album by Element of Crime
- Released: 2005
- Studio: Tritonus Tonstudio
- Length: 42:36
- Labels: Universal, Polydor
- Producer: David Young

Element of Crime chronology
Romantik (2001)	Mittelpunkt der Welt (2005)	Immer da wo du bist bin ich nie (2009)

Mittelpunkt der Welt is the eleventh studio album by German rock band Element of Crime, released in 2005 by Universal/Polydor Records. The album was recorded in Tritonus Tonstudio in Berlin and it was produced by David Young. It is their first album with Young as an official member of the band after working with the band as a producer and touring guitarist since the late 1980s.

The album reached number 6 on the German chart, making it their biggest success to date. It was awarded gold in 2007. It was described as "snappy, concise and musically straightforward" by Tilman Spreckelsen in his review for Frankfurter Allgemeine Zeitung.

== Track listing ==
1. "Delmenhorst" – 3:56
2. "Wenn der Winter kommt" – 4:34
3. "Straßenbahn des Todes" – 4:11
4. "Im Himmel ist kein Platz mehr für uns zwei" – 3:51
5. "Nur mit Dir" – 4:01
6. "Finger weg von meiner Paranoia" – 5:13
7. "Still wird das Echo sein" – 3:15
8. "Weit ist der Weg" – 3:49
9. "Die letzte U-Bahn geht später" – 3:11
10. "Mittelpunkt der Welt" – 6:41

== Personnel ==
Element of Crime:

- Sven Regener – vocals, guitar, trumpet, keyboards
- Jakob Ilja – guitar, mandolin, keyboards, lap steel guitar
- David Young – bass, percussion
- Richard Pappik – drums, percussion, harmonica

Additional musicians:

- Ekki Busch – accordion
- Orm Finnendahl – string arrangements
- Patrick Sepec – cello
- Rainer Theobald – saxophone, clarinet
- Uwe Langer – trombone
- Sabrina Briscik – viola
- Andreas Pfaff – violin
- Tobias Rempe – violin
