= Ratso =

Ratso may refer to:

== People ==
- nickname of John Hiller (born 1943), Canadian former Major League Baseball relief pitcher
- nickname of Larry Sloman, American author best known for his collaboration with Howard Stern

== Fictional characters ==
- "Ratso" Rizzo, a main character in the film Midnight Cowboy and the novel on which it is based
- Ratso the Rat, on the 1981 Saturday morning cartoon The Kwicky Koala Show
- Ratso, on the 2000–2005 American animated TV show Jackie Chan Adventures
- Ratso, on the 1988–1989 anime Wowser
- Ratso, on the 1970–1971 American animated TV show Groovie Goolies
- Ratso, in the films The Brave Little Toaster to the Rescue and The Brave Little Toaster Goes to Mars
