= Reefer Madness (disambiguation) =

Reefer Madness is a 1936 anti-marijuana propaganda film.

Reefer Madness may also refer to:

- Reefer Madness (musical), a 1998 musical satire of the 1936 film, or the title song
  - Reefer Madness: The Movie Musical, a 2005 television film version of the musical
- "Reefer Madness" (That '70s Show), an episode of That '70s Show
- Reefer Madness (Sloman book), a 1979 book by Larry "Ratso" Sloman
- Reefer Madness (Schlosser book), a 2003 book by Eric Schlosser
- "Reefer Madness", a song by Hawkwind from Astounding Sounds, Amazing Music
- "Reefer Madness", a song by Screaming Jets from The Screaming Jets
- "Reefer Madness", a song by UB40 from Signing Off
- "Reefer Madness", additional downloadable content to the 2011 video game L.A. Noire
