= Caribbean Sunset =

Studio album by John Cale
- Released: January 1984
- Studio: Right Track (New York City)
- Genre: Rock
- Length: 36:59
- Label: ZE
- Producer: John Cale

John Cale chronology
Music for a New Society (1982)	Caribbean Sunset (1984)	John Cale Comes Alive (1984)

John Cale studio album chronology
Music for a New Society (1982)	Caribbean Sunset (1984)	Artificial Intelligence (1985)

Singles from Caribbean Sunset
- 1. "Hungry for Love" Released: 1984; 2. "Villa Albani" Released: 1984

Caribbean Sunset is the ninth solo studio album by the Welsh rock musician John Cale, released in January 1984 by ZE Records.

Caribbean Sunset became Cale's only studio album to chart on the Dutch Album Top 100, peaking at No. 28.

== Release ==
Caribbean Sunset was released on vinyl and cassette in 1984 by ZE Records. It was reissued on vinyl by Mango in 1990. Both the ZE and Mango vinyl versions are now out of print.

"Villa Albani" was released as a 12" single in Germany. "Caribbean Sunset" was issued as a promo 7" in the UK.

To date, the album remains unavailable on CD or MP3, though a remastered download with two bonus tracks was made available on the ZE Records website in 2011.

The album features contributions from Brian Eno and an otherwise "young unknown" band, that consisted of David Young on guitar, Andrew Heermans on bass guitar, and David Lichtenstein (son of artist Roy Lichtenstein) on drums.

The cover photograph was taken by Risé Irushalmi Cale.

== Critical reception ==
Professional ratings
Review scores
Source	Rating
AllMusic	1.5/5 stars
Rolling Stone	3/5 stars

Upon release, Caribbean Sunset received negative reviews from critics. In a retrospective review for AllMusic, critic Stewart Mason panned the album, calling it "something of a mess. The songs are among the poppiest of Cale's career, and one gets the sense that it's meant to be Cale's attempt at a straight-up pop album, especially given the Jimmy Buffett-like title and cover photo." Ira Robbins of Trouser Press called it his "least interesting album to date", adding that "even if the puzzlingly muddy self-production hadn't stifled everything but his jagged-edged vocals, the songs themselves are too flimsy to support his words or passion."

== Track listing ==
All tracks are written by John Cale and Dave Young, except where noted.

Side one
No.	Title	Writer(s)	Length
1.	"Hungry for Love"		3:48
2.	"Experiment Number 1"	John Cale	5:45
3.	"Model Beirut Recital"		4:15
4.	"Caribbean Sunset"	Cale; Larry Sloman	4:23

Side two
No.	Title	Writer(s)	Length
5.	"Praetorian Underground"		3:09
6.	"Magazines"		3:26
7.	"Where There's a Will"	Cale; Sloman	2:44
8.	"The Hunt"		3:56
9.	"Villa Albani"	Cale	5:33
Total length:			36:59

Bonus tracks on 2011 remastered download
No.	Title	Writer(s)	Length
10.	"Villa Albani" (Long Version)	Cale	6:28
11.	"Villa Albani" (Instrumental Version)	Cale	5:31

== Personnel ==
Adapted from the Caribbean Sunset liner notes.

Musicians

- John Cale – vocals; keyboards; guitar
- Dave Young – guitar; backing vocals
- Andy Heermans – bass guitar; backing vocals
- David Lichtenstein – drums; boobams
- Brian Eno – AMS pitch changer (effects)

Production

- John Cale – producer; mixing
- Tom Roberts – associate producer
- Tim "Thilby" Crich – assistant engineer
- David Schecterson – assistant engineer
- Andy Heermans – engineer on "Magazines"
- Rob O'Connor – sleeve design
- Risé Irushalmi Cale – cover photography

== Charts ==
Chart	Peak position
Dutch Albums (Album Top 100)	28
