= Berlin Blues (film) =

2003 film

- Directed by: Leander Haußmann
- Written by: Sven Regener
- Produced by: Claus Boje
- Starring: Christian Ulmen; Katja Danowski; Detlev Buck
- Cinematography: Frank Griebe
- Edited by: Peter R. Adam
- Distributed by: Beta Film GmbH; Delphi Filmverleih Produktion; Universal Pictures; Filmcoopi Zürich; Filmladen
- Release date: 2 October 2003
- Running time: 109 minutes
- Country: Germany
- Language: German

Berlin Blues (German: Herr Lehmann) is a 2003 German film by Leander Haußmann, based on the novel of the same name by Sven Regener.

== Plot summary ==
Frank Lehmann (Christian Ulmen) is a bartender working in Kreuzberg, a borough of West Berlin in October 1989, in the final weeks before the fall of the Berlin Wall. As he is approaching his 30th birthday, his friends start teasing him, by calling him "Herr Lehmann" (Mr. Lehmann). He has little interest in anything outside of SO 36, the eastern part of the borough of Kreuzberg. He has a brief relationship with Katrin (Katja Danowski), a cook at a nearby bar. His best friend, Karl (Detlev Buck), slowly goes mad and his parents show up for a visit, disrupting his laid-back lifestyle.

== Cast ==
- Christian Ulmen as Herr Lehmann
- Katja Danowski as Katrin
- Detlev Buck as Karl
- Janek Rieke as Kristall-Rainer
- Annika Kuhl as Heidi
- Hartmut Lange as Erwin
- Martin Olbertz as Marco
- Uwe-Dag Berlin as Jürgen
- Michael Beck as Klaus
- Michael Gwisdek as Hans
- Stephan Baumecker as Kiffer
- Tim Fischer as Sylvio
- Karsten Speck as Lederuschi Detlef
- Margit Bendokat as Mutter Lehmann
- Adam Oest as Vater Lehmann
- Sven Martinek as Polizist 1
- Bernhard Schütz as Polizist 2
- Fabian Oscar Wien as Rudi
- Heidi Züger as Christine
- Christoph Waltz as Arzt
- Thomas Brussig as DDR-Zöllner
- Pepe Danquart as Walter vom „Elefanten“

== Awards ==
At the 2004 German Film Awards, Detlev Buck was awarded Best Supporting Actor and Sven Regener for Best Script.

At the 2003 Bavarian Film Awards, Christian Ulmen was awarded Best Actor.
