= Tree International Publishing =

- Formerly: Tree Publishing Company; Tree Music Publishing; Tree Publishing Co., Inc.
- Type: Private company
- Industry: Music publishing
- Founded: 1951
- Founder: Jack Stapp; Lou Cowan
- Defunct: 1989
- Fate: Acquired by CBS Records
- Successor: Sony Music Publishing
- Headquarters: Nashville, Tennessee, U.S.
- Key people: Jack Stapp (founder, president, chairman); Buddy Killen (song plugger, president, owner); Donna Hilley (executive vice president)
- Products: Music publishing

Tree International Publishing (also known as Tree Publishing Company, Tree Music Publishing, or Tree Publishing Co., Inc.) was a major American music publisher based in Nashville, Tennessee. Founded in 1951, it grew to become one of the most successful and influential country music publishers in the United States, credited with helping establish Nashville as "Music City." As the last major music publisher independently owned and operated in Nashville, it was sold to CBS Records in 1989. Its catalog is now part of Sony Music Publishing.

== History ==
Tree Publishing Company was founded in 1951 by Nashville radio executive Jack Stapp (program director at WSM and manager of the Grand Ole Opry) and New York media executive Lou Cowan.

In 1953, Stapp hired 20-year-old musician Buddy Killen as a song plugger and demo singer. In 1955–1956 Killen discovered the song "Heartbreak Hotel" (written by Mae Boren Axton and Tommy Durden) and persuaded a young Elvis Presley to record it, giving Tree its first major national hit.

In 1957, Stapp bought out Cowan’s interest and transferred 30% ownership to Killen. Stapp left WSM that year to focus more on Tree and named Killen to handle daily operations. The company signed songwriter Roger Miller in 1958; his hits helped Tree earn more than $1 million annually in royalties by the early 1960s.

Tree expanded rapidly in the 1960s. It signed or developed writers including Curly Putman ("Green, Green Grass of Home"), Bobby Braddock, Sonny Throckmorton, and Rafe Van Hoy. In 1969, Tree acquired Pamper Music, doubling its catalog and adding songs by Willie Nelson, Hank Cochran, and Harlan Howard. The firm also established international affiliates and was renamed Tree International Publishing.

In 1975, Stapp became board chairman and CEO, with Killen as president. Tree maintained a large staff of exclusive songwriters and operated its own 24-track studio, The Sound Shop.

Stapp died on December 20, 1980. Killen purchased his remaining interest and became sole owner. Under Killen, the company continued to grow through catalog acquisitions and launched the gospel imprint Meadowgreen Music in 1981 under executive vice president Donna Hilley. Tree was the leading country music publisher on the Billboard charts for 14 consecutive years.

In January 1989, Killen sold Tree International Publishing to CBS Records (later part of Sony) for an estimated $30–40 million. At the time the catalog contained approximately 35,000 songs, and the sale marked the end of independent major-publisher ownership in Nashville.

== Notable songwriters and catalog highlights ==
Tree's roster and acquisitions included many of country music's most important songwriters. Notable examples include:

- Roger Miller (signed 1958; hits such as "King of the Road")
- Curly Putman ("Green, Green Grass of Home"; co-wrote "He Stopped Loving Her Today" with Bobby Braddock)
- Bobby Braddock
- Sonny Throckmorton
- Rafe Van Hoy
- Dottie West
- Dolly Parton (early compositions)
- Bill Anderson
- Harlan Howard, Willie Nelson, and Hank Cochran (via 1969 Pamper Music acquisition)
- Material associated with Buck Owens, Jim Reeves, Merle Haggard, and others through later catalog purchases

The catalog also includes "Heartbreak Hotel", numerous Patsy Cline classics such as "Crazy", Hank Williams and Don Gibson copyrights (via acquisitions), and many other country, pop, and gospel standards.

== Legacy ==
Tree International was instrumental in Nashville's rise as a music publishing powerhouse. Its success demonstrated the viability of independent country-focused publishing and helped launch the careers of dozens of songwriters. After the 1989 sale, the catalog became a cornerstone of Sony Music Publishing's Nashville operations (later operating as Sony/ATV Tree before full integration).
