= Glenn Reeves =

American singer-songwriter (1930-1998)

Glenn Reeves.

Glenn Reeves (born Floyd Glenn Reeves December 29, 1930 - November 19, 1998) was an American singer-songwriter and radio deejay. He released eight singles in his recording career, but is best-remembered for his demo of the song "Heartbreak Hotel" which later became Elvis Presley's first number one hit.

== Biography ==
Reeves was raised in Shamrock, Texas; while in high school he formed his first band which played Western swing music. He studied briefly at the University of Houston before serving in the Korean War. After returning from the military, he received a position as a radio deejay on KCTX (AM) Radio in Childress. In 1955, Reeves recorded his debut single "I'm Johnny on the Spot" for record producer Bob Tanner's TNT Records. Reeves recorded an additional single for the label in the same year. A frequent collaborator with him was Mae Boren Axton, a high school teacher with a background in musical promotion who co-wrote all four of Reeves' TNT sides.

Axton, who was tasked with writing a song for Elvis Presley, worked most frequently with steel guitarist Tommy Durden, culminating with the basis for the song "Heartbreak Hotel", in October 1955. The duo asked for Reeves' help, but remarked it was "the silliest thing I've ever heard" after he heard the title of the track. Nonetheless, Axton recorded an initial version with Durden before Reeves returned, and agreed to record his own demo of "Heartbreak Hotel" in a style similar to Presley's. Reeves refused an offer to be co-credited with the song, but, when Presley recorded it, he duplicated Reeves's own phrasing; "Elvis was even breathing in the same places that Glenn did on the dub" Durbin later recalled. It was Presley's first record for RCA Records and also the first of a string of number one hits.

Reeves continued to work with Axton and Durden on compositions like "Honey Bop" for Wanda Jackson and "Rockin' Country Style", a rock and roll tune which Reeves recorded in June 1956 for Atco Records. Both "Rockin' Country Style" and an earlier single distributed by Republic Records were produced by Murray Nash in Nashville. When Atco showed no interest in renewing his recording contract, Nash and Axton advertised Reeves's services around Nashville and secured a four-record deal with Decca Records. He recorded in 1957 and 1958 with little success, and later focused on the music scene in Florida disc jockeying on WQIK Radio and hosting his own country music show. In the 1970s and 1980s, Reeves became the executive producer of Jamboree USA, a long-running barn dance show, while promoting several successful country music festivals.

Reeves died of cancer in 1998 at 67 years old. In 2011, Bear Family Records released Johnny on the Spot: Gonna Shake This Shack Tonight, a compilation album of Reeves's recorded works, including his demo of "Heartbreak Hotel".
