= Artificial Intelligence (John Cale album) =

Studio album by John Cale
- Released: 6 September 1985
- Recorded: Strongroom Studios (Shoreditch, London)
- Genres: Pop rock; new wave
- Length: 42:07
- Label: Beggars Banquet
- Producer: John Cale

John Cale chronology
| John Cale Comes Alive (1984) | Artificial Intelligence (1985) | Even Cowgirls Get the Blues (live 1979) (1987) |

John Cale studio album chronology
| Caribbean Sunset (1984) | Artificial Intelligence (1985) | Words for the Dying (1989) |

Singles from Artificial Intelligence
- 1. "Dying on the Vine" Released: 1985; 2. "Satellite Walk" Released: 1985

Artificial Intelligence is the tenth solo studio album by the Welsh rock musician John Cale, released on 6 September 1985 by Beggars Banquet Records.

== Background and recording ==
Artificial Intelligence was originally titled Black Rose. The title and some changes to the tracks delayed the album being released for five weeks.

Having produced Nico's sixth and final studio album Camera Obscura (1985), Cale recorded this album in three weeks at Strongroom Studios with her backing band, the Faction, with a couple of additional musicians. The duo of Gill O'Donovan and Susie O'List who performed backing vocals on this album had previously performed backing vocals on tours with Eurythmics.

Larry Sloman, who had co-written two tracks for Cale's previous studio album, Caribbean Sunset (1984), co-wrote the majority of the lyrics for this album, with "Dying on the Vine" being almost entirely written by him.

Graham Dowdall, who played percussion on the album, reflected that "[working on the album was] not a great experience, to be honest. Everyday started productively – until the coke and the champagne hit a certain wall, then it would get horrible. He'd lock us out of the studio. He'd erase really good bits and cover everything with guitar solos. By four in the morning, five in the morning, great tracks had been ruined."

Following the chaotic period during which the album (and the previous two) had been recorded, John and Risé Irushalmi Cale's daughter Eden was born, which promptly caused Cale to kick his addictions to alcohol and cocaine, and to temporarily abandon recording studio albums and performing live in favour of other projects (until 1989's Words for the Dying).

In a 2005 interview, Cale spoke of how he wished that more people had listened to Artificial Intelligence, as he felt that there were "some very good songs on there."

== Release ==
Artificial Intelligence was released on 6 September 1985 by Beggars Banquet Records, his only release for the label. "Dying on the Vine" was released as a single in the UK and "Satellite Walk" (Remixed by Carl Beatty) in the UK and Germany. The otherwise unavailable instrumental track "Crash Course in Harmonics" was on the B-side of "Dying on the Vine".

Along with Words for the Dying, it's one of only two studio albums available for download on Cale's Bandcamp.

== Critical reception ==
Professional ratings
Review scores
| Source | Rating |
|---|---|
| AllMusic | 2.5/5 stars |
| The Encyclopedia of Popular Music | 3/5 stars |
| The New Rolling Stone Album Guide | 3.5/5 stars |

In a retrospective review for AllMusic, critic Stewart Mason described the album as "an encouraging partial return to form." Trouser Press wrote: "Moody and contained, but energetic and occasionally stimulating, A.I. is a reasonable if unspectacular addition to Cale's extensive catalogue."

== Track listing ==
All tracks are written by John Cale and Larry Sloman, except where noted.

Side one
| No. | Title | Writer(s) | Length |
|---|---|---|---|
| 1. | "Everytime the Dogs Bark" | John Cale; Larry Sloman; David Young | 4:17 |
| 2. | "Dying on the Vine" | | 5:18 |
| 3. | "The Sleeper" | | 5:53 |
| 4. | "Vigilante Lover" | Cale; Sloman; Young | 4:27 |
| 5. | "Chinese Takeaway (Hong Kong 1997)" | | 3:44 |

Side two
| No. | Title | Length |
|---|---|---|
| 6. | "Song of the Valley" | 5:06 |
| 7. | "Fadeaway Tomorrow" | 3:25 |
| 8. | "Black Rose" | 4:58 |
| 9. | "Satellite Walk" | 4:58 |
| Total length: | | 42:07 |

== Personnel ==
Adapted from the Artificial Intelligence liner notes.

Musicians

- John Cale – vocals; bass guitar; guitar; keyboards; viola
- David Young – guitar
- James Young – keyboards
- Graham Dowdall – percussion
- Gill O'Donovan – backing vocals
- Susie O'List – backing vocals

Production and artwork

- John Cale – producer
- David Young – associate producer
- Dennis P. Nechvatal – design; artwork from the painting Warrior
- Karin Preus – artwork; graphics
- Phil Bodger – mixing; recording
- Alan Jakoby – recording

== See also ==
- List of albums released in 1985
- John Cale's discography
