= BlackAcetate =

blackAcetate

Studio album by John Cale
- Released: 3 October 2005 (UK)
- Studio: The Lair (Los Angeles, California)
- Genre: Art rock; art pop
- Length: 53:13
- Label: EMI
- Producer: John Cale; Herb Graham Jr.; Mickey Petralia

John Cale chronology
Process (2005)	blackAcetate (2005)	Circus Live (2007)

Singles from blackAcetate
- 1. "Turn the Lights On" Released: August 2005; 2. "Perfect" Released: 17 October 2005; 3. "Outta the Bag" Released: January 2006

Professional ratings
Aggregate scores
Source	Rating
Metacritic	63/100
Review scores
Source	Rating
AllMusic	4/5 stars
The Independent	3/5 stars
Mojo	4/5 stars
NME	8/10
Pitchfork	4.4/10
PopMatters	5/10
Q	3/5 stars
Stylus	C
Uncut	3/5 stars
URB	3/5 stars

blackAcetate is a 2005 solo studio album by the Welsh rock musician John Cale, his second and last album for EMI.

"Perfect" was released as a single in the UK two weeks after the album, and was subsequently included in The Sunday Times' list of the top 20 pop songs of the year.

== Track listing ==
All tracks are written by John Cale.

No.	Title	Length
1.	"Outta the Bag"	3:54
2.	"For a Ride"	3:55
3.	"Brotherman"	3:32
4.	"Satisfied"	3:54
5.	"In a Flood"	4:53
6.	"Hush"	3:26
7.	"Gravel Drive"	4:23
8.	"Perfect"	3:21
9.	"Sold-Motel"	4:53
10.	"Woman"	5:07
11.	"Wasteland"	4:11
12.	"Turn the Lights On"	3:46
13.	"Mailman (The Lying Song)"	4:04
Total length:		53:13

== Personnel ==
- John Cale − vocals, guitars, keyboards
- Herb Graham Jr. − drums, programming, percussion
- David Levita − guitars
- Natalie Porter − background vocals
- Musiic Galloway − background vocals
- Jaspr Baj − background vocals
- Mark Deffenbaugh − guitars, banjo
- John Crozova − cello
- Dustin Boyer − guitar, backing vocals
- Joe Karnes − bass
- Michael Jerome − drums, backing vocals
- Charlie Campagna − atmospheres

Technical

- Nita Scott − executive producer
- Herb Graham Jr. − co-producer (tracks 1–8, 10–13)
- Mickey Petralia − mixing engineer
- Scott Gutierrez − assistant mixing engineer
- Rick Myers − artwork, design (uncredited)
