= Process (John Cale album) =

Soundtrack album by John Cale
- Released: 9 August 2005
- Genre: Classical
- Length: 66:29
- Label: Syntax
- Producer: John Cale

John Cale chronology
Le Bataclan '72 (2004)	Process (2005)	blackAcetate (2005)

Process is the soundtrack album by Welsh multi-instrumentalist and composer John Cale. It was released in August 2005 on French independent label Syntax Records. It was produced, composed and performed by John Cale. It is the original music score for C.S. Leigh's film Process. It was released on CD and three tracks from the album ("Suicide Theme", "Candles" and "Reading Poem") were also released on limited 10" vinyl album.

== Track listing ==
All tracks composed by John Cale.

1. "Theme Intro" − 1:45
2. "Theatre" − 6:51
3. "Post-Sex" − 2:12
4. "Museum" − 4:42
5. "Radiology" − 5:51
6. "Candles" − 3:38
7. "Bedroom" − 0:38
8. "Car Blue" − 1:45
9. "Packing Books" − 4:46
10. "Reading Poem" − 5:33
11. "Burning/Painting" − 5:08
12. "La Defense/Metro" − 5:54
13. "Suicide Theme" − 12:53
14. "Ascension" − 4:53

== Personnel ==
- John Cale − piano
