= If You Were Still Around =

Song by John Cale

from the album Music for a New Society
- Released: October 1982
- Studio: Skyline Studios (New York City)
- Genre: Art rock
- Length: 3:25
- Label: ZE
- Composer: John Cale
- Lyricist: Sam Shepard
- Producer: John Cale

"If You Were Still Around" is a song by the Welsh musician and composer John Cale. It was written by John Cale together with playwright Sam Shepard. It was originally released on Cale's eighth solo studio album Music for a New Society (1982). On 27 October 2014, a year after the death of his The Velvet Underground–bandmate Lou Reed, Cale released a new version of this song. For this version was also released music video directed by Abigail Portner. At the beginning of the video Cale is lying on the floor in a fetal position and after he views the photos of Reed and other deceased people associated with the Velvet Underground and The Factory: Sterling Morrison, Nico, Andy Warhol and Edie Sedgwick.

In 2016, Cale released M:FANS, a re-recording of the Music for a New Society album. M:FANS includes two versions of "If You Were Still Around." One version retains the original title of the song, while the version titled "If You Were Still Around (Choir Reprise)" is the version of the song previously released in 2014.
