= Music for a New Society =

Studio album by John Cale
- Released: September 1982
- Studio: Skyline Studios (New York City)
- Genres: Art rock; experimental rock
- Length: 44:12
- Labels: ZE; Island
- Producer: John Cale

John Cale chronology
| Honi Soit (1981) | Music for a New Society (1982) | Caribbean Sunset (1984) |

Singles from Music for a New Society
- 1. "Close Watch" Released: October 1982

Music for a New Society is the eighth solo studio album by the Welsh rock musician John Cale, released in September 1982 by ZE Records and Island Records. With the suggestion from ZE Records owner Michael Zilkha, Cale performed the album mostly improvised live at Skyline Studios in New York City. The album was a creative shift after several rock-oriented albums, with sparse piano-based performances.

== Background and recording ==
Following on from the commercial success of his previous studio album, Honi Soit (1981), John Cale turned his label, SPY Records, which had released singles from Marie et les Garçons, Lester Bangs, and Cale himself between 1977 and 1980, over to Michael Zilkha. Zilkha absorbed SPY into his label ZE Records. Meanwhile, Cale had dropped working with a band and was touring extensively as a solo performer. Zilkha suggested Cale do an inexpensive solo studio album for the ZE label, with Cale alone on piano in the studio. Cale said, "Before the tapes were rolling I had to have everything mapped out. So I would sit in the studio and work out what the structure of the piece was, then start the tape and off we went." Cale had previously attempted this method as the arranger of Nico's second studio album The Marble Index (1968). The only track that features a full backing band is "Changes Made", with Blue Öyster Cult's Allen Lanier playing lead guitar on it. Cale did not want the track to be included on the album, but the record label insisted.

The original version of the instrumental "Mama's Song" featured a recorded excerpt of a telephone call between Cale and his mother, where she had sung the traditional Welsh folk song "Ar Lan y Môr" to him. When she was taken ill, Cale decided not to include it on the album, a decision he was later to regret. Also at the time, Cale was working with actor and playwright Sam Shepard on his opera The sad lament of Pecos Bill on the eve of killing his wife. Shepard had sent some poems to Cale, which he then in turn set to music. Cale's then-wife Risé co-wrote the track "Damn Life" and provided the voice for "Risé, Sam and Rimsky Korsakov", while Cale's first wife, Betsey Johnson, took the photo on the album's cover. The song "Close Watch" is a re-recording of the version originally found on Cale's sixth solo studio album Helen of Troy (1975) but with a shortened title and was released as a single in both the UK and Europe in October 1982.

Cale described his mood while making Music for a New Society as "grotesque." In an interview with Melody Maker shortly after the album's release, Cale said, "That album was agony. It was like method acting. Madness. Excruciating. I just let myself go. It became a kind of therapy, a personal exorcism. The songs are mostly about regret and misplaced faith." In What's Welsh for Zen? (1999), Cale further commented that "There were some examples where songs ended up so emaciated they weren't songs any more. What I was most interested in was the terror of the moment... It was a bleak record all right, but it wasn't made to make people jump out of windows."

== Release ==
Music for a New Society was first released on vinyl and cassette in September 1982 by ZE and Island.

In 1993, Yellow Moon Records reissued the album on CD for the first time, featuring the previously unreleased bonus track "In the Library of Force". On CD, the 58-second instrumental "Mama's Song", which originally featured as a standalone track on the vinyl LP release, was now incorporated into the running time of "(I Keep A) Close Watch". Additionally, the song "Sanctus" is commonly referred to as "Sanities"; the engineer's handwritten title of "Sanctus" was misread, and the track was first named "Santies" on the LP. The 1993 CD reissue calls it "Sanities". When the album was remastered and reissued in 2016, the song was titled "Sanctus (Sanities)". In January 2016, Music for a New Society was remastered and reissued on vinyl for the first time since its original pressing, and was also reissued as a double CD set including his remake of the album titled M:FANS.

== Critical reception ==
Professional ratings
Review scores
| Source | Rating |
|---|---|
| AllMusic | 4.5/5 stars |
| The Encyclopedia of Popular Music | 4/5 stars |
| NME | 9/10 |
| Pitchfork | 8.5/10 |
| Spin Alternative Record Guide | 8/10 |

Music for a New Society received positive reviews by critics; however, according to Cale, despite the record being his "best-received ever", the record was a commercial failure.

The track "Sanities" ends with the lyrics, "All so that it would be a stronger world/A strong though loving world/To die in." A shortened and slightly misquoted version of these words ("It would be a stronger world, a stronger loving world, to die in") is the epigraph of Alan Moore and Dave Gibbons' comic book limited series Watchmen (1986–1987), appearing in the final panel of the comic's twelfth issue (October 1987). The epigraph is paraphrased by Adrian Veidt ("I envision a stronger, loving world") in the fifth episode of the Watchmen television series (2019).

In a retrospective review, Mark Deming of AllMusic described Music for a New Society as "among the most compelling music of his career; the open spaces of the arrangements are at once ambient and melodically compelling, and the songs have an emotional resonance that communicates on a deeper and more emotional level... Spare, understated, and perhaps a masterpiece." In May 2010, Uncut listed Music for a New Society at number 10 in their list of great "lost" albums, with the review highlighting "Sanities" as the album's centerpiece: "...Over an aloof, majestic keyboard drone and fragmenting percussion, Cale's possessed narration evoked disaster on all fronts, ending with an ominous prediction of terrible things to come, the bleak promise of 'a stronger world, a stronger loving world... to die in.'"

Twenty years after the album's release, Cale said in Uncut magazine about the album's continued popularity: "Maybe what people are seeing there is the pain involved. People like watching suffering. I just have painful memories of it. There's only so much heroism you can milk from a situation like that. I think it's really passionate, really interested in the humanity of people. It is something I am proud of."

== Track listing ==
All tracks are written by John Cale, except where noted.

Side A
| No. | Title | Writer(s) | Length |
|---|---|---|---|
| 1. | "Taking Your Life in Your Hands" | | 4:45 |
| 2. | "Thoughtless Kind" | | 2:45 |
| 3. | "Sanctus" ("Sanities") | | 5:56 |
| 4. | "If You Were Still Around" | Cale; Sam Shepard | 3:24 |
| 5. | "Close Watch" | | 2:11 |
| 6. | "Mama's Song" | | 0:58 |

Side B
| No. | Title | Writer(s) | Length |
|---|---|---|---|
| 7. | "Broken Bird" | | 4:43 |
| 8. | "Chinese Envoy" | | 3:11 |
| 9. | "Changes Made" | | 3:12 |
| 10. | "Damn Life" | John Cale; Risé Cale | 5:11 |
| 11. | "Risé, Sam and Rimsky-Korsakov" | Cale; Shepard | 2:12 |
| Total length: | | | 44:12 |

Original CD release
| No. | Title | Writer(s) | Length |
|---|---|---|---|
| 1. | "Taking Your Life in Your Hands" | | 4:45 |
| 2. | "Thoughtless Kind" | | 2:45 |
| 3. | "Sanities" | | 5:56 |
| 4. | "If You Were Still Around" | Cale; Shepard | 3:24 |
| 5. | "(I Keep A) Close Watch" (includes "Mama's Song") | | 3:06 |
| 6. | "Broken Bird" | | 4:43 |
| 7. | "Chinese Envoy" | | 3:11 |
| 8. | "Changes Made" | | 3:12 |
| 9. | "Damn Life" | John Cale; Risé Cale | 5:11 |
| 10. | "Risé, Sam and Rimsky-Korsakov" | Cale; Shepard | 2:12 |
| 11. | "In the Library of Force" | | 5:56 |

2016 reissue
| No. | Title | Writer(s) | Length |
|---|---|---|---|
| 1. | "Taking Your Life in Your Hands" | | 4:47 |
| 2. | "Thoughtless Kind" | | 2:48 |
| 3. | "Sanctus (Sanities)" | | 6:07 |
| 4. | "If You Were Still Around" | Cale; Shepard | 3:28 |
| 5. | "Close Watch" | | 3:07 |
| 6. | "Broken Bird" | | 4:46 |
| 7. | "Chinese Envoy" | | 3:13 |
| 8. | "Changes Made" | | 3:16 |
| 9. | "Damn Life" | John Cale; Risé Cale | 5:14 |
| 10. | "Risé, Sam and Rimsky Korsakov" | Cale; Shepard | 2:23 |
| 11. | "Library of Force" | | 5:56 |
| 12. | "Chinese Envoy" (Outtake) | | 3:39 |
| 13. | "Thoughtless Kind" (Outtake) | | 2:34 |

== Release history ==
| Country | Date | Label | Format | Catalogue # |
|---|---|---|---|---|
| Europe | September 1982 | ZE/Island | Vinyl LP | ILPS 7019; 204 951 |
| France | 1993 | Fnac | CD | 592288; YM003CD |
| United States | 3 May 1994 | Rhino | CD | R2 71743 |
| Worldwide | 22 January 2016 | Domino/Electric Drone | 2CD; vinyl LP | REWIGCD93; REWIGLP93 |

== Personnel ==
Musicians

- John Cale – vocals; guitars; keyboards
- Allen Lanier – guitar
- David Young – guitar; keyboards
- David Lichtenstein – drums
- John Wonderling – autoharp
- Mike McClintock – backing vocals
- Robert Elk – bagpipes
- Pipe Major Thomas Fitzgibbon – bagpipes
- Chris Spedding – acoustic guitar
- Risé Irushalmi Cale – vocals on "Risé, Sam and Rimsky-Korsakov"

Production and artwork

- John Cale – producer
- David Lichtenstein – engineer
- David Young – assistant engineer
- Rob O'Connor – design
- Betsey Johnson – photography
