= Guts (John Cale album) =

Compilation album by John Cale
- Released: February 1977
- Genre: Rock
- Label: Island
- Producer: John Cale

John Cale chronology
| Helen of Troy (1975) | Guts (1977) | Sabotage/Live (1979) |

Professional ratings
Review scores
| Source | Rating |
|---|---|
| AllMusic | 4/5 stars |
| Christgau's Record Guide | A |
| Trouser Press | favourable |

Guts is a retrospective compilation album by the Welsh rock musician John Cale, released in February 1977 by Island Records. It includes the songs "Leaving It Up to You", which was deleted from Helen of Troy (1975), and the previously unreleased "Mary Lou". It was compiled by Howard Thompson.

On the evolution of his cover art from the "extremely soft focus" of 1973's Paris 1919 to the brasher look of Helen of Troy and Guts, Cale told Slash in 1979 that "it was important at one point to always do something different in every album."

== Critical reception ==
AllMusic favorably described Guts as "a solid reminder of the three albums he cut for Island earlier in the decade—and which predicted the power and promise of punk with a passion that not one of the movement's other putative godfathers had ever truly communicated."

Writing in Creem, Robert Christgau gave the album an "A," remarking that Guts "is how Island makes up for withholding [a] U.S. release of Helen of Troy, and I think we're better off." He noted that "Pablo Picasso" and "Leaving It All Up to You" are "Cale at his mad best" and that "Cale's Island music epitomizes the cold, committed dementia of the best English rock."

Los Angeles Times wrote that Guts was "a fine opportunity to experience Cale's violent, intense, and engrossing music." The critic added that the "tracks chosen cover too narrow a stylistic range, but songs like 'Guts,' 'Fear is a Man's Best Friend,' and a frightening version of 'Heartbreak Hotel' are riveting examples of how Cale makes darkly memorable music from the verge of emotional frenzy."

John Rockwell of The New York Times also authored a positive review, noting that Guts "contains some superb music, well worth the attention of anyone who liked Roxy Music in its glory years—not to speak of those who saw Mr. Cale's New York club dates and concerts this year."

== Track listing ==
Side A

1. "Guts"
2. "Mary Lou"
3. "Helen of Troy"
4. "Pablo Picasso"
5. "Leaving It Up to You"

Side B

1. "Fear Is a Man's Best Friend"
2. "Gun"
3. "Dirty Ass Rock 'n' Roll"
4. "Heartbreak Hotel"

== Personnel ==
- John Cale − vocals, keyboards, guitar, bass, percussion
- Chris Spedding − guitar
- Phil Manzanera − guitar
- Archie Leggatt − bass
- Pat Donaldson − bass
- Trevor Burton − bass
- Timi Donald − drums
- Fred Smith − drums
- Keith Smart − drums
- Phil Collins − drums
- Raymond Duffy − drums
- Tony Carr − percussion
- Andy Mackay − saxophone
- Brian Eno − synthesizer
- John Wood − synthesizer
- Geoff Muldaur − backing vocals
- Barry St. John − backing vocals
- Liza Strike − backing vocals
