= Fear (John Cale album) =

Studio album by John Cale
- Released: 1 October 1974
- Recorded: 1974
- Studio: Sound Techniques (London); Olympic Studios (London)
- Genre: Rock
- Length: 40:48
- Label: Island
- Producer: John Cale

John Cale chronology
June 1, 1974 (1974)	Fear (1974)	Slow Dazzle (1975)

John Cale studio album chronology
Paris 1919 (1973)	Fear (1974)	Slow Dazzle (1975)

Singles from Fear
- 1. "The Man Who Couldn't Afford to Orgy" b/w "Sylvia Said" Released: 1974

Fear is the fourth solo studio album by the Welsh rock musician John Cale, released on 1 October 1974 by Island Records.

== Recording and content ==
Fear is the first of Cale's three studio albums for Island Records, all of which were released in a period of just over a year. During this time Cale was also producing records for other artists, working on albums such as Horses (1975) by Patti Smith, one of the most influential of all proto-punk records.

In addition to his lead vocals on Fear, Cale also played keyboards, guitars, viola, violin and bass, and was joined by Fairport Convention's Richard Thompson, Roxy Music's Brian Eno and Phil Manzanera, and other artists who were signed to Island at the time.

"Gun" features an unusual two-man guitar solo from Manzanera and Eno, with the latter using a synthesizer to process the former's guitar playing in real-time. The promotional album for Fear released by Island Records contained an interview with Cale. He announced an adaption of the William Blake poem "Jerusalem", and cover versions of the songs "Girl from the North Country" by Bob Dylan, "Eight Miles High" by the Byrds and "I Can See for Miles" by the Who.

The cover photography was by Keith Morris.

== Release ==
Fear was released on 1 October 1974. "The Man Who Couldn't Afford to Orgy" b/w "Sylvia Said" was released as a single.

The album was remastered in 1996 as part of the 2CD release The Island Years, containing also both Slow Dazzle (1975) and Helen of Troy (1975). It contained "Sylvia Said (Remix)" as a bonus track. The single version of "Sylvia Said" remained unissued on CD as of 2018.

== Critical reception ==
Professional ratings
Review scores
Source	Rating
AllMusic	4/5 stars
Christgau's Record Guide	A−
Overdose	A
The Rolling Stone Album Guide	4/5 stars
Spin Alternative Record Guide	9/10

Mick Brown of Crawdaddy said Fear was "in many ways a patchwork of [Cale's] past. His motif, as defined on Paris 1919, remains clean, compact, clever melodies, written and produced with a clear understanding of the subtle nuances of mood the simplest of chord structures and breaks can evoke. But the extravagant orchestration which characterized the last solo album has been largely abandoned in favor of a sparser, more barren sound, with just the barest backing essentials augmenting Cale's vocals."

Writing in Let It Rock, Mick Gold said: "Cale has the voice of a chameleon. It's never great singing but his deadpan Welsh-American accent gives it just the right edge. His music has broadened its range whilst also sounding more pared-down. And at least five songs on this album stand equal to the best songs of the 70s. I think it's self-evident from Paris and Fear that Cale's work is more original and more enjoyable than the albums being put out by a dozen better-known artists."

Trouser Press called Fear "a brilliant record full of neat surprises and great, unsettling songs."

== Track listing ==
All tracks are written by John Cale.

Side one
No.	Title	Length
1.	"Fear Is a Man's Best Friend"	3:53
2.	"Buffalo Ballet"	3:29
3.	"Barracuda"	3:48
4.	"Emily"	4:23
5.	"Ship of Fools"	4:38

Side two
No.	Title	Length
6.	"Gun"	8:05
7.	"The Man Who Couldn't Afford to Orgy"	4:35
8.	"You Know More Than I Know"	3:35
9.	"Momamma Scuba"	4:24
Total length:		40:48

The Island Years bonus track
No.	Title	Length
1.	"Sylvia Said" (Remix)	4:09

== Personnel ==
Adapted from the Fear liner notes.

Musicians

- John Cale – lead vocals; bass guitar; guitar; keyboards; viola
- Phil Manzanera – guitar; slide guitar on "Momamma Scuba"
- Fred Smith – drums
- Brian Eno – synthesizer; effects
- Archie Legget – bass guitar
- Michael Desmarais – drums on "Momamma Scuba" and "Fear"
- Richard Thompson – slide guitar on "Momamma Scuba"
- Bryn Haworth – slide guitar on "Momamma Scuba"
- Brian Turrington – bass guitar on "Momamma Scuba"
- Doreen Chanter – backing vocals
- Irene Chanter – backing vocals
- Liza Strike – backing vocals; girl's choir
- Judy Nylon – lead vocals on "The Man Who Couldn't Afford to Orgy"

Production and artwork

- John Cale – producer
- Brian Eno – executive producer
- Phil Manzanera – executive producer
- John Wood – engineer; mixing
- George Peckham – mastering
- Keith Morris – photography
