= Reefer Madness (Sloman book) =

1979 book by Larry Sloman

Reefer Madness: The History of Marijuana in America
- First edition
- Author: Larry Sloman
- Language: English
- Publisher: Bobbs-Merrill
- Publication date: 1979
- Publication place: United States
- Media type: Hardcover
- Pages: 404
- ISBN: 0-672-52423-6
- LC Class: HV5822.M3 S54

Reefer Madness: The History of Marijuana in America is a book by Larry "Ratso" Sloman, originally published in 1979. The book is a history of social cannabis (also known as marijuana) use in the United States. The book was reissued in 1998 with an introduction by William S. Burroughs.

== Reception ==
Writer Abe Peck gave Reefer Madness a mostly negative review, writing, "Sloman knows what he's talking about; the problem is that he presents his material as a multistyled hash of unsifted information. [...] [H]is reporting is so skeletal you can still see the ribs of a book outline poking through his prose."

The Boston Globe's Lee Grove criticized the book for its pro-cannabis bias and selection of interviewees, whom Grove describes as "[Sloman's] boring pothead friends", while also noting, "I would have expected Sloman to interview at least one major rock star smoking in the seventies – he alludes to so many of them in the book – but he doesn't."

Larry King of Democrat and Chronicle referred to the book as an "exercise in futility", criticizing a lack of details and statistics: "Sloman consistently fails to include any body of information that might lend some credibility to his subtitle, with its claim to be a 'history.' The book reeks of haste and sloppiness."

== See also ==
- List of books about cannabis
