= Herr Lehmann =

2001 novel by Sven Regener

Berlin Blues
- Cover of German paperback edition
- Author: Sven Regener
- Original title: Herr Lehmann
- Translator: John Brownjohn (into English)
- Language: German
- Publisher: Goldmann
- Publication date: 2001
- Publication place: Germany
- ISBN: 0-09-944923-4; German ISBN 3-8218-0705-9
- Preceded by: Neue Vahr Süd

Herr Lehmann is a German novel by Sven Regener, published in 2001, adapted for the screen in 2003. It has been translated into English by John Brownjohn under the title Berlin Blues.

The book has sold more than 1 million copies in German and Regener received the Deutscher Filmpreis in gold for the screenplay. The story tells of the life of Frank Lehmann in Berlin in 1989. Regener's prequel Neue Vahr Süd (published in 2004) tells of Frank Lehmann's life in the year 1980, especially his time in the Bundeswehr (German armed forces) while the middle part of the trilogy Der kleine Bruder (the little brother) (published 2008) tells of two days in November 1980, when Frank Lehmann arrives at Berlin and tries to find his older brother Manfred who lives as an artist in Berlin Kreuzberg. After these two days of odyssey Frank is no longer the "little brother".

== Plot ==
Frank Lehmann works as a barkeeper in Kreuzberg, West Berlin, complacent and drinking frequently, with few other ambitions. His 30th birthday is fast approaching, and as a result, he is teasingly called "Herr Lehmann" ("Mr Lehmann") by his friends. The book follows Frank Lehmann's daily life in Kreuzberg and showcases the attitude of a generation of young adults in West Berlin in autumn 1989 in the months leading up to the Fall of the Berlin Wall.

=== Chapters 1–7 ===
The first third of the book recounts the events of a single day. Shortly before dawn on a Sunday morning, Herr Lehmann is walking home from work, drunk, and comes across a dog that is blocking his path. Herr Lehmann is afraid of the dog and is overwhelmed by the situation. Here, like in many other portions of the text, the reader is given direct access to Herr Lehmann's thoughts. The comedy of the situation is derived from the discrepancy between Herr Lehmann's thoughts and actions, but the subjective narrative voice allows the reader to comprehend the rational reasons for the discrepancy. Herr Lehmann solves the problem with the dog by giving it whiskey, whereupon he is found by two policemen who threaten to report Herr Lehmann for animal cruelty. The dog bites one of the policemen, and Herr Lehmann finally finds his way home.

In the morning, Herr Lehmann is woken by a phone call from his mother, who announces that she and his father are coming to visit him in Berlin. Hungover and unexcited about the upcoming visit, Herr Lehmann makes his way to a nearby pub and meets Karl, his best friend. The pub is full of "Sunday breakfasters", who annoy Herr Lehmann. Out of spite, Herr Lehmann orders pork roast for breakfast, which makes the new cook, Katrin, cross. This leads to a philosophical argument between them about "time" and "purpose in life", and Herr Lehmann is immediately smitten with her. He meets her again twice that day, in the afternoon at a pool, and again in the evening during his shift at the bar.

=== Chapters 8–20 ===
Chapters 8 through 20 follow Herr Lehmann's life over the course of the next couple of weeks, focusing on his relationships with Katrin, his parents, and Karl. Karl works in the same bar as Herr Lehmann, but is also an artist who is scheduled to have an opening later that autumn.

The narrative remains narrowly focused on Herr Lehmann and his everyday life, ignoring the external historical and political situation as much as possible. Herr Lehmann attempts to travel to East Berlin and is detained by the customs official for hours. Herr Lehmann is principally bothered by the limitations on his personal freedom and how his day did not go according to plan, rather than any political aspects of the situation. He is fixated only on his environment, friends and his life in his walled-in "island" of West Berlin.

On Herr Lehmann's "island", each of his relationships come to a head. All three threads of the story lead into dead ends: his relationship with Katrin falls apart when they realize they both had entirely different expectations; his parents' visit show his supposed independent, self-actualized life is an empty self-deception; and Karl suffers a nervous breakdown shortly before his art opening, destroying his sculptures. Each of these events destroys part of Herr Lehmann's self-image, and he comes to realize that he needs to escape from his "island".

Throughout the novel, it is implied that Karl has been abusing stimulant drugs, and Herr Lehmann has to take him to the hospital, as Karl is suffering from acute psychological problems. Herr Lehmann has to admit that he is not in a position to help his friend. On top of this, the evening is also Herr Lehmann's 30th birthday. After leaving the hospital, Herr Lehmann sets out to celebrate his birthday alone by bar-hopping through West Berlin and using alcohol to escape, which has been a recurrent theme throughout the book.

=== Conclusion ===
While Herr Lehmann is bar-hopping, the news comes out that the Berlin Wall has fallen. Herr Lehmann participates with a mixture of interest and boredom, watching history happen in front of him. The story ends with the impression that Herr Lehmann's personal life also will see a fresh start. The novel closes with Herr Lehmann's thoughts: "I'm just going to get moving [...]. The rest will unfold by itself."

== Film ==
Leander Haußmann did an adaption with the same name for the screen with the former MTV video jockey Christian Ulmen in the title role. At the 54th German Film Award in Berlin in 2004 the film was awarded 2 Golden Lolas for Detlev Buck (best supporting actor) and for Regener (best screenplay).
