= David Young (guitarist) =

English musician and record producer (1949–2022)

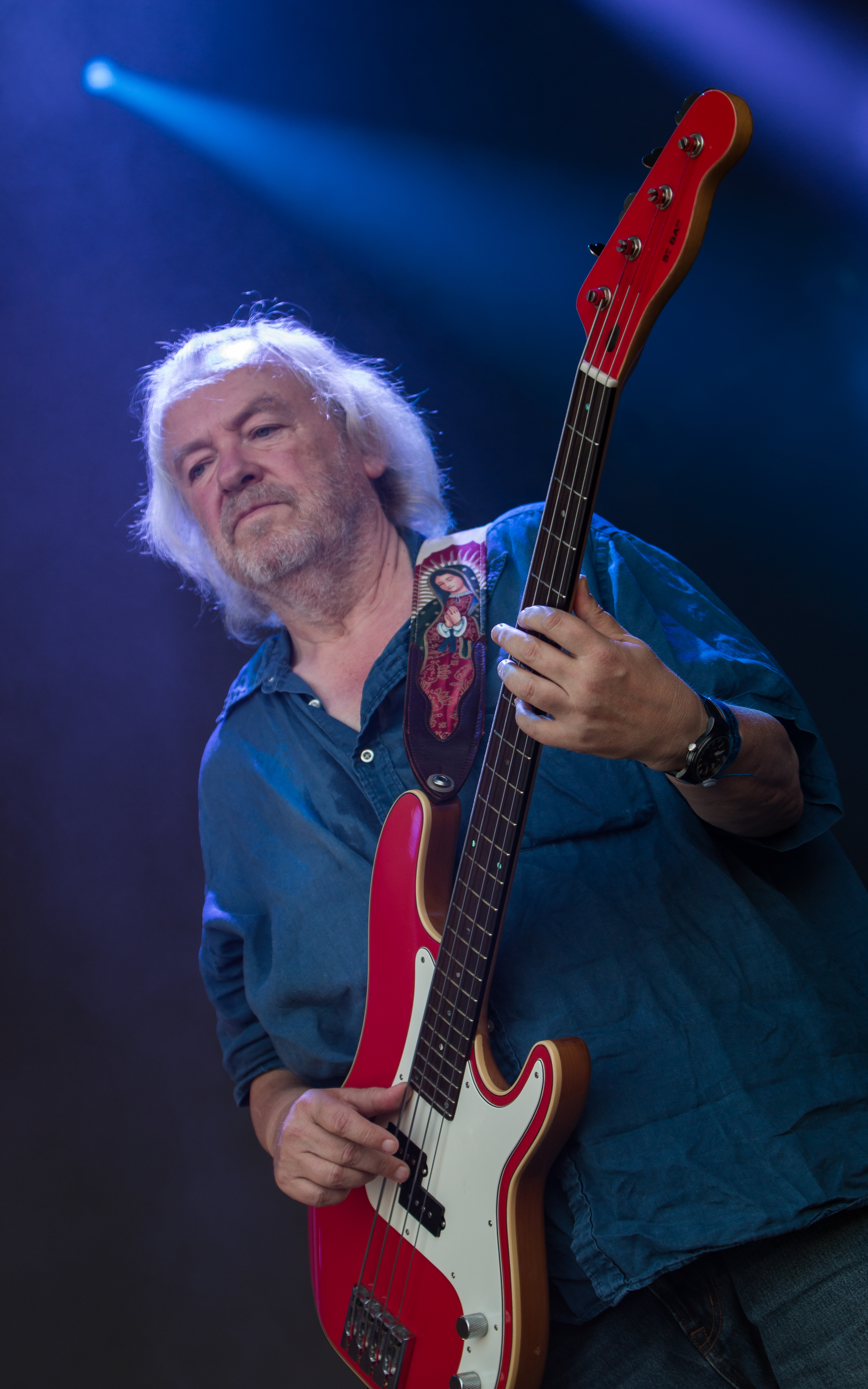
- Young performing with Element of Crime in Wiesbaden, Germany, 2015

Background information
- Born: David Justin Young; 2 May 1949; London, England
- Died: 31 August 2022 (aged 73) England
- Genres: Rock
- Occupations: Musician; record producer; audio engineer
- Instruments: Guitar; bass guitar
- Years active: 1970s–2022
- Formerly of: Element of Crime; John Cale Band

David Justin Young (2 May 1949 – 31 August 2022) was an English musician, record producer and audio engineer best known for his playing with the John Cale Band in the 1980s and collaborating with the German rock band Element of Crime for 35 years.

== Career ==
Young started his career in the 1970s. He was one of the three audio engineers on David Bowie's Diamond Dogs North American Tour in 1974. He also worked with Duke Ellington.

In 1982, he started working with John Cale, initially as an audio engineer (along with David Lichtenstein) on what would become the Music for a New Society studio album. He also plays guitar on some songs and joined his live band as a full member soon after. He then played on two more studio albums, Caribbean Sunset (1984) and Artificial Intelligence (1985), the latter of which he also co-produced, as well as two live albums, Comes Alive (1984) and Live at Rockpalast (recorded 1984, released 2010). He stayed with Cale's band until the end of 1985, in the later period (after Ollie Halsall joined) switching from guitar to bass guitar. Although he left Cale's live band, they continued to work together in the studio. In 1987, Young produced and engineered some Happy Mondays recordings (including "24 Hour Party People" and "Wah Wah (Think Tank)") off their debut studio album, Squirrel and G-Man Twenty Four Hour Party People Plastic Face Carnt Smile (White Out), mainly produced by Cale. In 1990, he played on and engineered Cale's studio album Wrong Way Up and later produced the In Paradisu (1996) studio album by Les Nouvelles Polyphonies Corses with Cale.

In 1987, he engineered the Cale-produced second studio album by the German rock band Element of Crime called Try to be Mensch. He then went on to produce their subsequent albums Freedom, Love & Happiness (1988), The Ballad of Jimmy & Johnny (1989), Crime Pays (1990), Damals hinterm Mond (1991), Weißes Papier (1993), An einem Sonntag im Apri (1994), Die schönen Rosen (1996), Psycho (1999), Romantik (2001), Mittelpunkt der Welt (2005), Immer da wo du bist bin ich nie (2009) and Lieblingsfarben und Tiere (2014). From the beginning of the 1990s he also played with them live as a guitarist and in 2002 he joined them as a regular bassist. He left the band due to ill health in June 2022, just a few months before he died, and was replaced by Markus Runzheimer.

Young died on 31 August 2022 in a hospital in England at the age of 73.
