= Helen of Troy (album) =

Studio album by John Cale
- Released: November 1975
- Studios: Sound Techniques (London, UK)
- Genres: Art rock; proto-punk; experimental rock
- Length: 40:21
- Label: Island
- Producer: Juanma

John Cale chronology
Slow Dazzle (1975)	Helen of Troy (1975)	Guts (1977)

John Cale studio album chronology
Slow Dazzle (1975)	Helen of Troy (2)	Honi Soit (1981)

Helen of Troy is the sixth solo studio album by the Welsh rock musician John Cale, released in November 1975. It was the last of his three studio albums for Island Records.

== Content ==
During the sessions for Helen of Troy, Cale recorded two cover versions, the Ann Ronell standard "Willow Weep for Me" and the Beach Boys' "God Only Knows", both of which went unreleased. Another unused track, "Mary Lou", was released in 1977 on the compilation album Guts.

The album includes a cover of "Pablo Picasso" originally by the Modern Lovers, a song which Cale had produced for the band's eponymous debut studio album. At that time the Modern Lovers' version was still unreleased. Cale re-recorded "I Keep a Close Watch" in 1982 for his eighth solo studio album Music for a New Society.

The cover has a photograph of Cale by Keith Morris. Cale's trousers were given to him by Judy Nylon who had acquired them from fashion designer Vivienne Westwood.

== Release ==
Helen of Troy was released in November 1975. Although his other Island albums were issued in the US (Fear, Slow Dazzle, the collaborative live album June 1, 1974 and the later Guts), Helen of Troy was not. It was only available in America as a UK import. No singles were released from the album.

The album's first pressing contained "Leaving It Up to You" as the ninth track. However, due to its reference to the 1969 murder of Sharon Tate by members of the Manson Family, Island replaced it on subsequent pressings with the song "Coral Moon". "Leaving it Up to You" was later included on Guts, and it was reinstated in its original place on Helen of Troy when the album was repressed in 1978. "Coral Moon" has appeared as a bonus track on CD releases.

The album was remastered in 1996 as part of the two-disc release The Island Years, which includes also Fear (1974) and Slow Dazzle (1975).

The album was re-released on December 6, 2024 by Proper Music. It received another remaster in January 2025.

=== Release controversy ===
Helen of Troy was recorded in a very short time in between Cale's production work and touring to promote his previous album Slow Dazzle, and was released by Island without his approval, in what he considered to be an unfinished state. With the controversy over "Leaving It Up to You" relations between Cale and Island turned sour, and the two parties went their separate ways.

John Cale explained:

It could have been a great album. I came back from finishing Patti Smith's Horses and had three days to finish Helen of Troy before I went on [an] Italian tour. I was spending eighteen hours a day in the studio. When I got back, I found the record company had gone ahead and released what amounted to demo tapes. The trouble was that Island had their own ideas of what that album should sound like. They wanted to include songs I don't particularly like, but it was also an impertinent assumption on my part that I was capable of managing myself. My determination to have Helen of Troy the way I did was not really fair to Island or my management, especially at a time when Island was losing its percentage of the market, which was making everybody very paranoid.

== Critical reception ==
Professional ratings
Review scores
Source	Rating
AllMusic	4.5/5 stars
Trouser Press	generally favourable

In a retrospective review for AllMusic, critic Ned Raggett wrote "Helen of Troy finds Cale at his edgiest, with fascinating results." Writing in Christgau's Record Guide: Rock Albums of the Seventies (1981), Robert Christgau was more critical of the record. He believed that, while "Pablo Picasso" and "Leaving It All Up to You" are "Cale at his mad best", "Mary Lou" and the title track are indicative of how the album is "sodden and stylized" as a whole.

== Track listing ==
All songs written by John Cale, except where indicated.

Side A

1. "My Maria" – 3:48
2. "Helen of Troy" – 4:18
3. "China Sea" – 2:30
4. "Engine" – 2:45
5. "Save Us" – 2:20
6. "Cable Hogue" – 3:30

Side B

7. "I Keep a Close Watch" – 3:27
8. "Pablo Picasso" (Jonathan Richman) – 3:21
9. "Leaving It Up to You" – 4:34
10. "Baby What You Want Me to Do" (Jimmy Reed) – 4:48
11. "Sudden Death" – 4:37

== Personnel ==
Adapted from the Helen of Troy liner notes.

Musicians

- John Cale – vocals; keyboards; guitar
- Chris Spedding – guitar
- Pat Donaldson – bass guitar
- Timi Donald – drums
- Phil Collins – drums
- Brian Eno – synthesizer
- Alan Courtney – spoken word on "Helen of Troy"
- Robert Kirby – string and choir arrangement
- Liza Strike – backing vocals (uncredited)

Production and artwork

- John Cale – producer
- John Wood – executive producer
- Vic Gamm – mixing
- George Peckham – mastering
- Edward Barker – design
- Keith Morris – photography
- Judy Nylon – styling
