= Larry Sloman =

American author (born 1950)

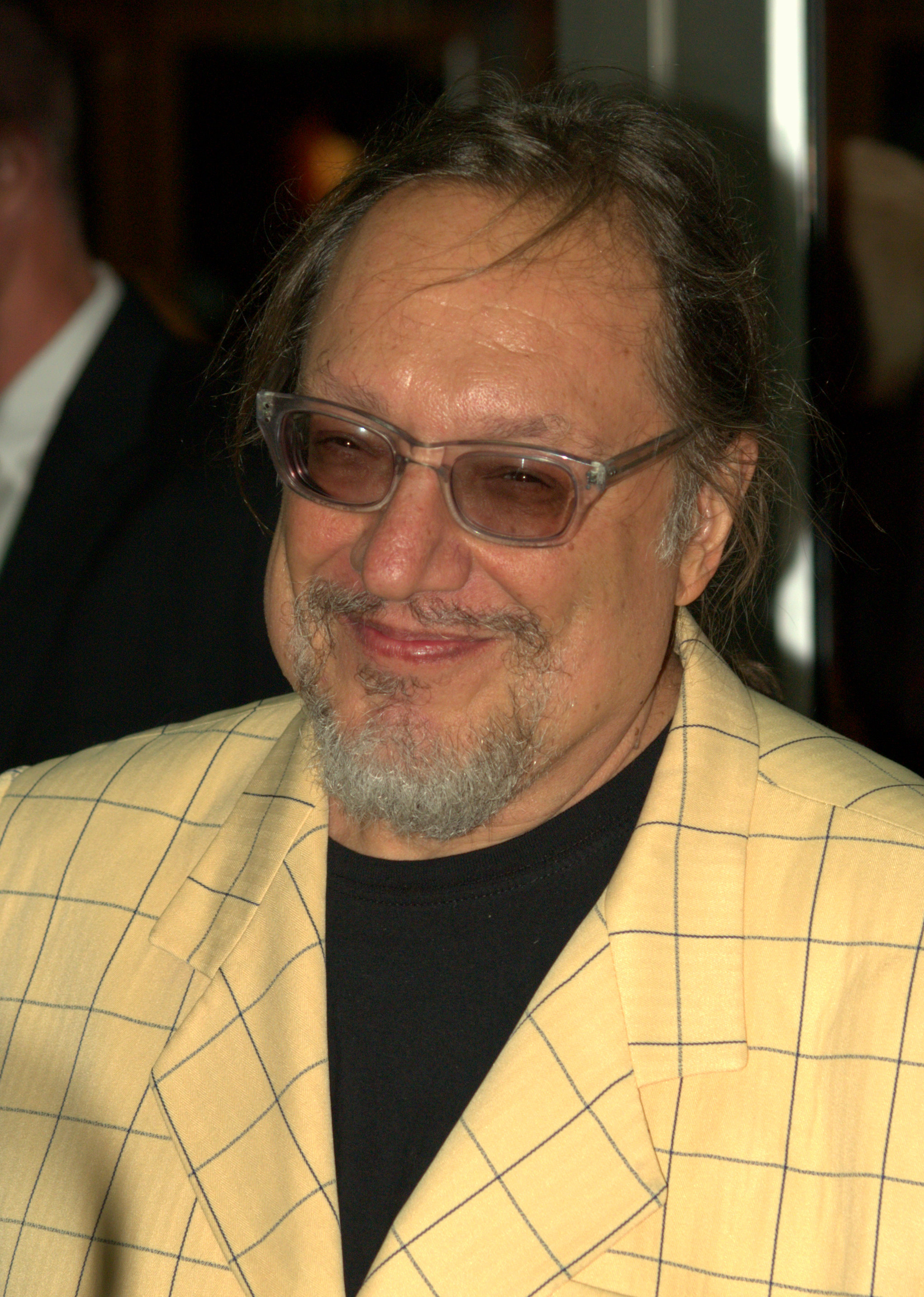
- Sloman at the 2009 Tribeca Film Festival
- Born: July 9, 1950 (age 76)
- Occupation: Writer
- Writing career
- Pen name: Ratso

Signature
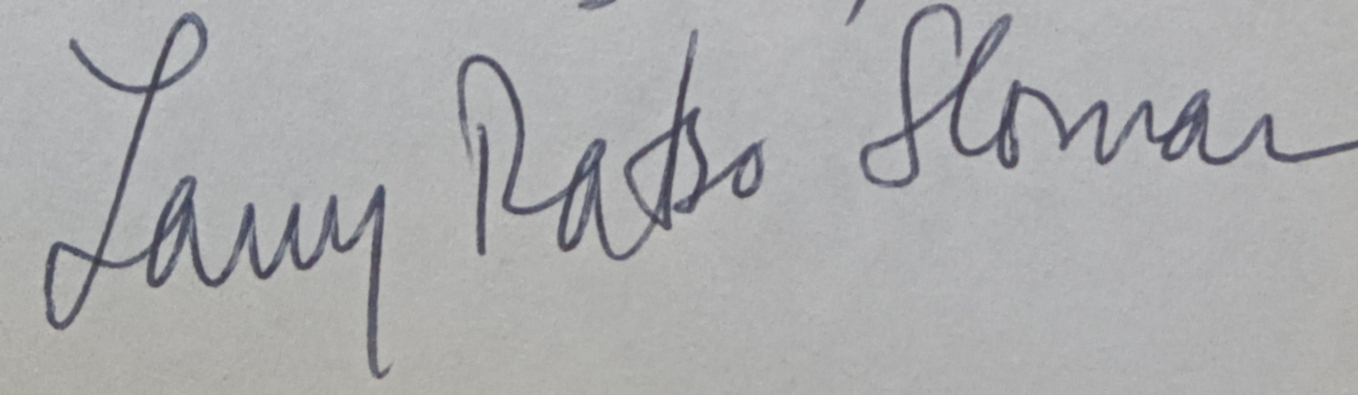

Larry "Ratso" Sloman (born July 9, 1950) is a New York–based author.

== Career ==
Sloman was born into a middle-class Jewish family from Queens. In 1969, he graduated from Queens College, City University of New York, Magna Cum Laude and Phi Beta Kappa, with a B.A. in sociology. He then earned a master's degree in Deviance and Criminology at the University of Wisconsin at Madison. His nickname Ratso came from Joan Baez who said Sloman looked like Dustin Hoffman's character Ratso Rizzo in Midnight Cowboy (1969).

He wrote for Rolling Stone, Crawdaddy, and Creem in the 1970s. He wrote a column, "Ratso's Palazzo", in Heavy Metal in 1985.

In 1984, he co-wrote two songs with Welsh rock musician John Cale for his ninth solo studio album Caribbean Sunset, and that same year he co-wrote the studio track "Ooh La La" with Cale on his otherwise live album John Cale Comes Alive, which was also released as a single. The following year, he co-wrote the entirety of Cale's studio album Artificial Intelligence.

He collaborated with Howard Stern on the radio personality's two best-selling books, Private Parts (1993) and Miss America (1995). He also appears in all of Kinky Friedman's mystery novels as the Dr. Watson to Kinky's Sherlock. Sloman wrote an account of Bob Dylan's 1975 Rolling Thunder Revue tour, On the Road with Bob Dylan. He also penned Reefer Madness (1979), a history of marijuana use in the United States; Thin Ice: A Season in Hell with the New York Rangers, a 1982 on- and off-ice account of the 1979–80 New York Rangers season; and Steal This Dream, an oral biography of political and social activist Abbie Hoffman.

His book The Secret Life of Houdini, written with magic historian William Kalush, presented research that attempted to prove that early 20th-century American magician Harry Houdini was a spy. The authors also raised the possibility that Houdini had been murdered by a cabal of Spiritualists, prompting Houdini's great-nephew to call for an exhumation of the magician's body to test for poisoning.

Sloman's other collaborations include Mysterious Stranger (2002), with the magician David Blaine; Scar Tissue (2004), the autobiography of the Red Hot Chili Peppers lead vocalist Anthony Kiedis, which Sloman ghost-wrote; and Undisputed Truth: My autobiography (2013) and Iron Ambition (2017) with the American boxer Mike Tyson.

Starting in 1985, for a few years Sloman served as executive editor of National Lampoon magazine. He was also editor-in-chief of High Times.

On 5 April 2019, he released a studio album, Stubborn Heart, that includes a duet with Nick Cave, among others. Sloman and George Lois directed the music video for Bob Dylan's song "Jokerman."

In the 2025 film Marty Supreme, Sloman plays Murray Mauser, a shoe shop owner and uncle of Timothée Chalamet's fictional character Marty Mauser.

== Works ==
- Sloman, Larry (December 4, 1975). "Bob Dylan and Friends on the Bus: Like a Rolling Thunder". Rolling Stone.
- Sloman, Larry; Kinky Friedman (introduction) (August 2002) [1978]. On the Road with Bob Dylan. Bantam, Three Rivers Press. ISBN 9780553116410.
- Sloman, Larry (1979). Reefer Madness: The History of Marijuana in America. Bobbs-Merrill. ISBN 978-0-672-52423-3.
- Sloman, Larry (1982). Thin Ice: A Season in Hell with the New York Rangers. William Morrow. ISBN 978-0-688-00628-0.
- Stern, Howard; Larry Sloman (October 1993). Judith Regan (ed.). Private Parts (1st ed.). New York, New York: Simon & Schuster. ISBN 978-0-671-88016-3. OCLC 28968496.
- Stern, Howard; Larry Sloman (November 1995). Judith Regan (ed.). Miss America (1st ed.). ReganBooks. ISBN 978-0-06-039167-6.
- Sloman, Larry; Howard Stern (introduction) (August 1998). Steal This Dream: Abbie Hoffman and the Countercultural Revolution in America. Doubleday. ISBN 978-0-385-41162-2.
- Kiedis, Anthony; Larry Sloman (October 2004). Scar Tissue. Hyperion. ISBN 978-1-4013-0101-9.
- Kalush, William; Larry Sloman (October 2006). The Secret Life of Houdini: The Making of America's First Superhero. Simon & Schuster. ISBN 978-0-7432-7207-0.
- Criss, Peter; Larry Sloman (2013). Makeup to Breakup: My Life In and Out of KISS. Simon & Schuster. ISBN 978-1-4516-2082-5.
- Tyson, Mike; Larry Sloman (November 2013). Undisputed Truth. HarperCollins. p. 592. ISBN 9780399161285.

== Awards and nominations ==
Award	Year	Category	Nominated work	Result	Ref.
Actor Awards	2026	Outstanding Performance by a Cast in a Motion Picture	Marty Supreme	Nominated	
