= Keith Morris (photographer) =

English photographer (1938–2005)

Keith Morris (15 August 1938 – 17 June 2005) was an English rock photographer. Morris was responsible for several iconic images of Marc Bolan. He photographed musical figures including Led Zeppelin, Van der Graaf Generator, Nick Drake, Janis Joplin, Fairport Convention, Richard Thompson, The Albion Band, B. B. King, Jimi Hendrix, John Cale, Fred Astaire and album covers such as Pictures at an Exhibition by ELP.

With the new wave of the late 1970s, Morris also photographed The Damned, Elvis Costello and the Attractions, Nick Lowe, The Kursaal Flyers and Dr. Feelgood.

== Career ==
Morris was born in Wandsworth, London in 1938 and he studied photography at the Guildford School of Art.

He was inaccurately known in the music industry as the only professional to have photographed Nick Drake before his death in 1974. An exhibition of his Drake photographs was exhibited in 2004 at the Redfern's Music Picture Gallery in west London. Morris said: "Although I knew Nick on and off for about four years, I photographed him only three times, on three separate days, each time linked to one of his albums".

In the mid-1970s, Morris developed a passion for scuba diving and, within a decade, he was one of Britain's top divers and became a senior instructor for Technical Divers International. Morris went missing from a dive on a submarine wreck in the English Channel around 17 June 2005.
