= Andrew Heermans =

- Born: September 21, 1953 (age 73); Mineola, New York, U.S.
- Occupations: Musician; audio engineer; mixer; mastering engineer
- Instrument: Bass guitar
- Years active: 1979–present
- Label: Polywog Recording Company

Andrew Heermans (born September 21, 1953) is an American musician, mixer, audio, and mastering engineer. His three brothers and one sister were raised by their parents in Woodstock, New York. He started playing guitar during those years (1960–69) and began performing with bands on a regular basis upon a family move to Lafayette, Colorado, in 1969. After a very brief stint at the University of Colorado, Heermans returned to regular performing in soul and rock bands and began recording sounds and music. With the birth of his son, Heermans and his wife moved to a small house in the country near Hotchkiss, Colorado, where he continued to play, but with country musicians. Upon his return to New York City in 1978, he began playing with various bands including John Cale and recording in studios in Manhattan. His band FUN featuring Sean Doherty, Carlos Alomar, and Aaron Rubin achieved a certain notoriety in New Yowk and other cities around the world. Beside his work with FUN and other musical incarnations, his most recent work are his solo albums and shows, he continues working as a mastering engineer and recording engineer/producer of musical recordings.

== Selected discography ==
as FUN

- PAX (1996)
- CHAOS (1997)
- Andi Christo & The Disciples of FUN (2001)
- Like Fire Ants (2004)
- The Shady Patriot (2018)

as Andrew Heermans

- Come & Gone (2017)
