= Sven Regener =

German musician and writer

- Sven Regener at the Frankfurt Book Fair 2026
- Born: 1 January 1961 (age 65); Bremen, West Germany
- Occupations: Novelist, musician
- Writing career
- Notable work: Berlin Blues

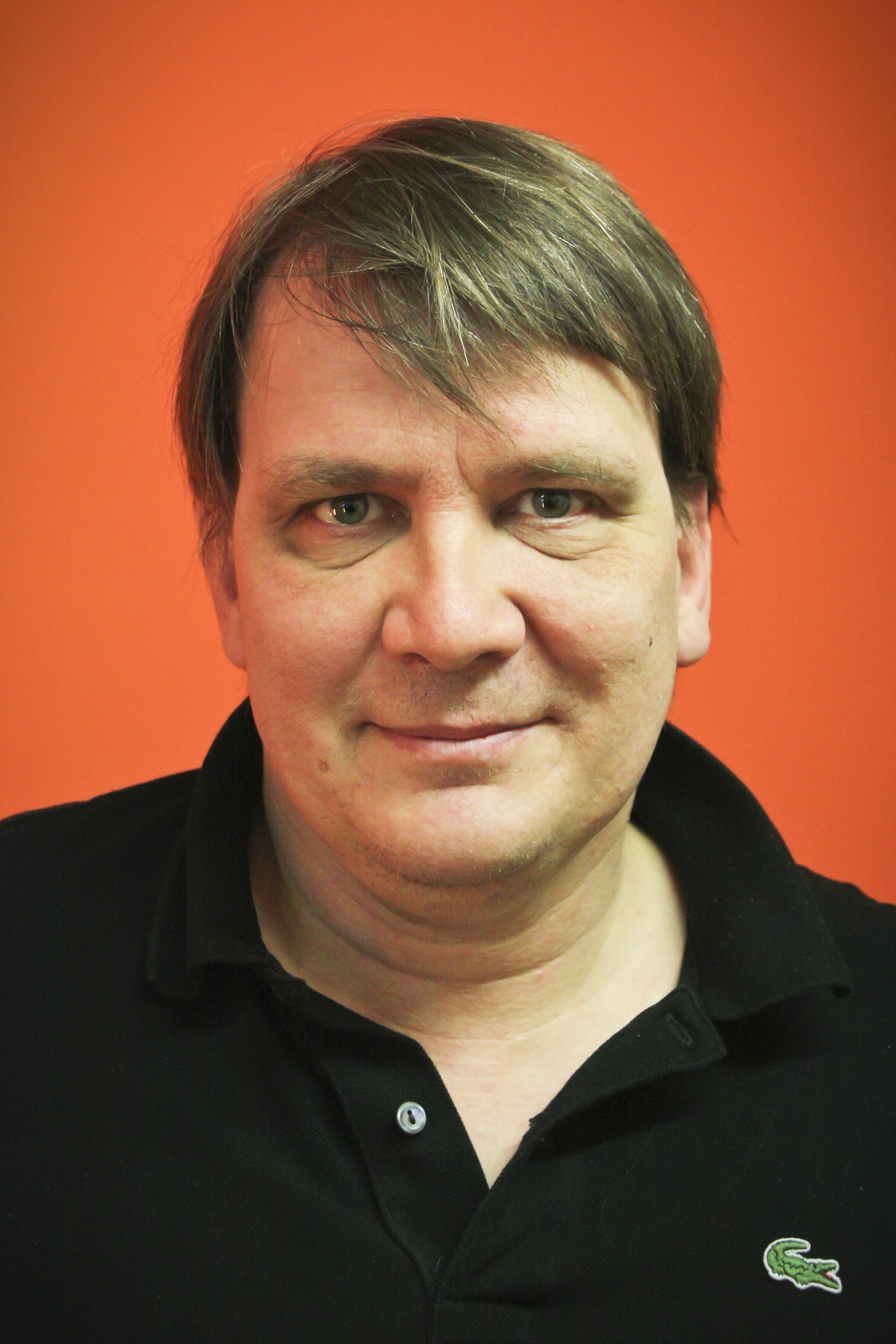
Sven Regener 2011

Sven Regener (born 1 January 1961) is a German musician and writer living in Berlin. In 1982 he recorded his first LP with the band Zatopek and in 1984 he joined Neue Liebe. In 1985 he founded the Berlin band Element of Crime together with Jakob Friderichs. He writes almost all their lyrics as well as playing trumpet.

In 2001 he published his first novel, Berlin Blues (original title Herr Lehmann), which achieved sales of around one million copies. The book takes place in autumn 1989 in Berlin. In 2004, Regener was awarded the Deutscher Filmpreis for the screenplay to the film of the same name (best screenplay that has been turned into a film).

His second novel, Neue Vahr Süd, was released in 2004 and follows the life of Frank Lehmann while serving in the Bundeswehr in 1980 in Bremen. In 2008 this was followed by a third novel, Der kleine Bruder (The Little Brother) which dealt with the time between 1980 and 1989.

== Bands ==
- Zatopek
- Toten Piloten
- Neue Liebe
- Element of Crime

== Works ==
- Herr Lehmann (2001), English translation: Berlin Blues (2003)
- Neue Vahr Süd (2004)
- Angulus Durus (2006), with Germar Grimsen
- Der kleine Bruder (2008)
- Magical Mystery (2013)
- Wiener Straße (2017)
- Glitterschnitter (2021)
- Die Frau mit dem Arm (2023)
- Zwischen Depression und Witzelsucht: Humor in der Literatur (2024)
- Frankie und Freddie (2026)
