= Tommy Durden =

American steel guitarist and songwriter (1919–1999)

- Born: Thomas Russell Durden; December 15, 1919; Morgan County, Georgia, United States
- Died: October 17, 1999 (aged 79); Houghton Lake, Michigan, U.S.
- Occupations: Guitarist; songwriter; commercial dishwasher repairman
- Known for: Co-writing "Heartbreak Hotel"

Thomas Russell Durden (December 15, 1919 – October 17, 1999) was an American steel guitarist and songwriter, who is most notable for co-writing Elvis Presley's 1956 breakthrough hit, "Heartbreak Hotel".

== Biography ==
He was born in Morgan County, Georgia, the son of a sharecropper and the youngest of seven children. The family later moved to Jacksonville, Florida, where he learned slide guitar and later steel guitar. He performed with the Westernaires as steel guitarist, and in the early 1950s, after moving to Gainesville, joined country band Smilin' Jack Herring and his Swingbillys. The band's other members were Herring, Pee Wee Jenkins, and Bob Chisolm.

While playing with the Swingbillys, Durden began writing the lyrics for "Heartbreak Hotel." Durden took the half-written lyrics to his friends and occasional songwriting partners Mae Boren Axton - who worked as a part-time disc jockey and publicist for Colonel Tom Parker's client Hank Snow - and Glenn Reeves. While Reeves thought the idea of the "lonely street" leading to a "heartbreak hotel" was not worthy of a song and turned down the offer of a co-writing credit, Axton composed a tune, and recorded an initial version with Durden. Another account from a radio-station owner has it that Durden had written the song in its entirety months previous and had already been performing it onstage. In any case, the song was recorded as a demo by Reeves who had a better singing voice. Axton had promised to write a song for Elvis Presley and presented Presley with the demo at a 1955 disc jockey convention in Nashville. Presley liked the song, and he and Parker, his manager, agreed that he should record it so long as he was given a co-writing credit, which Axton and Durden accepted. "Heartbreak Hotel" eventually became Presley's first record on RCA Records and his first number one hit.

Although Durden continued to write songs with Axton and Reeves, including "Honey Bop" which was recorded by Wanda Jackson in 1958, none had anything approaching the success of "Heartbreak Hotel". By 1958, he had set up a song poem business in Dayton, Ohio, setting submitted lyrics to music for a fee. He later performed as steel guitarist for Tex Ritter, Johnny Cash and Johnny Tillotson. He moved to live in Houghton Lake, Michigan, and worked as a commercial dishwasher repairman until retiring in the early 1980s. In later years he recorded two albums, Moods, which included a version of "Heartbreak Hotel," and I Believe. He was inducted into the Michigan Country Music Hall of Fame in 1994.

He died in Houghton Lake, Michigan in 1999 at the age of 79.
