= Mae Boren Axton =

American singer-songwriter (1914–1997)

- Born: Mae Boren; September 14, 1914; Bardwell, Texas, U.S.
- Died: April 9, 1997 (aged 82); Hendersonville, Tennessee, U.S.
- Occupations: Music promoter; educator
- Known for: Co-writing "Heartbreak Hotel"
- Spouse(s): John T. Axton (m. 193?; died 1987)
- Children: 2, including Hoyt Axton
- Relatives: Lyle Boren (brother), David Boren (nephew), Dan Boren (grand-nephew)

Mae Boren Axton (born Mae Boren; September 14, 1914 – April 9, 1997) was an American singer-songwriter. She was known in the music industry as the "Queen Mother of Nashville". She co-wrote the Elvis Presley hit single "Heartbreak Hotel" with Tommy Durden. She worked with Mel Tillis, Reba McEntire, Willie Nelson, Eddy Arnold, Tanya Tucker, Johnny Tillotson, and Blake Shelton.

== Personal life ==
Axton was born in Texas to Mark L. and Nannie Boren. The only daughter out of nine children, she was the sister of United States Congressman Lyle Boren. When she was two years old the family moved to Oklahoma. She attended East Central State College and the University of Oklahoma, where she earned a bachelor's degree in journalism. She obtained a public teaching certificate and taught English and journalism at schools throughout Oklahoma.

She married John Thomas Axton, an officer in the US Navy, and they had two sons: musician, film and television actor Hoyt Axton (b. 1938) and John (b. 1940), who became an attorney. The family lived in Comanche, Oklahoma during the children's pre-teen years. In 1949, when John was stationed in Jacksonville, Florida, the family relocated there. During this time Mae taught English at Dupont High School, Paxon High School and Ribault High School in Jacksonville.

Through her brother, Lyle, she is the aunt of Oklahoma State Representative turned Governor of Oklahoma and later United States Senator David Boren, and grand-aunt to David's son, Oklahoma State Representative and later United States Congressman Dan Boren.

== Music career ==
By the early to mid-1950s, Axton had developed a number of connections in the music industry. The best-known of these was music executive, song publisher, and songwriter Fred Rose (famous for his work with Hank Williams). She also became a songwriting partner with Jacksonville musicians Tommy Durden and Glenn Reeves, and worked as a radio announcer and music promoter.

Axton is credited with writing approximately 200 songs. Artists who recorded her early compositions include Perry Como and Ernest Tubb. She assisted in managing the music and acting career of her son Hoyt Axton throughout the 1970s and '80s. In 1983, Axton discovered a young Tiffany Darwish singing country songs at the Palomino Club in Los Angeles. She brought the singer to Nashville, and soon afterwards Tiffany would set a record for the youngest female artist to top the Billboard charts with a debut album. Mae was also instrumental in getting Blake Shelton started in the Nashville music industry in the early 1990s.

=== "Heartbreak Hotel" ===
In her autobiography, Country Singers as I Know 'Em, Axton purported to be the link between Elvis Presley and RCA Victor. She introduced a 19-year-old Presley to Colonel Tom Parker after a performance in Jacksonville. She worked on behalf of Bob Neal to promote Presley and pressured RCA Victor's Nashville division head Stephen H. Sholes to sign Presley. In 1955 Axton co-wrote the Elvis Presley hit-song "Heartbreak Hotel" with Tommy Durden. Durden presented the idea to Axton from a newspaper article he had read in which criminal and painter Alvin Krolik said, "This is the story of a person who walked a lonely street." She suggested there be a Heartbreak Hotel at the end of the man's lonely street. She offered Presley a songwriting credit on the work, thus earning him one third of the royalties, as an enticement to have him record the song; the song became Presley's first #1 record.

== Death and tributes ==
On April 9, 1997, Axton suffered a heart attack and drowned in her hot tub at her home in Hendersonville, Tennessee.

Since 1998, The Academy of Country Music (ACM) has presented the Mae Boren Axton Service Award to "an outstanding country music artist, duo/group or industry leader in recognition of years of dedication and service to the Academy of Country Music." Recipients include Paul Moore, Barry Adelman, Bob Kingsley, Reba McEntire and Keith Urban.

On November 1, 2007, Mae and her son Hoyt Axton were inducted posthumously into the Oklahoma Music Hall of Fame in Muskogee, Oklahoma.
