= Heartbreak Hotel =

1956 single by Elvis Presley

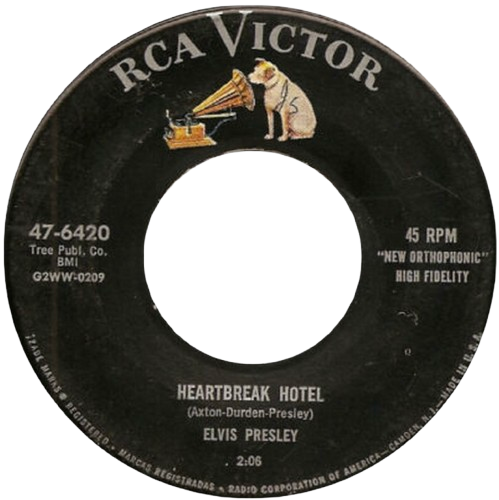
- A-side label of US single

Single by Elvis Presley
- B-side: "I Was the One"
- Released: January 27, 1956
- Recorded: January 10, 1956
- Studio: RCA Victor, Nashville
- Genre: Blues; rock and roll; rockabilly
- Length: 2:08
- Label: RCA Victor
- Songwriters: Mae Boren Axton; Tommy Durden; Elvis Presley
- Producer: Stephen H. Sholes

Elvis Presley singles chronology
"I Forgot to Remember to Forget" (1955)	"Heartbreak Hotel" (1956)	"I Want You, I Need You, I Love You" (1956)

Official audio
- "Heartbreak Hotel" (audio) on YouTube

"Heartbreak Hotel" is a song recorded by the American singer Elvis Presley. It was released as a single on January 27, 1956, Presley's first on his new record label RCA Victor. It was written by Mae Boren Axton and Tommy Durden, with credit being given also to Presley. A newspaper article about the suicide of a lonely man who jumped from a hotel window inspired the song. Axton presented the song to Presley in November 1955 at a country music convention in Nashville. Presley recorded it on January 10, 1956, in a session with his band, the Blue Moon Boys, the guitarist Chet Atkins, and the pianist Floyd Cramer. "Heartbreak Hotel" comprises an eight-bar blues progression, with heavy reverberation throughout the track, to imitate the character of Presley's Sun recordings.

The single topped the Billboard Top 100 for seven weeks, Cashbox's Pop singles chart for six weeks, and the Country and Western chart for seventeen weeks as well as reaching No. 3 on the R&B chart, becoming Presley's first million-seller, and one of the best-selling singles of 1956. "Heartbreak Hotel" achieved unheard of feats as it reached the top 5 of Country and Western, Pop, and Rhythm 'n' Blues charts simultaneously. It was eventually certified double platinum by the Recording Industry Association of America. Presley had first performed "Heartbreak Hotel" during a live show in December 1955 during a tour of the Louisiana Hayride; it gained popularity after his appearance on Stage Show in March 1956. It became a staple of Presley's repertoire in live appearances, last performed by him on May 29, 1977, at the Civic Center in Baltimore.

In 1995, "Heartbreak Hotel" was inducted into the Grammy Hall of Fame, and in 2004 Rolling Stone magazine named it one of the "500 Greatest Songs of All Time". That year it was also included in the Rock and Roll Hall of Fame's "500 Songs that Shaped Rock and Roll". A rock and roll standard, "Heartbreak Hotel" has been covered by several rock and pop acts, including Willie Nelson and Leon Russell, who recorded a duet version that topped the Country charts in 1979.

== Background and writing ==
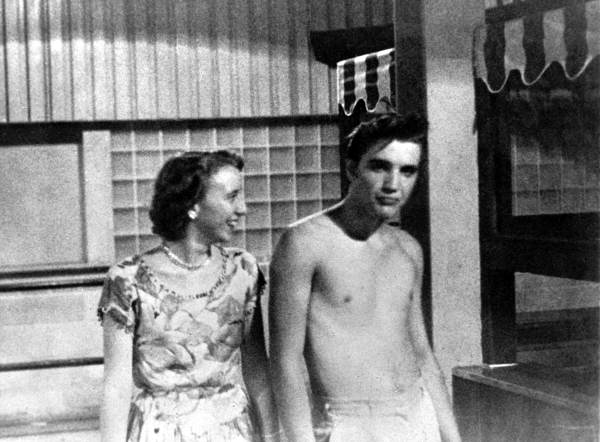
One of the song's writers, Mae Boren Axton, followed Presley's career closely after seeing him stripped to his waist while escaping from a fan riot, during concerts performed in Jacksonville, Florida, May 12–13, 1955

The song was written in 1955, by Mae Boren Axton, a high school teacher with a background in musical promotion, and Tommy Durden, a Jacksonville, Florida-based singer–songwriter. The lyrics were based on a report supposedly in The Miami Herald about a man who had destroyed all his identity papers and jumped to his death from a hotel window, leaving a suicide note with the single line, "I walk a lonely street". Songfacts.com says they were unable to locate the Miami Herald story. They labeled it an urban legend. In 2016, an article in Rolling Stone magazine suggested that the story in reality originated from a report about a painter and criminal, Alvin Krolik, whose marriage had failed and who wrote an unpublished autobiography including the line "This is the story of a person who walked a lonely street." Krolik's story was published in news media, and received further publicity after he was shot and killed in an attempted robbery in El Paso, Texas. On August 25, 1955, the El Paso Times reported Krolik's death under the headline "Story of Person Who Walked Lonely Street". Krolik's death was not a suicide, so it could not have inspired the song to Tommy Durden.

Axton and Durden give different accounts of how the song was written. Durden's account is that he had already written the song and performed it with his band the Swing Billys before he presented it to Axton. Axton's account is that Durden had written only a few lines of the song and asked her to help him finish it. She says that the report of the suicide "stunned" her, and she told Durden, "Everybody in the world has someone who cares. Let's put a Heartbreak Hotel at the end of this lonely street". They were interrupted by the arrival of Glenn Reeves, a local performer who had previously worked with Axton. The duo asked Reeves to help with the song, but after hearing the title he remarked that it was "the silliest thing I've ever heard", and left them to finish it themselves. The song was written within an hour, and Durden recorded it onto Axton's tape recorder. Reeves returned, and after hearing the song he was asked to provide a voice demo for Axton in the style of Elvis Presley. Reeves obliged, but once again turned down the offer of a writing credit for his input.

Axton approached the popular singing duo the Wilburn Brothers, and offered them the chance to record "Heartbreak Hotel". However, Doyle and Teddy Wilburn declined, describing the song as "strange and almost morbid". Axton, however, agreed to a publishing deal with Buddy Killen, a young Nashville bass player working as a song plugger for a new publishing company called Tree Publishing. With a publishing deal in place, Axton arranged through Presley's manager Colonel Tom Parker to present the song to Presley at the annual Country Music Disc Jockey Convention in Nashville, Tennessee, where he was to be named the most promising male country star of 1955. Axton had been hired earlier in the year to publicise the Hank Snow Jamboree concerts at the Gator Bowl Stadium in Jacksonville, Florida, which included Presley in the line up. During one concert Axton observed the reaction of the audience to Presley's performance, in which a crowd of screaming fans chased him back to his dressing room and ripped his clothes off to take as souvenirs. Axton followed Presley's career closely after this incident, and met him at a July 28 concert in Jacksonville, this time interviewing him for the local media. According to author Albert Goldman, Axton made writing Presley's first big hit one of her ambitions.

Rumors had been circulating in the press for several weeks that Presley, who had begun his career at Sun Records, was ready to move to RCA Victor to help launch him nationally. Axton played the demo to him in his room at the Andrew Jackson Hotel on November 10, 1955. Upon hearing the demo, Presley exclaimed "Hot dog, Mae, play that again!", and listened to it ten times, memorizing the song. After signing with RCA on November 21, 1955, Presley accepted Axton's offer of a third of the royalties if he made the song his first single on his new label. Presley performed the song for the first time in Swifton, Arkansas, on December 9, 1955, and declared to the audience that it would be his first hit.

== Recording ==
"Heartbreak Hotel" was the second song Presley recorded at RCA Victor, following "I Got a Woman", during his debut session at 1525 McGavock Street in Nashville on January 10, 1956. Presley arrived at the studio with the song ready to record without seeking RCA's approval, and although producer Steve Sholes was not sure that it would be a success, he recorded "Heartbreak Hotel" believing that Presley knew what he was doing. Recording at RCA Victor was a different experience for Presley and his band, who were used to a more relaxed atmosphere at Sun Studio. Guitar player Scotty Moore later commented, "It was a larger studio than Sun's and more regimented - they called everything by a tape number. We would sit around at Sun, eat hamburgers and then somebody would say, 'Let's try something.'"

Almost immediately Sholes discovered a problem while recording Presley. RCA Victor had always insisted their performers stay still as they sang so the microphone would pick up the vocals; even the slightest tilt of the head would result in missing sound. Sholes had told Presley to stand on a painted X on the floor, telling him "Whatever you do, don't move". During the recording of "I Got a Woman", Sholes noticed that Presley's voice and guitar were not always being picked up by the microphone. Presley explained to Sholes that he had to "jump around to sing it right. It's something that just happens—just a part of the way I sing". Sholes arranged for the whole studio to be re-miked so that Presley's voice and guitar could be picked up from anywhere in the studio, and recording continued.

It’s so full of mystery, and it’s never lost that for me. The echo is just stunning. When the Beatles were recording, we’d often ask George Martin for "the Elvis echo".
– Paul McCartney, 2005

As well as the Blue Moon Boys, his regular backing band of Moore, the bassist Bill Black and the drummer D.J. Fontana, Presley was joined by two established RCA Victor musicians: Chet Atkins (who also helped Sholes produce the session) on guitar and Floyd Cramer on piano. Following a suggestion from Presley, Sholes used a hallway at the studio to get an unusual echo for the single. Sholes was attempting to recapture the Sun Records sound, but he was unaware that Sun founder Sam Phillips had used two tape recorders and a slight time delay to create it on previous Presley recordings. When Phillips first heard "Heartbreak Hotel", he remarked that it was a "morbid mess". Most others at RCA agreed, declaring "Heartbreak Hotel" a terrible choice of song, especially after hearing that the finished recording sounded nothing like Presley's Sun recordings. Internal memos from the time show that every one of RCA's executive corps disliked it so much that one of them insisted "We certainly can't release that one".

In an interview, Durden conceded that he did not recognize his song after Presley had made the changes to it in the studio, including the tempo, phrasing, lyrics, and overall sound. In subsequent recordings, these major modifications to the existing material became a normal procedure for Presley who took over the role of producer, although Sholes was still credited. Phillips said Sholes "was not a producer. Steve was just at every session."

== Release and reception ==
1956 sheet music, Tree Publishing.

"Heartbreak Hotel" was released as a single on January 27, 1956, with B-side "I Was the One", a song that was also recorded during Presley's RCA Victor debut sessions. Billboard magazine praised it as "a strong blues item wrapped up in his usual powerful style and a great beat". However, "Heartbreak Hotel" was less-than-warmly received by the British music press. The New Musical Express wrote that, "If you appreciate good singing, I don't suppose you'll manage to hear this disc all through." BBC, which held a monopoly on broadcasting in Britain at the time, didn't consider it fit for general entertainment and placed it on its "restricted play" list.

Presley made his national television debut on January 28, appearing on CBS' Stage Show, starring Tommy and Jimmy Dorsey. As Stage Show's ratings had been slipping, producer Jack Philbin agreed to have Presley on because he was relatively cheap at $1,250 (about $14,116 in 2023); after looking at a photograph of the singer, Philbin exclaimed, "He's a guitar-playing Marlon Brando!" Despite the single having been released only a day before to coincide with Presley's national television debut, the Dorsey brothers did not allow Presley to perform it on their show because it didn't work well in rehearsals. For his second appearance, on February 4, Presley was again aware that he could not perform "Heartbreak Hotel". However, at his third appearance on Stage Show a week later, Sholes pressured CBS to give consent. Subsequently, Presley and his band performed "Heartbreak Hotel" with borrowed instruments (their own were being driven to Florida in preparation for a tour) with the backing of the Dorsey Brothers' orchestra.

On February 22, the song entered the Billboard pop chart at number 68, and the Country and Western chart at number nine. Within two months, "Heartbreak Hotel" reached number one on both charts. It also made top five on the R&B chart, the first Presley single to chart there. This resulted in "Heartbreak Hotel" becoming only the second single in history to reach all three Billboard charts, after Carl Perkins' "Blue Suede Shoes". The song spent a total of twenty-seven weeks in the top 100. By April, "Heartbreak Hotel" became a million-seller, earning Presley his first RIAA-certified gold record, and going on to be the biggest-selling single of 1956. "Heartbreak Hotel/I Was the One" was certified Platinum on March 27, 1992, and 2× Platinum on July 15, 1999, by the RIAA.

The song also became Presley's first charting single in the United Kingdom. It made its debut on the UK Singles Chart in May 1956; it peaked at number two the next month and stayed on the charts for 22 weeks. In November 2022, it was certified silver by the British Phonographic Industry (BPI) for sales and streams exceeding 200,000 units.

== Personnel ==
- Elvis Presley – lead vocals, acoustic guitar
- Scotty Moore – electric guitar
- Chet Atkins – acoustic guitar
- Bill Black – double bass
- D. J. Fontana – drums
- Marvin Hughes – piano
- Steve Sholes – producer, A&R
- Bob Farris – engineer

== Legacy ==
Presley performed the song during most of his live shows between 1956 and 1977, and for the last time on May 29, 1977, at the Civic Center in Baltimore, Maryland. The song has been released on almost every Presley compilation album since 1956, and alternative takes have surfaced on several compilation albums. "Heartbreak Hotel" was awarded by the Broadcast Music Incorporated in its Country Music Awards. It was re-released in 1971 for the UK market, where it charted at number 10. In 1979, following Presley's death, author Robert Matthew-Walker wrote: "'Heartbreak Hotel' became one of the legendary rock performances. For many people it is Elvis Presley, and it continues to excite and fascinate listeners. 'Heartbreak Hotel' is a classic performance, yet when it is analyzed it appears so simple that one cannot recall a time when one did not know it." In 1995, the song was inducted into the Grammy Hall of Fame, and was re-released in 1996 to coincide with the 40th anniversary of its recording.

In a 1975 interview, John Lennon recalled his friend Don Beatty's introducing him to Presley's music. Lennon said that his family rarely had the radio on, unlike other members of the Beatles who grew up under its influence. Beatty showed Lennon a picture of Presley that appeared along with the charts on the New Musical Express, and Lennon later heard "Heartbreak Hotel" on Radio Luxembourg. Lennon has said:

When I first heard "Heartbreak Hotel", I could hardly make out what was being said. It was just the experience of hearing it and having my hair stand on end. We'd never heard American voices singing like that. They always sang like Sinatra or enunciate very well. Suddenly, there's this hillbilly hiccuping on tape echo and all this bluesy stuff going on. And we didn't know what Elvis was singing about ... It took us a long time to work what was going on. To us, it just sounded as a noise that was great

George Harrison described "Heartbreak Hotel" as a "rock n roll epiphany" when in 1956, at age 13, he overheard it while riding his bike at a neighbor's house. Some have said that "Heartbreak Hotel" turned that well-mannered schoolboy into a guitar-crazed truant who would audition for John Lennon's Quarrymen the following year.

The Rolling Stones' guitarist Keith Richards wrote in his 2010 autobiography Life that "Heartbreak Hotel" had a huge effect on him. Beyond Presley's singing itself, it was the total effect of his sound and his silence that so totally affected Richards:

Then, "Since my baby left me"—it was just the sound ... That was the first rock and roll I heard. It was a totally different way of delivering a song, a totally different sound, stripped down, no bullshit, no violins and ladies' choruses and schmaltz, totally different. It was bare right to the roots that you had a feeling were there but hadn't yet heard. I've got to take my hat off to Elvis. The silence is your canvas, that's your frame, that's what you work on; don't try and deafen it out. That's what "Heartbreak Hotel" did to me. It was the first time I'd heard something so stark.

Led Zeppelin's lead singer Robert Plant stated that the song "changed his life". He recalled hearing it for the first time when he was 8 years old:

It was so animal, so sexual, the first musical arousal I ever had. You could see a twitch in everybody my age. All we knew about the guy was that he was cool, handsome and looked wild.

Critic Robert Cantwell wrote in his unpublished memoir Twigs of Folly:

The opening strains of "Heartbreak Hotel", which catapulted Presley's regional popularity into national hysteria, opened a fissure in the massive mile-thick wall of post-war regimentation, standardization, bureaucratization, and commercialization in American society and let come rushing through the rift a cataract from the immense waters of sheer, human pain and frustration that have been building up for ten decades behind it.

The song was mentioned in the chorus of Patty Loveless's 1988 single "Blue Side of Town" from her album Honky Tonk Angel.

President Bill Clinton performed the song on tenor saxophone during his appearance on The Arsenio Hall Show on June 3, 1992. In 2004, it was ranked number 45 on Rolling Stone's list of "The 500 Greatest Songs of All Time", the Rock and Roll Hall of Fame included it in its unranked list 500 Songs that Shaped Rock and Roll and in 2005, Uncut magazine ranked the first performance of "Heartbreak Hotel" in 1956 by Presley as the second greatest and most important cultural event of the rock and roll era. Paul McCartney, who participated in Uncut's poll stated, "It's the way [Presley] sings it as if he is singing from the depths of hell. His phrasing, use of echo, it's all so beautiful. Musically, it's perfect."

Heartbreak Hotel, a film based on a mythical incident involving the kidnapping of Presley, was released theatrically in 1988. It starred David Keith as Elvis Presley and was directed by Chris Columbus. In 1999, Elvis Presley Enterprises purchased a Wilson World Hotel branch and after several renovations, opened it and named the hotel after the song, located across the street from Presley's home, Graceland, in Memphis, Tennessee.

In the CBS miniseries Elvis, a two-part, four hour television movie that explores Elvis Presley's life, a scene depicts Presley (played by Jonathan Rhys Meyers) wanting to record "Heartbreak Hotel" when he first arrives at RCA. The song is later used when he is performing at the Dorsey Brothers Stage Show, with Meyers lip-synching.

In 2015, "Heartbreak Hotel" was named as the #2 song of the rock era in the book The Top 500 Songs of the Rock Era: 1955–2015.

In his solo song "Piledriver Waltz", written for the EP Submarine, Alex Turner of the Arctic Monkeys, references going for breakfast at "The Heartbreak Hotel."

== Early cover types ==
Radio humorist Stan Freberg parodied "Heartbreak Hotel" immediately after its release, because the vocals on the original record featured a heavy use of reverb. In the cover, the lead singer repeatedly asks for "more echo on [his] voice." When Presley recorded "Hound Dog" a few months later, he had taken over the role of producer, using what he learned at Sun Records (although Sholes was still credited) and decided not to use echo.

Connie Francis recorded the song for her 1959 album Rock 'n' Roll Million Sellers; this album also features "Don't Be Cruel". Country singer Johnny Cash parodied the song in 1959 on the television show Town Hall Party, imitating Presley's characteristic crib and hip movements. Before the performance Cash explained that it was "an impersonation of a rock and roll singer impersonating Elvis, is what this really is".

Beatles historian Mark Lewisohn noted that, at first as the Quarrymen then later as the Beatles, the group performed "Heartbreak Hotel" live from 1957 until 1961 (in Liverpool then later in Hamburg and elsewhere). It is unclear whether the lead vocal was by John Lennon or Paul McCartney or both. A recorded version has not been forthcoming. However, McCartney (using Bill Black's upright bass) did a version for a documentary Elvis – Viva Las Vegas, which also appears on DVD.

== Later renditions ==
Part of the original personnel of the 1956 recording released their own versions, Chet Atkins recorded it for the 1963 album The Guitar Genius, and also, Presley's lead guitarist Scotty Moore recorded the song for his 1964 album The Guitar that Changed the World. Willie Nelson and Leon Russell had a number one cover version in 1979 on the country charts, it was Russell's only number one hit on the charts.

Paul McCartney later also made another cover of the song in Chaos and Creation at Abbey Road, performing it with Bill Black's bass. Others who have covered the song include Ann-Margret, who would later co-star with Presley in the 1964 motion picture Viva Las Vegas, The Cadets, Delaney Bramlett, Justin Timberlake, Cher, Roger Miller, Bob Dylan, Bruce Springsteen, John Cale, Merle Haggard, Tom Jones, Dax Riggs, Roger McGuinn, Suzi Quatro, Van Halen, Jimi Hendrix, Neil Diamond, Lynyrd Skynyrd, Guns N' Roses, Tones on Tail, and Queen + Adam Lambert. In Canada, a version by The Scoundrelz reached #60 in 1966, and another by Frijid Pink reached #38 in 1971.

In the 1992 film Honeymoon in Vegas, Billy Joel made a version of "Heartbreak Hotel" and "All Shook Up", while the same year in True Romance, actor Val Kilmer performed an a cappella version. Nicole Kidman and Hugh Jackman covered the song in a medley with Prince's "Kiss", for the 2006 Warner Bros. film Happy Feet. The song was also featured in Alvin and the Chipmunks' 1990 television special Rockin' Through the Decades, as part of the fifties medley and its soundtrack and again for the 2007 video game Alvin and the Chipmunks.

== Charts ==
=== Elvis Presley ===
Year	Chart	Peak position
1956	US Billboard Top 100 US Country and Western US Rhythm & Blues Records	1 1 5
1956	UK Singles Chart	2
1971	UK Singles Chart	10
1996	UK Singles Chart	45

=== Willie Nelson and Leon Russell ===
Year	Chart	Peak position
1979	Hot Country Songs	1

== Certifications ==
Region	Certification	Certified units/sales
United Kingdom (BPI)	Silver	200,000^{‡}
United States (RIAA)	2× Platinum	2,000,000^{^}
^{^} Shipments figures based on certification alone.^{‡} Sales+streaming figures based on certification alone.

== See also ==
- List of number-one singles of 1956 (U.S.)
- Billboard Year-End
- List of number-one country singles of 1979 (U.S.)
