= Walking on Locusts =

Studio album by John Cale
- Released: 24 September 1996
- Studio: Sorcerer Sound (New York City)
- Length: 50:18
- Label: Hannibal
- Producer: John Cale

John Cale chronology
N'Oublie Pas Que Tu Vas Mourir (1995)	Walking on Locusts (1996)	Eat/Kiss: Music for the Films by Andy Warhol (1997)

Professional ratings
Review scores
Source	Rating
AllMusic	3/5 stars
The Guardian	3/5 stars
Chicago Tribune	3/3 stars

Walking on Locusts is the thirteenth solo studio album by the Welsh rock musician John Cale, released on 24 September 1996 by Hannibal Records. Cale worked with several guest musicians including David Byrne, Moe Tucker, Dave Soldier with the Soldier String Quartet, B. J. Cole and Erik Sanko. It was recorded at Sorcerer Sound in New York City. Cale claimed the album evolved from touring with New York City's Soldier String Quartet. "Some Friends" was about his former Velvet Underground colleague, Sterling Morrison, who died unexpectedly the previous year.

== Track listing ==
All tracks are written by John Cale, except where noted.

No.	Title	Writer(s)	Length
1.	"Dancing Undercover"		4:25
2.	"Set Me Free"		4:11
3.	"So What"		4:11
4.	"Crazy Egypt"	Cale; David Byrne	3:28
5.	"So Much for Love"		5:01
6.	"Tell Me Why"		5:25
7.	"Indistinct Notion of Cool"		2:44
8.	"Secret Corrida"		6:02
9.	"Circus"		4:03
10.	"Gatorville & Points East"		3:00
11.	"Some Friends"		4:06
12.	"Entre Nous"		3:42
Total length:			50:18

== Personnel ==
Musicians

- John Cale − acoustic guitar, keyboards, vocals
- David Byrne − guitar on "Crazy Egypt"
- Maureen Tucker − drums on "Dancing Undercover" and "Set Me Free"
- Erik Sanko − bass guitar
- Dawn Buckholz − cello
- B. J. Cole − pedal steel guitar
- Mark Deffenbaugh − vocals, harmonica on "Set Me Free", "Crazy Egypt" and "Circus"
- Ibrahim Hakhmoun − drums, metal castanets
- Hassan Hakmoun − Moroccan drums
- Daisy Lignelli, Eden Cale, Joanne O'Brien, Napua Davoy, Susan Didericksen, Tiyé Giraud − backing vocals
- Martha Mooke − viola
- Ben Neill − "mutantrumpet"
- Ben Perowsky − drums
- Todd Reynolds − violin
- E.J. Rodriguez − conga, percussion
- Dave Soldier − violin, string arrangements
- David Tronzo − guitar
- The Lafayette Inspirational Ensemble − choir
- The Soldier String Quartet − strings
- Oliver Williams − choral arrangements
- Jack Wall, John Cale − vocal arrangements

Production and artwork

- John Cale − producer
- Jack Wall − engineer
- Stephen Wolstenholme − design
- Richard Burbridge − cover photography
