= Mulatta Records =

Independent record label

Mulatta Records, which was renamed EEG Records in 2020, is a record label founded in 2000 by Nigerian record producer and DJ Ayo Osinibi and American composer and performer Dave Soldier.

It specializes in music created by unusual means, including the Thai Elephant Orchestra, and various projects by children, including 6- to 9-year-olds who improvise avant-garde jazz in The Tangerine Awkestra, a traditional flute orchestra of school children in Conakry, Guinea, in West Africa, compositions by Mayan Indian children in the highlands of San Mateo Ixtatan, Guatemala, and 5- to 10-year-olds in East Harlem who compose and play rap music in Da Hiphop Raskalz.

Other recordings include work by the Russian conceptual artists Komar and Melamid, music written according to a poll of American music taste, resulting in the statistically Most Wanted and Unwanted Songs, two CDs of operas by writer Kurt Vonnegut with music by Dave Soldier, Mandeng Eletrik, a collaboration between Wofa, tribal musicians from a village in Guinea that lacks electricity and running water, with American R&B musicians including Bernie Worrell and Will Calhoun, albums of toy piano music by the cartoon rabbit Twink, an improvising string orchestra by Jason Hwang and contemporary flamenco by Pedro Cortes, the Delta punk band The Kropotkins, country/jazz by the Texas songwriter Vince Bell, and contemporary classical and jazz music by Robert Dick (flutist), John Clark (musician), and David First.

== See also ==
- List of record labels
