= List of people from Carbondale, Illinois =

The following list includes notable people who were born or have lived in Carbondale, Illinois. For a similar list organized alphabetically by last name, see the category page People from Carbondale, Illinois.

== Arts and culture ==
Name	Image	Birth	Death	Known for	Association	Reference
Agnes Ayres		Apr 4, 1898	Dec 25, 1940	Actor (The Sheik)	Born in Carbondale	
Shawn Colvin		Jan 10, 1956		Grammy Award-winning singer and musician	Grew up in Carbondale	
Darva Conger		Sep 21, 1965		Winner of Who Wants to Marry a Multi-Millionaire? (2000)	Born in Carbondale	
Ben Falcone		Aug 25, 1973		Actor (What to Expect When You're Expecting and Enough Said)	Born in Carbondale	
R. Buckminster Fuller		Jul 12, 1895	Jul 1, 1983	Architect and futurist; built the geodesic domes found around Carbondale	Taught at Southern Illinois University Carbondale	
John Gardner		Jul 21, 1933	Sep 14, 1982	Novelist and teacher (Grendel)	Taught at Southern Illinois University Carbondale	
Paul Gilbert		Nov 6, 1966		Guitarist (Racer X, Mr. Big)	Born in Carbondale	
Rodney Jones		1950		Poet and nominee for the Pulitzer Prize	Professor of English at Southern Illinois University at Carbondale	
Laurie Metcalf		Jun 16, 1955		Actress (Roseanne, 2017 Tony Award winner)	Born in Carbondale	
Dave Soldier		Nov 6, 1956		Composer and founder of the Thai Elephant Orchestra	Born in Carbondale	
Frankie Trumbauer		May 30, 1901	Jun 11, 1956	Saxophonist; contemporary of Bix Beiderbecke	Born in Carbondale	

== Crime ==
Name	Image	Birth	Death	Known for	Association	Reference
Timothy Krajcir		Nov 28, 1944		Serial killer; murdered two Carbondale women		

== Military ==
Name	Image	Birth	Death	Known for	Association	Reference
Oscar Koch		Jan 10, 1897	May 16, 1970	US Army officer; served as Intelligence officer (G-2) for Third United States Army during World War II	Lived in Carbondale	
John Alexander Logan Jr.		Jul 24, 1865	Nov 11, 1899	US Army officer; posthumously awarded the Medal of Honor for actions during the Philippine–American War	Born in Carbondale	

== Politics ==
Name	Image	Birth	Death	Known for	Association	Reference
Laura Liu		Jul 19, 1966	Apr 17, 2016	Illinois Appellate Court judge	Born in Carbondale	
John Ratcliffe		Oct 20, 1965		6th director of National Intelligence	Graduated from high school in Carbondale	
Sheila Simon		Mar 13, 1961		46th lieutenant governor of Illinois	Lives in Carbondale	

== Sports ==
Name	Image	Birth	Death	Known for	Association	Reference
Sola Abolaji		Mar 27, 1985		Professional soccer player	Born in Carbondale	
Ron Acks		Oct 3, 1944	Nov 21, 2023	Linebacker for the Atlanta Falcons, New England Patriots and Green Bay Packers		
Stephen Bardo		Apr 5, 1968		Shooting guard at University of Illinois; ESPN college basketball analyst		
Jim Caldwell		Jan 16, 1955		Head coach of the Detroit Lions, Indianapolis Colts	Wide receiver coach at Southern Illinois University	
Chris Carr		Mar 12, 1974		Shooting guard for six different NBA teams	Attended Southern Illinois University	
Justin Dentmon		Sep 5, 1985		Professional basketball player, 2010 top scorer in the Israel Basketball Premier League	Born in Carbondale, went to Carbondale Elementary schools and Carbondale Community High School	
Troy Hudson		Mar 13, 1976		Point guard for the Minnesota Timberwolves and Golden State Warriors	Born in Carbondale	
Brandon Jacobs		Jul 6, 1982		Running back for the New York Giants and San Francisco 49ers	Played football at Southern Illinois University	
Jerry Kill		Aug 24, 1961		Head football coach for the University of Minnesota and Southern Illinois University		
Bart Scott		Aug 18, 1980		Linebacker for the New York Jets	Played football for Southern Illinois University	
Derek Shelton		Jul 30, 1970		Manager for the Minnesota Twins	Born in Carbondale	
Wan Kuzain bin Wan Kamal		Sep 14, 1998		Soccer midfielder for St. Louis City SC 2	Born in Carbondale, went to Carbondale Elementary schools and Carbondale Community High School	
Steve Waterbury		Apr 6, 1952	May 19, 2017	Pitcher for the St. Louis Cardinals	Born in Carbondale	
Shawn Watson		Sep 21, 1959		Quarterbacks coach for the Louisville Cardinals football team	Born in Carbondale	
