= The People's Choice Music =

1997 avant-garde novelty EP

EP by Komar & Melamid and Dave Soldier
- Released: 1997
- Studios: Big House; ACME
- Genres: "Unwanted": Experimental; opera; polka; experimental hip hop; progressive rock; Western; children's music; "Wanted": Soft rock; adult contemporary
- Length: 27:08
- Labels: Mulatta; Needlejuice
- Producer: Jane Bausman

Komar & Melamid chronology
The People's Choice Music (1997)	Naked Revolution (2018)

Dave Soldier chronology
The Kropotkins (1996)	The People's Choice Music (1997)	Thai Elephant Orchestra (2000)

The People's Choice Music is an EP by the Russian artists Komar and Melamid and the American scientist and composer Dave Soldier, released in 1997. It comprises two songs, "The Most Wanted Song" and "The Most Unwanted Song". The former, a pop duet, was written to incorporate lyrical and musical elements that were received favorably by most respondents to an opinion poll. "The Most Unwanted Song", meanwhile, features lyrical and musical elements that the same respondents most disliked. Accordingly, the track includes bagpipes, cowboy music, an opera singer rapping, and a children's choir that urged listeners to "do all [their] shopping at Walmart!"

The People's Choice Music was released on CD in 1997, sold through the Dia Art Foundation bookstore and later through Soldier's Mulatta Records. Although deliberately designed to be as unpleasant as possible, "The Most Unwanted Song" became the more popular of the two songs on the album. The album has been praised both for its comedic value and as a social statement criticizing the influence of market research, focus groups, and opinion polling on contemporary society.

In 2019, The People's Choice Music was remastered and reissued on vinyl, CD, and cassette by Needlejuice Records.

== Background ==
Beginning in 1994, Russian-American graphic artists Vitaly Komar and Alexander Melamid created a series of "most wanted" and "least wanted" paintings ("Выбор народа"), based on visual aspects found to be most "wanted" and "unwanted" by the public according to professional opinion polls. These paintings were published in the book Painting by Numbers: Komar and Melamid's Scientific Guide to Art in 1997.

When asked by an art gallery owner to make a CD for him, Komar and Melamid approached American neuroscientist and musician David Sulzer (known in his musical career as Dave Soldier), with whom they were working on the opera Naked Revolution for The Kitchen in Manhattan. Soldier suggested adapting the concept of The People's Choice painting series to music, to be titled The People's Choice Music. This project again used the opinions of the public, as measured by polls, to determine which elements of the medium were "most" or "least wanted". The polls were written by Soldier and taken via the Dia Art Foundation in the spring of 1996.

The online survey of approximately 500 Dia visitors and participators revealed that the themes, instruments and other musical and lyrical aspects that people least wanted to hear included cowboy music, bagpipes, accordions, opera, rapping, children's voices, tubas, drum machines, and advertising jingles. The artists then incorporated all of these elements into "The Most Unwanted Song", which lasts almost twenty-two minutes as recorded.

Soldier composed "The Most Unwanted Song" and its companion "The Most Wanted Song" with lyricist Nina Mankin. They debuted the songs at a 1997 performance in New York with soprano Dina Emerson, a large ensemble conducted by Norman Yamada, and a children's choir; Soldier played banjo, while Komar and Melamid jointly played a bass drum.

"The Most Unwanted Song" and "The Most Wanted Song" were performed live for the first time since 1997 at a concert to mark the fifteenth anniversary of the Manhattan arts venue (Le) Poisson Rouge in June 2023, alongside other works by Soldier.

== Lyrics and music ==
=== "The Most Unwanted Song" ===
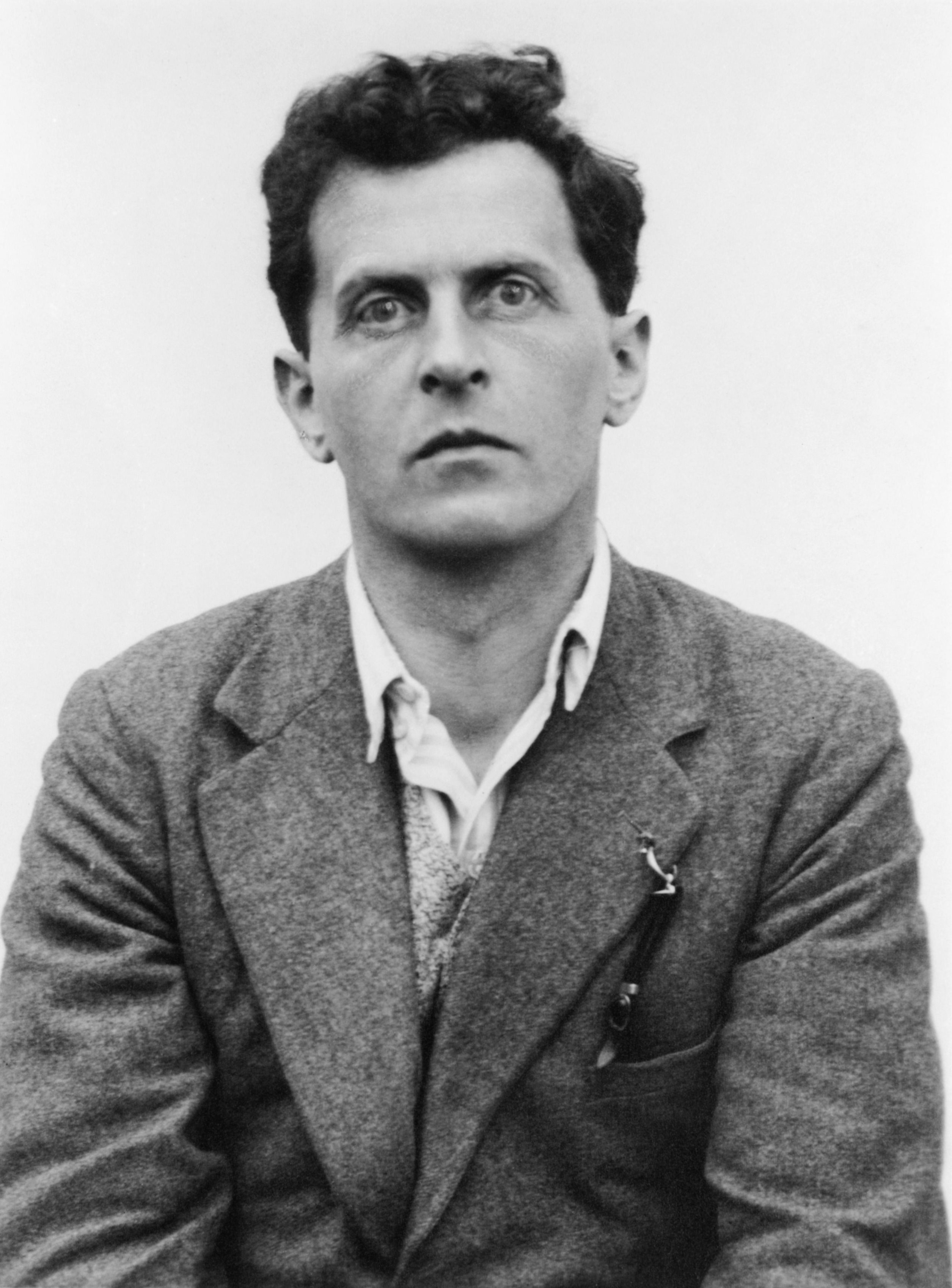
Austrian-British philosopher Ludwig Wittgenstein (pictured in 1929) is referenced in both "The Most Wanted Song" and "The Most Unwanted Song".

According to the survey, the most unwanted music is "over 25 minutes long, veers wildly between loud and quiet sections, between fast and slow tempos, and features timbres of extremely high and low pitch, with each dichotomy presented in abrupt transition". The poll determined that the least wanted ensemble would be large, featuring accordion, bagpipes, banjo, flute, tuba, harp, pipe organ and synthesizer. The least desirable singers would be an operatic soprano and children's choir, singing atonal melodies and rapping. The most unwanted genres were commercial jingles, political slogans, and elevator music. The most unwanted lyrical subjects were cowboys and holidays, while the most unpleasant listening circumstances were involuntary exposure to commercials or elevator music.

"The Most Unwanted Song" is slightly under twenty-two minutes long. Lead singer Dina Emerson raps lyrics about the American frontier in an operatic voice. The narrator of the song is a cowboy who kills wild animals with a knife, lassos cows, and rides through the wilderness "wild and free". The cowboy rests by reading philosopher Ludwig Wittgenstein's 1921 work Tractatus Logico-Philosophicus and pondering his philosophy of language. After singing a verse about Wittgenstein in German, he returns home to make love to Miss Kitty, shoots a suspicious stranger, and fights "Injuns" in order to build a grocery store on their land that will sell American cheese. Emerson's verses are repeatedly interrupted by a children's choir that describes various holidays and urges listeners to call their relatives and shop at Walmart, and by several sections of dissonant free improvisation designated in the score as "slams". Towards the end of the song, Mankin shouts various political terms and slogans into a megaphone over harp-driven "elevator music", followed by a unison "folk song" refrain. According to Soldier, at the time of writing there were fewer than 200 people in the world who could be expected to like "The Most Unwanted Song".

=== "The Most Wanted Song" ===
According to Soldier, the survey confirmed that "today’s popular music indeed provides an accurate estimate of the wishes of the vox populi". Based on the responses, the most desired ensemble contains between three and ten instruments, the most popular of which were guitar, piano, saxophone, bass guitar, drums, violin, cello, and synthesizer (the only instrument that was both wanted and unwanted, though drums are present in both too). The most wanted singer was a low-pitched rock or R&B singer of either gender. The most popular lyrical subject was love, and the music was preferably listened to at home. The only lyrical topic that appeared in both the most wanted and unwanted categories was “intellectual stimulation”; for this reason, Wittgenstein is referenced in both songs. Songs deviating from moderate tempo and pitch were viewed very negatively.

"The Most Wanted Song" has two singers, Ronnie Gent and Ada Dyer; while writing the lyrics, Mankin imagined Whitney Houston as the female singer and Bruce Springsteen as the male singer. According to Stewart Mason and Sarah Vowell, "The Most Wanted Song" is reminiscent of songs by Houston, Mariah Carey, and Celine Dion that were popular at the time. Vernon Reid of Living Colour plays electric guitar on the song, including a solo. "The Most Wanted Song" tells a simple and emotional story with a clear rhyme scheme about a woman who meets a lonely traveler and falls in love with him. At the end, guitar and saxophone solos are heard, after which Dyer and Gent sing several choruses in unison. The last chorus is played half a step higher. According to Soldier, 72 ± 12% of listeners would like the song "unavoidably and uncontrollably".

== Reception ==
Stewart Mason of AllMusic described The People's Choice Music as "a hilarious parody of the concept of 'art for the people' and a pointed critique of how thoroughly market research and polling influences daily life". Mason considered The People's Choice Music "even more conceptually brilliant" than Komar & Melamid's paintings, and felt that "The Most Wanted Song" could have been a hit, though he considered "The Most Unwanted Song" to be superior.

Mankin was not surprised that "The Most Unwanted Song" was the more popular of the two songs. Michael Colton of The Washington Post called "The Most Wanted Song" clichéd and boring, which he interpreted as reflecting Mankin's attitude towards mainstream music; on the other hand, he regarded "The Most Unwanted Song" as "anything but boring" and "hilarious in its atrociousness". Sarah Vowell of Salon pondered whether the music audience is divided into those who focus on what they hear and those who do not. According to Vowell, "The Most Wanted Song" is not significantly different from the radio hits of the time, causing her attention to falter. Vowell considered the song's undisturbing nature a weakness rather a strength, whereas she called "The Most Unwanted Song" "a real crackup". According to Vowell, Komar and Melamid pondered questions important to both art and society: "What would art look like if it were to please the greatest number of people? Or conversely: What kind of culture is produced by a society that lives and governs itself by opinion polls?"

Eliot van Buskirk of Wired described "The Most Unwanted Song" as "a scientific attempt to create the most annoying song ever", but ironically deemed "The Most Wanted Song" "horrible" and "a way rougher listen" than "The Most Unwanted Song". Jordie Yow of The Tyee described "The Most Wanted Song" as "bland, boring, and completely terrible" and "The Most Unwanted Song" as "so bad it's good", explaining that "it takes all the qualities that make songs stand out and combines them together."

== Track listing ==
All lyrics are written by Nina Mankin; all music is composed by Dave Soldier.

No.	Title	Length
1.	"The Most Wanted Song"	5:09
2.	"The Most Unwanted Song"	21:59

== Personnel ==
Credits adapted from the liner notes of The People's Choice Music.

=== "The Most Wanted Song" ===
- Ada Dyer – female vocal
- Ronnie Gent – male vocal
- Vernon Reid – guitar
- Andy Snitzer – saxophone
- Lisa Haney – cello
- Dave Soldier – keyboards, violin, drums
- Rory Young – additional drums
- Komar & Melamid – bass drum

=== "The Most Unwanted Song" ===
- Dina Emerson – soprano
- Nina Mankin – speaking vocal
- Emma Ensign, Kate Polsky, Max Polsky – children
- Elissa Kleeman – piccolo, flute
- Wade Schuman – harmonica
- David Watson – bagpipe
- Yuri Lemeshev – accordion
- Margerie Fitts – harp
- Mary Bopp – organ
- Dave Soldier – banjo
- David Grego – tuba
- Christine Bard – percussion
- Komar & Melamid – bass drum
- Norman Yamada – conductor

Technical

- Charles Simonyi – executive producer
- Jane Bausman – producer
- Rory Young – recording
