= Soldier String Quartet =

American string quartet

The Soldier String Quartet was a string quartet, founded in 1984 by composer and violinist Dave Soldier, that specialized in performing a fusion of classical and popular music. The quartet proved a training ground for many subsequent experimental classical groups and performers, including violinists Regina Carter and Todd Reynolds, and performed at venues ranging from the classic punk rock club CBGBs to Carnegie Hall and the Lincoln Center.

From 1984 to 2004, in addition to a large repertoire of original compositions and transcriptions of blues, jazz and hip-hop by Soldier, the group premiered over 100 compositions including major works by Teo Macero, Leroy Jenkins, Phill Niblock, Zeena Parkins, Fred Frith, Jonas Hellborg, Elliott Sharp, Alvin Curran, and Ivan Wyschnegradsky.

They also performed and recorded with many rock, pop, and jazz acts including Guided by Voices, Van Dyke Parks, Jesse Harris, Butch Morris, Tony Williams, Lambchop, Bob Neuwirth, Bill Laswell, Ric Ocasek, Amina Claudine Myers, Plastic People of the Universe, Lee Ranaldo, Joanne Brackeen, Myra Melford, Sussan Deyhim, and Lenny Pickett. From 1992 to 1998 the Soldier String Quartet were the touring and recording group with John Cale and occasional other members of the Velvet Underground often supplemented with steel guitarist B.J. Cole. The arrangements for the Cale group, written by Soldier, include his metal violin solos on "Heartbreak Hotel" and "Fragments of a Rainy Season".

The quartet helped introduce transcription and arrangements of previously unnoted music to the chamber music repertoire, including a CD of arrangements of Jimi Hendrix pieces led by flutist Robert Dick, and album of jazz standards also with Robert Dick, and an album of Delta and Chicago blues.

== Performers ==
- violins: Dave Soldier, Laura Seaton, Regina Carter, Marlene Rice, Lisa Terry, Rob Thomas, Mark Feldman, Sam Bardfeld
- viola: Ron Lawrence, Martha Mooke, Judith Insell, Drew Tretick
- cello: Dawn Avery, Mary Wooten
- bass: Ratzo Harris, Richard Bona, Mark Dresser, Kermit Driscoll, Jerome Harris
- percussion: Michael Suchorsky, Kevin Norton, Valarie Naranjo, Steve Arguelles, Ben Perowsky, Jim Black, Jonathan Kane
- vocalists: Tiye’ Giraud, Jason White, Jimmy Justice, Shelley Hirsch, Amina Claudine Myers, Bobby Radcliffe

== Discography ==
- Sequence Girls, Soldier String Quartet (1988, Rift Records)
- Sojourner Truth, Soldier String Quartet (1991, Mulatta)
- She's Lightning When She Smiles, Soldier String Quartet (1966 NewTone Records)
- Jazz Standards on Mars, Soldier String Quartet with Robert Dick (1997, Enja)
- Inspect for Damaged Gods, Soldier String Quartet (2004, Mulatta)
- Dave Soldier "In Four Color: music for string quartet", performed by the Soldier String Quartet and the PUBLIQuartet (2015, Mulatta)
- Bob Neuwirth, John Cale Last Day on Earth (1994, MCA)
- Elliott Sharp "Tessalation Row" (1987, SST)
- Elliott Sharp "Larynx" Elliott Sharp & Carbon (1987, SST)
- Elliott Sharp "Hammer, Anvil, Stirrup (1989, SST )
- Elliott Sharp "Twistmap (1991, EarRational)
- Elliott Sharp "Cryptoid Fragments" (1993, Extreme Records)
- Elliott Sharp "Xeno-Codex" (1996, Tzadik)
- Elliott Sharp "Rheo/Umbra" (1998, Zoar)
- Elliott Sharp "String Quartets" 1986-1996 (2003, Tzadik)
- Guided by Voices Do the Collapse (1999, TVT)
- Guided by Voices Hold on Hope (2000, EP, TVT)
- Guided by Voices Isolation Drills (2001, TVT)
- Jesse Harris While the Music Lasts, (2004, Virgin)
- John Cale Walking on Locusts, (1996, Rykodisc)
- John Cale Eat/Kiss: Music for the Films by Andy Warhol, (1997, Rykodisc)
- John Cale Fragments of a Rainy Season, (1992/2016, Rykodisc)
- Jonas Hellborg & Tony Williams The Word, (1992, Island)
- Leroy Jenkins Themes & Improvisations on the Blues, (1994, CRI)
- Nicolas Collins A Dark & Stormy Night, (1992, Trace Elements)
- Phill Niblock Early Winter, (1994, XI)
- Robert Dick Third Stone from the Sun, (1993, New World)
