= David Sulzer =

American neuroscientist and musician

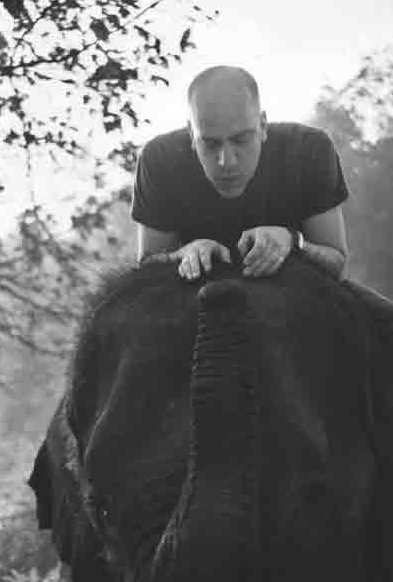
- Sulzer with Jojo of the Thai Elephant Orchestra
- Born: November 6, 1956 (age 69)
- Other name: Dave Soldier
- Education: Michigan State University; University of Florida; Columbia University
- Known for: neurotransmission, Parkinson's disease, Huntington's disease, drug dependence, schizophrenia
- Awards: NARSAD, McKnight Foundation, NIH
- Scientific career
- Fields: Neuroscience
- Workplaces: Columbia University
- Doctoral advisor: Eric Holtzman
- Musical career
- Origin: Carbondale, Illinois, U.S.
- Genres: Experimental music; worldbeat; classical music; alternative rock
- Occupations: Musician, composer
- Instruments: Violin; keyboards; guitar; banjo; electronics
- Years active: 1988–present
- Labels: Mulatta; Newport Classic
- Website: www.mulatta.org; www.davesoldier.com

David Sulzer (born November 6, 1956) is an American neuroscientist and musician. He is a professor at Columbia University Medical Center in the departments of psychiatry, neurology, and pharmacology. Sulzer's laboratory investigates the interaction between the synapses of the cerebral cortex and the basal ganglia, including the dopamine system, in habit formation, planning, decision making, and diseases of the system. His lab has developed the first means to optically measure neurotransmission, and has introduced new hypotheses of neurodegeneration in Parkinson's disease, and changes in synapses that produce autism and habit learning.

Under the stage name Dave Soldier, he is known as a composer and musician in a variety of genres including avant-garde, classical, and jazz. The intersection between these careers was detailed in a 2023 New Yorker profile.

== Scientific contributions ==
=== Studies on synapses ===
Sulzer works on basal ganglia and dopamine neurons, brain cells of central importance in translating will to action. His team have introduced new methods to study synapses, including the first means to measure the fundamental "quantal" unit of neurotransmitter release from central synapses. They reported the first direct recordings of quantal neurotransmitter release from brain synapses using an electrochemistry technique known as amperometry, based on the method of Mark Wightman, a chemist at the University of North Carolina, to measure release of adrenaline from adrenal chromaffin cells. They showed that the quantal event at dopamine synapses consisted of the release of about 3,000 dopamine molecules in about 100 nanoseconds. They further showed that the quantal events could "flicker" due to extremely rapid opening and closing of the a synaptic vesicle fusion pore (at rates as high as 4,000 times a second) with the plasma membrane. This approach also demonstrated that the "size" of the quanta could be altered in numerous ways, for example by the drug L-DOPA, a drug so used to treat Parkinson's disease.

Sulzer's lab, together with that of Dalibor Sames, a chemist at Columbia University, introduced "fluorescent false neurotransmitters", compounds that accumulated like genuine neurotransmitters into neurons and synaptic vesicles. This is used to observe neurotransmitter release and reuptake from individual synapses in video. Sulzer, along with his mentor Stephen Rayport, showed that the neurotransmitter glutamate is released from dopamine neurons, an important exception to the Dale's principle that a neuron releases the same transmitter from each of its synapses.

=== Addictive drugs ===
By introducing the "weak base hypothesis" of amphetamine action, for measuring amphetamine's effects on the quantal size of dopamine release, intracellular patch electrochemistry to measure dopamine levels in the cytosol, and providing real-time measurement of dopamine release by reverse transport, Sulzer's lab showed how amphetamine and methamphetamine release dopamine and other neurotransmitters and exert their synaptic and clinical effects. They showed how methamphetamine neurotoxicity occurs due to dopamine-derived oxidative stress in the cytosol followed by induction of autophagy, and with Nigel Bamford of the University of Washington, how these drugs activate long-term changes in the cortical synapses that project to the striatum. They call these "chronic postsynaptic depression" and "paradoxical presynaptic potentiation", which may explain drug dependence and addiction.

Sulzer explains in an interview on NOVA that his interest in understanding mechanisms of addiction stem from crashing a talk by William Burroughs at Naropa Institute in 1980, where Burroughs claimed that new synthetic opiates would be so powerful that users would become addicts with a single dose. In an interview in Nature Medicine on his lab's discovery of the mechanism by which nicotine filters synaptic noise and can focus attention to tasks, he recalls his father's early death due to smoking, saying "if some idiot or drug company is going to twist things around, the only thing that would come out of [this research] that I'd be horrified by is if people used it to advocate smoking. I think it would be a real travesty if that happened."

=== Neurological and psychiatric disease ===
Sulzer and his lab also studied nerve impulses in Parkinson's and Huntington's diseases, schizophrenia, drug addiction, and autism. They helped to establish the role of autophagy by lysosomes in neuronal disease. They showed the role of neuromelanin, the pigment of the substantia nigra, in methamphetamine neurotoxicity, and Huntington's disease. With Ana Maria Cuervo of Albert Einstein College of Medicine they showed that a cause of Parkinson's disease could be due to an interference with a chaperone-mediated autophagy caused by the protein alpha-synuclein. His work indicates that a lack of normal pruning of synapses could underlie the development of autism, and that in turn may also my due to inhibited neuronal autophagy in patients, due to overactivation of the mTOR pathway during childhood and adolescence.

In 2017, his lab introduced the role of autoimmune response in Parkinson's disease patients, which answers a century-old mystery on the role of immune system activation in that disorder.

The Sulzer lab has published over 250 papers on this research. For his work, Sulzer has received awards from the McKnight Foundation, the National Institute on Drug Abuse (NIDA), and NARSAD. He ran the Basic Neuroscience NIH / NIDA (T32) training program for postdoctoral research in basic neuroscience at Columbia. He received a Ph.D. in biology from Columbia University in 1988. He founded the Gordon Conference on Parkinson's Disease, the Dopamine Society (with Louis-Eric Trudeau) and the journal Nature Parkinson's Disease (with Ray Chaudhuri).

=== Awards and honors ===
2020 - Youdim / Finberg Award, Hebrew University, Jerusalem, Israel

2020 - Raymond D. Adams Lecture, Harvard University, Mass General Hospital, Boston, Massachusetts, USA

2019 - Distinguished Lecture in Medicinal Chemistry, University of Minnesota, USA

2017 - Presidential Lecture, Society of Neuroimmune Pharmacology

2013 - Helmsley Award for Scientific Research

2012 - Keynote Lecture in Cellular Neuroscience, Yale University, New Haven, Connecticut, USA

2008 - McKnight Award in Neuroscience for Technical Innovation

1996 - James T. Shannon Award, National Institute on Drug Abuse, National Institutes of Health, USA

=== Art and Science projects ===
Sulzer wrote a book on scientific principles that underlie music and sound "Music Math and Mind" [Columbia University Press], 2021), and teaches a related course at Columbia University on the physics and neuroscience of music and sound.

He co-ran the original science cafe, "Entertaining Science" from 2012 to 2019, with its founder (2002), chemist and writer Roald Hoffmann in Greenwich Village at the Cornelia Street Cafe .

With Brad Garton, he developed the "Brainwave Music Project", which allows users to create music from neural activity and enable teaching on brain function.

== Music ==
Sulzer uses the alias, Dave Soldier, for his alternate career in music.

=== Music by animals ===
Many of Soldier's works are collaborative, such as with the Thai Elephant Orchestra which he co-founded with conservationist Richard Lair, based on the observation that elephants are said to enjoy listening to music. This ensemble consists of up to 14 elephants at the Thai Elephant Conservation Center near Lampang, and is listed by Guinness as the world's largest animal orchestra, with a combined weight of approximately 23 tonnes (50,706 lb). He built giant musical instruments on which he trained the elephants to improvise: they eventually played on 22 instruments. The orchestra has released three CDs and play an abbreviated concert daily at the Conservation Center.

He also created specially designed instruments for music played by zebra finches and bonobos, the latter in collaborations with physicist Gordon Shaw, who researched classical music's effect on the brain and introduced the Mozart effect.

=== Music by children ===
Soldier has made multiple recordings in which he coached child composers in different cultures. He and flutist Katie Down coached free improvisation with The Tangerine Awkestra featuring 2-10 year old Brooklyn schoolchildren. Da HipHop Raskalz featured rap and dub tracks performed (including the instrumental tracks) by 5-10 year old East Harlem children, who had no previous experience playing instruments. Sulzer and the santur player Alan Kushan produced Yol K'u with Mayan Indian children from the Seeds of Knowledge School in the high mountains of San Mateo Ixtatan, Guatemala, a collaboration using giant marimbas. He produced two CDs by Les Enfants des Tyabala, with the jazz musician Sylvian Leroux who coached children in Conakry, Guinea to form an ensemble and create works with the traditional Fula flute, which Leroux has adapted to play chromatic scales.

=== The Soldier String Quartet ===
In 1985 he founded the Soldier String Quartet, a punk chamber group that plays with amplification and a percussionist. As a leader, composer and violinist for the group, Soldier wrote and performed traditional pieces influenced by music styles including serialism, Delta blues and hip-hop. With inspiration from Haydn and Beethoven quartets, he explored anachronisms stemming from a classical ensemble playing in contemporary popular idioms, particularly rhythm and blues and punk rock. With a drummer incorporated into the quartet, Soldier found that string instruments could play the blues in the hands of players who understood the contrasting styles, including violinists Regina Carter and Todd Reynolds. The Soldier String Quartet also premiered and recorded works by other composers such as Elliott Sharp, Iannis Xenakis, Alvin Curran, Nicolas Collins, Fred Frith, Butch Morris, Zeena Parkins, Leroy Jenkins and Phill Niblock, as well as with jazz musicians including Tony Williams and Amina Claudine Myers. They recorded with the rock and pop musicians Guided by Voices, Lambchop, Bob Neuwirth, Ric Ocasek, Van Dyke Parks, and Jesse Harris and were the touring and recording group for the Velvet Underground's John Cale from 1992 to 1998, making many recordings together.

=== Experimental music ===
With Komar & Melamid, and inspired by their art project, "The People's Choice", Soldier wrote The People's Choice Music, with lyrics by Nina Mankin. It was written according to answers from a survey of over 500 Americans, resulting in "The Most Wanted Song" and "The Most Unwanted Song". The latter is over 22 minutes in length and features an operatic soprano rapping cowboy songs, holiday songs with a children's choir screaming advertisements, and political rants backed by bagpipe, banjo, tuba, piccolo, and church organ.

Soldier collaborates with the computer musician Brad Garton for the Brainwave Music Project, creating music played by performer's brainwaves using electroencephalograms.

Soldier realized the request by Johannes Kepler for a specific motet as related 400 years earlier in Harmonices Mundi, also known as The Music of the Spheres, a foundational book for modern physics. This microtonal piece for six a cappella singers, each portraying a different planet in the Solar System, had not been realized before according to Kepler's specific instructions, and is recorded in three dimensional virtual reality sound by Drazen Bosnjak with the vocal ensemble Ekmeles so that the planets revolve around the head of the listener. The resulting composition, "Motet: Harmony of the World", is co-credited to Kepler and Soldier.

He has a body of compositions using math derivations such as fractal manipulations, including a notorious 20-minute version of Chopin's Minute Waltz.

=== Concert music ===
Soldier's compositions with classical musicians include a socialist-realist opera, "Naked Revolution", based on paintings by the Russian conceptual artists Komar and Melamid, commissioned for the 25th anniversary of "The Kitchen".

The opera "The Eighth Hour of Amduat" uses as its text Italian translations of the ancient Egyptian of the book of Amduat and features Marshall Allen of the Sun Ra Arkestra playing the part of Sun Ra.

Soldier wrote two chamber operas in collaboration with author Kurt Vonnegut, "The Soldier's Story" and "Ice-9 Ballads", both recorded with Vonnegut playing characters.

Soldier's "Motet: Harmony of the World" closely followed Johannes Kepler's instructions and request to compose a microtonal Renaissance motet in the book Harmonice Mundi that would provide the music of the spheres, performed in the six voices of the planets, performed by the choir Ekemeles.

Many of his chamber and orchestra works were recorded by the Manhattan Chamber Orchestra under conductor Richard Auldon Clark, by the Composer's Concordance orchestra and by the Prague Filmharmonik, which is a recording orchestra from the Prague Philharmonic Orchestra. These include a collection of medieval Latin homoerotic lyrics in "Smut", and settings of Frederick Douglass in "The Apotheosis of John Brown" and Mark Twain in "War Prayer". The orchestra fanfare, "Samul Nori Overture", was commissioned by Kristjan Järvi and the Absolute Ensemble, a violin concerto composed of themes recorded on a home tape by Stuff Smith, "Stuff Smith's Unfinished Concerto", and "Jaleo", dedicated to the pianist-composer Eddie Palmieri.

Chamber works by Soldier have been recorded by violinists Regina Carter, Curtis Stewart, and Miranda Cuckson, cellist Erik Friedlander, pianists Steven Beck, Taka Kigawa and Christopher O'Riley, accordionist William Schimmel, the PubliQuartet, singer Eliza Carthy, and flutist Robert Dick.

=== Rock music ===
Soldier performed in the early 1980s with Bo Diddley and founded The Kropotkins in the 1990s, a punk/country blues band with the Memphis singer Lorette Velvette and the drummers Moe Tucker of The Velvet Underground, Charles Burnham of the James Blood Ulmer's Odyssey Band, and Jonathan Kane of Swans and La Monte Young's band; the Kropotkins recorded four albums and developed a cult following. He continued collaborations with Jonathan Kane in a symphonic minimalist blues duo known as Soldier Kane.

In the early 1980s, Soldier played guitar with Bo Diddley and various rock groups. He later worked as an arranger, violinist, or guitarist with John Cale, Guided by Voices, Van Dyke Parks, David Byrne, Ric Ocasek, Lee Ranaldo, Eliza Carthy, Maureen Tucker, Laurie Anderson, the Plastic People of the Universe, Jesse Harris, Pete Seeger, Richard Hell, and Bob Neuwirth.

Soldier led the touring group for John Cale, consisting of the Soldier String Quartet and B. J. Cole from 1992 to 1996, writing the groups arrangements for tours and several CDs and films including for Cale's scores for the Andy Warhol films "Eat" and "Kiss": his metal violin playing is featured on "Heartbreak Hotel" on Fragments of a Rainy Season. He led an flamenco/Middle Eastern rock group, The Spinozas, featuring lyrics from Arabic and Hebrew poetry from medieval Andalusia released on the album "Zajal".

=== Jazz ===
Soldier recorded as a multi-instrumentalist with the William Hooker Trio with Sabir Mateen and Roy Campbell, and has performed and recorded with Leroy Jenkins, Henry Threadgill, drummer Tony Williams, Jonas Hellborg, Butch Morris, Jason Hwang, William Parker, Billy Bang, Marshall Allen of the Sun Ra Arkestra, Karl Berger, Teo Macero, Myra Melford, Michael Wolff and Amina Claudine Myers.

=== Production ===
Soldier co-founded the EEG Records (formerly Mulatta Records) label in 2000, for which he has produced a wide variety of recordings including contemporary flamenco music by Pedro Cortes, Texas singer/ songwriter Vince Bell with Bob Neuwirth, the 30 piece jazz string orchestra Spontaneous River by Jason Hwang, jazz drummer William Hooker, the traditional group Wofa from Guinea with American R&B musicians including Bernie Worrell; the jazz French horn virtuoso John Clark (musician), the New York-Iranian santur virtuoso Alan Kushan and released music by David First, two albums of Fula flute music by Sylvain Leroux with children in Conakry, Guinea, Memphis musician Alex Greene, Ursel Schlicht, and Twink.

=== Film ===
Soldier arranged multiple film scores with John Cale, including Andy Warhol's films "Eat" and "Kiss", Julian Schnabel's "Basquiat" and Mary Harron's "I Shot Andy Warhol". His compositions for violin and piano are the basis for Winsome Brown's film "The Violinist". He wrote soundtracks for animations on the TV series Sesame Street and produced and scored an animation of his opera "The Eighth Hour of Amduat" based on the oldest known illustrated book.

== Personal life ==
Sulzer grew up in Carbondale in southern Illinois where he was exposed to music common to the area, particularly country and R&B. His earliest influences included James Brown and Isaac Hayes. He played viola, violin, piano, and eventually banjo and guitar. He moved with his family to Storrs, CT, at the age of 16, where he became enamoured with salsa music. He credits Eddie Palmieri's music as his inspiration to be a composer. He attended Michigan State University as an undergraduate and attempted a study of classical composition. He found that stultifying, however, and instead studied botany at the university and privately with the avant-garde jazz saxophonist/composer Roscoe Mitchell. He lived in Florida briefly, where he played guitar in Bo Diddley's band.

He relocated to New York in 1981, and played in various salsa, classical, and rock-oriented bands in the early '80s. In New York he engaged in many collaborations with producer Giorgio Gomelsky, including running "The House Band", the Russian conceptual artists Komar and Melamid, and co-wrote two extended musical theater pieces with author Kurt Vonnegut. While attending graduate school in biology at Columbia University, he privately studied composition with the co-inventor of the synthesizer and "tape music" Otto Luening and formed his Soldier String Quartet in 1985. He co-founded Mulatta Records in 2000 to document his projects, including the Thai Elephant Orchestra and recordings with child improvisers, and to produce a broad range of unusual musical styles.

Soldier performed, recorded, composed, and arranged for television and film (Sesame Street, I Shot Andy Warhol), and pop and jazz acts ranging from Pete Seeger to David Byrne and Guided by Voices. In 2021, his book "Music, Math, and Mind" on the physics and neuroscience of music was published by Columbia University Press. Sulzer is married to biologist Francesca Bartolini.

== Discography ==
Studio Albums as Leader

- 1988 Sequence Girls: Soldier String Quartet
- 1990 Romances From the Second Line piano music performed by Christopher O'Riley
- 1991 Sojourner Truth: Soldier String Quartet
- 1993 The Apotheosis of John Brown: oratorio with libretto from Frederick Douglass
- 1994 War Prayer; with the Manhattan Chamber Orchestra with libretto from Mark Twain
- 1994 Smut; with medieval Latin lyric poetry
- 1996 She's Lightning When She Smiles: Soldier String Quartet
- 1997 The People's Choice Music with Komar & Melamid
- 1997 Jazz Standards on Mars: Soldier String Quartet with Robert Dick
- 2000 The Tangerine Awkestra: with Katie Down and children from Fort Greene, Brooklyn
- 2001 Thai Elephant Orchestra
- 2001 Ice-9 Ballads: with Kurt Vonnegut as narrator and lyricist
- 2004 Elephonic Rhapsodies: with the Thai Elephant Orchestra
- 2004 Inspect for Damaged Gods: Soldier String Quartet
- 2005 Soldier Stories: with Kurt Vonnegut as actor and librettist
- 2006 Da Hiphop Raskalz: with children from East Harlem
- 2006 Chamber Music: classical works for small ensembles, double CD
- 2008 Yol K'u (Inside the Sun): Mayan Mountain Music with children from San Mateo Ixtatan, Guatemala
- 2011 Water Music: with the Thai Elephant Orchestra
- 2011 The Complete Victrola Sessions: works for violin and piano with Rebecca Cherry
- 2012 Organum: solo organ works inspired by patterns in nature, performed by Walter Hilse
- 2015 In Black & White: solo piano works, double CD, performed by Steven Beck
- 2015 In Four Color: music for string quartet, performed by the Soldier String Quartet and the PUBLIQuartet
- 2015 Smash Hits by the Thai Elephant Orchestra: with Richard Lair and Thai Elephant Orchestra
- 2015 With Kurt Vonnegut: radio opera and song cycle with Kurt Vonnegut's narration and libretti, and the Manhattan Chamber Orchestra
- 2016 Soldier Kane: duos composed and performed by Dave Soldier with Jonathan Kane
- 2016 Dean Swift's Satyrs for the Very Very Young: featuring singer Eliza Carthy, Soldier's music for lyrics by Jonathan Swift
- 2016 The Eighth Hour of Amduat: opera for mezzo, choir, and orchestra featuring saxophonist Marshall Allen playing Sun Ra
- 2017 History of the Kropotkins songs performed by the Kropotkins
- 2017 The Brainwave Music Project; with Brad Garton, Margaret Lancaster, William Hooker, Dan Trueman, Terry Pender, compositions for improvisers and brainwaves
- 2018 Naked Revolution: a socialist realist opera based on immigrant dreams, with artists Komar and Melamid and Russian singers
- 2019 Zajal: songs from ancient Andalusia in medieval Arabic, Hebrew and Spanish with flamenco, middle eastern, salsa and jazz musicians
- 2019 Jaleo: solo piano performed by Steven Beck
- 2021 February Meets Soldier String Quartet: duos composed and performed by Dave Soldier with Jonathan Kane
- 2021 Calo': solo violin works in flamenco forms performed by Miranda Cuckson with additional percussion by Jose Moreno and Pedro Cortes
- 2022 Motet: Harmonies of the World: choir in just intonation performed by Ekmeles according to the book by Harmonices Mundi also known as Music of the Spheres by Johannes Kepler with lyrics by Proclus
- 2022 LeWitt Etudes: experiments in group composition, co-led with William Hooker, featuring Etudes 7. 9. 16. 24, 39, 40, 43, 45, 48 with Luke Stewart, Kirk Knuffke, Rebecca Cherry, Alex Greene, Ken Filiano, Hans Tammen, Ishito Ayumi
- 2024 Songbird Instrumentals: four pieces improvised by zebra finches on tiny musical instruments
- 2024 Dave Soldier's Christmas Album: nine subversive holiday shopping mall songs
- 2024 Aventuras: suite of six works for alto saxophone and piano performed by Todd Rewoldt and Jai Jeffryes
- 2025 Symphony No. 1, The Ganesha: a symphony first performed by the Thai Elephant Orchestra and then transcribed and performed by a percussion orchestra of professional human musicians at MASS MoCA at a Bang on a Can retreat directed by David Cossin.
- 2026 Bambaataa Variations: live recording (December 7, 2013) of a concerto grosso for prepared string quartet (using springs, vibrators and other parephenalia) with string orchestra conducted by Thomas Carlo Bo based on themes from Afrika Bambaataa. The concert was attended by members of the Universal Zulu Nation and Soulsonic Force who invented the term "hip-hop" and gave a lecture on the piece.
- 2026 Vipers at the Onyx: Collection of Soldier's orchestral works conducted by Adam Klemens. Includes Stuff Smith's Unfinished Concerto performed by violinist Curtis Stewart, the six movement "Aventuras", "Jaleo' and "Samul Nori".
- 2026 Paiva River Songs: with Phill Niblock, David First, and William Hooker.

Collaborations

- 1993 Robert Dick Third Stone From the Sun; arranger, performer, composer
- 1996 The Kropotkins; performer, composer
- 1997 Robert Dick with the Soldier String Quartet, Jazz Standards on Mars: performer, arranger
- 2000 the Kropotkins, Five Points Crawl; performer, composer
- 2009 the Kropotkins, Paradise Square; performer, composer
- 2015 the Kropotkins, Portents of Love; performer, composer
- 2026 Paiva River Songs; Phill Niblock, David First, William Hooker, performer, co-composer
- Arranger, performer: John Cale, "Fragments From a Rainy Season", CD
- Arranger, conductor: John Cale, "Paris S'Eveille", CD
- Arranger, conductor: John Cale, "Antarida", CD
- Arranger, performer: John Cale, " "Walking on Locusts" CD
- Arranger: John Cale, "Dance Music" CD
- Arranger: Andy Warhol composed by John Cale "Eat/Kiss: Music for the Films by Andy Warhol" CD
- Arranger: Christina Rosenvinge "Foreign Land" CD
- Arranger, performer: Guided by Voices "Isolation Drills", CD
- Arranger, performer: Guided by Voices "Hold on Hope", CD
- Arranger, performer: Guided by Voices "Do the Collapse" CD

Recordings with the Soldier String Quartet

- Last Day on Earth; Bob Neuwirth, John Cale
- Walking on Locusts, John Cale
- Eat and Kiss, John Cale
- Fragments From a Rainy Season, John Cale
- Hammer Anvil Stirrup, Elliott Sharp
- Larynx, Elliott Sharp
- Tessalation Row, Elliott Sharp
- Twistmap, Elliott Sharp
- Abstract Repressionism, Elliott Sharp
- Cryptoid Fragments, Elliott Sharp
- Xeno-Codex, Elliott Sharp
- Rheo/Umbra, Elliott Sharp
- String Quartets 1986-1996, Elliott Sharp
- Early Winter, Phill Niblock
- Themes & Improvisations on the Blues, Leroy Jenkins
- A Dark & Stormy Night, Nicolas Collins
- The Word, Jonas Hellborg & Tony Williams
- Third Stone from the Sun, Robert Dick

Sideman

- The Ordinaires The Ordinaires (1987, Dossier) violin
- Lorette Velvette Lost Part of Me (1998, Veracity) banjo, violin
- Elliott Sharp & Carbon Larynx (1987, SST) violin
- Bob Neuwirth & John Cale "Last Day on Earth" arranger, performer
- Le Nouvelles Polyponies Corses (Corsican Polyphony) Le Praiduisu (1999, Mercury) violin, arranger
- Sussan Deyhim Madman of God (1999, Crammed Disc) violin, remixed by Bill Laswell as Shy Angels (2008)
- While the Music Lasts, Jesse Harris
- William Hooker TrioYearn For Certainty: performer, trio with Sabir Mateen 2010
- William Hooker Trio Heart of the Sun: performer, trio with Roy Campbell Jr. 2013
- William Hooker Aria: performer, arranger 2016
- Mandeng Eletrik (2004, Mulatta) violin
- Elliott Sharp & Carbon Abstract Repressionism, violin (1992, Victo) violin
- Elliott Sharp & Carbon Syndakit, violin (1999, Zoar) violin

Film Scores

- Arranger: John Cale film scores: "Paris S'Eveille", "Antarida", "Walking on Locusts", "Dance Music"
- Arranger: films by Andy Warhol composed by John Cale "Eat/Kiss: Music for the Films by Andy Warhol"
- Arranger, Conductor: Mary Harron director film score I Shot Andy Warhol
- Arranger: Julian Schnabel director, film score Basquiat
- Composer: Vanessa Ly, director, film score Mekong Interior
- Composer: Nadia Roden, director, cartoon scores Sesame Street
- Composer: Winsome Brown, director, film score The Violinist
- Composer: Vicki Bennett, director, film score (partial) Gesture Piece
- Composer: Dave Soldier, director, animation The Eighth Hour of Amduat
- Composer: Deborah Kampmeier, director, film score (partial), "Hounddog"
- Composer: Kate Taverna, Alan Adleson, directors, film score, "In Bed with Ulysses"
- Performer: Phill Niblock, director, "China"

Producer

- Jason Kao Hwang and Spontaneous River Orchestra Symphony of Souls CD, Mulatta Records, 2013
- Pedro Cortes Los Viejos Non Mueren CD, Mulatta Records, 2014
- Sylvain Leroux with children from Conakry, Guinea Les Enfants de Tyabala and Tyabla CDs, Mulatta Records, 2015, 2019
- Archer Spade Orbital Harmony CD, Mulatta Records, 2015
- William Hooker Aria: performer, producer, 2016
- John Clark Sonus Inenarrabilis (Mulatta Records), works for 9 piece chamber group, CD, Mulatta Records, 2016
- Robert Dick and Ulrike Lentz Are There? (Mulatta Records), flute duos CD, Mulatta Records, 2017
- Vince Bell Ojo (Mulatta Records), co-production with Bob Neuwirth, Mulatta Records, 2018
- William Hooker Pillars ... at the Portal, Multatta Records, 2018
- Alan Kushan Santur, EEG Records, 2023

== Compositions for Classical Musicians ==
Opus	Composition	Year	Instrumentation
1	Sequence Girls	1985	String quartet and drums
2	Three Delta Blues (arrangements of Robert Johnson, Skip James, Charlie Patton)	1986	String quartet
3	String Quartet #1, “The Impossible”	1987	String quartet and drums
4	Duo Sonata	1988	Violin and cello. premiered by Erik Friedlander
5	To Spike Jones in Heaven	1988	Accordion and tape, premiered by William Schimmel
6	Hockets and Inventions	1990	Twelve Polyphonic Pieces for Organ or piano, premiered by Walter Hilse, Steven Beck
7	Utah Dances	1990	Solo saxophone, clarinet, or flute, premiered by Ulrich Krieger, Michael Swartz
8	The Apotheosis of John Brown (settings of Frederick Douglass)	1990	Oratorio for vocal soloists, solo violin, string orchestra, premiered by Robbie McCauley, narrator, Richard Auldon Clark, conductor,
9	Ultraviolet Railroad	1991	Concerto for violin, cello and piano trio, or trio with orchestra, or string quartet, premiered by Mark Feldman and Erik Friedlander, Richard Auldon Clark, conductor
10	Smut, a.k.a. "Chorea Lascivia" (text from medieval Latin homoerotic poetry)	1991	Song cycle of Latin homoerotic poetry from the Middle Ages for vocal soloists for singers, electric guitars, percussion, tpt, tbone
11	String Quartet #2, “Bambaataa Variations”	1992	Prepared string quartet or quartet with string orchestra, premiered by PubliQuartet and Composer's Concordance
12	Mark Twain's War Prayer	1993	Oratorio for vocal soloists, gospel choir, orchestra / alternate version with organ, premiered by Richard Auldon Clark, conductor
13	Sontag in Sarajevo	1994	Accordion, melody instrument, guitar, premiered by Regina Carter
14	Ice-9 Ballads (text and narration by Kurt Vonnegut)	1995	Song cycle for vocals and chamber group, premiered by Kurt Vonnegut narrator, Richard Auldon Clark, conductor
15	The People's Choice Music: the Most Wanted and The Most Unwanted Song (with Komar and Melamid, lyrics Nina Mankin)	1997	Singers and chamber group, Most Wanted with karaoke parts, features Vernon Reid, Andy Snitzer
16	Naked Revolution, with Komar and Melamid, libretto Maita di Niscemi	1997	A socialist realist opera with soloists, chorus, and orchestra, premiered by conductor Richard Auldon Clark, countertenor Oleg Ryabets, for The Kitchen's 25th anniversary
17	East St. Louis 1968	1999	Viola solo or string quartet with tape, premiered Richard Auldon Clark, PubliQuartet
18	A Soldier's Story (written with Kurt Vonnegut)	1992	Radio opera for vocal soloists and chamber group, premiered by Kurt Vonnegut, conducted Richard Audlon Clark
19	Clever Hans	2005	ballet in ancient sonata form in six variations for violin, cello, harpsichord
20	The Complete Victrola Sessions	2010	12 piece Collection for violin and piano, one with recording of Meade Lux Lewis for the film The Violinist by Winsome Brown, premiered by Rebecca Cherry
20b	Four Nocturnes	2010	Piano, four pieces from opus 20 arranged for solo piano, premiered by Steven Beck
21	Five Little Monsters	1984, 2010	Piano or string quartet and drums, premiered by Steven Beck
22	Variations on Chopin's Minute Waltz	2010	Piano and electronics, some playable, some probably not
23	String Quartet #3, "The Essential”	2011	Quartet and electroencephalograms (with Brad Garton), premiered by the PubliQuartet
24	Dean Swift's Satyrs for the Very Very Young (settings of Jonathan Swift)	2011	Eleven pieces for vocal soloist, flute, viola, harp, premiered Eliza Carthy. Robert Dick, Richard Auldon Clark
25	Organum	2011	Five pieces for organ, premiered by Walter Hilse
26	Fractals on the Names of Bach & Haydn	2011	Piano, premiered by Walter Hilse, Steven Beck
27	Letter to Gil Evans	1986, 2012	Piano, premiered by Steven Beck
28	girl with hat in a car	2012	Piano, premiered by Steven Beck
29	Letter to Skip James	1987, 2012	Piano, premiered by Steven Beck
30	Thung Kwian Sunrise (arranged from the Thai Elephant Orchestra)	2012	Orchestra
31	Phong's Solo (arranged from the Thai Elephant Orchestra)	2012	Piano, premiered by Steven Beck
32	SamulNori	2013	Orchestra, premiered Prague Filmharmonik
33	The Eighth Hour of Amduat (libretto from ancient Egypt)	2015	Opera for vocal soloists, choir, improvisers, and orchestra
33b	Three Songs from the Egyptian Underworld (libretto from ancient Egypt)	2015	mezzo and piano
34	Lewitt Etudes, Architectural designs for musicians (after Sol Lewitt)	2015	Fifty group compositions for any instruments, premiered by William Hooker and musicians
35	Stuff Smith's Unfinished Concerto "Music starts where words leave off"	2017	Violin and orchestra, concerto made from themes transcribed from a private solo recording by Stuff Smith, premiered by Curtis Stewart and the Prague Filmharmonik
36	Jaleo	2017	Piano solo or orchestra, premiered by the Prague Filmharmonik, Steven Beck, dedicated to Eddie Palmieri
37	Vienna Over the Hills / Wien Über den Hügeln	2017	Six or more violins, optional drums and electric guitars
38	Calo'	2018	Six etudes for solo violin in Gyspy flamenco palos: buleria, seguiriyas, alegria, solea, saeta, taranta, premiered by Miranda Cuckson
39	Motet: Harmonies of the World	2022	Four part motet for 6 voices in just intonation according to Harmonices Mundi by Johannes Kepler, alternate version with continuo, premiered by Ekmeles
40	Laudato Si' (28 minutes)	2022	Choir (SATB) and piano, setting of St. Frances of Assisi's Canticle of the Creatures
41	Symphony #1 "The Ganesha" (2022, 11 minutes)	2022	mixed percussion, harmonica, 3 string bass, a transcription of the Thai Elephant Orchestra, in a form that can be played by human musicians
42	Aventuras	2022–2024	Suite of six pieces for orchestra or alto saxophone and piano: New York Bars at Dawn, El Amancer, Lorette Velvette, Rahsaan, Albayzin, Kumiho: Kumiho is also available for piri and piano, premiered by the Prague Filmharmonik, Todd Revoldt, Jai Jeffryes, Gamin on piri
43	Figurines	2025	Twelve preludes for solo piano for twelve artists: Shirin Neshat, Kevork Mourad, Kerry James Marshall, Mahmoud Hamadani, William Eggleston, Cecily Brown, Alexander Melamid, Richard McGuire, Mark Kostabi, Vitaly Komar, Keith Haring, Jean Michel Basquiat
