= Eat/Kiss: Music for the Films by Andy Warhol =

Soundtrack album by John Cale
- Released: 10 June 1997
- Recorded: 1995
- Genre: Classical
- Length: 66:40
- Label: Hannibal
- Producer: John Cale

John Cale chronology
Walking on Locusts (1996)	Eat/Kiss: Music for the Films by Andy Warhol (1997)	Dance Music (1998)

Professional ratings
Review scores
Source	Rating
AllMusic	2.5/5 stars

Eat/Kiss: Music for the Films by Andy Warhol is a soundtrack album by Welsh multi-instrumentalist and composer John Cale. It was released in 1997 on Hannibal Records. Cale composed this music for a screening of two Andy Warhol films, Eat and Kiss. It was premiered in 1994 with two other The Velvet Underground members, guitarist Sterling Morrison and drummer Maureen Tucker. The band included Dave Soldier and the Soldier String Quartet and pedal steel guitarist B.J. Cole. An album version was recorded the year after without Morrison in Lille, France.

== Track listing ==
Part 1 − Kiss

1. "Movement 01" − 2:59
2. "Movement 02" − 7:33
3. "Movement 03" − 4:30
4. "Movement 04" − 3:48
5. "Movement 05" − 1:58
6. "Movement 06" − 5:21
7. "Movement 07" − 1:52
8. "Movement 08" − 1:15
9. "Movement 09" − 5:14
10. "Movement 10" − 4:33
11. "Movement 11" − 6:14

Part 2 − Eat

1. "Movement 12" − 8:22
2. "Movement 13" − 7:01
3. "Movement 14" − 3:56
4. "Movement 15" − 2:04

== Personnel ==
- John Cale − keyboards, composer
- B. J. Cole − pedal steel guitar, piano
- The Soldier String Quartet featuring:
  - David Soldier − 12 string guitar, violin, metal violin, arranger
  - Todd Reynolds − violin
  - Martha Mooke − viola
  - Dawn Buckholtz − cello
- Jimmy Justice, Tiye' Giraud − vocals
- Maureen Tucker − percussion
- Martin Brass − engineer
