= Phill Niblock =

American multimedia artist (1933–2024)

- Phill Niblock
- Born: Phillip Earl Niblock; October 2, 1933; Anderson, Indiana, U.S.
- Died: January 8, 2024 (aged 90); New York City, U.S.
- Education: Indiana University
- Occupations: Composer; Filmmaker; Videographer
- Years active: 1968–2024
- Known for: Art film, Drone music, Minimalism

Phillip Earl Niblock (October 2, 1933 – January 8, 2024) was an American composer, filmmaker, and videographer. In 1985, he was appointed director of Experimental Intermedia, a foundation for avant-garde music based in New York with a parallel branch in Ghent, Belgium.

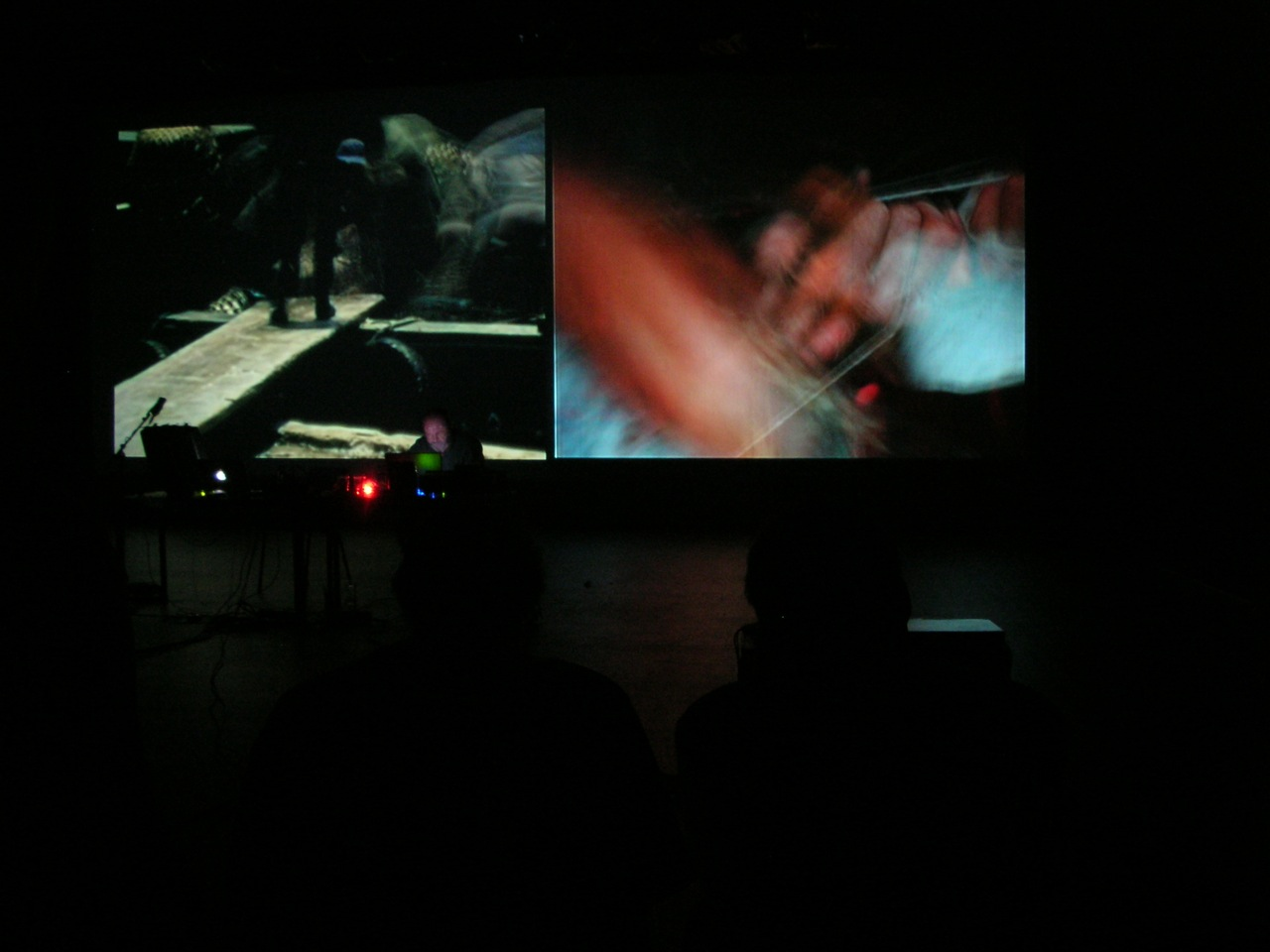
Niblock (center left) at the Random Cube Festival in Oslo, 2006

== Early life and education ==
Niblock was born in Anderson, Indiana on October 2, 1933, to Herbert and Thelma Niblock. He attended Indiana University and graduated with a BA in economics in 1956. He served a brief stint in the U.S. Army after graduating, and in 1958, he moved to New York, where he worked as a photographer and filmmaker. Much of this activity centered around photographing and filming jazz musicians and modern dancers. An epiphany occurred while riding a motorcycle in the Appalachian Mountains. Niblock was climbing a grade behind a slow-moving diesel truck when the revolutions of both vehicles' engines nearly synchronized. "The strong physical presence of the beats resulting from the two engines running at slightly different frequencies put me in such a trance that I nearly rode off the side of the mountain."

== Career ==
Niblock's first musical compositions date from 1968. Unusually, even among the avant-garde composers of his generation, he had no formal musical training. He cited the musical activities of New York in the 1960s (and occasional memorable performances, such as the premiere of Morton Feldman's Durations pieces) as a stimulus. All of his compositions were worked out intuitively rather than systematically. His early works were all done with tape, overdubbing unprocessed recordings of precisely tuned long tones played on traditional instruments in four, eight, or sixteen tracks. Since the late 1990s his music has been created with computer technology, notably with Pro Tools on a Macintosh computer. His later works are correspondingly more dense in texture, sometimes involving as many as forty tracks.

Niblock also made a number of films and videos, including several in a series titled The Movement of People Working. The series was filmed primarily in rural environments in many countries and regions of the world (China, Brazil, Portugal, Lesotho, Puerto Rico, Hong Kong, the Arctic, Mexico, Hungary, the Adirondacks, Peru) between 1973 and 1991. The films look at everyday work, frequently agrarian or marine labor, and are notable for their stark realism, consistent use of long takes, limited camera movement, and striking juxtaposition of non-fiction content and vivid colors. These scenes of the movement of human manual labor are treated abstractly without explicit anthropological or sociological commentary. As in his music, Niblock counters the static surface of the work with an active, varied texture of rhythm and form achieved by the bodies in motion within the frame; this is what Niblock considered to be the ultimate subject matter of his films.

Niblock's music and performances have been staged at various art institutions, including the Kitchen, the Museum of Modern Art, the World Music Institute at Merkin Hall, and Carpenter Center for the Visual Arts. In early 2013, his diverse artistic career was the subject of a retrospective exhibition entitled Nothin’ but Working, curated by Mathieu Copeland and realised in partnership between Circuit (Contemporary Art Centre Lausanne) and Musée de l’Elysée, Lausanne. The retrospective toured in 2015 and 2016 as Phill Niblock, Working for a Title to Dům umění, Dům pánů z Kunštátu in Brno, Czech Republic. A catalogue devoted to Niblock's wide intermedia art, Phill Niblock, Nothing but working, written and edited by Mathieu Copeland was published in 2023 by Verlag der buchhandlung Walther und Franz Koenig.

He taught at the College of Staten Island, a CUNY school, from 1971 to 1998.

== Music style ==
Niblock's music is an exploration of sound textures created by multiple tones in very dense, often atonal tunings (generally microtonal in conception) performed in long durations. The layering of long tones only very slightly distinct in pitch creates a multitude of beats and generates complex overtone patterns and other fascinating psychoacoustic effects. The combination of apparently static surface textures and extremely active harmonic movement generates a highly original music that, while having things in common with early drone-based Minimalism, is utterly distinct in sound and technique. Niblock's work continues to influence a generation of musicians, especially younger players from a variety of musical genres.

Niblock's compositional process usually begins with recordings of single, absolute tones played by a specific musician, with the breathing and attack and decay edited out; these single tones are then layered, creating a monumental, continuous sound. Collaborations with such musicians were crucial to his composing life, and the range of musicians with whom he worked include David Gibson, in the cello works of the 1970s; Petr Kotik, Susan Stenger, and Eberhard Blum, on Four Full Flutes; Rafael Toral, David First, Lee Ranaldo, Thurston Moore, Susan Stenger, and Robert Poss on Guitar Too, for Four (G2,44+1x2); Ulrich Krieger, Carol Robinson, Kaspar T. Toeplitz, and Reinhold Friedl, on Touch Food; Dave Soldier and the Soldier String Quartet on Five More String Quartets, Early Winter; and many others. In the last decade of his life he produced several works for orchestra: Disseminate, Three Orchids (for three orchestras), Tow for Tom (for two orchestras), and 4 Chorch + 1, the latter a commission for the Ostrava Music Days 2007 for chorus and orchestra with solo baritone (Thomas Buckner). The premieres of all these works were conducted by Petr Kotik.

In performance, live musicians may play, wandering through the audience changing the sound texture through reinforcement of or interference with the existing tunings. Simultaneously, Niblock generally accompanied performances by presenting his films and videos (often those from The Movement of People Working series, or computer-driven, black-and-white abstract images floating through time). These performances fell into two types: (1) an installation of several hours' duration, with the music pieces played consecutively, with a long loop of several hours of work before repetition, and with multiple images that are shown simultaneously; or (2) a performance, with several simultaneous works of music and film, usually lasting between one and three hours. In these performances Niblock generally projected three (or more) film images simultaneously, on large screens three to four meters wide. The films are 16 mm and color. The music was produced from stereo or quad tapes, with four or more speakers in the corners of the space. His later video pieces were played individually or with several simultaneously, using large video monitors.

== Experimental Intermedia Foundation ==
In 1968, Niblock became an artist-member of Elaine Summers' Experimental Media, frequently hosting live music events for the foundation from his Chinatown loft, which were attended by musicians like Arthur Russell, John Cage, and David Behrman. In 1985, Niblock became the director of the Experimental Intermedia Foundation, a position he held until his death in 2024. Niblock received a 1994 Foundation for Contemporary Arts Grants to Artists Award and a 2014 Foundation for Contemporary Arts John Cage award. He was the producer of music and Intermedia presentations at EI since 1973 (about 1,000 performances) and the curator of EI's XI Records label. In 1993, he opened a house with window gallery at Sassekaai 45 in Ghent, Belgium, and, in 1997, the coordinating committee—Phill Niblock, Maria Blondeel, Zjuul Devens, Lieve D'hondt, and Ludo Engels—founded a Belgian organization, the Experimental Intermedia v.z.w., Ghent.

Phill Niblock's music is available on the XI, Moikai, Mode Records, and Touch labels. A double-sided DVD of films and music, lasting nearly four hours, is available on the Extreme label.

== Death ==
Niblock died at hospital in New York City on January 8, 2024, from heart failure.

== Discography ==
- Working Touch, 2022.
- Sound Collages, Koo Editions 2021
- BAOBAB, The Dorf/Phill Niblock 2019
- Touch Five, 2013.
- Touch Strings, 2009.
- G2 44 +/X 2, 2006.
- Touch Three, 2006.
- Disseminate, 2004.
- The Movement of People Working (DVD), 2003
- Touch Food, 2003.
- Touch Works, for Hurdy Gurdy and Voice, 2000.
- A Young Person’s Guide to Phill Niblock (or short: YPGPN), 1994.
- Music by Phill Niblock, 1993
- Four Full Flutes, 1990

== Filmography and videography ==
- Morning (1966–67, B&W, 16mm, 17 min., sound)
- The Magic Sun (1966–68, B&W, 16mm, 17 min., sound) with Sun Ra
- Max (1966–68, B&W, 16mm, 7:30 min., sound) with Max Neuhaus
- Annie (1968, color, 16mm, 8 min., sound)
- Dog Track (1969, color, 16mm, 8.5 min., sound)
- Raoul (1968–69, color, 16mm, 20 min., sound)
- THIR (aka Ten Hundred Inch Radii and Environments IV) (1970, color, 16mm, 45 min., sound)
- The Movement of People Working Series (1973–91, color, 16mm unless otherwise indicated, silent):
  - Sur Uno and Dos (Mexico and Peru) (45 min.)
  - Trabajando Uno and Dos (Mexico) (45 min.)
  - Tres Familias: Essex, La Purificacion, and Alpatlahua (90 min.)
  - Four Libros (45 min.)
  - James Bay (45 min.)
  - Arctic (45 min.)
  - Hong Kong (45 min.)
  - South Africa (45 min.)
  - Lesotho (45 min.)
  - Portugal (45 min.)
  - Brasil 83 (Part 1 & 2) (75 min.)
  - Brasil 84 (Part 1 & 2) (90 min.)
  - Hungary (Part 1 & 2) (75 min.)
  - China 86 (120 min.)
  - China 87 (120 min.)
  - China 88 (Part 1, 2, & 3) (120 min.)
  - Japan 89 (Part 1 & 2) (120 min.)
  - Sumatra (video)
  - Romania (Part 1) (video)
- Poets and Talkers (1975–1988, 16mm & video, 120 min., sound) with Armand Schwerner, Hannah Weiner, Erica Hunt, Dagmar Apel, and Charlie Morrow
- Anecdotes from Childhood (1986–92, color, video, sound)
- Terrace of Unintelligibility (1988, color, 3/4-inch U-matic video, 20 min., sound) with Arthur Russell (musician), voice, cello
- Muna Torso (1992, color, video, 20 min., sound)
- Topolo 1 (2005, video, 11 min., silent)
- Topolo 2 (2009, video, 15 min., silent)
- Remo Osaka 1 (2009, color, SD mini-DV, 75 min., sound)
- Remo Osaka 2 (2010, color, SD mini-DV, 105 min., sound)
- Meudrone 1 (2013, color, HD video, 30 min., sound)
- Meudrone 2 (2014, color, HD video, 30 min., sound)
- Vain4 BCN (2015, color, HD video, 19 min., sound)
- Agosto NOSND (2017, color, HD video, 19 min., sound)
- Pulp Elder A (2018, color, HD video, 5 min., sound)
- HookerNiblock (2015–19, color, HD video, 18 min., sound) with William Hooker, drums
