= Fragments of a Rainy Season =

Live album by John Cale
- Released: 25 September 1992
- Genre: Art rock
- Length: 70:58
- Label: Hannibal
- Producers: John Cale; Jean-Michel Reusser

John Cale chronology
Paris s'eveille - suivi d'autres compositions (1991)	Fragments of a Rainy Season (1992)	23 Solo Pieces for La Naissance de L'Amour (1993)

Professional ratings
Review scores
Source	Rating
AllMusic	4.5/5 stars
Trouser Press	favourable

Fragments of a Rainy Season is a 1992 live solo album by the Welsh rock musician John Cale, performed at various locations during his 1992 tour. A 16-track DVD, recorded at the Centre for Fine Arts, Brussels (Palais des Beaux-Arts, now BOZAR) in Brussels, Belgium, that features the tracks in the order in which they were performed, was also released. The album cover was designed by noted conceptual artist Joseph Kosuth.

== Critical reception ==
Juke said of Cale, "His playing is uncomplicated. His voice, like so many other great rock voice, appears first as being limited and inadequate, only to blossom with repeated listenings into a fascinating, expressive instrument. Twenty songs in such an unimbellished style seems like hard work. Well, it is, but the rewards are worth the effort."

== Track listing ==
All songs composed by John Cale; except where indicated.

Original 1992 release
No.	Title	Writer(s)	Length
1.	"A Child's Christmas in Wales"		3:06
2.	"Dying on the Vine"	Words: Larry Sloman	3:51
3.	"Cordoba"	John Cale, Brian Eno	3:22
4.	"Darling I Need You"		3:22
5.	"Paris 1919"		3:29
6.	"Guts"		3:03
7.	"Fear (Is a Man's Best Friend)"		4:07
8.	"Ship of Fools"		3:44
9.	"Leaving It Up to You"		3:32
10.	"The Ballad of Cable Hogue"		2:55
11.	"Thoughtless Kind"		2:40
12.	"On a Wedding Anniversary"	Words: Dylan Thomas	3:43
13.	"Lie Still, Sleep Becalmed"	Words: Thomas	1:21
14.	"Do Not Go Gentle Into That Good Night"	Words: Thomas	3:38
15.	"Buffalo Ballet"		2:50
16.	"Chinese Envoy"		3:15
17.	"Style It Takes"	Lou Reed, John Cale	2:58
18.	"Heartbreak Hotel"	Mae Boren Axton, Tommy Durden, Elvis Presley	6:14
19.	"(I Keep A) Close Watch"		2:33
20.	"Hallelujah"	Leonard Cohen	5:16

2016 re-release track listing (disc 1)
No.	Title	Writer(s)	Length
1.	"On a Wedding Anniversary"	Words: Thomas	3:43
2.	"Lie Still, Sleep Becalmed"	Words: Thomas	1:21
3.	"Do Not Go Gentle Into That Good Night"	Words: Thomas	3:38
4.	"Cordoba"	Cale, Eno	3:22
5.	"Buffalo Ballet"		2:50
6.	"A Child's Christmas in Wales"		3:06
7.	"Darling I Need You"		3:22
8.	"Guts"		3:03
9.	"Ship of Fools"		3:44
10.	"Leaving It Up to You"		3:32
11.	"The Ballad of Cable Hogue"		2:55
12.	"Chinese Envoy"		3:15
13.	"Dying on the Vine"	Words: Sloman	3:51
14.	"Fear (Is a Man's Best Friend)"		4:07
15.	"Heartbreak Hotel"	Axton, Durden, Presley	6:14
16.	"Style It Takes"	Reed, Cale	2:58
17.	"Paris 1919"		3:29
18.	"(I Keep A) Close Watch"		2:33
19.	"Thoughtless Kind"		2:40
20.	"Hallelujah"	Cohen	5:16

2016 re-release track listing (disc 2)
No.	Title	Writer(s)	Version	Length
1.	"Fear (Is a Man's Best Friend)"		Outtake	4:29
2.	"Amsterdam"		Outtake	3:01
3.	"Broken Hearts"	Bob Neuwirth, Cale	Outtake	3:04
4.	"I'm Waiting for the Man"	Reed	Outtake	4:31
5.	"Heartbreak Hotel"	Axton, Durden, Presley	Outtake - strings	6:00
6.	"Fear (Is a Man's Best Friend)"		Outtake - strings	3:40
7.	"Paris 1919"		Outtake - strings	3:52
8.	"Antarctica Starts Here"		Outtake - strings	2:29

=== Singles ===
"Heartbreak Hotel" / "(I Keep A) Close Watch" / "You Know More Than I Know" / "Heartbreak Hotel" CD-EP France 1992. (2,3,4: previously unreleased performances)

"Where There's a Will" / "(I Keep A) Close Watch" / "You Know More Than I Know" / "Heartbreak Hotel" CD-EP France 1992. (all previously unreleased performances; came with the French music magazine Les Inrockuptiles, titled "More Fragments")

== Personnel ==
- John Cale - vocals, piano, guitar

Soldier String Quartet

- Dave Soldier - violin and metal violin on "Heartbreak Hotel", string arrangements
- Todd Reynolds - violin
- Martha Mooke - viola
- Dawn Avery - cello

with:

- B.J. Cole - steel guitar

== Notes ==
The album features a cover version of Leonard Cohen's Hallelujah. Cale's abridged version of Cohen's lyrics now form the basis of most other cover versions of the song, with the Cohen version being 15 stanzas long.

== Charts ==
Chart (2016–17)	Peak position
Belgian Albums (Ultratop Flanders)	102
New Zealand Heatseekers Albums (RMNZ)	6
