= The Kropotkins =

American musical group

The Kropotkins are an American avant-garde music collective based in Memphis and New York City founded in 1994 by drummer Jonathan Kane and Dave Soldier, who is best known as a violinist but plays banjo in the group. Its other members have included Lorrette Velvette (vocals), Samm Bennett (percussion), Moe Tucker of the Velvet Underground (bass drum), Mark Feldman (violin), Mark Deffenbaugh (bass, also known as Dog), Alex Greene (bass drum and keyboards) and Charles Burnham (violin). The band is named after Russian anarchist Peter Kropotkin. In 1999, the group had six members. Soldier had the idea to start the band while performing with John Cale at a concert in Germany; Soldier has described this idea as "a kind of epiphany."

Their CD "Portents of Love" features a cover pencil sketch portrait of Federico Garcia Lorca with some of his Spanish lyrics transplanted from Andalusia to north Mississippi, and was produced by Bob Neuwirth.

== Critical reception ==
Tony Scherman awarded the Kropotkins' eponymous debut album a B+ grade, describing it as "funky and listenable." David Krasnow reviewed their May 2001 performance at Joe's Pub favorably, writing that "This is reality music, man, and we need more of it.".

Gary van Tersch writing in SingOut writes "Named after the Russian anarchist prince Peter Kropotkin, this New York City and Memphis-based sextet was created in 1994 by singer-songwriter, multi-instrumentalist and neuroscientist Dave Soldier along with adroit percussionist Jonathan Kane after they were exposed to the homemade abandon of North Mississippi rhythm ‘n’ blues and fife and drum music. Soldier also acknowledges both Bill Monroe (a bouncy vision of his instrumental gem “Stoney Lonesome” is here) and Howlin’ Wolf as influences along with some unreleased hill country tapes recorded by folklorist Alan Lomax and cassettes of Junior Kimbrough, R.L. Burnside and Othar Turner that venerated journalist Robert Palmer gave him."

The New Yorker writes "The Kropotkins, a long-standing avant-blues group based in New York and Memphis, début new material for a forthcoming record called “Union Square.” The group’s musical passions encompass both classical icons like Charles Ives and bluesmen like Mississippi Fred McDowell, and this new record will continue in that catholic vein, featuring covers of Gershwin and Bill Monroe tunes."; and "In 1994, inspired by the fife-and-drum blues of northern Mississippi and the bluegrass inventor Bill Monroe, the iconoclastic downtown composer and scientist Dave Soldier (he’s a professor of neurology at Columbia) formed the Kropotkins, named after the Russian anarchist Peter Kropotkin. While the group is conventional by the standards of some of Soldier’s other projects (he once created enormous instruments for a group of Thai elephants to play), it can nonetheless seamlessly weave a Charles Ives cover into a set of soulful, if sometimes angular, country- or blues-tinged originals. Besides Soldier, who plays violin and banjo, the sextet includes the co-founder Jonathan Kane on snare drum, the Memphis-based singer Lorette Velvette, and the sweet-toned violinist and singer Charlie Burnham."

== Discography ==
- The Kropotkins (Mulatta Records, 1996)
- Five Points Crawl (Mulatta, 2000)
- Paradise Square (Mulatta, 2010) with B.J. Cole on pedal steel guitar
- Portents of Love (Mulatta, 2015)
- Land of A Million Dances / Madamoiselle Mabry (EEG, 2023)
