= Ana Maria Cuervo =

Spanish scientist and biochemist (born 1966)

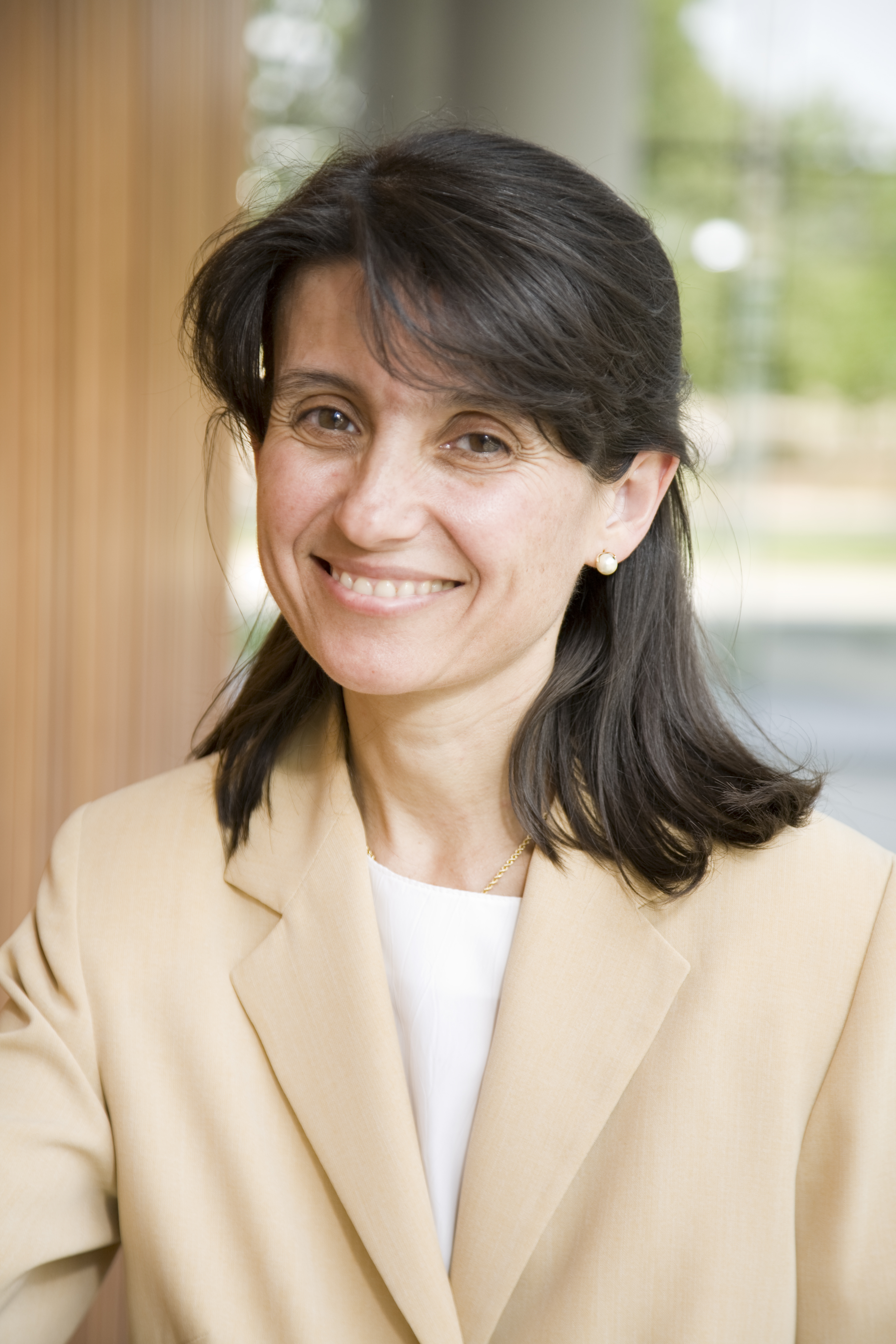
- Ana Maria Cuervo in 2008
- Born: July 14, 1966 (age 60); Barcelona, Spain
- Occupations: Scientist, cell biologist
- Known for: Chaperone-mediated autophagy research
- Website: Research lab

Ana Maria Cuervo (born 14 July 1966) is a Spanish-American physician, researcher, and cell biologist. She is a distinguished professor in developmental and molecular biology and medicine and co-director of the Institute for Geroscience at the Albert Einstein College of Medicine. She is best known for her research work on autophagy, the process by which cells recycle waste products, and its changes in aging and age-related diseases.

== Biography ==
Cuervo was born in Barcelona, Spain, on 14 July 1966. She studied medicine at the University of Valencia in 1986 and further pursued a PhD in biochemistry and molecular biology under the mentorship of Erwin Knecht, a biochemist studying lysosomes and proteosome at the time. In 1993, she published her first academic paper as a co-author on lysosomal degradation which challenged the assumption that it was non-specific. Cuervo also worked with Fred “Paulo” Dice of Tufts University on lysosomes during the summer months as Spanish labs were closed during this time of year. Cuervo later accepted a full-time post-doctorate position at Dice's laboratory and focused on understanding this selective lysosomal degradation pathway. From 1994 to 2000, Cuervo and Dice published their findings on this pathway, identified the lysosomal membrane protein LAMP2A as the receptor for this form of autophagy and termed it chaperone-mediated autophagy (CMA).

In October 2001, Cuervo accepted a faculty position at the Albert Einstein College of Medicine in The Bronx, New Yorkwhere she continues primarily focused on chaperone-mediated autophagy and its role in aging and human disease.

== Academic and scientific activities ==
Cuervo is the co-director of the Einstein Institute for Aging Research and a member of the Einstein Liver Research Center and Cancer Center. She is also the Robert and Renée Belfer Chair for the Study of Neurodegenerative Diseases at Albert Einstein College of Medicine. In 2015 she was elected International Academic of the Royal Academy of Medicine of the Valencia Community, in 2017 member of the Real Academia de Ciencias Exactas, Fisicas y Naturales and in 2021 member of the Royal Academy of Farmacy in Spain. Dr. Cuervo is also one of the funding members of the Academy of Geroscience. In 2018, Cuervo was elected a member of the American Academy of Arts and Sciences and in 2019 to the National Academy of Sciences.

She has also served as a member of the National Institute on Aging (NIA) Scientific Council, NIH Scientific Council of Councils, NIA Board of Scientific Counselors and in the Advisory Committee to the NIH Deputy Director. Dr. Cuervo is also one of the founding members of the Women in Autophagy (WIA) network dedicate to promote careers of young scientist interested in autophagy.

Cuervo was co-editor-in-chief of the Aging Cell journal from 2007 until 2021 and serves in the editorial board of Cell Metabolism, Molecular Cell, PNAS and Geromedicine. She has been involved in more than 300 publications. Dr. Cuervo has been included in the 2018, 2019, 2020 Highly Cited Researchers List (ranking of top 1% cited researchers).

== Research ==
Her research lab focused on protein translocations across lysosomal membranes, identifying regulator proteins like glial fibrillary acidic protein or the mTORC2-Akt-Phlpp axis. In collaboration with neuroscientist David Sulzer of Columbia University Medical Center, she published early evidence of altered CMA in Parkinson's disease. and Huntington Disease. Cuervo's research team also identified LRRK2, a protein enzyme that becomes mutated in Parkinson's disease, disrupts the process of translocation across lysosomal membranes. The work of her group expanded later to tauopathies, including Alzheimer's Disease, where they found that the pathogenic variants of tau exert an inhibitory effect on CMA and that genetic and pharmacological upregulation of CMA in mouse models of tauopathies reduces pathology, preserves memory and learning and ameliorates disease progression.

Beyond the central nervous system, her group has undertaken a systematic approach to explore changes in CMA with age at the systemic level and linked those changes to different age-related diseases. They identified the circadian nature of CMA and sex-specific changes in CMA with age in most organs. They demonstrate that CMA contributes to regulation of metabolic cellular processes related to glucose and lipid metabolism, DNA repair and cell cycle, and cell activation and differentiation. Cuervo's group has demonstrated malfunctioning of autophagy in neurodegenerative diseases, age-related sarcopenia, atherosclerosis, immune senescence, eye disorders, and in cancer.

As part of Cuervo's interest on the selectivity of autophagy, her group co-discovered with Mark Czaja and Rajat Sign the process of lipophagy, which selectively mobilizes lipid droplets through autophagy, and with Laura Santambrogio co-discovered endosomal microautophagy (e-MI), a selective mechanism for internalization of proteins into late endosomes/multivesicular bodies. Later Cuervo's group showed that e-MI cross-talks with CMA and that, as it is the case for CMA, eMI activity also declines with age.

== Recognition ==
Cuervo and her team have received numerous awards including the P. Benson Award, Keith Porter Fellow, Nathan Shock Memorial Award, Vincent Cristofalo Award in Aging, Bennett J. Cohen, Marshall Horwitz Prize, the Saul Korey Prize in Translational Medicine, the Juan Negrin Award on Physiology, the Spirit of Achievement Award, the SFRR-E Annual Award and the Howard Taylor Ricketts Prize. She has delivered prominent lectures such as the Robert R. Konh, the NIH Director’s, the Roy Walford, the Feodor Lynen, the Margaret Pittman, the IUBMB, the David H. Murdoxk, the Gerry Aurbach , the SEBBM L’Oreal-UNESCO for Women in Science, the Ronal Kohn, and the Harvey Lecture. She also received three times the LaDonne Schulman Teaching Award . In 2023, Cuervo was awarded Doctor Honoris Causa from the University of Buenos Aires. She was elected to the National Academy of Sciences in 2019.

== Personal life ==
Cuervo's husband was Dr. Fernando Macian, an immunologist at Albert Einstein College of Medicine, who sadly passed away in 2023. Cuervo and Macian were together since they met first year of Medical School in a research lab and continue collaborating scientifically through the years.
