= Thomas Nyfenger =

American flutist (1936–1990)

- Born: Thomas Daniel Nyfenger; October 6, 1936; Cleveland, Ohio
- Died: June 12, 1990 (aged 53) Guilford, Connecticut
- Genre: Classical
- Occupations: Musician, professor
- Instruments: Flute, piccolo

Thomas Daniel Nyfenger (October 6, 1936 – June 12, 1990) was an American flutist and teacher known for his "intense and caring emotion for the flute" and described as “a thorough professional who programs interesting music and is not above having a good time while playing it.” He taught at the Yale School of Music, played piccolo for the Indianapolis Symphony Orchestra, and held many part-time playing and teaching positions throughout his career.

== Life and career ==
Thomas Nyfenger was born in 1936 in Cleveland, Ohio. He began his flute studies during his senior year of high school under the instruction of Maurice Sharp, and went on to earn his bachelor's degree, Master's degree, and Artist Diploma from the Cleveland Institute of Music.

For two years, between 1961 and 1963, Thomas Nyfenger performed as solo piccoloist with the Indianapolis Symphony. He then moved to New York City and maintained a steady career as a freelance musician for four years until 1967. Among these engagements were performances with the Aeolian Chamber Players, the New York Chamber Symphony of the 92nd Street Y, the New York City Ballet Orchestra, the New York Woodwind Quintet, the Pro Arte Chamber Orchestra, and the Mostly Mozart and Casals Festival Orchestras.

In 1967, Nyfenger joined the flute faculty of the Yale School of Music and also served as the chairman of the wind department.

He held part-time teaching positions at the Manhattan School of Music, Mannes College, Queens College, Sarah Lawrence College, SUNY Purchase, and Vassar College.

Nyfenger presented master classes and guest recitals at several locations across the United States, including those in Boston, Massachusetts, Kansas City, Kansas, Mill Valley, California, New Haven, Connecticut, and many more.

Thomas Nyfenger died at the age of 53 on June 12, 1990. He committed suicide in his Guilford, Connecticut home after a long battle with chronic depression. The Thomas Daniel Nyfenger Prize is awarded annually by the Yale School of Music "to a student who has demonstrated the highest standard of excellence in woodwind playing".

== Pupils ==
Among his pupils are: Jonathan Baumgarten, former principal of the Mexico City Philharmonic; nationally acclaimed flutist and teacher Tadeu Coelho; Robert Dick, virtuoso improvisor, composer, teacher and performer; Aralee Dorough, retired principal flutist of the Houston Symphony Orchestra; Adrianne Greenbaum, nationally acclaimed klezmer flutist; Anne Janson, second flutist of the Vermont Symphony Orchestra; Karen Jones, principal flutist of the London Sinfonia and London Chamber Orchestra; Trudy Kane, former principal flute of the Metropolitan Opera, and retired Professor of flute at the University of Miami Frost School of Music; Ontario Philharmonic flutist Leslie Newman; San Francisco Symphony flutist Catherine Payne; Robin Peller, flutist with the Indianapolis Symphony Orchestra; Kathie Stewart, founding member and principal flutist for the Cleveland Baroque Orchestra; Alexa Still, professor of flute at Oberlin College former principal flutist of the New Zealand Symphony Orchestra; Linda Toote, principal flutist of the Boston Lyric Opera and faculty at the Boston Conservatory of Music; Richard Volet, principal flutist of the Victoria Symphony (Canada); Anne Lindblom Harrow, professor of piccolo and chamber music at the Eastman School of Music: Mary Posses, retired Associate Professor of music, University of Missouri-Kansas City Conservatory of Music and Dance; Claudia Anderson, principal flutist of the Wichita-Cedar Falls Symphony and performer with Zawa!; the late Philip Dikeman, former assistant principal flutist of the Detroit Symphony Orchestra, and former Associate Professor of Flute at the Blair School of Music at Vanderbilt University; Terri Sundberg, Professor of Flute at the University of North Texas College of Music in Denton, TX; Barbara Hopkins, Assistant Principal Flutist of the Hartford Symphony Orchestra; Sharon Wood Sparrow, retired Assistant Principal Flutist of the Detroit Symphony; Valerie Potter, Principal Flutist of the New Mexico Symphony Orchestra.

== Publications ==
In 1986, Thomas Nyfenger completed and self-published his book Music and the Flute.

In 2009, Beyond the Notes: Musical Thoughts and Analyses, was posthumously published through Nyfenger Holdings. It is a collection of Nyfenger's written thoughts which were found, compiled, and edited by Edward Joffe.
