= Themes & Improvisations on the Blues =

Live album by Leroy Jenkins
- Released: 1994
- Recorded: April 9, 1992
- Venue: Merkin Concert Hall New York City
- Genre: jazz, classical music
- Length: 60:40
- Label: Composers Recordings, Inc. CD 663

Leroy Jenkins chronology
Leroy Jenkins Live! (1993)	Themes & Improvisations on the Blues (1994)	Out of the Mist (1997)

Themes & Improvisations on the Blues is a live album by violinist / composer Leroy Jenkins. It was recorded in April 1992 at Merkin Concert Hall in New York City, and was released by Composers Recordings, Inc. in 1994. The album documents performances of four of Jenkins's compositions for ensembles of varying size. The violinist appears on two of the tracks.

== Background and music ==
In 1991, Jenkins approached Thomas Buckner, organizer of the Interpretation Series at New York City's Merkin Concert Hall, and proposed a project involving performances of four of Jenkins's compositions. A year later, an all-Jenkins concert titled "Retrospective and Beyond" was presented at Merkin, and was recorded.

"Themes & Improvisations on the Blues" was composed in 1986 and premiered by the Kronos Quartet at Carnegie Hall's Weill Recital Hall. It blends written and improvised material (the composer estimated that roughly thirty percent of the piece is improvised), and features blues-based thematic material. In some sections, one member of the group is given a number of bars in which to improvise, while the remainder of the musicians play fully-notated music.

"Panorama I" was composed in 1983, and again involves both fully-composed and improvised music. The composer stated that it was "designed to provide maximum opportunity for players interested in improvisation, with the written parts being used as 'fuel stops' for the improvised sections." Directions regarding improvisations were primarily verbal; for the recorded performance, Jenkins told the musicians to "make it kinky."

"Off Duty Dryad" was written in 1990 for string quintet and Jenkins's frequent collaborator, dancer Felicia Norton. The music, which bears some resemblance to Jenkins's dance-opera Mother of Three Sons, shows the influence of the composer's own experience as a performing violinist. The score features sections marked "free time," with no bar lines or notated rhythms, as well as passages with fully-notated unison rhythms but without specific pitches.

The original version of "Monkey on the Dragon" was a dance score commissioned by the 14th Street Dance Center for Felicia Norton, with choreography by Mark Dendy. The version heard on the recording, for violinist and chamber orchestra, was commissioned and premiered by the Pittsburgh New Music Ensemble, and was completed in 1990. Most of the improvisatory elements are assigned to the violin soloist; according to Jenkins, "the soloist is the monkey and the orchestra is the dragon."

== Reception ==
Professional ratings
Review scores
Source	Rating
AllMusic	4/5 stars
The Rolling Stone Jazz & Blues Album Guide	3.5/5 stars

In a review for AllMusic, Mark Allender wrote: "For a long time, Leroy Jenkins had only been known for his free jazz performances, with little to no attention to his composed work, when in 1992 the Soldier String Quartet and other musicians committed themselves to putting on a performance of Jenkins' compositions. The results are astounding... Most of Jenkins' compositional work can be described as a frame around which the musicians can improvise with simple thematic instructions... This is an exciting listen with much to stimulate the mind and ear."

In a New York Times article titled "5 Minutes That Will Make You Love String Quartets," Seth Colter Walls commented: "Some of the writing has a puckish air reminiscent of Neo-Classical Stravinsky, refracted through an American prism. When members of the quartet respond to Jenkins's invitation to improvise... their bent notes and dramatic glissandos echo the songful cries of Jenkins’s own playing."

== Track listing ==
All compositions by Leroy Jenkins.

1. "Themes & Improvisations on the Blues" - 18:31 - The Soldier String Quartet: David Soldier and Laura Seaton, violin; Ron Lawrence, viola; Mary Wooton, cello
2. "Panorama 1" - 13:31 - Leroy Jenkins, violin; Henry Threadgill, flute; Don Byron, clarinet; Marty Ehrlich, bass clarinet; Vincent Chancey, French horn
3. "Off Duty Dryad" - 13:04 - The Soldier String Quartet: David Soldier and Laura Seaton, violin; Ron Lawrence, viola; Mary Wooton, cello; with Lindsey Horner, bass
4. "Monkey on the Dragon" - 15:31 - Tania León, conductor; Leroy Jenkins, violin (solo); Henry Threadgill, flute; Don Byron, clarinet; Marty Ehrlich, bass clarinet; Janet Grice, bassoon; Frank Gordon, trumpet; Jeff Hoyer, trombone; Vincent Chancey, French horn; Myra Melford, piano; Thurman Barker, drums; David Soldier, Jane Henry, violin; Ron Lawrence, viola; Mary Wooton, cello; Lindsey Horner, bass
- Recorded April 9, 1992 at Merkin Concert Hall New York City
