= Robert Dick (flutist) =

American flutist (born 1950)

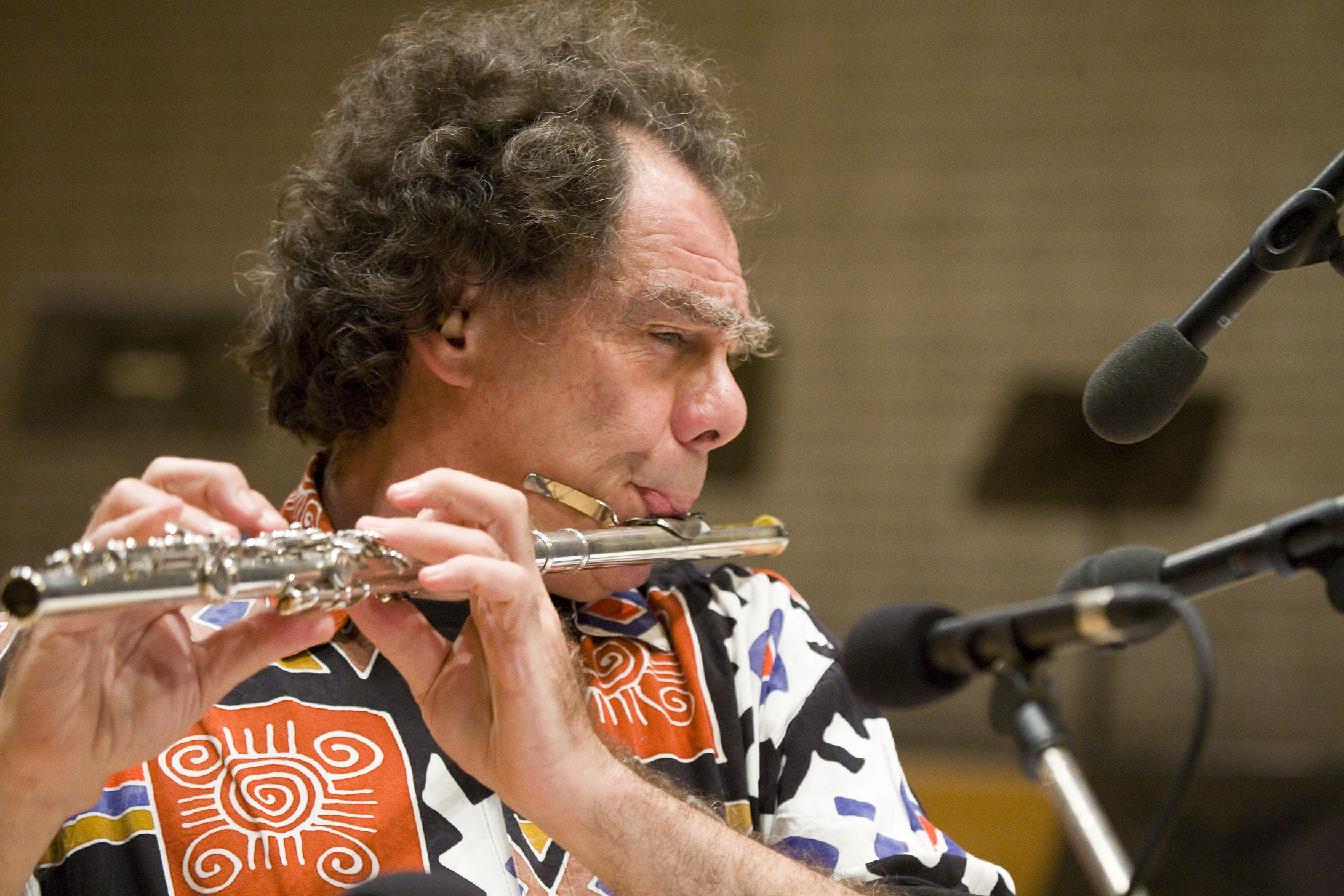

Background information
- Born: January 4, 1950 (age 76); New York City, New York
- Genres: free improvisation, new jazz, classical contemporary
- Occupations: flutist, composer, teacher, author
- Instruments: Flute, piccolo
- Years active: 1973-present
- Labels: New World, Tzadik, Enja, NEMU, Mulatta
- Website: www.robertdick.net

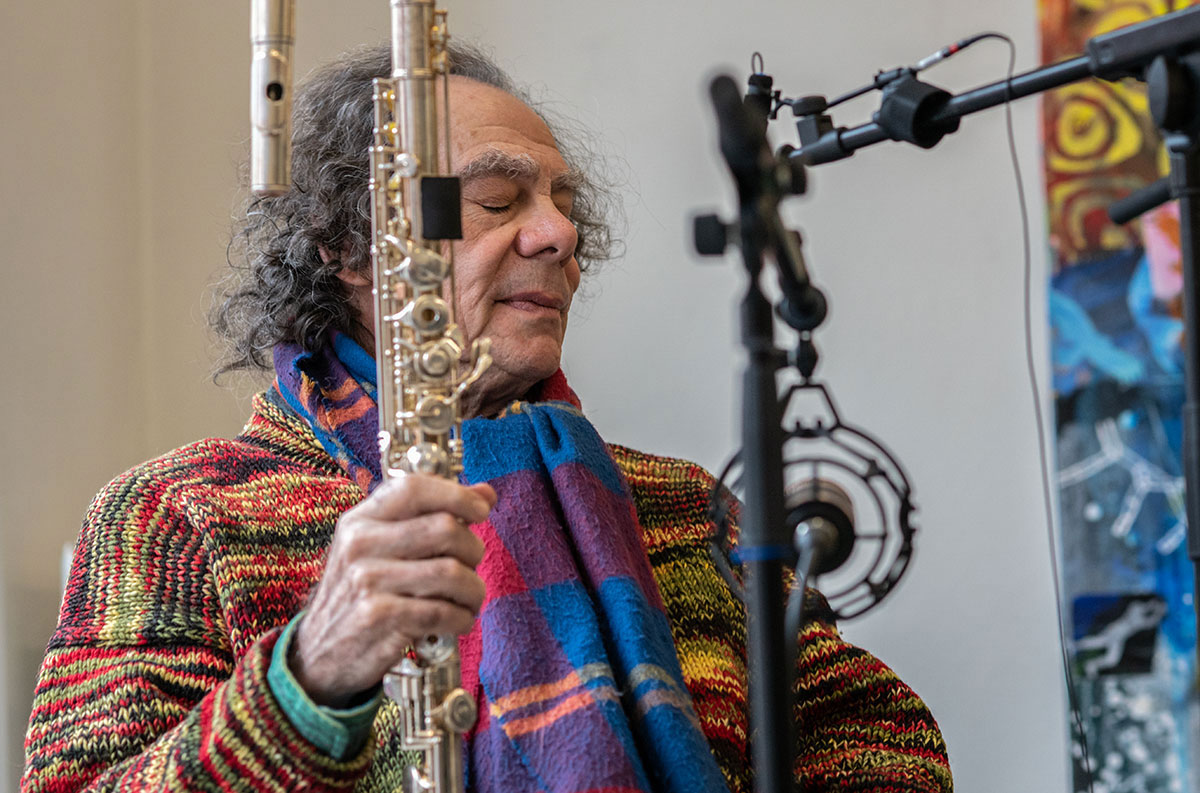
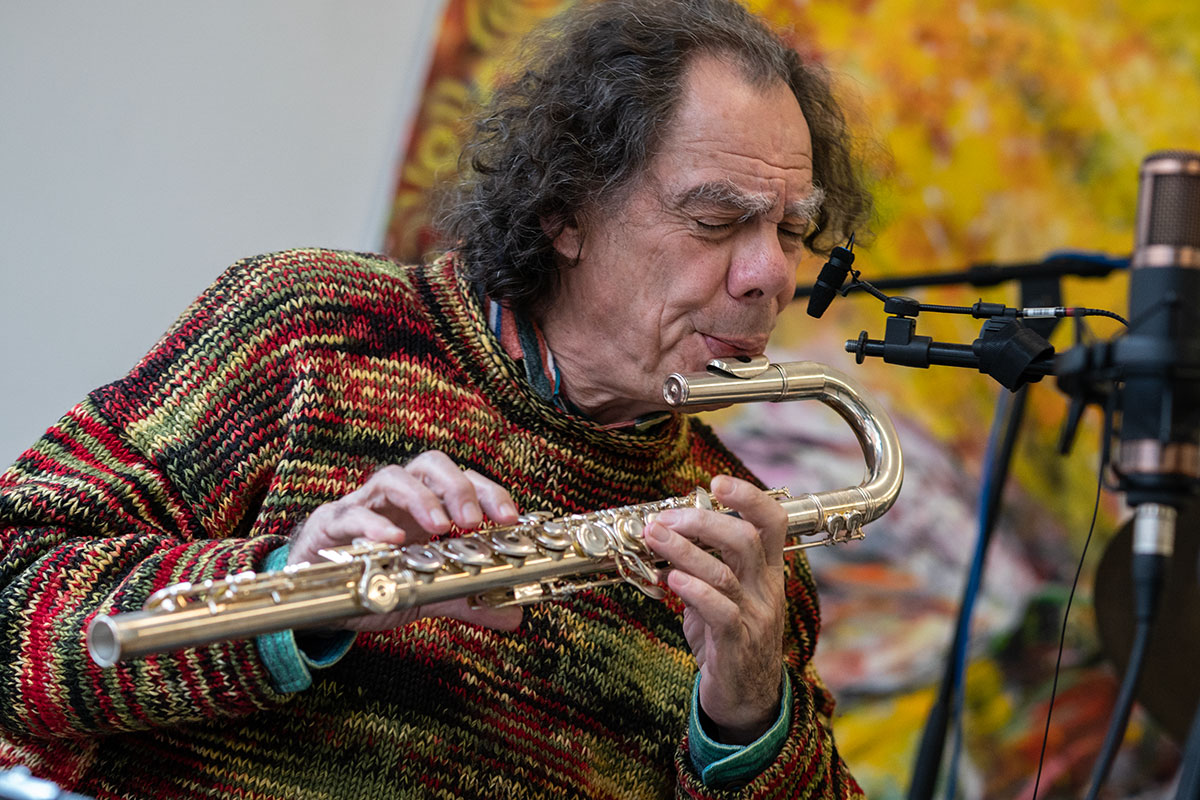
Denmark 2023

Robert Dick (born January 4, 1950) is a flutist, composer, teacher, inventor, and author.

His musical style is a mix of classical, world music, electronic and jazz. 2014, the National Flute Association awarded Dick its Lifetime Achievement Award. The New York Times said his “technical resources and imagination seem limitless" while JazzTimes called him “revolutionary.”

Dick invented the "glissando headjoint" a custom flute modification allowing the player to achieve effects similar to the whammy bar of an electric guitar.

== Early life and history ==
Robert Dick was born and raised in New York City. He began playing the flute in the fourth grade, after hearing the piccolo on the radio in the Top 40 hit “Rockin’ Robin". His primary teachers were Henry Zlotnik, James Pappoutsakis, Julius Baker and Thomas Nyfenger.

As a teenager, Dick wanted to become an orchestral flutist, and played first flute in the Senior Orchestra at the High School of Music and Art and also the New York All-City High School Orchestra. “Studies with him (Julius Baker) were geared toward becoming an orchestral player, and that was my dream at the time. But as I grew out of that dream, I realized that my training really hadn’t provided a look at music from the inside, which is what I needed—particularly the idea that music is generated from hearing within and recognizing what you are hearing.” He became a soloist and composer.

At Yale College, Dick earned a BA degree, and met Robert Morris, a composer and theorist, who mentored him as he wrote his first compositions. While at Yale, Dick wrote his first book: THE OTHER FLUTE: A Performance Manual of Contemporary Techniques, and then earned his master's degree in composition, studying with Morris as well as electronic music with Bulant Arel and Jacob Druckman.

While attending Yale's graduate school, Dick composed “Afterlight,” a flute piece that used multiphonics as its basis. “Afterlight” received a BMI Oliver Daniel Prize.

== Career ==
After leaving school in Spring 1973, Dick lived in New Haven, Connecticut until September 1977, when he moved to Buffalo, New York to join the contemporary music group, the Creative Associates. Dick was a member of the group until June 1980. While in New Haven, he wrote his second book Tone Development through Extended Technique and began to develop himself as an improviser and composer.

Dick spent six months in Paris from July - December 1978 working at I.R.C.A.M. (Institute of Research and Coordination, Acoustics and Music) developing his idea for a new flute mechanism. The first prototype was made by Albert Cooper in London in 1984. This design remains unfinished.

From Fall 1980 until Spring 1992, Dick lived in New York City, developing his compositions, improvisations and wrote Circular Breathing for the Flutist. In this period, he self-published The Revised Edition of THE OTHER FLUTE: A Performance Manual of Contemporary Technique and his later books, compositions and instructional recordings through his Multiple Breath Music Company. In 1986, he left the role of concert soloist in contemporary music to perform his own music and the music of composer-performer collaborators exclusively. Dick performed a recital of his own works as part of the New York Philharmonic’s Horizons 84 Festival at Avery Fisher Hall in 1984.

In May 1992, he moved to Switzerland for ten years, continuing his career as a composer-performer. He returned to the US in 2002, as Visiting assistant professor of Flute at the University of Iowa. In July 2003, he returned to New York City. Since July 2013, Dick has been dividing his time between New York City and Kassel, Germany, where his children Sebastian (born 2006) and Leonie (born 2008) live with their mother, composer-pianist Ursel Schlicht.

Dick's recitals today primarily consist of his compositions and improvisations, occasionally incorporating the influences of Paul Hindemith, Georg Philipp Telemann and Jimi Hendrix into his repertoire.

As an instructor, Dick created a method and practice of teaching for flutists that he documented in his books: Tone Development through Extended Techniques, and Circular Breathing for the Flutist and the two volumes of FLYING LESSONS: Six Contemporary Concert Etudes. He teaches masters classes at hundreds of international universities.

Dick is the inventor of the Glissando Headjoint, a trademarked telescoping flute mouthpiece which allows the flutist to slide and extend notes.

As a composer, Dick's work has been recognized by a Koussevitzky Foundation Commission, a Guggenheim Fellowship and two NEA Composers Fellowships, among many grants and commissions. Dick has composed a new work for the National Flute Association Young Artist Competition. He has recorded over 20 albums and appeared as a guest on many other recordings.

== Discography ==
=== As Leader ===
- Three Weeks in Cincinnati in December 2017 (New World 80789-2) Robert Dick performs the flute work of William Hellermann.
- Our Cells Know 2016 (Tzadik 4015) Solo improvisations on the contrabass flute.
- The Galilean Moons 2016 (NEMU 017) Robert Dick on flutes and Ursel Schlicht on piano.
- Flutes and Voices 2010 (Mutable Music17541-2) Robert Dick, flutes and piccolo and Thomas Buckner, baritone.
- Doh Tala 2008 (Epoch Music) Free improvisation by Robert Dick, Steve Baczkowski and Ravi Padmanabha.
- Photosphere 2006 (NEMU 002) Robert Dick and Ursel Schlicht are flute-piano duo.
- IS 2004 (Caliente 245 360 24-2) King Chubby are Robert Dick, flutes; Ed Bialek, samplers and keyboards; Will Ryan, percussion and handmade instruments; Mark Egan, electric bass; Michael D’Agostino, drums and percussion.
- Columns of Air 2003 (Future Tickle Music) Jaron Lanier, multiple instrumentalist, Robert Dick on flute with singer Alan Kushanon in two pieces.
- Vindonissa 2003 (ECM 1836) Violinist Paul Giger, flutist Robert Dick and drummer Satoshi Takeishi on an album released only in Europe.
- Other Times 2002 (KC1) King Chubby album
- The Twelve Fantasies for Flute Alone by G.P. Telemann 2001 (Callisto Records CLS0101, Italy) Disc 1: Robert Dick on flute and piccolo; Disc 2: Lorenzo Cavasanti on period instruments, traversi and recorders; Disc 3: Multimedia disc with scores, photos, interviews.
- Sic Bisquitus Disintegrat (That’s the Way the Cookie Crumbles) 2000 (Enja Records 9361-2, Germany) The A.D.D. Trio is Robert Dick, flutes; Christy Doran, electric guitar and delay devices; and Steve Argüelles, drums.
- GUDIRA 1999 (Nuscope Records 1003, USA) Gudira is Robert Dick, flutes, piccolo; Barry Guy, contabass; Randy Raine-Reusch, Asian Zithers, Asian and Middle Eastern winds, percussion.
- In Full Armour 1998 (UNIT Records UTR 4107, Switzerland) OSCURA LUMINOSA features Robert Dick, flutes; Petia Kaufmann, harpsichord; Dorothea Schürch, vocals; Conrad Steinmann, recorders; Alfred Zimmerlin, cello.
- Jazz Standards on Mars 1997 (Enja Records 9327-2, Germany) Robert Dick with Dave Soldier and the Soldier String Quartet plus rhythm section guests.
- Potion 1997 (Les Disques Victo 053, Canada) New Winds are Robert Dick, flutes; Herb Robertson, trumpet; Ned Rothenberg, alto sax, bass clarinet and clarinet.
- Aurealis 1997 (Les Disques Victo 052, Canada) As Trio Aurealis, Robert Dick plays flutes; John Wolf Brennan piano; and Daniele Patumi, contrabass.
- Irrefragable Dreams 1996 (Random Acoustics, Germany 018) Flutist Robert Dick with violinist Mari Kimura
- Instinct 1996 (Bellaphon, Germany LR 45104) The ADD Trio.
- Worlds of IF 1995 (Leo Records, England CD LR 224) Robert Dick with flutes, piccolo, and a duet with Ned Rothenberg played various woodwind instruments
- Digging it Harder From Afar 1994 (Les Disques Victo, Canada cd 028) New Winds perform
- Third Stone from the Sun 1993 (New World/CounterCurrents, U.S.A. #80435-2) with Dave Soldier and the Soldier String Quartet
- Steel and Bamboo 1993 (O.O. Discs, U.S.A. #12) The duo of Robert Dick, flute, and Steve Gorn, Indian bansuri bamboo flute.
- Tambastics 1992 (Music and Arts Programs of America, CD 704) The ensemble Tambastics which features Robert Dick, flutes; Denman Maroney, piano; Mark Dresser, bass; and Jerry Hemingway, drums.
- Venturi Shadows 1991 (O.O.Discs, U.S.A. #7) Robert Dick, flutes, with Ned Rothenberg, shakuhachi; Steve Gorn, bansuri; Neil B. Rolnick, electronics and Mary Kay Fink, flute.
- Ladder 5 of Escape 1991 (Attacca Records, Netherlands #9158 - Robert Dick on flutes.
- Traction 1991 (Sound Aspects, Germany #044) New Winds perform.
- The Cliff 1989 (Sound Aspects, Germany #025) New Winds performs.
- The Other Flute 1986 (GM Recordings, U.S.A. #2013 - CD) Robert Dick on flutes.
- Whispers and Landings 1981 (Lumina Records, U.S.A., #007) Cassette-only recording of Robert Dick on flutes.

=== Original compositions on compilations ===
- "everyone@universe.existence" and "Sliding Life Blues" American Modern Ensemble - Mavericks 2015 (AMR 2041)
- "On Simak Pond" 60x60 2008 (Vox Novus Productions)
- "Delayed Reason" Irving Stone Memorial Concert 2004 (Tzadik 7611-5)
- Molecular Motion" Subtropics, Vol. 1 - Breath 2000 (Elegua Records 005)
- "Untitled Improvisation" Radio Days 1999 (WIM Werkstatt für Improvisierte Musik) Robert Dick, Alfred Zimmerlin, Jochen Bohnes, Günter Miller
- "Afterlight" Flute Possibilities 1979 (CRI 400)

=== Performances of other composers ===
- Source 2015 (Liminal Music) SLM Ensemble music by Sarah Weaver, Mark Dresser
- Dark Forces 2011 (Creative Sources CS 195) Robert Dick's bass flute improvisations mixed into music
- Almost New York 2010 (Pogus 21057-2) For contrabass flute and electronics
- "Shakugo" 2010 (Motema MTM 31) For also flute and kugo music by Robert Lombardo
- Live from Roulette 2008 (DiPietro Editions) Music of Rocco DiPietro
- Third Eye Orchestra 2008 (Innova 225) Music by Hans Tammen
- "Little Andre" Dave Soldier: Chamber Music 2007 Solo bass flute by Dave Soldier
- The Secret Miracle Fountain 2006 (Locust 76) Robert Dick's sampled and processed recordings are mixed into music
- "Plum/Dream Sequence II" Solos, Solo Works of Daniel Asia 2005 (Summit DCD 422) Music by Daniel Asia
- "Music for Berlin" Celestial Voices 1998 (OO Discs 42) For Flute and piano by Orlando Jacinto Garcia
- "Tchong" Living Tones 1995 (OO Discs 24) For bass flute and daegum by Jin Hi Kim
- Time Fragments 1994 (Enja 8076-2) The Klaus König Orchestra
- "A Breaking of Vessels, Becoming Song" Musical Elements 10th Anniversary Recording 1987 (CRI Records digital re-release 2016) For flute solo and chamber ensemble by Malcolm Goldstein
- The Desert Music 1985 (Nonesuch 79101) Robert Dick is principal flutist of the Brooklyn Philharmonic Orchestra music by Steve Reich
- "Blowing" Electricity 1984 (1750 Arch Records and OO Discs 8 re-release 1992) Solo flutist music by Neil Rolnick
- "Conspiracies" Bresnick/Mumford (1982) For solo flute and four other flutists music by Martin Bresnick
- "Thirteen Ways of Looking at a Blackbird" The Face on the Barroom Floor/Thirteen Ways of Looking at a Blackbird 1982 (CRI 442) For soprano, flute, percussion and piano music by Lukas Foss
- "Archery" Archery 1981 (Parachute Records re-released 1997 on Game Pieces Tzadik 7316) For large ensemble music by John Zorn
- "Tenzone" Flute Possibilities 1979 (CRI 400) For two flutes and piano music by Chester Biscardi

=== Flute Instruction ===
- 2006–present City University of New York Graduate Center – Adjunct Faculty
- 2003–present Adjunct Instructor of Flute, New York University
- 2003-2006 Adjunct Instructor of Flute, Aaron Copland School of Music, Queens College, City University of New York
- 2002-2003 Visiting assistant professor of Flute, University of Iowa
- 1990-1992 Aaron Copland School of Music, Queens College, City University of New York - Adjunct Faculty
- 1990-1992 New York University, Adjunct Faculty
- 1988-1990 Mason Gross School of the Arts, Rutgers University, Visiting professor of Flute
- 1988-1988 State University of New York at Stony Brook, Visiting professor of Flute
- 1978-1979 Brock University, St. Catharines, Ontario, Canada, Adjunct Faculty

=== Orchestral Position ===
- 1982-1985 Principal Flutist, Brooklyn Philharmonic Orchestra, Lukas Foss, Music Director
- 1980-1982 Principal Flutist for the Brooklyn Philharmonic’s “Meet the Moderns” Series
- 1975-1977 Piccolo, New Haven Symphony

=== Professional Affiliations ===
- 2009-2011 Board of Directors, New York Flute Club
- 2007-2009 Board of Directors, National Flute Association (NFA)
- 2002-2010 Member, Contemporary Music Advisory and Long Range Planning Committees; Publications Review Board, National Flute Association
- 1985-2001 Member, Board of Advisers, Flute Talk Magazine
- 1986-1989 Chair, Contemporary Music Advisory Committee, National Flute Association
- 1986-1988 Music Panelist, New York State Council on the Arts
- 1986-1987 Board of Directors, National Flute Association
- 1984-1987 Member, Repertoire Committee, Composers’ Forum, New York
- 1976–present Member, National Flute Association
