= William Hooker =

William Hooker may refer to:

- William Hooker (musician) (born 1946), American jazz drummer and composer
- William Jackson Hooker (1785–1865), English botanist and botanical illustrator
- William Hooker (botanical illustrator) (1779–1832), British botanical illustrator
- William Dawson Hooker (1816–1840), British physician and botanist
- William Hooker (cricketer) (1796–1867), English cricketer
