= Jonathan Kane =

American musician and composer (born 1956)

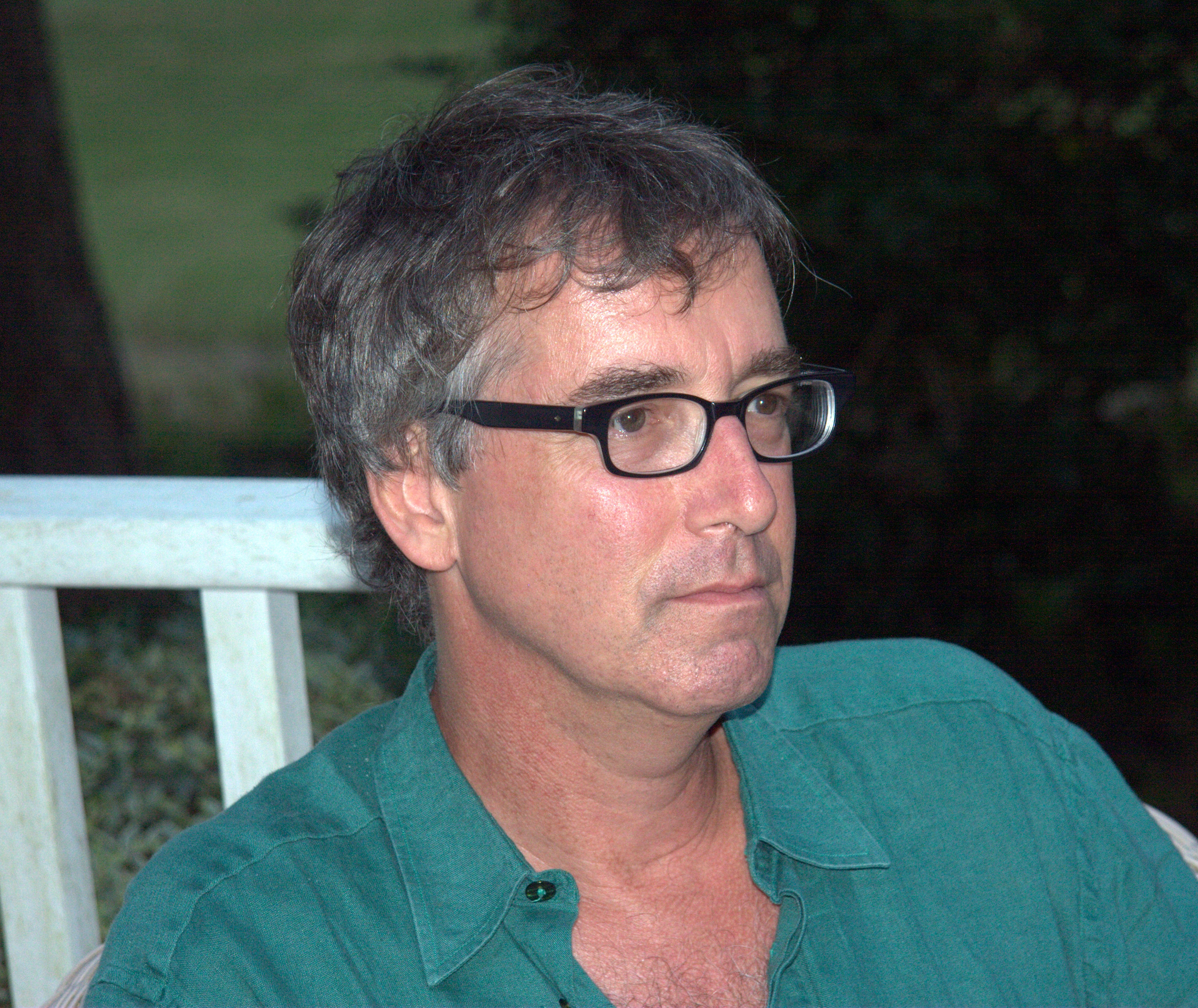
- Kane in 2013

Background information
- Born: November 4, 1956 (age 69); New York City, New York, United States
- Genres: Experimental rock; minimal; blues rock; no wave
- Occupation(s): Musician, composer
- Instrument(s): Drums, guitar, bass
- Member of: Jonathan Kane's February
- Formerly of: Swans

Jonathan Kane (born November 4, 1956) is an American musician and composer. Coming out of New York's Downtown No Wave music scene of the early 1980s, Kane is known for his work with minimalist composers La Monte Young and Rhys Chatham, and was a founding member of The New York City based band, Swans. He also leads his own minimalist blues band called Jonathan Kane's February.

Kane began his professional career while in high school in 1974. Along with his brother, harmonica player Anthony Kane, they formed the Kane Brothers Blues Band. They worked at east coast US clubs and opened concerts for James Cotton, Willie Dixon, Dr. John, Koko Taylor, and Muddy Waters, amongst others.

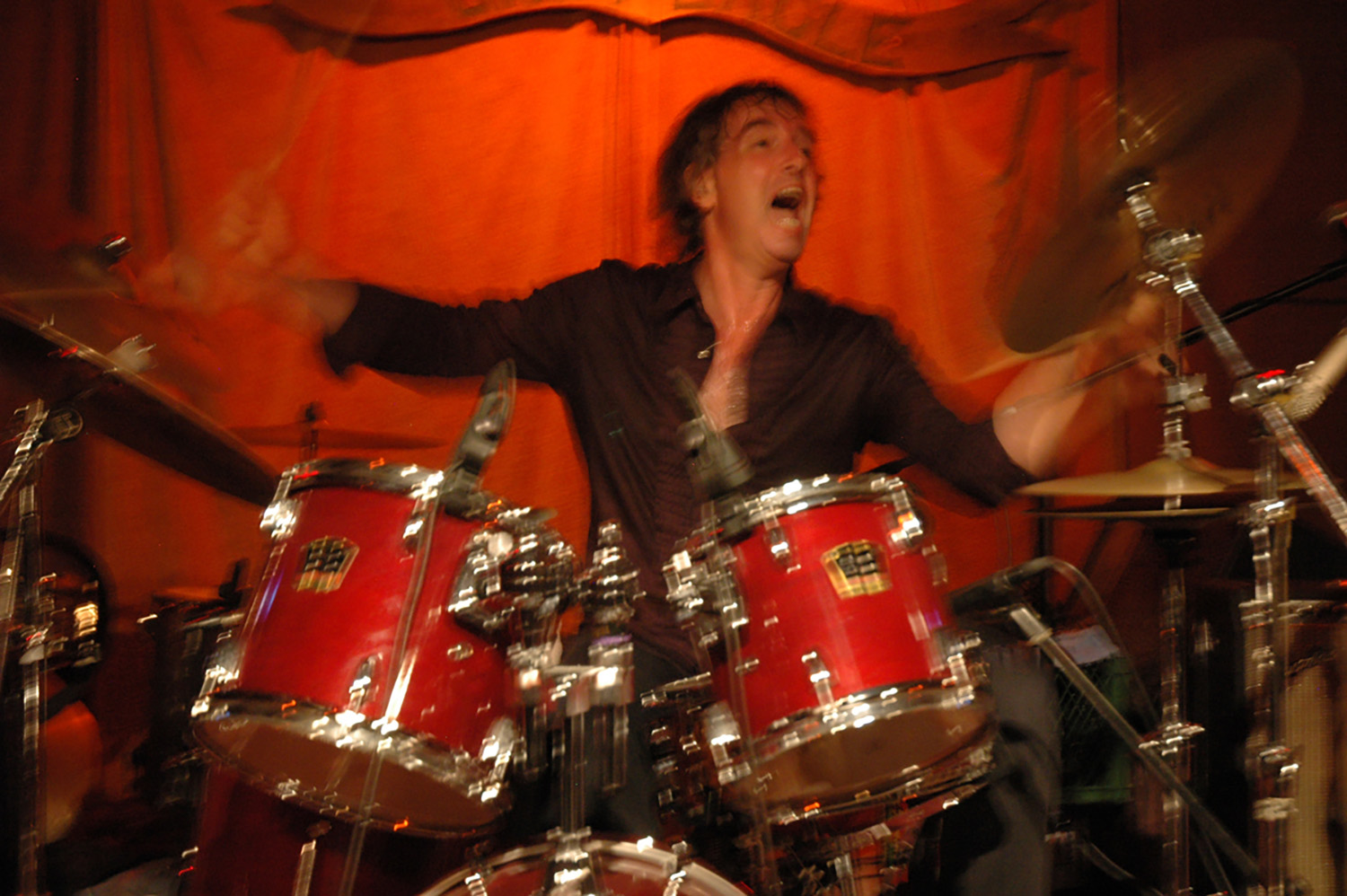
Kane playing drums at the Transfiguration Festival, Asheville, North Carolina, in 2009

Other groups and artists Kane has toured and recorded with includes Dave Soldier, The Kropotkins, Gary Lucas, Transmission, Elliott Sharp, Soldier String Quartet, John Zorn, Jean-Francois Pauvros, Jac Berrocal, and Tony Hymas. He also composed music for choreographers Bebe Miller, Lisa Fox and Wally Cardona.

Kane has released two solo albums, February (2004) and Jet Ear Party (2009), and also an EP, The Little Drummer Boy (2007).

== Timeline ==
- 1974–1977 – Kane Bros. Blues Band
- 1977–1979 – Attends Berklee College of Music in Boston, Massachusetts
- 1980–1981 – NYC Post-punk band Circus Mort with future Swans front man Michael Gira
- 1981–1983 – Forms Swans with Michael Gira, forms Transmission with Daniel Galliduani, tours USA with Swans/Sonic Youth Savage Blunder Tours, tours with Rhys Chatham on "Kitchen Tour USA 1"
- 1984–1988 – Composes and arranges for choreographers Bebe Miller and Lisa Fox
- 1988–2009 – World premier in 1988 of Rhys Chatham's symphony for 100 electric guitars An Angel Moves Too Fast To See that features Kane as the only drummer. Tours worldwide.
- 19912000 – Member of La Monte Young's Forever Bad Blues Band performing Young's 3+ hour piece Young's Dorian Blues in G. Tours worldwide.
- 1994–present Forms The Kropotkins with Dave Soldier, Moe Tucker, Lorette Velvette and Charles Burnham.
- 2005–present – Forms Jonathan Kane's February, tours USA and Europe, releases 5 records/cds on Table of the Elements label and Issue Project Room Editions. Band members have included Igor Cubrilovic (producer), Peg Simone, Jon Crider, David Bicknell, Adam Wills (Bear In Heaven), Eric Eble, Ernie Brooks (Modern Lovers), David Daniell, and Paul Duncan.
- 2010–present – Joins X Patsy's with artists Robert Longo, Jon Kessler and actress Barbara Sukowa. Tours Europe
- 2012–present – Forms Soldier Kane with Dave Soldier

== Personal life ==
Jonathan Kane is the son of American photographer Art Kane, and has two brothers, Anthony and Nikolas. In 1984, he married poet and lyricist Holly Anderson, and the couple's daughter, Lucy, was born in 1993. His wife died in 2017, from cancer linked to her work as a volunteer following the 9/11 terrorist attacks in New York.
