= Thai Elephant Orchestra =

Thai musical ensemble of elephants

The Thai Elephant Orchestra is a musical ensemble consisting of as many as fourteen Thai elephants near Lampang in Northern Thailand. The elephants play music, essentially as conducted improvisations, on specially designed heavy-duty musical instruments. The orchestra was co-created by elephant conservationist Richard Lair of the National Elephant Institute and the American musical artist and neuroscientist Dave Soldier. They have released three CDs on the Mulatta Records label with an orchestra ranging in size from six to fourteen elephants. The orchestra currently performs for visitors at the center. It was created as part of the center's effort to provide a place for former working animals. Their music has been described as "genuine" by some music critics.

== Background ==
It has been noted since ancient times that elephants seem to have an affinity for music. Performing circus elephants commonly follow musical cues, and early American circuses such as Adam Forepaugh and Barnum & Bailey even featured "elephant bands." In the 1950s, German evolutionary biologist Bernard Rensch found that elephants can distinguish 12 tones on the musical scale and remember simple melodies, even when played on different instruments at various pitches, timbres, and meters.

Three albums of music created by elephant musicians was conceived by New York-based musical artist Dave Soldier (a.k.a. David Sulzer, PhD) and elephant expert Richard Lair, who works at the Thai Elephant Conservation Center in Lampang. Traditional Thai music is a genre familiar to the elephants, so they chose Thai music scales with a few blues notes. According to Lair, many of the elephants took to their assignment "with gusto".

== Music ==
The Thai Elephant Orchestra primarily uses the Lanna Thai five-note scale, and most instruments are heavy-duty versions of traditional Thai musical instruments; additional instruments include drums and harmonica.

Their musical works are of two general types. The first type, which are on the recordings, features the elephants individually improvising on the instruments with the only human interaction being cues as to when to start and stop. The other type is compositional and requires mahouts to teach or train the elephants to perform human tunes as a hocket, with each elephant playing an individual note on angalungs.

Discography

- (2002) – The Thai Elephant Orchestra
- (2005) – Elephonic Rhapsodies
- (2011) – Water Music
- (2025) – Symphony no. 1, "The Ganesha"
