= David First =

American composer

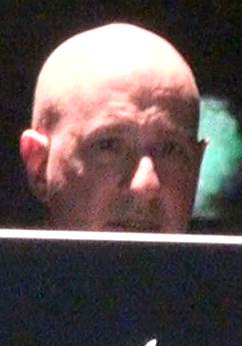
David First.

David First (born David Hirsch, August 20, 1953) is an American composer and guitarist. His music most often deals with drones and interference beats, the latter aligning his music with that of Alvin Lucier. He has led the World Casio Quartet, Joy Buzzers, and The Notekillers which originally existed from 1977–81 and reformed in 2004. He is also a member of Matter Waves, which includes Kid Millions on drums and Bernard Gann on bass, and the music collective New Party Systems.

== Career ==
David First played with Cecil Taylor at Carnegie Hall. He studied guitar and jazz theory with Dennis Sandole. He also audited analog & computer synthesis classes at Princeton University. He befriended a grad-student there who allowed him unlimited access to the largely abandoned electronic music studio. He composed his first works in the medium there in after-hours sessions.

His albums include 1991's Resolver, instrumental pieces influenced by minimalism and 2002's relatively pop-oriented Universary, which consists of "songs and drones". More recent releases include 2010's We're Here to Help (Prophase Records) by The Notekillers and Privacy Issues, a 3-CD set of droneworks on the XI label.

In 1995 First, along with visual artist Patricia Smith created an opera, The Manhattan Book of the Dead, which was presented at La MaMa Experimental Theatre Club's Annex Theater in 1995 and The Washaus in Potsdam, Germany in 1996.

First received a 2001 Foundation for Contemporary Arts Grants to Artists Award.

In January 2012, the music collective, New Party Systems, an ensemble containing First, released a song First wrote (C2011 Silent Graph Music ASCAP), "We Are" –– an anthem for the 99%, with a video by director, Toni Comas.
