= Todd Reynolds (musician) =

American musician

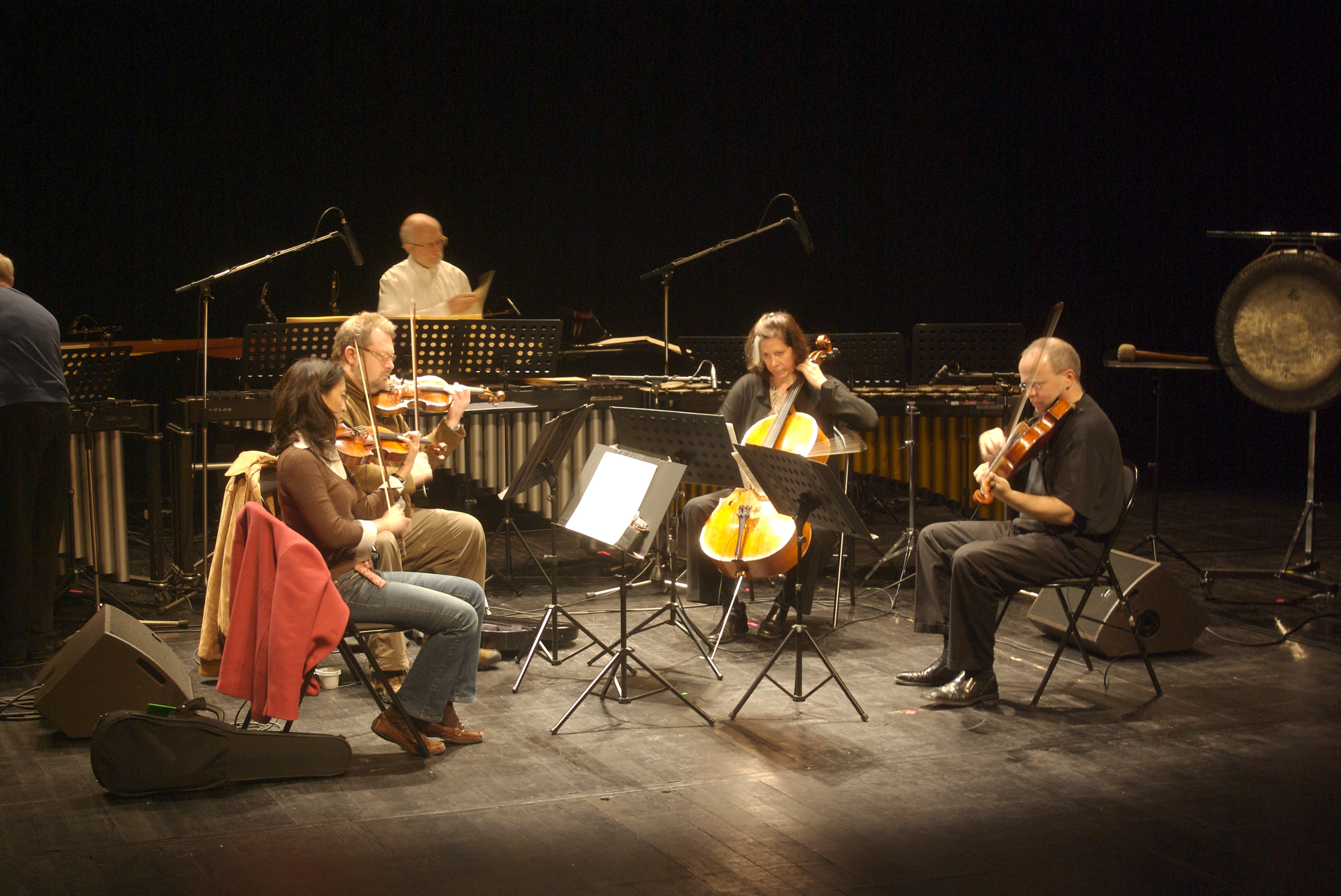
The Steve Reich Ensemble playing Steve Reich's Different Trains. From left to right, Liz Lim-Dutton (violin), Todd Reynolds (violin), Jeanne LeBlanc (cello), Scott Rawls (viola)

Todd Reynolds is an American violinist, composer, and conductor whose career has focused on electronic music.

== Career ==
Reynolds was a student of Jascha Heifetz and the former principal of the Rochester Philharmonic Orchestra. He later became a member of Bang on a Can and Steve Reich and Musicians. He co-founded Ethel, a string quartet whose format fused elements of avant-garde and experimental music with interactive electronics.

Reynolds has performed with Anthony Braxton, John Cale, Steve Coleman, Yo-Yo Ma, and Todd Rundgren, among others. He also produces and curates events centered on his work, including Nuove Uova and Still Life With Microphone, where he collaborated with Michael Lowenstern and R. Luke DuBois.

He released his debut artist album, the double LP Outerborough, on Innova Recordings in 2011. It includes one disc of music composed and performed by Reynolds and a second disc of music composed by Michael Gordon, Nick Zammuto, David T. Little, Ken Thompson, Paula Matthusen, and David Lang.

== Discography ==
- Outerborough (Innova Recordings, 2011)

With Uri Caine

- The Goldberg Variations (Winter & Winter, 2000)
