= Press Color =

Studio album by Lizzy Mercier Descloux
- Released: February 1979
- Recorded: 1979
- Studio: Blank Tapes Studios NYC
- Genres: No wave; post-punk; mutant disco
- Length: 22:46
- Label: ZE
- Producer: Michel Esteban

Lizzy Mercier Descloux chronology
Press Color (1979)	Mambo Nassau (1981)

Professional ratings
Review scores
Source	Rating
AllMusic	4/5 stars
Far Out	4.5/5 stars
Pitchfork	8.2/10
PopMatters	9/10
Record Collector	4/5 stars

Press Color is the debut album of French singer Lizzy Mercier Descloux, released in 1979 on ZE Records and produced by Michel Esteban.

== History ==
Press Color was Descloux's solo debut following the 1978 release of the live Rosa Vertov EP by Descloux's short-lived no wave band Rosa Yemen, an early ZE Records signing. The album blends influence from disco, funk, and film scores with no wave and punk elements. There are covers of soundtrack pieces by Lalo Schifrin ("Mission Impossible" and "Jim on the Move"), Arthur Brown's "Fire" (reimagined as a disco song) and Peggy Lee's "Fever" (reimagined as "Tumor").

Upon release, it received little promotion and did not fare well commercially, but it inspired positive reviews in Europe and caught the interest of Chris Blackwell of Island Records, who would help facilitate the recording of Descloux's second album Mambo Nassau (1981) at Compass Point Studios.

In 2003, it was rereleased with bonus material, including the 1978 Rosa Vertov EP.

== Reception ==
AllMusic described it as "an ambitious and stylistically diverse set that merged cool dance grooves with harsh, minimal guitar runs and unusual harmonies". PopMatters called it "a quintessential record of the post-punk era", adding that "thanks to its innumerable idiosyncrasies, Press Color remains vital and fresh, but also woefully under-appreciated". Uncut called the album "archetypal No Wave disco: all bubblegum-free-jazz-groove". Far Out stated that the album "tells the story of an artist as comfortable with avant-garde experimentation as funky and danceable disco-inspired anthems", and called it "one of the greatest no wave and post-punk records of the 1970s". Pitchfork called it "a vivid curio and cool personality splatter rather than a cultural landmark".

== Track listing ==
All songs written by Lizzy Mercier Descloux unless otherwise noted. The song "Tumor" is more commonly known as "Fever," with the word "fever" replaced by "tumor" in this version's lyrics.

=== Original release ===
Side One

1. "Jim on the Move" (Lalo Schifrin) – 2:29
2. "Aya Mood 3.5" – 2:50
3. "Torso Corso" – 1:48
4. "Wawa" – 2:18

Side Two

5. "Fire" (Arthur Brown) – 5:11
6. "Mission Impossible" (Schifrin) – 2:35
7. "No Golden Throat" – 2:38
8. "Tumor" (Eddie Cooley, John Davenport) – 2:57

=== 2003 reissue ===
1. "Fire" (Brown) – 5:11
2. "Torso Corso" 1:48
3. "Mission Impossible" (Schifrin) – 2:35
4. "No Golden Throat" – 2:38
5. "Jim on the Move" – (Schifrin) 2:29
6. "Wawa" – 2:18
7. "Tumor" (Cooley, Davenport) – 2:57
8. "Aya Mood" – 2:50
9. "Mission Impossible 2.0" (Schifrin) – 2:20
10. "Rosa Vertov" (Descloux, D.J. Barnes) – 1:43
11. "Decryptated" (Descloux, Barnes) – 1:20
12. "Herpes Simplex" (Descloux, Barnes) – 2:03
13. "Lacrosse Baron Bic"(Descloux, Barnes) – 1:36
14. "Tso Xin Yu Xin" (Descloux, Barnes) –1:20
15. "Nina Con Un Tercer Ojo" (Descloux, Barnes) – 0:58
16. "Birdy Num-num" – 3:32
17. "Hard Boiled Babe" – 4:28
18. "Morning High" (Rimbaud /Descloux, Patti Smith) – 3:04
- Tracks 10–15 are originally from the 1978 Rosa Yemen EP Rosa Vertov.
- Tracks 16–18 are previously unreleased bonus tracks.

== Personnel ==
- Lizzy Mercier Descloux – lead vocals, guitar, bass, percussion
- D.J. Barnes – guitar, bass, percussion, backing vocals
- Erik Elliasson – guitar, bass, keyboards, drums on "Wawa"
- Jimmy Young – drums, percussion
- Michel Esteban – executive producer

Guests on "Fire"

- Jack Cavari – guitars
- Ken Smith – bass
- Bud Maltin – saxophone
- Chris Wiltshire, Mary-Jo Kaplan, Ramona Brooks – backing vocals
- Victoria – percussion
- Allen Wentz – synthesizer, sequencer
- Tom Savarese - mixing

Guest on "Mission Impossible"

- Allen Wentz – synthesizer, sequencer

Guest on "Tumour"

- John Rome – guitars, backing vocals

Recorded by Bob Blank & Joe Arlotta at Blank Tapes Studio, NYC February 1979
Arranged, produced & mixed by Banes, Elliasson, Mercier Descloux, except "Fire" Mixed by Tom Savarese

=== Design ===
Art Cover Design by Michel Esteban Photos by Seth Tillet
