= Mambo Nassau =

Studio album by Lizzy Mercier Descloux
- Released: 1981
- Recorded: 1980, Compass Point Studios, Nassau, Bahamas (Island Records studios)
- Genre: No wave; mutant disco; dance-punk
- Length: 30:14
- Label: ZE
- Producer: Michel Esteban

Lizzy Mercier Descloux chronology
Press Color (1979)	Mambo Nassau (1981)	Lizzy Mercier Descloux (1984)

Alternative cover

Professional ratings
Review scores
Source	Rating
AllMusic	4.5/5 stars
Artist Direct	4/5 stars

Mambo Nassau is the second studio album by French singer Lizzy Mercier Descloux. It was released on ZE Records in 1981 and recorded at the Compass Point Studios in Nassau, Bahamas.

== Track listing ==
All songs written by Lizzy Mercier Descloux unless otherwise noted.

2003 Reissue
No.	Title	Writer(s)	Music	Length
1.	"Lady O K'pele"		Wally Badarou	2:28
2.	"Room Mate"		& Yann Le ker	2:44
3.	"Sports Spootnicks"		& Yann Le ker	4:21
4.	"Payola"			4:22
5.	"Milk Sheik"		Nino Rota; arrangemented by Wally Badarou	0:50
6.	"Funky Stuff"	Kool & the Gang	Kool & the Gang	4:10
7.	"Slipped Disc"		Phillipe Le Mongne	3:40
8.	"It's You Sort Of"		Yann Le ker, Phillipe Le Mongne	2:17
9.	"Bim Bam Boum"		& Yann Le ker	3:08
10.	"Five Troubles Mambo"		& Wally Badarou	2:14

BONUS TRACKS
No.	Title	Writer(s)	Music	Length
11.	"Les Baisers d'Amants"			3:52
12.	"Maïta"			3:14
13.	"Mister Soweto"			2:16
14.	"Sun Is Shining"	Bob Marley	Bob Marley	2:49
15.	"Corpo Molli, Pau Duro"		& Michel Bassignani	2:40
16.	"Don't You Try To Stop Me"		Mike McVoy	6:35

== Personnel ==
=== Sound ===
The original sound recording was made by Michel Esteban in 1980, 1982, 2003 and by Lizzy Mercier Descloux in 1995
It was selected by Lizzy Mercier Descloux and Michel Esteban
Produced by Michel Esteban P & © ZE records 2003 Original analogue master tapes digitally transferred at 24 bits resolution by Studios: Source & Translab, Paris.
It was mastered to 16 bits for CD by Charlus de La Salle at South Factory Studio.
The executive producer by Michel Esteban.

Tracks 1 to 10

Produced by Lizzy Mercier Descloux and Steve Stanley
Recorded at Compass Point Studios, Nassau Bahamas, 1980

- Lizzy Mercier Descloux – vocals, guitars
- Yann Le ker – guitars
- Philippe Le Mongne – bass
- Bill Pery – drums
- Wally Badarou – synthesizers
- Gregory Zercinsky – percussions

Executive producer Michel Esteban

Tracks 11, 12,13 &16

Recorded by Dominique Blanc, Francard at Continental Studios, Paris 1982
Produced by Adam Kidron
Executive producer Michel Esteban

Track 14

Produced by Lizzy Mercier Descloux & Michel Bassignani
Recorded Chief Worm Studio, Massachusetts, 1995

Track 15

Produced by Lizzy Mercier Descloux & Michel Bassignani
Recorded NYC 1982, Overdubs & Mix by Charlus de la Salle at South Factory Studio 2003
Vocals Lizzy Mercier Descloux, Phillipe Krootchey & Arto Lindsay

=== Design ===
Art direction & Design by Michel Esteban
Photos Credits : Michel Esteban : Front cover, booklet pages 1,2,7,10,12,13,14,15.
Veronique G. page 5.
Art Lugh page 11,14 (background) 16 & Central Digipack cover.
