= One for the Soul =

Studio album by Lizzy Mercier Descloux
- Released: 1986
- Recorded: July–August 1985 (Rio de Janeiro); mixed September–October 1985 (Paris)
- Studio: Polygram Studios, Rio de Janeiro; Marcadet Studio, Paris
- Label: Polydor (France) / CBS
- Producer: Adam Kidron

Lizzy Mercier Descloux chronology
Zulu Rock (1984)	One for the Soul (1986)	Suspense (1988)

One for the Soul is the fourth studio album by the French no wave and post-punk musician Lizzy Mercier Descloux, released in 1986 on Polydor in France and CBS internationally. Produced by Adam Kidron, it was recorded in Rio de Janeiro in July and August 1985 and mixed in Paris later that year. The album is best known for featuring the American jazz trumpeter Chet Baker on three tracks, "Fog Horn Blues," "Off Off Pleasure", and "My Funny Valentine," recorded during Baker's visit to Brazil for the inaugural Free Jazz Festival.

== Background and recording ==
Following the international success of her 1984 album Zulu Rock, Mercier Descloux had planned to record her next project in New Orleans with her South African collaborators from the Zulu Rock sessions, but the South African authorities refused exit visas to her Soweto-based musicians. She and Kidron relocated the project to Rio de Janeiro, where they recorded at Polygram Studios in July and August 1985 with a group of Brazilian session musicians; the album was mixed in September and October at the Marcadet Studio in Paris.

Baker was in Brazil in August 1985 as the closing-night star of the first Free Jazz Festival, held in São Paulo and Rio de Janeiro, on a bill that also included Sonny Rollins, McCoy Tyner and Phil Woods. According to his biographer James Gavin, the trip was prompted in part by Baker's longstanding popularity in Brazil, where his 1954 album Chet Baker Sings had been admired by the founding figures of bossa nova, including João Gilberto, Roberto Menescal, Nara Leão and Carlos Lyra. While in Rio, Baker recorded with Mercier Descloux for One for the Soul; the Jazz Discography Project catalogues the session as "Chet Baker with Lizzy Mercier Descloux Orch., Rio de Janeiro, Brazil, July-August 1985". The sessions came near the middle, rather than at the end, of his final three years of recording, which included subsequent dates with Van Morrison at Ronnie Scott's in November 1986, the studio album Chet Baker in Tokyo in 1987, and The Last Great Concert with the NDR Big Band in April 1988.

In the liner notes to the 2016 reissue, Kidron described the recording as physically taxing and recalled that Baker had been "very much at the drug-ravaged end of his life" with limited stamina, but praised his playing as deep, sad and lyrical.

== Reception ==
One for the Soul was a commercial failure on initial release, and its disappointing reception led to the end of the working relationship between Mercier Descloux, Kidron and her manager Michel Esteban.

The album was reissued on vinyl, CD and digital formats by Light in the Attic Records (LITA 139) on 26 February 2016, with bonus tracks, remastered audio and new liner notes by the music journalist Vivien Goldman. The reissue prompted retrospective reappraisal in the music press. Writing in PopMatters, Matthew Fiander gave the four-album reissue series a rating of 7/10 and singled out the interplay between Baker and Mercier Descloux on "Fog Horn Blues" as infectious, though he was lukewarm about the album's cover of Rodgers and Hart's "My Funny Valentine". The Arts Desk critic Kieron Tyler judged One for the Soul more favourably than its 1988 successor, Suspense, in his survey of the Light in the Attic reissue programme. Laura Snapes profiled Mercier Descloux's full career, including the Brazilian sessions, in a long-form feature for The Pitchfork Review in 2015, and David McKenna placed the album within Mercier Descloux's broader posthumous reappraisal in a feature for The Quietus.

== Track listing ==
The album was issued with the following track listing on the original 1986 Polydor LP (France, catalogue 827 910-1).

Side one

1. "Funky Stuff"
2. "Fog Horn Blues" (featuring Chet Baker)
3. "Off Off Pleasure" (featuring Chet Baker)
4. "Let's Get It On"

Side two

1. "Fool for the Pool"
2. "My Funny Valentine" (featuring Chet Baker)
3. "Simply Beautiful"
4. "Brazil Mood"

== Personnel ==
Personnel adapted from the 1986 album sleeve.

- Lizzy Mercier Descloux – vocals
- Chet Baker – trumpet on "Fog Horn Blues" and "Off Off Pleasure"
- Adam Kidron – producer
- Michel Esteban – project coordinator, personal management
- Olivier de Bosson – engineer
- Marcio Gama – engineer
- Alceu Maia, Slim Batteux, Lorenza Johnson, Jose Luiz Mazziotti – additional musicians and vocals
- Jorge Degas, Jamil Jones dos Santos, Harry Bruce – bass
- Luiz Fernando M. Lima – piano
