= Mais où sont passées les gazelles ? =

Single by Lizzy Mercier Descloux

from the album Zulu Rock
- B-side: "Les Dents de l'Amour"
- Released: 1984
- Recorded: 1983–1984
- Genre: Xitsonga disco
- Length: 5:03 (12-inch); 3:48 (7-inch)
- Label: CBS
- Songwriters: Lizzy Mercier Descloux, Obed Ngobeni, Peter Moticoe
- Producer: Adam Kidron

Lizzy Mercier Descloux singles chronology
"Mais où sont passées les gazelles ?" (1984)	"Wawa" (1984)

"Mais où sont passées les gazelles ?" (lit. 'But where have the gazelles gone?') is a 1984 single by the French singer Lizzy Mercier Descloux, released by CBS as the lead single from her third studio album Zulu Rock. A French-language adaptation of the 1983 Xitsonga disco track "Ku Hluvukile eka 'Zete'" by Obed Ngobeni and the Kurhula Sisters, the song was recorded with South African musicians in Johannesburg and became Mercier Descloux's best-known recording, earning her the 1984 Bus d'Acier award.

== Background and recording ==
In 1983, Mercier Descloux travelled through Africa with backing from Alain Levy of CBS France, retracing Arthur Rimbaud's southward route from Ethiopia and eventually reaching apartheid-era South Africa. Producer Adam Kidron and Mercier Descloux recorded the basic tracks for the Zulu Rock album in Johannesburg with South African musicians.

The song is a French-language adaptation of "Ku Hluvukile eka 'Zete'" (later reissued as "Kazet"), a 1983 Xitsonga disco track by the South African singer Obed Ngobeni and his group the Kurhula Sisters, produced by Peter Moticoe. Mercier Descloux wrote new French lyrics over the original arrangement; songwriting credits on the released single are shared among her, Ngobeni and Moticoe. The South African vocal group Mahlathini and the Mahotella Queens later recorded their own version of the Ngobeni original as "Kazet".

According to journalist Laura Snapes, Mercier Descloux conceived the song as an impressionistic protest against apartheid, using a forthcoming planned book of interviews with Soweto residents as a parallel project. A music video was filmed on her return to South Africa in 1984, in part at The Pelican, a shebeen-style club in Soweto. The clip is preserved in the broadcast archive of France's Institut national de l'audiovisuel.

== Release ==
The song was released by CBS in France in 1984 in two formats: a 7-inch single backed with "Les Dents de l'Amour", and a 12-inch maxi-single (catalogue number CBSA 12-4120) carrying an extended A-side and the additional B-side "Mister Soweto". ZE Records reissued the recordings as a four-track digital EP in 2008.

== Reception ==
"Mais où sont passées les gazelles ?" was a commercial success in France during the summer of 1984. Mercier Descloux received the 1984 Bus d'Acier, a French rock-press prize sponsored by SACEM and awarded annually by a jury of music journalists between 1981 and 1996, for the song. The trophy was presented to her by a previous winner, Alain Bashung.

In a 2015 long-form profile for Pitchfork, Laura Snapes situated the song among the earliest Western adaptations of South African pop music, predating Paul Simon's Graceland (1986) and contemporaneous with Malcolm McLaren's Duck Rock (1983). Writing in The Quietus, David McKenna treated the recording as the most commercially successful and stylistically open product of Mercier Descloux's collaborations with non-Western musicians. PopMatters identified the source-song relationship to Obed Ngobeni in its 2016 retrospective of the Light in the Attic reissue programme.

The South African scholar S. Bila, in a 2021 peer-reviewed article in HTS Teologiese Studies, cites Mercier Descloux's recording as the first international version of "Ku Hluvukile eka 'Zete'" and as evidence that the song "was the first in Xitsonga music history to attract scores of artists around the world to record their versions".

== Track listings ==
7-inch single (CBS, France, 1984)

1. "Mais Où Sont Passées Les Gazelles" – 3:48
2. "Les Dents de l'Amour" – 3:15

12-inch maxi-single (CBS CBSA 12-4120, France, 1984)

1. "Mais Où Sont Passées Les Gazelles" (Extended) – 5:03
2. "Mister Soweto" – 2:47
3. "Les Dents de l'Amour" – 3:15

== Personnel ==
Adapted from the 1984 CBS pressings and the 2016 Light in the Attic Records reissue of Zulu Rock.

- Lizzy Mercier Descloux – lead vocals, lyrics
- Adam Kidron – producer
- Obed Ngobeni – original music (as "Ku Hluvukile eka 'Zete'")
- Peter Moticoe – original music (as "Ku Hluvukile eka 'Zete'")
