= Rebel Records (France) =

French independent record label

- Founded: 1977
- Founder: Michel Esteban
- Status: closed in 1978
- Genre: No Wave, Indie Rock
- Country of origin: France
- Location: Paris

Rebel Records was a Paris-based independent music label created in 1977 by Michel Esteban. The office of the label was in Paris, 12 rue des Halles, above the rock concept store "Harry Cover" founded by Esteban. The label closed in 1978

Esteban signed Marie et les Garçons, a French new wave band from Lyon, and produced and released their first three-track EP in 1977. He then asked his friend John Cale to produce their second single. "Rebop" was recorded in the Big Apple studio in New York City. The single was released on Rebel records in France in 1978.

Then Esteban joined SPY Records, the label founded by John Cale and Jane Friedman, Patti Smith's manager. Marie et les Garçons' single "Rebop" was then released on SPY records in the US. Rebel Records released a third and last single from the New York, no wave band "Mars" produced by Patti Smith and Jay Dee Daugherty.

In 1978 Esteban left SPY Records to found ZE Records with Michael Zilkha.

== Discography ==
=== Discography Rebel Records ===
- RB 7701 Marie Et Les Garçons – Rien a Dire / A bout de Souffle / Mardi Soir (7", EP)
- RB 7702 Marie Et Les Garçons – Rien a Dire / A bout de Souffle / Mardi Soir (12", EP)
- RB 7703 Marie Et Les Garçons – Rebop / Attitudes (7", Single)
- RB 7802 Mars – 3E / 11.000 Volts (7", Single)

=== Re-Released on ZE records in 1979 ===
- ZE1201 Marie Et Les Garçons – Rebop / Attitudes/ Rien A Dire Medley (12", Single)
- ZE12010 Mars – 3E / 11.000 Volts (12", Single)
