= Marie et les Garçons =

- Also known as: Femme Fatale; Garçons
- Origin: Lyon, France
- Genres: Punk rock; new wave; mutant disco
- Years active: 1975–1980 (Note: Reunions in: 1987, 1988, 1990, 2009, 2011 and 2015)
- Labels: Rebel Records; SPY Records; ZE Records
- Past members: Marie Girard; Patrick Vidal; Erik Fitoussi; Christian Faye; Jean-Marc Vallod; Jean-Pierre Charriau
- Website: Marie et les Garçons

Marie et les Garçons were a French punk rock band formed in Lyon in 1975. After Marie Girard left, the remaining members continued as Garçons.

== History ==
In 1975, students leaving the Lycée Saint-Exupéry in Lyon formed a band, Femme Fatale, playing songs by the Velvet Underground, Roxy Music, The Seeds and others. The band members were Marie Girard (1956 - 6 August 1996) (vocals), Patrick Vidal (b. 1957) (bass, vocals), Erik Fitoussi (guitar), Christian Faye (guitar) and Philippe Girard (drums). After a few months, Philippe Girard left, and was replaced on drums by his sister Marie. Vidal took over as lead singer, Jean-Marc Vallod (bass) joined the band, and, on the advice of Marc Zermati of Skydog Records, they changed their name to Marie et les Garçons. Faye left soon afterwards.

In June 1977, the band performed at the Mont de Marsan Festival at Zermati's invitation. Their demo records were heard by Michel Esteban, founder of the leading Paris rock merchandise shop Harry Cover, who soon signed them to his new label Rebel Records. Vallod then left the band, being replaced by bassist Jean-Pierre Charriau. The band's first single, "Rien à dire", produced by Esteban and, like most of their material, written by Vidal and Fitoussi, was released in December 1977. Esteban played demos of the band to John Cale, who offered to produce the band in New York City. In March 1978, they recorded another single, "Attitudes" / "Re-Bop", in New York; Cale played piano and marimba on the record. The record was released on Esteban's Rebel label in France, and then on Cale's SPY label in the US. The band also played at CBGB, supporting X-Ray Spex, before returning to Paris where they supported Patti Smith and, later in the year, Talking Heads. Later in 1978, "Re-Bop", coupled with the band's version of the Village People's "Macho Man", was issued as a single on ZE Records, the new label formed in New York by Esteban with Michael Zilkha.

The band were on hold for several months while Fitoussi and Charriau undertook national service, and on their return Esteban and Vidal sought to lead their music more towards the mutant disco style of other ZE artists. While recording their first album in New York, Marie Girard left the group and returned to France, and the band became "Garçons". Their album, Divorce, was released in March 1979, together with a single "French Boy", but neither were commercially successful; a re-recorded version of "Re-Bop" was also released. The band toured in 1979, with an augmented line-up including Jimmy Young (drums), Eric Melon (guitar), Allen Wentz (keyboards), Milton Cardona (percussion), three horn players and two singers, as well as Vidal, Fitoussi and Charriau. Fitoussi also played on the debut album by Lizzy Mercier Descloux. Vidal then left the band, and Fitoussi, Charriau and Melon, plus Chris Levrat (keyboards), undertook a final short tour in Europe in early 1980.

== Later careers and reunions ==
Marie Girard joined the band Electric Callas, and also released a solo single, "Les Indiens", in 1983. She later worked as a fashion designer. Fitoussi and Charriau formed a band, Tabou.

Patrick Vidal recorded an album, Paolino Park, in 1983, with Franck Darcel and the band Octobre, and a single with Darcel, "L'Océan", in 1987, under the name Senso. He then formed Discotique and Sutra with Thomas Bourdeau, before becoming resident DJ in various clubs in Paris and London. He has also composed music for fashion shows and shops.

Marie et les Garçons reunited in 1987 to re-record "Re-Bop", and performed on stage together in 1988 and again in 1990. A compilation album, 76-77, was issued in 1989.

Marie Girard died of an aneurysm in 1996, aged 40.

== Discography ==
=== Singles ===
- "Rien à Dire" / "A Bout De Souffle" / "Mardi Soir" (1977, Rebel)
- "Attitudes" / "Re-Bop" (1978, Spy)
- "Re-Bop" / "Attitudes" / "Rien A Dire" (1979, ZE)
- "French Boy" / "French Boy (reprise)" (Garçons) (1979, ZE)
- "Re-Bop" / "Bop electronique" (Garçons) (1979, ZE)
- "Re-Bop (Electronique)" / "P4 n°1" (Garçons) (1980, ZE-Island)
- "Les Deux Amants" / "Dans Quelques Minutes" (Garçons) (1980, ZE-Cel)
- "Amicalement Vôtre" / "Les Globetrotters" (Garçons) (1980, ZE-Cel)

=== Albums ===
- Divorce (Garçons) (1979, ZE)
- Marie et les Garçons (1980, ZE-Cel)
