= Desiderata (Mercier Descloux book) =

Artist's book by Lizzy Mercier Descloux

- Author: Lizzy Mercier Descloux
- Translator: Emma Ramadan (2022 and 2025 editions)
- Illustrator: Lizzy Mercier Descloux (with contributions by Patti Smith and Richard Hell)
- Language: French (1977); French and English (2022); English (2025)
- Genre: Poetry, artist's book
- Publisher: Self-published (1977); Inpatient Press (2022); Inpatient Press / Mercurial Editions, distributed by Penguin Random House and MIT Press (2025)
- Publication date: 1977
- Publication place: France (1st edition); United States (reissues)
- English publication date: 2022
- Media type: Paperback chapbook
- Pages: 114 (2022 edition)
- ISBN: 978-1-965874-08-0

Desiderata is an artist's book by the French musician and singer-songwriter Lizzy Mercier Descloux, originally self-published in Paris in 1977 and reissued in facsimile with an English translation in 2022 and again, in an expanded edition with a foreword by Patti Smith, in 2025. The book contains twenty-five poems Mercier Descloux wrote during her first trip to New York City in the winter of 1975, interleaved with drawings, collages, handwritten notes, and photographs.

== Background ==
Mercier Descloux, then in her late teens, travelled to New York in the winter of 1975 with her partner Michel Esteban, the future co-founder of ZE Records. Through Esteban's bookshop and music outlets in Les Halles she had already become acquainted with Patti Smith and Richard Hell. In New York she stayed at Smith's apartment on Lafayette Street, where she wrote much of the material that would appear in Desiderata. Returning to Paris in 1977, she compiled the book with editorial assistance from Esteban; Smith contributed a French-language preface and Hell provided additional material. The original print run was approximately 1,000 copies, distributed largely through Esteban's Harry Cover boutique and through Mercier Descloux's personal network rather than ordinary bookstore channels.

== Contents ==
The book interleaves twenty-five poems with the author's drawings, collages, handwritten notes and photographs. The poems are short, fragmentary, and structurally indebted to Arthur Rimbaud and the Comte de Lautréamont, whose portrait appears in the book. Titles include "One Fifth", "Hudson River", "Siberian", "Earwig", "Let Me Go Perish", "ANTIMACASSAR", "Eva with the Compliments of the Air Force", "Isadora Duncan Pallet", "Meat", "From Breme", and "Slipped Disc," as well as untitled poems and fragments. Among the photographs is a portrait of Mercier Descloux and Patti Smith dressed as Arthur Rimbaud and his sister Isabelle.

Smith's preface, addressed ostensibly to the filmmaker Robert Bresson, doubles as a critique of Abstract Expressionist machismo, recasting Jackson Pollock and Willem de Kooning as figures of violence.

== Publication history ==
Desiderata was self-published in Paris in 1977 in an edition of approximately 1,000 copies. No formal dépôt légal appears to have been registered; the Bibliothèque nationale de France does not list the chapbook among its holdings under its authority record for the author.

In 2022 the New York–based small press Inpatient Press published a facsimile of the 1977 chapbook in a 114-page softcover tête-bêche edition, with a new English translation by Emma Ramadan bound back-to-back with the French original. In 2025 Inpatient Press and Mercurial Editions issued an expanded edition, with a new foreword by Patti Smith. Penguin Random House and the MIT Press distributed this book in the United States.

== Reception ==
The 2022 facsimile was reviewed at length by Patrick Lyons in BOMB, who placed the book in dialogue with Rimbaud and Lautréamont, examined Ramadan's translation choices, and read the book's visual-poetic juxtapositions as anticipating Mercier Descloux's later musical work. A selection of poems from the new translation appeared in the literary magazine Fence.

The 2025 expanded edition was reviewed in The Brooklyn Rail, which framed the book against the downtown New York poetic culture of the 1970s, analysed individual page-spreads in detail, and described Mercier Descloux as a peer of Lee Krasner and Elaine de Kooning in her articulation of a feminine voice against a male-dominated artistic milieu.

The chapbook is discussed in passing in Simon Clair's biography Lizzy Mercier Descloux, une éclipse (Playlist Society, 2019), and Mercier Descloux's New York correspondence from the period, including letters describing the book's composition, was published in 2023 as Don't Take Care of Yourself: Lettres à Christine 1974–1983 (Isti Mirant Stella).
