= Lizzy Mercier Descloux (album) =

Studio album by Lizzy Mercier Descloux
- Released: 1984
- Recorded: 1983–1984
- Genre: Worldbeat
- Label: ZE
- Producer: Adam Kidron, Michel Esteban

Lizzy Mercier Descloux chronology
Mambo Nassau (1981)	Lizzy Mercier Descloux (1984)	One For the Soul (1985)

Lizzy Mercier Descloux is the third album of French singer Lizzy Mercier Descloux, which was released on ZE Records in 1984 and recorded at the Satbel Studio, Johannesburg, South Africa. Its sound was inspired by African folk music mixed with 80's French pop. An alternate version of the album was entitled "Mais où Sont Passées les Gazelles" ("But Where Have The Gazelles Gone?"; "Mais où Sont Passées les Gazelles" is also the title of the third track off of the album, released as a single in 1984).

== Reception ==
After "Mais où Sont Passées les Gazelles" became a hit single in France, Mercier Descloux' music received some public attention. Zulu Rock was highly acclaimed by press and audience; some critics even proclaimed it "album of the year".

== Zulu Rock ==
A new version of the album, retitled Zulu Rock, was released in 2006. It contains English recordings of most of the songs, digitally remastered from analogue master tapes. The original French versions of these songs are included as bonus tracks.

Professional ratings
Review scores
Source	Rating
Allmusic	4/5 stars

== Track listing ==
All songs written by Lizzy Mercier Descloux unless otherwise noted.

Zulu Rock 2006 ZE Records Reissue
No.	Title	Music	Length
1.	"It's all my Imagination"		3:30
2.	"Abyssinia"	Peter Motico, Phineas Mnikathi	2:59
3.	"Mais où Sont Passées Les Gazelles?"	Peter Motico, Obed Ngobeni	3:31
4.	"Dolby Sisters Saliva Brothers"	Sibongile Mazibuko	2:40
5.	"L'éclipse"		3:22
6.	"Les Dents de L'Amour"	Allian David	2:17
7.	"Wakwazulu Kwzizulu Rock"	Elfaz Zondi	2:39
8.	"Momo on My Mind"		3:08
9.	"I'm Liquor"		3:02
10.	"Queen of Overdub Kisses"		3:36
11.	"Sun Jive"	Sammy Kiaas	2:46
12.	"All the Same"		4:50
13.	"Pénélope" (French version)		3:27
14.	"Confidente de la Nuit" (French version)	Peter Motico, Phineas Mnikathi	3:00
15.	"Cri French Version"		3:22
16.	"Tous Pareils" (French version)
17.	"Wakwazulu Kwzizulu Rock" (French version)	Elfaz Zondi	4:58
18.	"Wakwazulu Kwzizulu Rock" (Extended remix)	Elfaz Zondi	2:58
19.	Untitled		4:56

== Personnel ==
=== Sound ===
The album was produced by Adam Kidron and Michel Esteban. Zulu Rock, the new version of the album released in 2006, was digitally remastered by Charlus de la Salle at South Factory Studio.

=== Musicians ===
South Africa

It was recorded in 1983 at Satbel Studio, Johannesburg, South Africa with the engineer Phil Audoire and the following musicians:

- Sammy Kiaas – guitar
- Richard "Bugzie" Hadebe – guitar
- David Mabaso – bass
- Desmond Malotana – organ
- Domesani – organ
- Hayward (Maichala) Mahlangu – percussion
- Fats Mlangeni – drums
- Allian David – accordion
- Javas Magubane – saxophone
- Thomas Phale – saxophone
- The Tiyimeleni Youngs Sisters – backing vocals
- The Roadworkers – backing vocals
- Peter Mottico – whistle, backing vocals
- John Galanakis – music co-ordinator

London

Additional music for the album was recorded and mixed in 1984 at Berry Street Studio, London, with the following musicians:

- Steve Sidwell – trumpet
- David Snell – harp
- Henry Krein – accordion on "Les Dents de L'Amour", "Momo in My Mind" and "Wakwazulu Kwezizulu Rock"
- Ross McFarlane – "Les Dents de L'Amour"
- Ross Me Kein – backing vocals
- Cassia Kidron – backing vocals

=== Design ===
All designs for the cover, booklet, and photos were made by Michel Esteban.
