= Ramona Brooks =

American actress (1951 - 2014)

Ramona L. Brooks (January 8, 1951 – June 2, 2014) was an American singer and actress. A member of Lady Flash, Barry Manilow's backup group, she sang on his 1975 Album Tryin' to Get the Feeling. She also performed on Lizzy Mercier Descloux's 1979 album Press Color. Tom Spahn was her vocal coach. Her 1977 solo single Skinnydippin hit 94 on what is now the Billboard Hot R&B/Hip-Hop Songs chart, and I Don't Want You Back reached 55 on the U.S. Dance Club Songs chart in 1981. On Broadway, she appeared with Doug Henning in The Magic Show at the Cort Theater, and with Billy Dee Williams in I Have a Dream, at the Ambassador Theater in 1976. Her brief movie career included appearing as "Hooker #1" in the 1980 Frank Sinatra vehicle The First Deadly Sin and as "Hooker #2" in 1983's Vigilante. Her brother Paul Stubblefield was the drummer for the 1970s Cleveland Jazz/Funk group Sounds of Unity and Love, her cousin is Hammond organ player Ike Stubblefield. She died of cancer in a hospice facility in Oregon.
