= Dragnet =

Dragnet may refer to:

== Common meanings ==
- Dragnet, a fishing net used in seine fishing
- Dragnet (policing), a coordinated search, named after the fishing net

== Arts and entertainment ==
- Dragnet (franchise)
  - Dragnet (radio series), a 1949–1957 American radio series starring Jack Webb
  - Dragnet (1951 TV series), the 1951–1959 American television spinoff from the radio series
  - Dragnet (1954 film), a film version of the television and radio series starring and directed by Jack Webb
  - Dragnet (1967 TV series), the 1967–1970 revival of the original television series
  - Dragnet (1987 film), a parody of the television series starring Dan Aykroyd and Tom Hanks
  - Dragnet, also known as The New Dragnet, see Dragnet (franchise)#1989 series: The New Dragnet
  - Dragnet (2003 TV series), also known as L.A. Dragnet, see Dragnet (franchise)#2003 series: L.A. Dragnet
    - "Dragnet" (theme music), from the various series
- The Drag Net, a 1928 American silent film
- Dragnet (1947 film), a 1947 American film starring Henry Wilco
- Dragnet (album), by The Fall
- "Dragnet", a poem by Patti Smith in Witt
