= Bus d'Acier =

French rock music award, 1981–1996

- Grand Prix du rock français
- Description: Annual prize for the best French rock artist of the year
- Country: France
- Presented by: Bus Palladium / SACEM
- First award: 1981
- Final award: 1996

The Bus d'Acier (French pronunciation: [bys dɑsjɛʁ], "Steel Bus"), also known as the Grand Prix du rock français ("Grand Prize of French Rock"), was a French music award presented annually from 1981 to 1996 to recognise the outstanding French rock artist or recording of the year. Created and organised by music journalist and publicist Sylvie Jouffa, and sponsored by the Parisian nightclub Le Bus Palladium and by the SACEM (the French composers' and publishers' collecting society), it was, for roughly fifteen years, the principal specialist distinction for French-language rock music and was described by the press of the time as "the Goncourt of French rock".

== History ==
The award was conceived in 1981 by Sylvie Jouffa, who created and organised it until its final edition in 1996. It was hosted by the Bus Palladium, the celebrated rock venue at 6 rue Pierre-Fontaine in the 9th arrondissement of Paris, under the direction of the club's manager Richard Erman, and was co-sponsored by the SACEM throughout its run.

The prize was created at a time when French-language rock was emerging as a commercially and critically significant genre but had no dedicated specialist award. The Victoires de la Musique, which later developed rock categories of its own, were not established until 1985. Cyril Bodin, the Bus Palladium's final artistic director, described the Bus d'Acier as "the equivalent of the Victoires de la Musique for rock".

== Selection process ==
The laureate was chosen each year by a jury of approximately thirty specialist rock journalists drawn from the written press, radio and television. The jury assembled for a formal lunch, at which voting was conducted by secret paper ballot over several rounds, with the ballots counted in the presence of a huissier de justice (judicial bailiff) to certify the result — an unusual formality for a music award. The prize was then presented the same evening on the stage of the Bus Palladium before members of the press and broadcast media, after which the winning artist took part in an improvised jam session (bœuf) with other nominated artists.

== Trophy ==
The trophy was a statuette depicting a double-decker bus pierced by an electric guitar — a visual play on the name of the sponsoring venue. At the inaugural 1981 ceremony, the definitive trophy was not finished in time; Alain Bashung was photographed accepting a British toy double-decker bus, painted silver as a stand-in.

== Notable ceremonies ==
=== 1987: the Gogol Premier incident ===
At the 1987 jury lunch, performance artist Gogol Premier stole the trophy before the official presentation could take place. He subsequently returned it that evening on the stage of the Bus Palladium, where it was presented to Carte de Séjour by the former Minister of Culture Jack Lang. The episode received wide media coverage and raised the profile of the prize considerably.

=== 1988: Bérurier Noir refuses the award ===
In 1988 the prize was awarded to the anarcho-punk group Bérurier Noir, who publicly refused it on ideological grounds. According to singer François Guillemot, the group found the award's mainstream showbusiness context incompatible with their ethos: "They should give us a venue, an hour of airtime where we can do what we want, not a ridiculous object with all of showbusiness." Despite the public refusal, the group ultimately took the trophy; according to later accounts it remained in the band's equipment van for approximately a year.

== Decline and end ==
By the mid-1990s the award had lost its media profile, as the expanding Victoires de la Musique absorbed rock categories and the specialist press landscape shifted. Gérard Bardavid, a juror throughout the prize's existence, noted that the Bus d'Acier faded "faute de relais médiatique" (for want of media support). No laureate has been identified for 1994 or 1995 in any available source; the final award was presented to Kat Onoma in 1996. The Bus Palladium itself closed permanently on 23 April 2022.

== Winners ==
Year	Laureate	Work cited	Notes
1981	Alain Bashung	"Gaby oh Gaby" / Pizza	First edition; trophy was an improvised toy bus
1982	Charlélie Couture	Poèmes rock	
1983	Indochine	"L'Aventurier" / L'Aventurier	
1984	Lizzy Mercier Descloux	"Mais où sont passées les gazelles" / Zulu Rock	Trophy presented by previous winner Alain Bashung
1985	Étienne Daho	La Notte, La Notte / "Tombé pour la France"	Ceremony held 16 April 1985; reported as "Daho d'acier" by Libération, 18 April 1985
1986	Stephan Eicher	I Tell This Night	
1987	Carte de Séjour	2 ½ / "Douce France"	Presented by Jack Lang; trophy stolen and returned by Gogol Premier
1988	Bérurier Noir	—	Refused on ideological grounds; trophy eventually taken
1989	Noir Désir	Veuillez rendre l'âme (à qui elle appartient) / "Aux sombres héros de l'amer"	First gold record for the group
1990	Mano Negra	Puta's Fever	
1990	Les Rita Mitsouko	(career)	Special Bus d'Acier de la décennie ("Bus d'Acier of the Decade") for body of work, marking the award's 10th anniversary
1991	Paul Personne	La Route de la chance	
1992	Les Innocents	Fous à lier	
1993	FFF	Free for Fever	RATP-sponsored trophy; band photographed in a vintage Paris bus
1994			
1995			
1996	Kat Onoma	—	Final edition of the award

== See also ==
- Bus Palladium
- Victoires de la Musique
- SACEM
- French rock
