= Sabotage/Live =

Live album by John Cale
- Released: 20 December 1979
- Recorded: 13–16 June 1979
- Venue: CBGB (New York City)
- Genre: Rock
- Length: 45:30
- Labels: SPY/I.R.S. (original release), A&M Canada (reissue), Diesel Motor (reissue)
- Producer: John Cale

John Cale chronology
Guts (1977)	Sabotage/Live (1979)	Honi Soit (1981)

Alternative cover
- Cover of the 1999 deluxe re-issue.

Professional ratings
Review scores
Source	Rating
AllMusic	4/5 stars
Christgau's Record Guide	B
Rolling Stone	favourable
Trouser Press	unfavourable

Sabotage/Live is a live album by the Welsh rock musician John Cale. It was recorded at CBGB, New York City on 13–16 June 1979, and released by SPY Records in December 1979.

== Release ==
A studio version of "Mercenaries (Ready for War)" was released as a single in the US on 14 March 1980. The sleeve notes that are on the B-side state that the "vocal distortion (is) intended."

It was later reissued on CD by A&M Records Canada, and reissued again in the UK by Diesel Motor Records. Both CD releases use the same vinyl rip as the source recording. The Diesel Motor CD reissue contains four extra tracks. The first three are originally from Cale's debut extended play (EP) Animal Justice (1977), while the fourth was the B-side of the "Mercenaries (Ready for War)" single (the A-side, which was an entirely different recording than the live album version, was not included as the master tape is lost). However, this was included on the unofficial download available on the ZE Records website from 2011.

== Critical reception ==
NME said of the backing band, "What they lack in finesse they make up for with a remorseless drive that equally befits Cale's cold-blooded, gut-churning music of fear – but puts the weight on the gut-churning. In fact it's surprising that there isn't a song about a mass-murderer amongst them; instead, for the first side at least, Cale is in the grip of post-nuclear mental tremors, raving obsessively about espionage, atom bombs and the dogs of war."

== Track listing ==
All tracks are written by John Cale, except where noted.

Side A
No.	Title	Writer(s)	Length
1.	"Mercenaries (Ready for War)"		7:33
2.	"Baby You Know"		3:52
3.	"Evidence"		3:28
4.	"Dr. Mudd"		3:42
5.	"Walkin' the Dog"	Rufus Thomas Jr.	4:06

Side B
No.	Title	Length
6.	"Captain Hook"	11:26
7.	"Only Time Will Tell"	2:37
8.	"Sabotage"	4:59
9.	"Chorale"	3:42
Total length:		45:30

Note: Early vinyl versions contain a locked-groove of alarm-like noise at the end of Side 2.

Bonus tracks on 1999 reissue
No.	Title	Writer(s)	Length
10.	"Chicken Shit"		3:57
11.	"Memphis"	Chuck Berry	4:00
12.	"Hedda Gabler"		5:23
13.	"Rosegarden Funeral of Sores"		5:50

Bonus track on 2011 remastered download
No.	Title	Length
14.	"Mercenaries" (Studio Version)	4:21

== Personnel ==
- John Cale − vocals, piano, guitar, fretless bass, viola
- Marc Aaron − lead guitar
- Joe Bidewell − keyboards, vocals
- Doug Bowne − drums, vocals
- Deerfrance − percussion, vocals
- George Scott − bass, vocals

Technical

- Jane Friedman − executive producer
- Charlie Martin − recording
- Warren Frank, John Cale - mixing
- John Vogel − art direction
- Hugh Brown − photography

Animal Justice EP

- John Cale − vocals
- Ritchie Flieger − guitar
- Jimmy Bain − bass
- Bruce Brody − Moog synthesizer
- Kevin Currie − drums
- Jane Friedman − backing vocals on "Chicken Shit"

"Rosegarden Funeral of Sores"

- John Cale − vocals, bass, Wurlitzer electronic piano
- Michael Mason − rhythm/drum machine

"Mercenaries (Ready for War)" single version recorded at Plaza Sound, New York City

- John Cale − vocals, organ, guitar
- Joe Bidewell − Hammond organ, vocals
- Peter Muny − bass guitar, vocals
- Deerfrance − vocals
- Robert Medici − drums, vocals
- Sturgis Nikides − lead guitar (Gibson Firebird)
