= Lionel White (musician) =

American musician

Lionel White (1948–1998) was an American funk and punk rock musician who recorded music under the name Snuky Tate. He is best remembered for his novelty single He's the Groove (1979) about Pope John Paul II.

== Biography ==
Lionel White was born in Wilmington, Delaware, United States in 1948 and studied painting at the University of Delaware. One of his influences was Jimi Hendrix. In the early 1970s he moved to San Francisco where he adapted a comedy character named Snuky Tate, which he performed on stage during punk concerts. In 1979 he was part of the San Francisco art rock band The Alterboys, in which Richard Edson was a member too. The same year White recorded his first musical single, "Who Cares?", and released it on Blackmouth Music under the name Snuky Tate. At the start of the 1980s he moved to New York and recorded his second musical single, "He's the Groove", released on Blackmouth Music, and later picked up by Ze Records, which was a funky pop single about Pope John Paul II. In 1982 he released the album Babylon Under Pressure on Chris Stein's Animal Records. Snuky Tate's records were released on ZE Records. He died in 1998.

He identified as being homosexual.
