= Lizzy Mercier Descloux =

French singer-songwriter (1956–2004)

- Mercier Descloux in 1981

Background information
- Born: Martine-Elisabeth Mercier Descloux; 16 December 1956; Paris, France
- Died: 20 April 2004 (aged 47) Saint-Florent, Corsica
- Genres: Post-punk; no wave; worldbeat; mutant disco
- Occupations: Musician; singer; songwriter; composer
- Instruments: Vocals; guitar
- Years active: 1978–1999
- Labels: ZE; Island; Philips; CBS; Polydor
- Website: lizzymercierdescloux.com

Martine-Elisabeth Mercier Descloux (16 December 1956 – 20 April 2004) was a French musician, singer-songwriter, and composer associated with New York City's late 1970s no wave music scene. She recorded several albums on ZE Records beginning with her 1979 debut Press Color.

== Early life ==
Mercier Descloux was born Martine-Élisabeth Mercier on 16 December 1956 in Paris, and was raised in Lyon by an aunt who worked at the Renault factory before returning to Paris in her teens. She briefly attended the École nationale supérieure des Beaux-Arts and lived at 11 rue des Halles in the 1st arrondissement, opposite the boutique Harry Cover, which the journalist and impresario Michel Esteban had opened at number 12 in 1973. She and Esteban became partners; she adopted her father's surname Descloux, in addition to her mother's name Mercier, as her professional surname.

In 1975 Esteban launched the magazine Rock News, with Iggy Pop on the cover of its first issue and coverage of The Velvet Underground, the New York Dolls and the nascent New York punk scene; Mercier Descloux contributed to the magazine and travelled with Esteban into the milieu around Le Bataclan and the Halles district that would later produce ZE Records.

== Musical career ==
=== First New York visit and Desiderata (1975–1977) ===
Aged eighteen, Mercier Descloux made her first trip to New York City in the winter of 1975. She stayed at Patti Smith's apartment on Lafayette Street and befriended Smith and the poet and musician Richard Hell. During this and subsequent visits she attended performances at CBGB by the Ramones, Television, the Patti Smith Group and the Hell-era Heartbreakers.

On her return to Paris in 1977, Mercier Descloux self-published Desiderata, an artist's book containing twenty-five poems she had written in New York, interspersed with her drawings, collages and photographs, with editorial assistance from Esteban and a preface by Patti Smith. Smith and Hell also contributed images and ephemera to the volume. Mercier Descloux had taken the photograph of Smith printed in the inner sleeve of Smith's 1976 album Radio Ethiopia, and Hell would write the song "Another World" on his 1977 debut album Blank Generation for her.

=== Rosa Yemen and Press Color (1977–1980) ===
Later in 1977, Mercier Descloux moved permanently to New York with Esteban, initially staying with Patti Smith on Lafayette Street. Esteban worked briefly for John Cale's SPY Records, where he met Michael Zilkha; in 1978 the two co-founded the independent label ZE Records, which became the home of much of the mutant disco and no wave scene.

In July 1978, Mercier Descloux recorded a six-track EP as the duo Rosa Yemen with the guitarist Didier Esteban (Michel's brother, performing as D.J. Banes), released later that year on ZE Records. The following year, ZE released her solo debut LP Press Color, recorded at Blank Tapes Studios in New York in February 1979 and produced by Banes, Erik Eliasson and Mercier Descloux; it included reworkings of Arthur Brown's "Fire", Lalo Schifrin's Mission Impossible and "Jim on the Move", and a version of Peggy Lee's "Fever" retitled "Tumor". She performed at the Mudd Club, Tier 3 and CBGB during this period. Although the album was poorly distributed in the United States, European critics responded enthusiastically, and Chris Blackwell of Island Records subsequently signed on as a patron of her recordings.

=== Mambo Nassau (1980–1982) ===
In September and October 1980, Mercier Descloux travelled to Nassau, Bahamas, to record her second album, Mambo Nassau, at Compass Point Studios, with the Jamaican engineer Steven Stanley serving as de facto producer and the synthesist Wally Badarou contributing keyboards and co-writing two tracks. Mambo Nassau marked a stylistic pivot away from the dissonant rock textures of Press Color toward Caribbean and African rhythms; it was released on ZE in 1981. The album was a commercial disappointment in the United States but performed well enough in France for CBS France to offer her a new contract. In 1982, she toured Asia, performing in Bangkok, Hong Kong, Macao, Seoul and Japan.

Island Records boss Chris Blackwell bankrolled the sessions in Nassau, Bahamas for her second album Mambo Nassau, with Compass Point All Stars engineer Steven Stanley and keyboardist Wally Badarou co-writing and producing. The album was influenced by African music as well as art rock, funk and soul. While the record was unsuccessful in the U.S., it won her a contract with CBS Records in France.

=== Lizzy Mercier Descloux and African travels (1983–1984) ===
In 1983, with backing from Alain Levy, head of CBS France, Mercier Descloux undertook a long journey through Africa that retraced Arthur Rimbaud's southward route from Ethiopia, eventually reaching apartheid-era South Africa. She recorded in Soweto with South African musicians for what became her third album, Lizzy Mercier Descloux (1984), produced by Adam Kidron. The album's single "Mais où sont passées les gazelles ?", a French reworking of a song associated with the South African vocalist Mahlathini, became an unexpected hit in France during the summer of 1984. Later that year, Mercier Descloux returned to South Africa to play a concert at The Pelican, then the largest underground club in Soweto, and to film the "Gazelles" music video. For Lizzy Mercier Descloux she received the Bus d'Acier, a French rock prize sponsored by SACEM and judged by music journalists; the trophy was presented to her by the previous year's laureate, Alain Bashung.

=== One for the Soul and Brazil (1985–1986) ===
Mercier Descloux had originally planned to record her fourth album in New Orleans with a band combining Cajun, zydeco and Soweto musicians, but the South African authorities refused exit visas to her Soweto-based collaborators. She and producer Adam Kidron relocated the project to Rio de Janeiro, where they recorded at Polygram Studios in July and August 1985 with a group of Brazilian session musicians; the album was mixed at the Marcadet Studio in Paris later that year. During his appearance at the inaugural Free Jazz Festival in August 1985, the American trumpeter Chet Baker recorded several tracks for the album, including "Fog Horn Blues" and "Off Off Pleasure". Released in 1986 as One for the Soul on Polydor and CBS, the album sold poorly; according to producer Adam Kidron, in liner notes for the 2016 reissue, the sessions had been strained. Following the recording, Mercier Descloux spent the latter part of 1985 in Sri Lanka, where she began work on an unpublished novel titled Buenaventura.

=== Suspense and end of recording career (1987–1988) ===
Mercier Descloux's fifth and final studio album, Suspense, was recorded in 1987–88 in Oxfordshire and Wales without Esteban, who had withdrawn from her professional management following One for the Soul. The album was produced principally by John Brand, with Mercier Descloux and the former Mars member Mark Cunningham credited as co-producers; Cunningham and the Australian songwriter James Reyne supplied additional lyrics. After the lead single, "Gueule d'Amour / Cry of Love", failed commercially, EMI buried the album, and Mercier Descloux retreated from recording. Suspense was released on EMI / Polydor in 1988.

=== Retreat and final years (1989–2004) ===
After the commercial failure of Suspense, Mercier Descloux gradually withdrew from the music industry, turning instead to painting and prose. She continued to write occasionally for film, contributing music for the Bhutanese director Khyentse Norbu's The Cup (1999). A planned 1995 collaborative album with Bill Laswell, Iggy Pop, John Cale and Patti Smith was not completed, and an unreleased album recorded with Wally Badarou and the bassist Michel Bassignani at Chief Worm Studio in Massachusetts also remained in the can.

In the 1990s, Mercier Descloux divided her time between travel and painting, working in the West Indies and elsewhere before settling at the beginning of the 2000s in the village of Saint-Florent, on the northern coast of Corsica. She wrote an unpublished novel, Buenaventura, which she had begun during her 1985 stay in Sri Lanka.

Mercier Descloux was diagnosed with cancer after a trip to New York in April 2003. She died on 20 April 2004 in Saint-Florent at the age of 47. Her ashes were scattered in the bay of Saint-Florent in accordance with her wishes. Richard Hell organised a wake at CBGB in New York, and on 8 July 2004, Patti Smith dedicated a performance of "Easter" to her at Le Bataclan in Paris. A posthumous exhibition of her paintings, which she had been preparing at the time of her death, was held in Tokyo later that year.

=== Posthumous reappraisal (2004–present) ===
Critical interest in Mercier Descloux's work grew substantially after her death. Between 2015 and 2016 the American reissue label Light in the Attic Records reissued Press Color, Mambo Nassau, Zulu Rock (the new version of Lizzy Mercier Descloux released in 2006), and One for the Soul with new liner notes by the music journalist Vivien Goldman, prompting profile features in The Quietus, The Pitchfork Review and The Arts Desk.

In March 2019, the French music journalist Simon Clair published the first book-length biography of Mercier Descloux, Lizzy Mercier Descloux, une éclipse, with the Paris imprint Playlist Society. Mercier Descloux's early literary and visual work was returned to print in the 2020s: in 2022, the Brooklyn small press Inpatient Press published a facsimile of Desiderata with an English translation by Emma Ramadan, and in 2025 Inpatient Press and Mercurial Editions issued an expanded edition with a foreword by Patti Smith, distributed by Penguin Random House and the MIT Press.

In April 2023, the Paris small press Isti Mirant Stella published Don't Take Care of Yourself. Lettres à Christine. 1974–1983, an edition of 78 letters Mercier Descloux wrote to her childhood friend Christine de Lustrac between 1974 and 1983, accompanied by collages, photographs and drawings from her personal archive. The volume was edited by Christine's daughter Chloé de Lustrac and concentrates on Mercier Descloux's teenage years in Paris, her early trips to New York, and the formation of ZE Records.

== Death ==
In 2003, she was diagnosed with ovarian and colon cancers, from which she died the following year. Fellow no wave musician and ZE labelmate Cristina dedicated a song on the 2004 re-release of her album Sleep It Off to Mercier Descloux, "chère copine in adversity...In loving memory of her talent, her courage, and her kindness."

After her death, Esteban worked with Light in the Attic Records to reissue some of her recordings.

== Albums ==
- Rosa Yemen – Live in N.Y.C July 1978 (1978)
- Press Color (1979)
- Mambo Nassau (1981)
- Lizzy Mercier Descloux (1984) (rereleased as Zulu Rock in 2006, with English recordings of most of the tracks)
- One for the Soul (1986)
- Suspense (1988)
