= He's the Groove =

1980 novelty song by Snuky Tate

"He's the Groove" is a 1979 novelty song by Snuky Tate, the stage persona of American funk and punk rock musician Lionel White. The song is about Pope John Paul II.

== Concept ==
"He's the Groove" is a song which praises Pope John Paul II as being the groove and the man and no dope. It predicts that when he comes to town, everybody will get down. The lyrics are set over a danceable disco beat. At the time of its release, during the 1979 papal visit to the United States, a music video was created featuring White and his backing band performing the song, while archive footage of Pope John Paul II's public appearances intercuts the images.

== Reception ==
When Frank Zappa was a guest in Dr. Demento's radio show he played this song as part of his DJ set. He told the host that he had met Snuky in New York City. Another fan of the song is James Ford of Simian Mobile Disco.
