= SPY Records =

- Founded: 1977
- Founder: John Cale; Jane Friedman; Michel Esteban; Michael Zilkha
- Status: closed in 1980
- Distributor(s): I.R.S. Records
- Genre: Indie rock
- Country of origin: United States
- Location: New York City

SPY Records was a New York based independent music label created in 1977 by John Cale and Jane Friedman.

== History ==
The label was created in 1977 by John Cale and Jane Friedman, who was the manager of Patti Smith, and Cale's girlfriend at the time. It was housed in Cale's 250 West 57th Street office.

The concept of the label was that all artists were to be produced by Cale. The label was distributed by I.R.S. Records Its logo was designed by Michel Esteban, using an image of Cale's eye from his Fear album cover. Cale introduced Esteban to British-born entrepreneur Michael Zilkha, and in 1978 Esteban and Zilkha left SPY Records to found their label, ZE Records.

SPY Records closed in 1980. John Cale then released three albums on ZE Records: Music for a New Society (1982), Caribbean Sunset (1983) and Comes Alive (1984).

== Discography ==
- SPY 001 Harry Toledo & The Rockets - "Busted Chevrolet" EP (7", EP)
- SPY 002 The Necessaries - "You Can Borrow My Car" (7", Single)
- SPY 003 Lester Bangs - "Let It Blurt / Live" (7", Single)
- SPY 004 Model Citizens - "Untitled" (7", EP)
- SPY 005 Marie Et Les Garçons - "Rebop / Attitudes" (7", Single)
- SPY 007 John Cale - "Mercenaries" (7", Single)
- SP004 - John Cale - Sabotage/Live (LP)
