= Tom Spahn =

American musician, composer and musical director

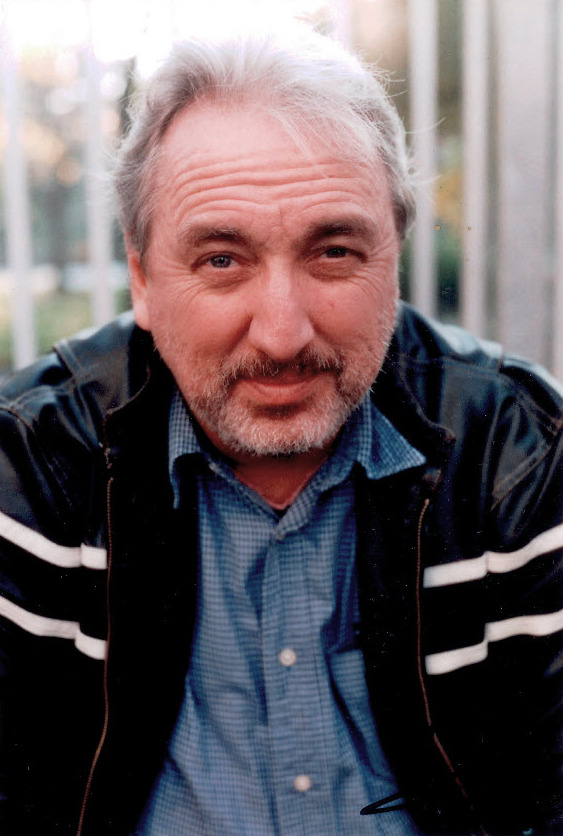
- Tom Spahn in 2016
- Born: Thomas G. Spahn; July 30, 1955 (age 71); Park Forest, Illinois, United States
- Occupations: Musician, Orchestrator, Audio Engineer, Vocal Coach
- Years active: 1973–present

Thomas G. Spahn (born July 30, 1955) is a three-time Emmy Award-winning composer, synthesizer programmer for the 1996 Grammy Award nominated album by Eartha Kitt, "Back in Business", another Emmy Nomination in 2001 for mastering Dizzy South America Tour, is an American musician born in Park Forest, Illinois, and currently residing in New York City. Spahn is a longtime musical director and arranger and has worked with numerous musicians and composers on myriad projects, performances and recordings.

== Early life and education ==
Tom Spahn was born July 30, 1955, and raised in Park Forest, Illinois. 1954 his parents, Bob and Vickie Spahn started the Park Forest Conservatory with Chicago professional musicians like Linus Carroll, Art Hodes and Bill Tinkler teaching music. In high school Jay Hoel, Cecil Gorey and Watt Jones promoted his music projects, a rock band, productions of Jesus Christ Superstar and Godspell. Graduating from High School he was given a full scholarship to Southern Illinois University to play piano with the Big Band and then subsequently toured the country for two years with the Wright Brothers Show Band. With them he started on the Mellotron and rose to pianist-musical director, through his many years of experience he has added the titles orchestrator, vocal coach, composer, producer and audio engineer.

== Career ==
Arriving in New York City in 1975, he began his creative path by playing Blues Piano with Pearl Murray at 96th and 2nd. There he met Ramona Brooks and guided her through her first album produced by Manhattan Records, Neil Portnow and Charles Koppelman. with the Single "Skinnydippin". In 1976, he started his artistic partnership with the legendary performer, Miss Eartha Kitt when he became her primary arranger and musical director for the next nine years. He then met and began a long mentorship and friendship with the deeply respected Broadway orchestrator and vocal coach, Mr. Colin Romoff, who, among his many achievements, taught Gypsy to Merman and Sound of Music to Mary Martin, and rehearsed Marilyn Monroe singing "Happy Birthday, Mr. President" to President John F. Kennedy.

In addition to his work with Miss Kitt, he became the musical director and arranger for the cabaret group Gotham. The group was the first openly gay male trio and described itself as an "Equal Opportunity Employer" by employing a heterosexual pianist. Gotham performed music from the 1930s and 1940s and remained active during the AIDS epidemic. The group became known within New York City's cabaret community..

In 1980 Tom produced Big Bird – Getting Ready for School for Sesame Records at the famous Nola Recording Studios with John Post engineering. in 1985 Jim Czak & John Post invited Tom to operate Studio B at Nola Recording Studios, developing the MIDI studio as MIDI was starting with the Yamaha DX7 and the Kurzweil 250 keyboards.

Over the years his relationship with Sesame Workshop (then Children's Television Workshop), grew as he worked with the musical department. He collaborated with Joe Raposo, Dave Connor and recorded vocal performances for the show at Media Sound and later at Nola Recording. Since 1996 Tom has worked on many of their toy franchise products starting with Tickle Me Elmo. At Sesame Workshop Recording Studios, he has specialised in digital recording standards and mastered of high quality audio through low resolution chips.

Like most people in the entertainment industry, he is a multi-tasker. While doing the aforementioned, he has composed and arranged original underscoring for continuing dramas like the Emmy Award-winning daytime serial, ABC’s All My Children and Guiding Light for Judy Rybak supervising producer.

Currently, he continues his work at Sesame Workshop, and has several projects in development, City of Light that he wrote with Beverly Ross, Hot Ice – with Michael Pace and Francesca James and works with Ray Kennedy (VP of Entertainment, USO – New York) arranging updated versions of the American classic and patriotic repertoire for the 60+ member USO Show Troupe that tour all over the world to support our service men and women in the military.

== Discography ==
- 1976 – Max's Kansas City 1976 – Fender Rhodes, ARP synthesizer, Mini Moog for Phillip Rambow
- 1978 – Ramona Brooks – Manhattan Records
- 1980 – Mr. Men Album
- 1981 – Sesame Street – Big Bird Getting Ready for School – Sesame Records
- 1983 – Roger Hargreaves – Mr Men and Little Miss – Stories 1983
- 1988 – Marlo Thomas – Free To Be...A Family
- 1989 – Jorn Hoel – Love Will Make You do Things That You Know Is Wrong
- 1991 – Blossom Dearie & Mike Renzi – Christmas Spice So Very Nice – synthesizer
- 1991 – Blossom Dearie & Mike Renzi – Tweedledum and Tweedledee – synthesizer, synthesizer programming
- 1992 – Christina Andreou – Opera Made Easy – MET Opera Bookstore
- 1993 – K.T. Sullivan – Crazy World – programming
- 1993 – Aztec Two-Step – Of Age – engineer, keyboards
- 1993 – Laurie Beechman – Time Between the Time – synthesizer
- 1994 – Eartha Kitt – Back in Business – synthesizer, programming
- 1994 – Cynthia Crane - Smoky Bar Songs for the No-Smoking Section – mastering
- 1995 – Cynthia Crane - Blue Rendezvous – mastering
- 1995 – Bonnie Lee Sanders – Bonnie's Bway Moon Song Shoppe – producer, music direction, composer
- 1995 – Barbara Carroll – Everything I Love – editing
- 1996 – Eartha Kitt – Back In Business
- 1996 – Michael Callen – Legacy – The Healing Power of Love – engineer
- 1997 – Cynthia Crane – Cynthia's in Love – mastering
- 1997 – Mike Longo – I Miss You John – mastering
- 1997 – Mike Longo – New York '78 – mastering
- 1997 – Havana Carbo - So I'll Dream You Again – mastering
- 1997 – Diahann Carroll – The Time of My Life – mastering
- 1998 – Joe Kennedy – Accentuate the Positive – mastering
- 1998 – Bonnie Lee Sanders – Seasoned Woman – producer, composer
- 1998 – Joe Kennedy – Strings by Candlelight – editing
- 1998 – Sesame Street – Elmo's Lowdown Hoedown – recording – Sony Wonder CD) LK 63430
- 1999 – Dizzy Gillespie – Con Alma: A Tribute to Dizzy Gillespie – Judy Rafat – mastering
- 2000 – Mike Longo – Explosion - editing, mastering
- 2000 – Judi Silvano – Songs I Wrote, Or Wish I Did – mastering
- 2000 – Joe McMahon Jr. – The Secondhand Heart for Sale: The Songs of Joe McMahon, Jr. – engineer
- 2001 – Dizzy Gillespie – Dizzy in South America: Official U.S. State Department Tour, 1956, Vol. 3 – mastering
- 2001 – Great Cabaret Performances - synthesizer programming
- 2002 – Randy & the Rainbows – Play Ball – engineer
- 2002 – Lisa Richard – Virgin Tracks – engineer
- 2003 – Mike Longo – Live: The Detroit International Jazz Festival - engineer
- 2003 – The 70s Soul Jam, Vol. 1 – mastering
- 2003 – The 70s Soul Jam, Vol. 2 – mastering
- 2003 – The 70s Soul Jam, Vol. 3 – mastering
- 2005 – Kidz Bop Kids – A Very Merry Kidz Bop – mastering
- I'm Confused Therefore, I Am – Cynthia Crane – mastering

== Videography ==
- Sid & Nancy, John Cale
- Something Wild, Jonathan Demme
- Mistress, Galt MacDermot/ Robert De Niro

== Musicals ==
Spahn functioned a musical director and orchestrator or composer on numerous musicals, including the following:

- Battle of the Giants – by Alan Menken and Howard Ashman – musical director and orchestrator
- Real Life Funnies – by Alan Menken and Howard Ashman – musical director and orchestrator
- City of Light – Composer with Beverly Ross
- Walk on Water – composer Danny Wolf
- Cairo – musical director and orchestrator
- Sam Gray – musical director and orchestrator – Bonnie Sanders
- Broadway Moon – musical director and orchestrator
- The Road to Hollywood, by Michael Pace & Rob Preston – musical director and orchestrator

== Vocal coach ==
Over the years Spahn has been a vocal coach to the following notables

- Divine for "Hair Spray – The Movie"
- Eartha Kitt
- Nancy LaMott
- Ramona Brooks
- Gotham
- Ray Kennedy – FDR Drive
