= PolyGram =

German-Dutch global record label (1962–1999)

PolyGram N.V.
- Formerly: Grammophon-Philips Group (1962–1972)
- Type: Public subsidiary
- Traded as: AEX: PLG (1989–1998); NYSE: PLG (until 1998)
- Industry: Music; Film; Entertainment
- Founded: 1962; 64 years ago
- Founder: Deutsche Grammophon; Philips Phonografische Industrie
- Defunct: 1999; 27 years ago
- Fate: List: Acquired by Seagram and folded into Universal Studios; Music operations folded into Universal Music Group. Label still used by UMG's PolyGram Entertainment and for some of its label divisions in certain regions.; Film and television assets, plus international video operations folded into Universal Pictures. Post-April 1996–1999 PolyGram Filmed Entertainment catalog currently owned by Universal Pictures. (part of Comcast); North American distribution assets (including domestic video operations) were sold to USA Networks.; Pre-April 1996 PolyGram Filmed Entertainment catalog sold to Metro-Goldwyn-Mayer (part of Amazon); ITC Entertainment catalog sold to Carlton Communications.
- Successors: Universal Music Group; Universal Pictures (NBCUniversal/Comcast)
- Headquarters: Baarn, Netherlands
- Owners: Siemens (50%, 1962–1988) Philips (50%, 1962–1988)
- Parent: Philips (75%, 1988–1998)

PolyGram N.V. was a Dutch-German multinational major music record label and entertainment company formerly based in the Netherlands. It was founded in 1962 as the Grammophon-Philips Group by Dutch corporation Philips and German corporation Siemens, to be a holding for their record companies, and was renamed "PolyGram" in 1972. The name was chosen to reflect the Siemens interest Polydor Records and the Philips interest Phonogram Records. The company traced its origins through Deutsche Grammophon back to the inventor of the flat disc gramophone, Emil Berliner.

Later on, PolyGram expanded into the largest global entertainment company, creating film and television divisions. In May 1998, it was sold to the alcoholic distiller Seagram which owned film, television and music company Universal Studios. PolyGram's music operations were thereby folded into Universal Music Group, and its film and television operations were folded into Universal Pictures, which had been both Seagram successors of MCA Inc. When the newly formed entertainment division of Seagram faced financial difficulties, it was sold to Vivendi, and MCA became known as Universal Studios, as Seagram ceased to exist. Vivendi remains the majority owner of the Universal Music Group (while the film and television division was sold to NBCUniversal) until 2021. In February 2017, UMG revived the company under the name of PolyGram Entertainment, which currently serves as their film and television division.

== History ==
=== Hollandsche Decca Distributie (HDD), 1929–1950 ===
In 1929, Decca Records (London) licensed record shop owner H.W. Van Zoelen as a distributor in the Netherlands. By 1931, his company Hollandsche Decca Distributie (HDD) had become exclusive Decca distributor for all of the Netherlands and its colonies. Over the course of the 1930s, HDD put together its own facilities for A&R, recording, and manufacturing.

HDD was commercially successful during World War II because of the absence of American and British competition. Van Zoelen wanted to sell to Philips so that HDD would have sufficient financial backing when their major competitors returned after the war. This led Philips to purchase HDD in 1942.

In the mid-20th century, the majority of large recording companies manufactured both gramophones and records; Philips CEO Anton Philips noted the risk in creating gramophones without an interest in music recording and record manufacture, and that Radio Corporation of America (RCA) had merged with the Victor Talking Machine Company in 1929 for this reason. Philips' labs were developing magnetic tape and LPs, and they could support eventual new formats, although other record companies were notably unenthusiastic about experimenting with new formats.

After the war, Philips built a large factory in Doetinchem to produce 78 rpm records. Recording took place in Hilversum, whereas development took place in Eindhoven.

=== Philips Phonografische Industrie (PPI), 1950–1962 ===
In the 1940s, the record business was spread out within Philips: research in the Eindhoven labs, development elsewhere in Eindhoven, recording in Hilversum, manufacturing in Doetinchem, distribution from Amsterdam, and exports from Eindhoven. During the late 1940s, Philips combined its various music businesses into Philips Phonografische Industrie (PPI), a wholly owned subsidiary. In June 1950, PPI launched the Philips record label.

PPI's early growth was based on alliances. A merger was first proposed with Decca of London in late 1945, but was rejected by Edward Lewis, Decca's owner. (PolyGram finally acquired Decca in 1980.)

In the early 1950s, Philips set itself the goal of making PPI the largest record company in Europe.

PPI's second attempt at a merger was with Deutsche Grammophon Gesellschaft (DGG). DGG, owned by Siemens AG, and well known for its classical repertoire, had been the German licensee for Decca from 1935. DGG also owned Polydor Records. Shortly after PPI was founded it had made a formal alliance with DGG to manufacture each other's records, coordinate releases, and refrain from poaching each other's artists or bidding against each other for new talent. PPI and DGG finally merged in 1962.

The alliance with DGG still left PPI without repertoire in Britain or the United States. But in 1951, after Columbia had failed to renew its international distribution agreement with EMI, PPI agreed to distribute Columbia recordings outside the United States. Columbia became PPI's distributor within the US. This agreement ran until 1961 when Columbia set up its own European network. PPI signed a worldwide distribution deal with Mercury Records in 1961. PPI's parent company Philips, through its U.S. affiliate Consolidated Electronics Industries Corp (a.k.a. Conelco), acquired Mercury in 1962.

PPI built or bought factories in smaller countries. In 1962, PPI had a large factory in Baarn and factories in France, Britain, Denmark, Norway, Spain, Italy, Egypt, Nigeria, and Brazil.

PPI played an important role in the introduction of the long-playing vinyl record to Europe. Columbia introduced their LP record in 1948, and Philips presented its first LP at a record retailers' convention in 1949. Philips' commitment to LP technology was an important factor in its 1951–1961 deal with Columbia.

=== GPG and PolyGram, 1962–1980 ===
In 1962, PPI and DGG formed the Grammophon-Philips Group (GPG) as a joint-venture holding company, with Philips taking a 50% share in DGG and Siemens a 50% share in PPI. In 1971, the UK record labels of Philips, Fontana, Mercury, and Vertigo were amalgamated into a new company called Phonogram, Ltd. In 1972, Grammophon-Philips Group reorganized all its operations and was renamed The PolyGram Group (in some countries, like Argentina, its name was Phonogram), of which Philips and Siemens each owned 50%. In 1977, both organizations merged operationally, integrating the recording, manufacturing, distribution and marketing into a single organization.

The various record labels within PolyGram continued to operate separately. PolyGram gave its labels, as A&R organizations, great autonomy.

After the merger, PolyGram began to move into the US and UK markets, and did so by a process of both formation and acquisition: Polydor Records established its American operations, Polydor Incorporated in 1969, Mercury Record Productions (US) was acquired in 1972 from sister company North American Philips Corp., and became Phonogram, Inc. MGM Records and Verve (US) were acquired in 1972. Subsequent PolyGram acquisitions included those of RSO (UK) in 1975, a 50% stake in Casablanca (US) in 1977 (with the remaining 50% in 1980), Pickwick in 1978, and Decca (UK) in 1980 (the latter acquisition basically brought PolyGram full circle, see the HDD section above). PolyGram acquired United Distribution Corporation (UDC) in 1973, and changed its name to Phonodisc, Inc., and signed international distribution deals with MCA and 20th Century Records in 1976.

In the late 1950s and early 1960s, Philips had been at work on a new consumer magnetic tape format for music. The Philips Compact Cassette was introduced in 1963. It was small and could play longer than an LP. In 1965 the cassette accounted for 3% of revenues, growing in 1968 to 8% and in 1970 to 10.6%.

In the late 1960s, and through the 1970s, GPG/PolyGram diversified into film and television production and home video. RSO's successes included Saturday Night Fever and Grease. PolyGram's highly successful marketing during the disco craze included the Casablanca FilmWorks production Thank God It's Friday (1978) and its associated soundtrack. During the boom in disco, PolyGram's US market share had grown from 5% to 20%. This can also be attributed to multi-million selling albums and 45s by the Bee Gees, Donna Summer, the Village People, Andy Gibb, Kool & the Gang, and rock band Kiss. For a short while in the late 1970s, it was the world's largest record company.

In 1969, PolyGram established a direct mail-order business in the UK, Britannia Music Club, which ran till 2007.

=== Reorganization, 1980–1999 ===
Before 1978, PolyGram was losing money. When US operations were running at full capacity, PolyGram expanded aggressively, and would press large quantities of records without knowing the demand. In late 1979, PolyGram was caught off guard by the sudden end of the popularity of disco music, leaving it with an underutilized distribution network, profligate labels, and over optimistic product orders. PolyGram's Casablanca label was known for management spending on lavish industry parties and luxury cars. After 1980, PolyGram's losses had spiraled upwards of US$220 million.

Another contributing factor to PolyGram's financial woes was the massive failure of the big budget musical Sgt. Pepper's Lonely Heart's Club Band (1978). The film starred the Bee Gees and Peter Frampton at the height of their popularity, and featured the Beatles covers by them as well as Aerosmith, Billy Preston, and Earth, Wind & Fire. The film was highly anticipated to surpass the box office success of both the Saturday Night Fever and Grease, mostly due to its popular music stars. The soundtrack LP, based on only advance orders, was released triple platinum. The movie was released to poor reviews and died at the box office. Despite its triple platinum start, the soundtrack LP's sales bombed after the film's release. In turn, record dealers flooded PolyGram with returned LPs. The resulting losses nearly wiped out the profits the company had made on both the Saturday Night Fever and Grease soundtracks. The company took further loses when the disco craze ended in 1979 and record sales for both the Bee Gees and Casablanca's Village People plummeted. PolyGram also experienced losses with the defection of Casablanca's Donna Summer to newly formed Geffen Records as well as the dropping of Andy Gibb, whose personal problems with cocaine and alcohol began to affect his recording career, from RSO. Summer and the Bee Gees also had legal disputes with their labels which further complicated matters. Summer ended her contract with PolyGram in 1980, and was awarded the rights to her songwriting catalog by the courts; she owed them one more album, and finished out her contract by recording her album She Works Hard For The Money (from which the title track was a huge hit in 1983).

In 1980, after PolyGram bought the other 50% of Casablanca Records and Filmworks, PolyGram renamed its existing Casablanca Records & Filmworks unit as PolyGram Pictures with Peter Guber becoming chairman of the company. During the late 1980s and early 1990s, PolyGram continued to invest in a diversified film unit with the purchases of individual production companies.

In 1981, Philips executive Jan Timmer became a member of the Group Management of PolyGram and was appointed president and chief executive officer of newly formed parent company, PolyGram International Ltd. in 1983. He cut the workforce from 13,000 to 7,000, reduced PolyGram's LP and cassette plants from eighteen to five, and decreased the company's dependence on superstars by spreading the repertoire across different genres and nurturing national and regional talent. Also by 1983, PolyGram's U.S. roster of labels included:

- Polydor
- Mercury
- London
- London/FFRR
- Casablanca (until 1986, later to be reincarnated in 1994)
- RSO
- De-Lite
- Riva
- Threshold (owned by the Moody Blues)
- Total Experience (founded by Lonnie Simmons, from 1981 to 1984)
- Atlanta Artists (founded by Cameo lead singer Larry Blackmon)

...which were all consolidated into PolyGram Records, Inc. (now UMG Recordings, Inc.) In 1981, PolyGram launched domestic television syndication unit PolyGram Television (unrelated to the latter day incarnation that became Universal Worldwide Television in 1997), but it was soon folded after two years.

Under its newly reorganized form, PolyGram decided to discontinue Philips as a pop and rock label in the UK and much of Europe, though it was still frequently issued records in France and South East Asia, where it issued many albums and singles by Chinese and Hong Kong pop artists. The majority of PolyGram's rock and pop music signings went to Mercury and Polydor. Philips became part of PolyGram Classics as a classical music label along with Decca Records and Deutsche Grammophon. By 1985, PolyGram had returned to profitability.

Wing Records was reincarnated in 1987 and became a very popular label over the following years, spawning the careers of Tony! Toni! Toné! and former Miss America, Vanessa Williams; the label was discontinued in the mid-1990s. Fontana was revived in the U.S. in 1989, but only for a short while. Today, Fontana Distribution is an independent label distribution unit of Universal Music Group. Vertigo Records still remained a rare U.S. PolyGram label, as most of its music was from Europe.

In April 1982, PolyGram assumed operational and managerial control of 20th Century Fox Records from its similarly named parent, which had just recently been bought out by oil magnate Marvin Davis, who was not interested in keeping the record company. The assets of the former 20th Century Fox Records were fully acquired by the firm in July 1982, and subsequently were consolidated with the Casablanca label.

After an attempted 1983 merger with Warner Elektra Atlantic failed, Philips bought 40% of PolyGram from Siemens, acquiring the remaining 10% in 1987.

In 1985, former CBS and Columbia executive Dick Asher was named president and CEO of PolyGram. Asher was formerly the attorney for Don Kirshner's Aldon Music music publishing company.

The CD, invented by Philips and Sony, helped greatly in boosting the company's sales and market share. PolyGram's strength in classical music helped greatly, as many of the CD's early adopters were classical music lovers. Total US sales of CDs were $1 million in 1983, $334 million in 1990 and $943 million in 2000. Total UK sales were $300,000 in 1983, $51 million in 1990 and $202 million in 2000. The CD increased PolyGram's profit margin from 4-6% in the mid-1980s to 7-9% by the early 1990s. As well, videos were distributed by PolyGram Video.

In 1988, Philips acquired the remaining 50% of PolyGram from long-time partner Siemens and later in 1989, floated 16% of PolyGram on the Amsterdam stock exchange, valuing the whole company at $5.6 billion. PolyGram embarked on a new program of acquisitions, including A&M and Island Records in 1989, Swedish company Polar Music which held the rights to the ABBA catalogue, Motown and Def Jam in 1994 and Rodven (Venezuela) in 1995.

In 1989, under president and chief executive officer David G. Fine, PolyGram expanded significantly through major acquisitions, including Island Records for about US$300 million and A&M Records for roughly US$500 million. That same year, PolyGram also broadened its music publishing holdings by acquiring the Welk Music Group, Sweden Music, and the Island Group. These acquisitions helped position PolyGram for its initial public offering later that year, when it became one of the first major record companies to be publicly traded independently of a parent conglomerate. In May 1990, Fine was named to succeed Jan D. Timmer as chairman of PolyGram N.V., with executive vice president Alain Levy scheduled to assume the CEO position at year's end.

In 1990, after acquiring both Island and A&M, Alain Levy, (then) executive vice-president of PolyGram N.V., re-organized the U.S. operations of PolyGram Records, Inc. into a new expanded conglomerate: PolyGram Group Distribution, Inc. In addition to overseeing the sales, marketing, manufacturing and distribution of music and video products created by PolyGram, PGD was also responsible for supervising a number of other divisions within PolyGram (U.S.) such as: PolyGram Music Group, PolyGram Video, PolyMedia, PolyGram Special Markets, PolyGram Merchandising, Independent Label Sales (ILS) and New Media & Business Development.

PolyGram and Granada TV formed a joint venture, Big Picture Productions, in 1990 as a music programing firm which, at Cannes in 1990, purchased exclusive international distribution rights to Brown Sugar (The two-hour special featured black female performers and was hosted by Billy Dee Williams) from the New York–based Gene David Group.

In June 1991, Alain Levy was promoted to worldwide president and CEO of PolyGram N.V.

In 1993, PolyGram purchased the video arm of Virgin Group from General Electric Capital for $5.6 million and remodeled the label as Vision Video ltd.

In 1995, PolyGram purchased ITC Entertainment for $156 million.

=== Sale to Seagram and divestiture (1998–1999) ===
In 1996, Cor Boonstra became CEO of Philips; by the time he took over, Philips was seen as a bloated company, laden with too many layers of management and unrelated companies that they could not leverage effectively. As a result, Boonstra began to sell or dispose of various non-core assets. While Philips began to withdraw from other media activities, Boonstra denied that PolyGram was for sale. However, by early 1998, he had changed his attitude, instead deciding to pursue a manufacturing-only business plan. (In hindsight, analysts have pointed out how Philips ultimately benefitted from the manufacture and sale of blank CDs, which played a significant part in the music piracy that began to affect the industry in the early 2000s.)

After weeks of speculation, on May 22, 1998, Philips announced that they would sell PolyGram to Seagram for $10 billion. Some of the reasons cited for the deal were a lack of pop hits from the music side of the company, and an equal lack of box-office successes from the film side. Alain Levy resigned as CEO of PolyGram on June 23 to prepare for the merger, and the deal was closed on December 10, 1998, with PolyGram's operations folding into Universal Pictures and Universal Music Group.

Seagram however, was only interested in PolyGram's music division, and in October 1998 they announced that they would begin divesting PolyGram's entertainment assets, while the remainder would be folded into Universal Pictures. Prior to this announcement, the company announced the sale of their 75% stake in children's distributor Abbey Home Entertainment back to its original founders and the acquisition of Astrion plc. On October 23, Metro-Goldwyn-Mayer (MGM) agreed to purchase PolyGram Filmed Entertainment's pre-April 1996 library for $250 million, which included over 1,300 films from various assets PolyGram had acquired within that point, but did not include the ITC Entertainment library, which was sold on January 19, 1999 to Carlton Communications for £91 million. On April 8, 1999, USA Networks announced they would purchase the PolyGram Filmed Entertainment domestic division (including PolyGram Video's US and Canada operation), among other assets. After the sale, the divisions were renamed USA Films and USA Home Entertainment respectively. The assets of Slash Records and London Records were sold to Warner Music Group. What remained of PolyGram was folded into both Universal Music Group and Universal Pictures.

On February 10, 1999, Universal announced that they would pull out of their CIC Video and United International Pictures ventures with Paramount Pictures and rename the PolyGram Filmed Entertainment international division (including PolyGram Video's international operation) as Universal Pictures International (with PolyGram Video's international operation being renamed Universal Pictures Video). Whilst the home video division rebranding was successful (with CIC being renamed Paramount Home Entertainment International toward the end of the year), the theatrical division rebranding would prove to be a failure, as films from the rebranded Universal Pictures International flopped at the box office, the company therefore announced in October 1999 that their operations would be downgraded to the home video market only and renewed their UIP deal with Paramount for five years, the remains of PolyGram's theatrical assets would then be folded into United International Pictures. Mickey Blue Eyes would become the last film distributed under the ex-PolyGram unit.

The PolyGram name now survives via reissue of music under the Polydor Records label as well as a publishing arm of Universal Music Publishing Group. The Japanese branches of the PolyGram labels that were absorbed to form Universal Music Japan and were rebranded: Polydor remained until 2002, when it merged with the Universal label to form Universal J; Kitty Records and Mercury remained until 2000, when they merged and became the short-lived Kitty MME, which later in 2002, moved some artists to Universal J and in 2004, became Universal Sigma.

== Notable labels ==
- A&M Records (acquired in October 1989)
- Casablanca Records (fully acquired in 1980)
- Decca Records (British) (acquired in January 1980)
- Def Jam Recordings (acquired in June 1994)
- Deutsche Grammophon
- Fontana Records
- Island Records (acquired in August 1989)
- London Records
- Mercury Records
  - Mercury Nashville
- Motown (distribution in September 1991 and acquired in August 1993)
- Philips Records
- Phonogram Inc.
- Polar Music (acquired in 1989)
- Polydor Records
- Slash Records
- Total Experience Records
- Vertigo Records
- Verve Records

== See also ==
- List of record labels
- Working Title Films
- PolyGram Filmed Entertainment
- Chocolate City Records

== Sources ==
- Bakker, Gerben. "The Making of a Music Multinational: The International Strategy of PolyGram, 1945-1988." Business History Review 80:1 (Spring 2006), pp. 81–123. (preprint)
