= Tom Savarese =

American DJ

Tom Savarese is a DJ best known for his role in the 1970s disco music scene.

== Biography ==
Savarese was born on April 26, 1944, in New York City, and grew up in the Bronx neighborhood. He attended Fordham University.

Savarese began his career as a DJ in 1969, playing at apartment and house parties. Over time he became the full-time professional Disco DJ, reportedly one of the first in the US, and worked on music remixes for record labels in NYC. By the late-1970s, Savarese was interviewed as an expert in the disco music scene by major publications, including the New York Times and Billboard Magazine, calling Savarese the "key New York Disco DJ" in 1977. Billboard Magazine named Savarese the New York DJ of the Year that year, as well as national DJ of the year in 1976 and 1977. Savarese' remixes also charted in the top 20 tracks of the New York Daily News disco charts.

During this era, Savarese mostly played at "12 west" club, and famously turned down the opportunity to become the first DJ to play and hold residence at the club "Studio 54". He was also one of the first DJs to play live during New York City fashion runway shows.
