= The Pitchfork Review =

Defunct quarterly music magazine

- The Pitchfork Review cover, no. 1
- Editor: J.C. Gabel; Jessica Hopper
- Categories: Music magazine
- Frequency: Quarterly
- Circulation: Limited to 10,000
- Publisher: Christopher Kaskie
- Founder: Ryan Schreiber, Chris Kaskie, Michael Renaud
- Founded: 2013
- First issue: December 14, 2013
- Final issue: November 2016
- Company: Pitchfork Media
- Country: United States
- Based in: Chicago, Illinois
- Website: web.archive.org/web/20131209075550/http://thepitchforkreview.com/ (Archived)

The Pitchfork Review was an American quarterly music magazine, available in print only, that included long-form feature stories, photography, and illustrations, and also included selected recent pieces from Pitchfork's online content. The magazine ended after 11 issues in November 2016.

== Launch ==
In December 2013, Pitchfork Media debuted The Pitchfork Review, a quarterly print journal focused on long-form music writing and design-focused content. J.C. Gabel, its first editor, had been the publisher of The Chicagoan and founding publisher of Stop Smiling.

According to the New York Times, Pitchfork Media planned a limited-edition quarterly publication of about 10,000 copies of each issue, perfect bound, and printed on glossy, high-quality 8-by-10¼ paper. It was expected that about two-thirds of the content would be original, with the remaining one-third recycled from the Pitchfork website.

Covering the launch, the International Business Times likened the publication's literary aspirations to The New Yorker and Paris Review, and editorialized:

But as impressive as it is, is it a step back in time for a brand more known for looking ahead? Perhaps, but that doesn't mean it's a step backwards; rather, it can be seen as a show of confidence. And there is reason to believe it could turn a profit. Print still has a currency, in terms of perception and ad revenue, and a well-produced print glossy can still resonate with readers in a way that pixels can't.

The Hollywood Reporter quoted the magazine's creative director as saying that moving into print was "not a nostalgic move, because print has never left our lives," adding that Pitchfork's goal was to "create a permanent object of a moment through music journalism and documentation... a compendium of what we'll remember from the last few months and what's going through our minds as music fans right now."

Converse was secured as an exclusive advertising partner for the first four issues, and agreed to sponsor a series of 7-inch records included with the 2014 issues of the publication, beginning with No. 2.

== Issues ==
=== 2013–2014 issues ===
==== No. 1 (Winter 2013) ====
The inaugural issue of The Pitchfork Review included original articles about Van Morrison, Otis Redding, Glenn Danzig, and the history of the jukebox, as well as a retrospective on the glory days of the U.K. weekly music press.

==== No. 2 (Spring 2014) ====
Among its original pieces, the second issue included a feature article by Franklin Bruno about Game Theory's frontman and songwriter Scott Miller, who died in 2013. Also featured were an appreciation of Ellen Willis, and articles about Kate Bush, Stanley Kubrick, Sun Kil Moon, and Holger Czukay.

A 7-inch split single was included with the second issue, with two exclusive tracks by Kurt Vile and the Lovetones, "Off with His Tongue!" and "Let's Bury the Hatchet," and a B-side, "Meg's Dreamcatcher," from Philadelphia-based punk band Watery Love.

==== No. 3 (Summer 2014) ====
The third issue, which went on sale July 18, 2014, featured articles about Jason Molina, Don Drummond and Margarita Mahfood, John Fahey, and Joe Tex, as well as short pieces on Kanye West, Weezer, and others. An oral history of Elliott Smith was reprinted from Pitchfork's online content. The issue included a 7-inch split single by King Tuff and Vermont-based band The Lentils.

==== No. 4 (Fall 2014) ====
In issue four, articles included a profile of Australian songwriter Courtney Barnett, a history of the recording of David Bowie's Low, an oral history of a New York electronic dance music club, and Michael Galinsky on the "America underground 1988–93." The issue included a 7-inch split single by Zola Jesus and The Tea Heads.

=== 2015 issues ===
==== No. 5 (Winter 2015) ====
Issue five included an extended interview with Björk, an oral history of the band Jawbreaker, and a feature on the origins and "queer legacy" of The B-52's.

==== No. 6 (Spring 2015) ====
Two collectible covers were printed for issue six, which included interviews with Antony and Lucinda Williams, a biography of Lizzy Mercier Descloux, and articles on the abstraction of rap, DJ Rashad and Teklife, and the world of Branson, Missouri.

==== No. 7 (Summer 2015) ====
The seventh issue featured a cover story on Grace Jones, interviews with Jeff Tweedy and Sufjan Stevens, an article by Charles Aaron on Goodie Mob, and a photo spread of San Francisco's 1970s art punk scene.

==== No. 8 (Fall 2015) ====
Publication of the eighth issue, originally expected by December 15, 2015, was delayed to mid-January 2016. The issue featured a cover story on Prince's Dirty Mind, a guide to musicians' final resting places in Memphis, and articles on Los Crudos, TV on the Radio, Alice Coltrane, and life as a proto-punk in 1976.
