= Alain Levy =

French entertainment industry executive

Alain Levy is an entertainment industry executive. He was born in Metz, France, on 19 December 1946.

== Biography ==
He graduated from the Ecole des Mines with a Bachelor of Science in engineering in 1970. He received his MBA from Wharton Business School of the University of Pennsylvania in 1972.

== Early career ==
=== CBS 1972-1984 ===
Levy joined CBS Records International in 1972, and stayed until 1984. He began his career as the chief of staff in the office of CBS Records International president Walter Yetnikoff, before moving to Paris as head of manufacturing and logistics. In 1976 he was appointed vice president of marketing in Europe and later also put in charge of management of CBS Italy. In 1979 he was promoted to CEO of CBS France.

=== PolyGram France 1984-1988 ===
In 1984 Levy moved to PolyGram as CEO of its French operations, and expanded the label into the largest music company in France, with market share of 35%, in just four years.

=== PolyGram Worldwide 1988-1998 ===
In 1988 he moved to London to be executive vice president of PolyGram in charge of its worldwide pop marketing and music publishing activities.

In 1990, he led the firm's negotiations to buy Island Records and A&M Records, which brought to PolyGram top-selling artists, as U2 and Sting. He integrated A&M and Island into the Group, using this opportunity to regroup all labels into one distribution company and also add video. In addition to his marketing role, he took over the management of PolyGram's new operations in the U.S., and then reorganized PolyGram Records (U.S.) into a new large-scale venture: PolyGram Group Distribution, Inc., which oversaw the operations of the United States divisions of PolyGram including PolyGram Music Group, PolyGram Video, PolyMedia, PolyGram Special Markets, PolyGram Merchandising, Independent Label Sales, etc. Overall, PGD, Inc. oversaw the distribution, marketing and sales of the audio and video products belonging to PolyGram in the United States. That year, PolyGram was floated on the Amsterdam and New York stock exchange at a valuation of 2B$.

In 1991, Levy was promoted to worldwide President and CEO of PolyGram N.V. overseeing all global business/entertainment operations for PolyGram including: PolyGram Music Group and PolyGram Filmed Entertainment. He spent the next seven years turning the primarily European music group into a worldwide entertainment force that sold one out of every five albums and released movie hits such as Four Weddings and a Funeral and Fargo.

== Later career ==
=== Music Business ===
In 1992 Levy acquired Motown and Def Jam further diversifying PolyGram's musical slate. He then spent the next few years consolidating the firm's music strategy: balanced multinational operations, investment in local content, consolidating the global marketing operations and prioritizing profit over market share.

By the mid-1990s PolyGram was the most profitable of all the music majors and the number one music company in the world.

=== Film Business ===
Beginning in 1992, after observing a gradual flattening in the music sales, Levy led the company's expansion into the international movie business with the establishment of PolyGram Filmed Entertainment. PFE produced and distributed films such as Four Weddings and a Funeral, Trainspotting, Bean, Fargo, and Dead Man Walking. PolyGram Filmed Entertainment became the biggest European owned studio with sales in excess of 1B$ and distribution in 26 countries.

=== Philips Board and PolyGram Exit ===
From 1992 to 1998 Levy also sat on the Board of Management of PHILIPS, and played a key part in developing world-class software and content while being one of the industry leaders in hardware. In 1996, Philips CEO Jan Timmer left the company and was replaced by Cor Boonstraa. Over the next few years the strategy of the company shifted; in 1998 Philips left the software side to focus on hardware. PolyGram was then sold to Seagram for 11B$ and Levy left the company.

=== Investments in digital 1999-2001 ===
After leaving PolyGram, Levy was senior advisor at McKinsey and made seed investments in a number of different media companies mainly in the Internet space.

=== EMI Music 2001-2007 ===
From 2001 to 2007, Levy was the chairman and CEO of EMI Music worldwide.

For the first six months of his tenure Levy led the consolidation of EMI and Virgin Group into one company with distinct content streams and branding, resulting in overheads savings of £250 million on an annual basis. He then focused on changing the strategy to the changing context of digital, shifting EMI from a content-driven to a consumer-focused company.

Over the next few years Levy invested over £100m in technology both inside the company and vis a vis the consumer. EMI was the first media company to digitize its content and to start discussions and negotiations with Apple regarding its iTunes launch, while at the same time leading the debate over digital rights management.

During this time EMI adopted consumer segmentation, market research practices and investment measuring techniques in its marketing operations. It also built a powerful global marketing operation that supported the success of primarily English speaking artists globally. While undergoing this transformation, the company kept its focus on its artists and their music, breaking to worldwide recognition major acts such as Norah Jones, Coldplay and Keith Urban.

In 2006, Levy startled an audience at London Business School with the statement: "The CD as it is right now is dead." In early 2007, EMI was sold to Terra Firma and Levy left the company.

=== Banijay 2008-2009 ===
In 2008 and 2009 Levy was Senior Advisor to Banijay, a new business enterprise acquiring independent TV production companies from around the world and links them in exchanging and adapting formats., backed by the Arnaud, Agnelli, and d’Agostini families.

=== Algean Group 2013 ===
In September 2013 he was appointed Executive Chairman of Algean Group, a group of companies that operates in travel, property and marketing strategy consulting with a focus in new media and technology. Algean Group's member companies include; Omni Apico, Seez Travel, Algean Property, Private Events by Omni Apico, Quintessentially Hellas

=== Personal Data ===
Children: Arnaud Levy - 28 August 1970, Jerome Levy - 10 November 1972, Victor Levy - 7 February 1985, Charlotte Levy - 23 June 1997, Cleo Levy - 1 December 1998, Nathaniel Levy - 29 March 2004
