= Witt (poetry collection) =

Book by Patti Smith

- Author: Patti Smith
- Cover artist: Robert Mapplethorpe
- Language: English
- Genre: Poetry
- Publisher: Gotham Book Mart
- Publication date: 1973
- Publication place: United States
- Media type: Hardcover, Paperback
- Pages: 45
- ISBN: 978-0-910664-33-2
- OCLC: 2913612

Witt is a poetry collection by Patti Smith, published in 1973.

== Contents ==
1. "Notice"
2. "Witt"
3. "October 20"
4. "Dragnet"
5. "Dream of Rimbaud"
6. "To Remember Debbie Denise"
7. "Sonnet"
8. "Mock Death"
9. "What Makes Ruda Ivory"
10. "Rape"
11. "Georgia O'Keeffe"
12. "Mustang"
13. "Conch"
14. "Soul Jive"
15. "Picasso Laughing"
16. "Gibralto"
17. "Precious Little"
18. "Notice 2"
19. "Judith Revisited"
20. "Balance"
21. "Prayer"
22. "Translators"
