= Avant-funk =

Subgenre of funk music

- Other names: Punk-funk; mutant disco; agit-funk
- Stylistic origins: Funk; avant-garde; disco; punk rock; art rock; progressive rock; Eurodisco; no wave; dub
- Cultural origins: Late 1960s, United States
- Derivative forms: House; drum and bass

Other topics
- Avant-pop; no wave; post-punk; dance-punk; free funk; thrash funk; punk jazz; art punk

Avant-funk (also known as mutant disco) is a music style in which artists combine funk or disco rhythms with an avant-garde or art rock mentality. Its most prominent era occurred in the late 1970s and 1980s among post-punk and no wave acts who embraced black dance music.

== Characteristics ==
Artists described as "avant-funk" or "mutant disco" have blended elements from styles such as funk, punk, disco, freeform jazz and dub. Some motifs of the style in the 1970s and 1980s included "neurotic slap-bass" and "guttural pseudo-sinister vocals," as well as "Eurodisco rhythms; synthesizers used to generate not pristine, hygienic textures, but poisonous, noisome filth; Burroughs’ cut-up technique applied to found voices." According to critic Simon Reynolds, the movement was animated by the notion that "rock's hopes of enjoying a future beyond mere antiquarianism depends on assimilating the latest rhythmic innovations from black dance music."

Musicologist Simon Frith described avant-funk as an application of progressive rock mentality to rhythm rather than melody and harmony. Reynolds described avant-funk as "difficult dance music" and a kind of psychedelia in which "oblivion was to be attained not through rising above the body, rather through immersion in the physical, self loss through animalism."

== History ==
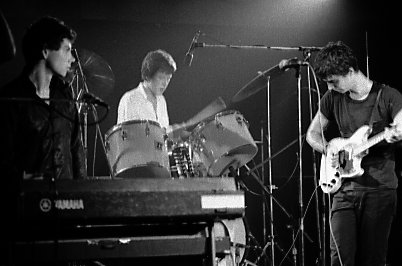
Talking Heads combined funk with elements of punk and art rock.

Early acts who have retrospectively been described with the term include German krautrock band Can, American funk artists Sly Stone and George Clinton, and jazz trumpeter Miles Davis. Herbie Hancock's 1973 album Sextant was called an "uncompromising avant-funk masterpiece" by Paste. Jazz saxophonist Ornette Coleman led the avant-funk band Prime Time in the 1970s and 1980s. Guitarist James "Blood" Ulmer, who performed with Coleman in the 1970s, was described by The New Yorker as "one of avant-funk's masters."

According to Reynolds, a pioneering wave of avant-funk artists came in the late 1970s, when post-punk artists (including A Certain Ratio, the Pop Group, Gang of Four, Bush Tetras, Defunkt, Public Image Ltd, Liquid Liquid, and James Chance, as well as Arthur Russell, Cabaret Voltaire, Talking Heads, DAF, and 23 Skidoo) embraced black dance music styles such as funk and disco. Reynolds noted these artists' preoccupations with issues such as alienation, repression and the technocracy of Western modernity. The all-female avant-funk group ESG formed in The Bronx during this era. The artists of the late 1970s New York no wave scene, including James Chance, explored avant-funk influenced by Ornette Coleman. The 1981 album My Life in the Bush of Ghosts by Brian Eno and David Byrne was described as a masterpiece of avant-funk by Paste. The New York label ZE Records released the influential compilation Mutant Disco: A Subtle Discolation of the Norm in 1981, coining a new label for this style of hybridized dance music blending punk and disco.

Later groups such as Skinny Puppy, Chakk, and 400 Blows represented later waves of the style. By the mid-1980s, avant-funk had dissipated as white alternative groups turned away from the dancefloor. Many of its original practitioners instead became a part of the UK's first wave of house music, including Cabaret Voltaire's Richard H. Kirk and Graham Massey of Biting Tongues (and later of 808 State). Reynolds compared the UK's rave music and jungle scenes of the early 1990s to a "reactivation" of avant-funk, calling it "a populist vanguard, a lumpen bohemia that weirdly mashed together the bad-trippy sounds of art school funk-mutation with a plebeian pill-gobbling rapacity". Avant-funk influenced 1990s drum and bass producers such as 4hero and A Guy Called Gerald.

== See also ==
- Harmolodics
- Dance-punk

== Bibliography ==
- Wodtke, Larissa (2023). Dance-Punk: 33 1/3 Genre Series. Bloomsbury Academic. ISBN 978-1501381867.
