= Adam Kidron =

British-born music producer, entrepreneur and Chief Executive Officer

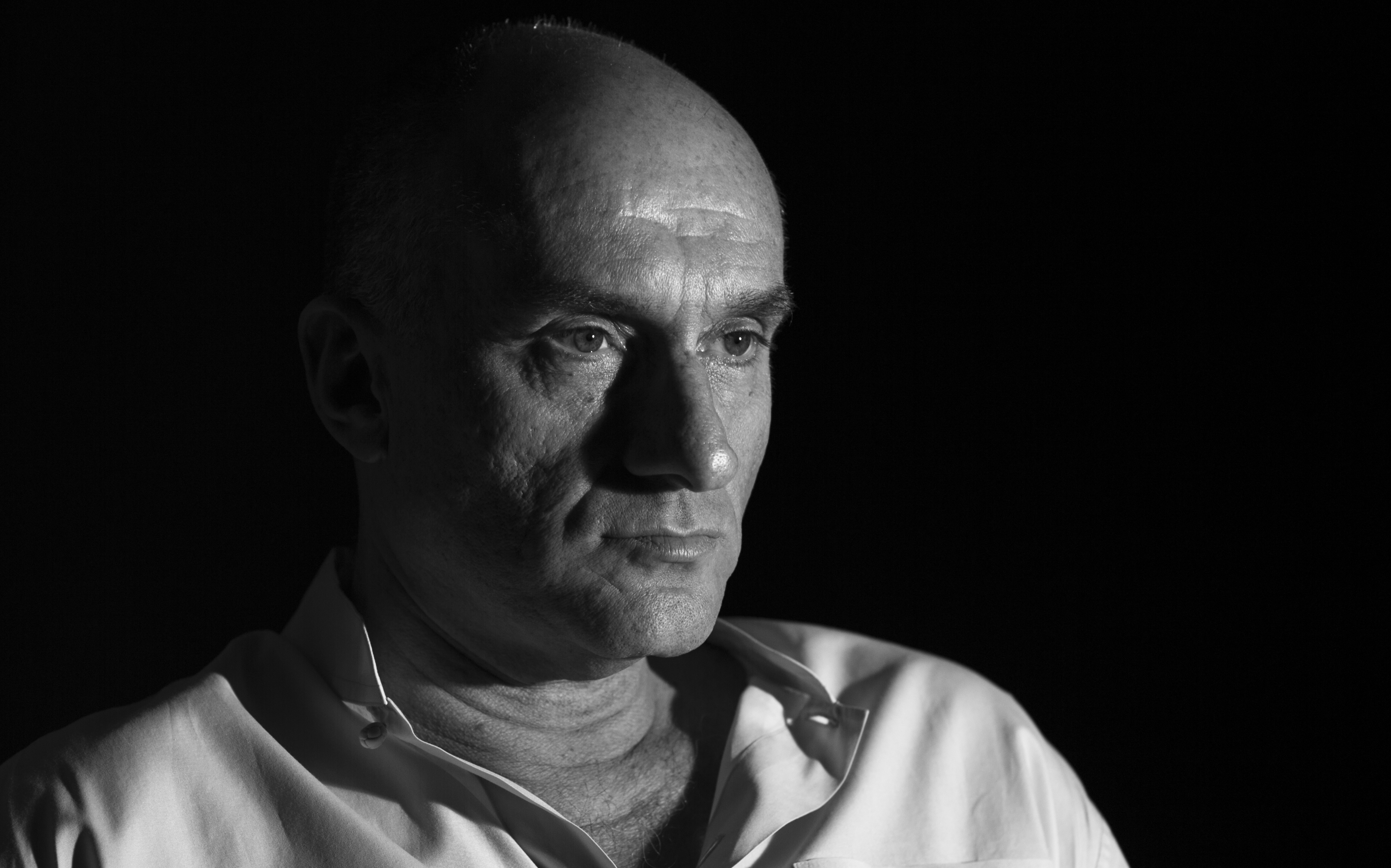
Adam Kidron record producer & media entrepreneur

Adam Kidron is a British-born ex-music producer, serial entrepreneur, and the ex-chief executive officer of Urban Box Office (UBO), a reggaeton and urban Latino record label, and Yonder Music.

== Record producer ==
Adam Kidron began working in the record industry in 1978. He worked in record production for the label Rough Trade Records, as well as Stiff Records, where he worked with artists including Davey Payne and The Blockheads. He produced the debut albums of both Scritti Politti and Orange Juice (band). In 1984, Adam Kidron and his then-girlfriend, Lizzy Mercier Descloux recorded the album Gazelles, with a band made up of leading Sowetan musicians.

In 1984, while recording Nina Hagen in Ekstasy (1985) Kidron had a near-fatal motorbike accident. He went on to produce Mercier Descloux's One for the Soul — a collaboration with jazz trumpeter Chet Baker, in Rio de Janeiro, Brazil in 1985. In 1994 Kidron was the music supervisor of the movie and executive producer of the soundtrack for "Jason's Lyric" with George Jackson, Doug McHenry and Sam Sapp. In 1995 Kidron co-executive produced the soundtrack for Mario Van Peebles, Panther In 1996 Kidron, along with Sam Sapp, Kenneth Edmonds ["Babyface"] and Antonio Reid ["LA"] executive produced The Rhythm of The Games, the official soundtrack of the Atlanta Olympic Games.

== TV producer/Catwalk (1986–1997) ==
In the mid-1980s, Kidron became partner in Crossbow Films Ltd., a UK-based independent producer of syndicated television. At Crossbow, Kidron developed television formats with Henry Winkler and Ben Elton, George Jackson and Doug McHenry, Clarence Avant and Quincy Jones. In 1990 Kidron left Crossbow to form his own production company, Marvellous Pictures, Inc.

In 1991, Kidron and partners Steve Waterman and Jeff Franklin, begun production of Catwalk in Toronto, Canada. Catwalk was a syndicated television series based around the struggles of an urban band trying to hit the big time. The series is best known for launching the career of Neve Campbell (Daisy), discovered by Kidron while she was a performer in the Canadian production of The Phantom of the Opera. Catwalk also featured Lisa Butler (Sierra), Christopher Lee Clements (Atlas), Paul Popowich (Jesse), Kelli Taylor (Mary), and Keram Malicki-Sánchez (Johnny). The show was based on a six-minute mini-movie Kidron had produced in London's docklands, which had featured Kate Moss.

== Business ventures ==
=== Urban Box Office Network ===
The urban Internet portal UBO was co-founded by Kidron, along with the late film director/producer George Jackson and lawyer Frank Cooper, in 1999. The company aggregated websites such as Latinflava.com, Soul Purpose, Support Online, Hiphop.com, Urban Music Matrix, UBO Sports and Womanhood. Latinflava, previously a Spanglish e-magazine, became UBO's own in-house label. In less than two years, Kidron, Jackson and Cooper raised over $40 million of venture capital for Urban Box Office Networks, Inc. Kidron became the CEO of the company. It went bankrupt in December 2000 with analysts and former staffers describing it as collapsing "under a morass of bad management, bad luck and an unrealistic business plan".

=== Urban Box Office ===
Urban Box Office was set up as a different company to take over the music component of Urban Box Office Network. It released its first album in 2004, and in 2005 it had several Latin music releases, including Bachata musician Andy Andy, and some reggaeton compilation albums, three reaching the top five of Billboard music’s charts. UBO's strategy was to sell low-priced CDs at five to ten dollars each through non-traditional stores, such as bodegas and hair salons. Urban Box Office went bankrupt in 2006.

In 2006, Kidron produced "Nuestro Himno"—the controversial Spanish-language version of "The Star-Spangled Banner". Kidron presented the song at a concert at the former immigration processing centre Ellis Island in May 2006.

=== Beyond Oblivion ===
Kidron was CEO of the music startup Beyond Oblivion, which intended to bundle music for mobile phone devices. Kidron came under scrutiny for his business tactics when Beyond Oblivion went bankrupt before launch, costing $33 million. It had spent heavily on marketing and filed for bankruptcy in December 2011. Kidron stated that he had faced difficulties in persuading mobile phone and computer manufacturers to collect revenue from purchasers and in "co-ordinating the diversity of the ecosystem". BOINC was the company’s successor firm, which released a service in Venezuela.

=== 4Food ===
Kidron set up 4Food, a restaurant where food could be ordered using iPads attached to the tables, in New York in 2010. The initial investment made into 4Food was for three restaurant locations, only one of which was launched. Hamburgers could be special ordered by customers then saved and named for later ordering, or posted to social media so that other customers can order the combination. Discounts were given to the creator of the hamburger for every time that combination was ordered by additional customers by name.

=== Yonder Music ===
Yonder Music was set up in May 2014 by Kidron, who is the company’s first CEO. The company was developed as a mobile-only digital music service, by providing specially-licensed mobile devices with unlimited downloading privileges. Cliff Burnstein provided seed money. Kidron stepped down in June 2017. Yonder Music shut down on March 23, 2018.

== Personal life ==
Kidron's father was Marxist economist Michael Kidron, best known for his book Western Capitalism Since the War. Adam Kidron is the brother of film director Beeban Kidron. Adam was previously married to Karen Alexander, with whom he has two daughters.
