= Michel Esteban =

- Birth name: Michel Antoine Gaston Esteban
- Born: 7 May 1951 (age 73)
- Origin: Paris, France
- Occupation(s): Record company executive, record producer, cultural center director, magazine editor
- Years active: 1973-
- Website: http://www.zerecords.com/2010/

Michel Antoine Gaston Esteban (born 7 May 1951) is a French record producer, record company executive, cultural center director and former magazine editor, who founded the Paris shop Harry Cover in 1973, was influential in the early development of punk rock, and, together with Michael Zilkha, established the New York–based record label ZE Records in 1978.

== Life and career ==
Esteban was born in Paris. From 1968, he studied graphic arts at L'École d'Arts Graphiques in the city, and in 1973 founded a shop in the Rue des Halles, Harry Cover, which specialised in rock merchandise, magazines and books as well as imported records from the US and UK. The basement was used as a rehearsal space by bands, particularly as the punk rock scene developed in the mid 1970s. In 1974 Esteban travelled around the US, returning to New York where he studied under Milton Glaser at the School of Visual Arts. He became a friend of Patti Smith, Robert Mapplethorpe, Richard Hell and Tom Verlaine of Television, and John Cale, and was a regular visitor to the CBGB music club.

Returning to Paris in 1975, he founded the magazine Rock News, which began chronicling the emergence of the punk music scene in the US, UK and France, coming into contact with Lester Bangs, Richard and Lisa Robinson, and Danny Fields in the US, and Malcolm McLaren and Vivienne Westwood in England. Together with then-girlfriend Lizzy Mercier Descloux, he attended many of the early punk performances in England, and published Mercier Descloux's first book of poems, Desiderata, as well as Patti Smith's Witt and The Night. He helped promote the first punk rock concerts in France, with the Sex Pistols in September 1976, and promoted the French band Stinky Toys in England.

In 1977, Esteban shared his time between Paris and New York, forming Rebel Records and recording French band Marie & les Garçons. In New York, he worked with John Cale, who introduced him to British-born entrepreneur and writer Michael Zilkha. They set up Cale's record label, SPY, before Esteban and Zilkha left to set up another label, ZE Records. At the time, Esteban was in a relationship with fashion editor Anna Wintour. Over the next four years, ZE became one of the most influential and fashionable record labels in the world, recording such artists as Kid Creole & the Coconuts, Was (Not Was), Bill Laswell, Lydia Lunch, and Suicide, and bringing together aspects of punk rock, the art of the Lower East Side such as Jean-Michel Basquiat and Keith Haring, and the disco scene.

Esteban left New York after differences with Zilkha in 1982. In 1983 he produced the album Paolino Parc by French new wave band Octobre. He also continued to work closely with Lizzy Mercier Descloux, visiting, recording and undertaking promotional work in Asia, Africa, and South America. He produced her successful single "Mais où sont passées les gazelles?", and the albums Lizzy Mercier Descloux (1984) and One For The Soul (1986). In 1986, he began working with the Portuguese-born Belgian singer Lio, producing her albums Pop Model (1986) and Cancan (1988); their daughter was born in 1987 but they separated in 1989.

During the 1990s, Esteban retreated from the music business and studied esoteric disciplines including Theosophy and Sufism. Later in the decade he recorded musicians in Cuba. In 2003 he re-established ZE Records, based in Paris, which has reissued many of the label's original recordings as well as new material, including Glasgow band Michael Dracula. He now lives in Salvador da Bahia, Brazil, where he has a cultural arts center project including galleries and recording studios.
