= ZE Records =

Record label

- Founded: 1978
- Founder: Michel Esteban; Michael Zilkha
- Genre: Mutant disco, dance-rock, no wave
- Country of origin: United States
- Official website: zerecords.com

ZE Records was a New York–based record label, started in 1978 by Michael Zilkha and Michel Esteban, and closed in 1984.

It was reestablished by Esteban in 2003; its website was last updated in 2019.

== History ==
Michael Zilkha (born 1954) is a British-born Oxford graduate of Iraqi descent, the son of Selim Zilkha, former owner of Mothercare, a major UK retail company, and the stepson of Cabinet member Lord Lever. In the mid-1970s, Zilkha worked in the New York publishing industry and was a contributor to the Village Voice.

Michel Esteban (b. 1951) studied art in Paris and at the School of Visual Arts in New York, before returning to Paris in 1975 and opening the shop Harry Cover (a pun on "haricots verts"), which specialised in current rock music merchandise from the US and UK. The basement shop quickly became the rehearsal place for Parisian new wave bands. Between 1975 and 1976, Esteban published Rock News, which covered the birth of the punk rock movement in London, New York and Paris. In 1977 he published Patti Smith's books Witt and The Night, and Lizzy Mercier Descloux's first book Desiderata.

In 1977, Esteban signed French new wave band Marie et les Garçons, and asked John Cale—whom he had met through Patti Smith—to produce them. Cale produced the single "Re Bop" in New York, and when he decided to start a record label with Jane Friedman he asked Esteban to help. Cale later introduced Esteban to Zilkha, and they first established SPY Records to release singles produced by Cale, including records by Harry Toledo, the Necessaries, Lester Bangs, Model Citizens, and Bob Neuwirth.

=== ZE Records ===
Zilkha and Esteban then left to set up their own label, ZE Records, a name taken from the initials of their surnames, to record the new music emerging in New York and elsewhere from a fusion of punk, disco and new wave music. Much of the music produced by the company later became categorised as either "Mutant Disco" – a title used for one of ZE's early compilation albums – or "No Wave". Chris Blackwell – a friend of Esteban's then-girlfriend, fashion editor Anna Wintour – gave ZE worldwide exposure through the label's licensing deal with Island Records.

Within a short time, ZE Records became one of the more hip labels of its time, signing up such new talent as James White and the Blacks, Was (Not Was), Kid Creole and the Coconuts, Lydia Lunch, Lizzy Mercier Descloux, Cristina, The Waitresses, Bill Laswell's Material and Richard Strange, together with more established performers including John Cale and Suicide. Many of its releases were first played at the Paradise Garage club in New York, starting point of Garage music.

ZE developed an independent and surrealist aesthetic identity. It was described by John Peel in Melody Maker in 1980 as "the best independent record label in the world", and by Paul Tickell in The Face in 1982 as "the world's most fashionable label". According to writer Andy Kellman:

"At their most inspired, the artists on ZE found some middle ground between immensely accessible disco-pop and the avant-garde, without ever falling down the middle of the road. Music that appealed to Highlights-reading six year olds as well as their Village Voice-reading parents wasn't particularly common back then (surely there are no modern-day parallels); and it's just one of the voids that the ZE label filled, fostered by a very direct collision between the novelty of pop and the possibilities of artful experimentation."

The label's success and influence peaked around 1981-82. Esteban left New York in 1982, and ZE Records closed down in 1984.

Esteban continued to work with Lizzy Mercier Descloux, and with Lio, as well as other artists. He restarted the ZE label in 2003 in France to record new artists, including Glasgow band Michael Dracula, as well as to reissue old material. As of 2015, he lived in Salvador da Bahia, Brazil.

== List of ZE recording artists ==
Alan Vega	James Chance	Optimo/Twitch
Arto Lindsay	James White & the Blacks	Pill Factory
Aural Exciters	John Cale	Richard Strange
Breakfast Club	Junie Morrison	Ron Rogers
Bill Laswell	Kid Creole & the Coconuts	Rosa Yemen
Caroline Loeb	Lio	Snuky Tate
Casino Music	Lisi	Suicide
Coati Mundi	Lizzy Mercier Descloux	Suicide Romeo
Cristina	Los Portos	Sweet Pea Atkinson
Daisy Chain	Lydia Lunch	Sympho State (Bob Blank)
Davitt Sigerson	Marie & les Garçons	Teenage Jesus and the Jerks
Don Armando's 2nd Av. Rhumba Band	Mars	The Waitresses
Garçons	Material & Nona Hendryx	Was (Not Was)
Gichy Dan's Beachwood #9	Michael Dracula	Miss OD/Ophélie Doll
Helena Noguerra	Octobre	

== Discography ==
1978
Singles

Artists	Formats	Titles
The Reasons	(7")	Hard Day At The Office / Baby Bright Eyes
Cristina	(12")	Disco Clone (Produced by John Cale)
Cristina	(12")	Disco Clone (Produced by Cristina/Zilkha/Blank)
Marie et Les Garçons	(12")	ReBop / Attitudes
Rosa Yemen	(12")	Rosa Yemen
Arto / Neto	(12")	Pini, Pini / Malu
James Chance	(12")	That's When Your Heartaches Begin
James White & The Blacks	(12")	Contort Yourself / - (Tropical) Heatwave
Sympho-State (Bob Blank)	(12")	Fever
Mars	(12")	3 E / 11,000 Volts
(Pre) Teenage Jesus And The Jerks	(12")	Less of Me 7/ My Eyes / The Closet
The Contortions	(12")	Designed to Kill / Throw Me Away
Don Armando's Second Avenue Rhumba Band	(12")	I'm An Indian, Too / Deputy Of Love

1979
Singles

Artists	Formats	Titles
Lizzy Mercier Descloux	(7")	Fire / Mission Impossible
Mars	(7")	3 E / 11,000 Volts
Cristina	(7")	Disco Clone / Disco O
Casino Music	(7")	Faites Le Proton / Amour Sauvage
Nazis Against Fascism	(7")	Sid Did It
Snuky Tate	(7")	He's The Groove
Don Armando's Second Avenue Rhumba Band	(7")	Deputy Of Love / I'm An Indian, Too
Marie et Les Garçons	(7")	ReBop / Attitudes
Garçons	(7")	ReBop Electronique
Aural Exciters	(7")	Spooks In Space
Suicide	(7")	Dream Baby Dream / Radiation
Garçons	(7")	French Boy / French Boy Reprise
Aural Exciters	(12")	Spooks In Space / Marathon Runner
Aural Exciters	(12")	My Boy Lollipop / Paradise
Last Men	(12")	Jimmy Igo / The Word
Garçons	(12")	French Boy / French Boy Reprise
Lizzy Mercier Descloux	(12")	Fire / Mission Impossible

Albums

Artists	Formats	Titles
Lizzy Mercier Descloux	(LP)	Press Color
James White & The Blacks	(LP)	Off White
Casino Music	(LP)	Amour Sauvage
Casino Music	(LP)	Jungle Love
The Contortions	(LP)	Buy
Aural Exciters	(LP)	Spooks In Space
Garçons	(LP)	Divorce
Gichy Dan's	(LP)	Beachwood # 9
Don Armando's Second Avenue Rhumba Band	(LP)	Deputy Of Love

1980
Singles

Artists	Formats	Titles
Coati Mundi	(7")	Que Passa / Me No Pop I
Kid Creole & The Coconuts	(7")	There But For The Grace Of God Go I
Suicide Romeo	(7")	Suicide Roméo / Moderne Romance
Cristina	(7")	Baby You Can Drive My Car
Kid Creole & The Coconuts	(7")	Maladie D'amour
Alan Vega	(7")	Juke Box Baby / Lonely
Kid Creole & The Coconuts	(7")	Darrio / Lili Marlene
Cristina	(7")	La Poupée Qui Fait Non / Drive My Car
Cristina	(12")	La Poupée Qui Fait Non / Blame It On Disco
Alan Vega / Richard Strange	(12")	Juke Box Baby / International Language
Coati Mundi	(12")	Que Passa / Me No Pop I

Albums

Artists	Formats	Titles
Kid Creole & The Coconuts	(LP)	Off The Coast Of Me
Suicide Alan Vega / Martin Rev	(LP)	Second Album
Suicide Romeo	(LP)	Pictures
Lydia Lunch	(LP)	Queen Of Siam
Davitt Sigerson	(LP)	Davitt Sigerson
Marie et Les Garçons	(LP)	Marie et Les Garçons
Richard Strange	(LP)	The Live Rise Of
Alan Vega	(LP)	Alan Vega

1981
Singles

Artists	Formats	Titles
Kid Creole & The Coconuts	(7")	Latin Music / Musica Americana
Was (Not Was)	(7")	Out Come The Freaks
The Waitresses	(7")	I Know What Boys Like / No Guilt
Kid Creole & The Coconuts	(7")	There But For The Grace Of God Go I ('Live')
Material + Nona Hendryx	(7")	Bustin' Out / Over & Over
Kid Creole & The Coconuts	(7")	I Am / Schweinerei
Various Artists : Télépop	(7")	Marie & Les Garcons : Amicalement Votre / Les Globetrotters - Casino Music : Max La Menace; Lizzy Mercier Descloux : Mission Impossible - Suicide Romeo : Interlude / La Séquence Du Spectateur
Cristina	(7")	Is That All There Is? / Jungle Love
Cristina	(7")	Baby You Can Drive My Car / Don't Be Greedy
Cristina	(7")	Baby You Can Drive My Car / The Ballad of Immoral Manufacture
Cristina	(7")	Things Fall Apart / Disco Clone
The Waitresses / Charlelie Couture	(7")	Christmas Wrapping / Christmas Fever
Gichy Dan	(12")	Cowboys & Gangsters / Action Man
Alan Vega & Martin Rev's Suicide	(12")	Dream Baby Dream / Radiation
Kid Creole & The Coconuts	(12")	Don't Take My Coconuts
Material + Nona Hendryx / Cristina	(12")	It's A Holiday / Things Fall Apart
Kid Creole & The Coconuts	(12")	Going Places
Was (Not Was)	(12")	Out Come The Freaks
Coati Mundi	(12")	Me No Pop I / Que Pasa
Kid Creole & The Coconuts	(12")	Latin Music
Cristina	(12")	Is That All There Is? / Jungle Love
Cristina	(12")	Baby You Can Drive My Car / The Ballad of Immoral Manufacture
Various Artists	(Box 3x12")	Mutant Disco : A Subtle Discolation Of The Norm
Was (Not Was)	(12")	Tell Me That I'm Dreaming
Material + Nona Hendryx	(12")	Bustin' Out / Over & Over
Cristina	(12")	Things Fall Apart / What a Girl To Do

Albums

Artists	Formats	Titles
Was (Not Was)	(LP)	Was (Not Was)
Kid Creole & The Coconuts	(LP)	Fresh Fruit In Foreign Places
Various Artists	(LP)	A Christmas Record 1981
Cristina	(LP)	Cristina
Various Artists	(LP)	Mutant Disco : A Subtle Discolation Of The Norm
Lizzy Mercier Descloux	(LP)	Mambo Nassau
Alan Vega	(LP)	Collision Drive

1982
Singles

Artists	Formats	Titles
Kid Creole & The Coconuts	(7")	Stool Pigeon / I'm A Wonderful Thing, Baby
John Cale	(7")	I Keep A Close Watch
Kid Creole & The Coconuts	(7")	Annie (No Soy Tu Padre)
Kid Creole & The Coconuts	(2x7")	Stool Pigeon / In The Jungle /There But for the Grace of God Go I (Live) / He's Not Such a Bad Guy After All (Live)
Kid Creole & The Coconuts	(7")	Christmas In B'Dilli Bay
Was (Not Was)	(7")	Tell Me That I'm Dreaming
Kid Creole & The Coconuts	(7")	Annie, I'm Not Your Daddy
The Waitresses	(7")	I Know What Boys Like / No Guilt
Kid Creole & The Coconuts	(12")	I'm A Wonderful Thing, Baby
Was (Not Was)	(12")	Tell Me That I'm Dreaming / Out Come The Freaks (Dub)
Kid Creole & The Coconuts	(12")	Stool Pigeon
Sweet Pea Atkinson	(12")	Don't Walk Away / Dance Or Die
Sweet Pea Atkinson	(12")	Dance Or Die / Should I Wait
Kid Creole & The Coconuts	(12")	I'm A Wonderful Thing, Baby
Alan Vega	(12")	Outlaw / Magdalena 84

Albums

Artists	Formats	Titles
Sweet Pea Atkinson	(LP)	Don't Walk Away
Kid Creole & The Coconuts	(LP)	Tropical Gangsters / Wise Guy (US Version)
John Cale	(LP)	Music For A New Society
Various Artists	(LP)	A Christmas Record 1982
The Waitresses	(LP)	I Could Rule The World If I Could Get The Parts

1983
Singles

Artists	Formats	Titles
John Cale	(7")	Hungry For Love
Kid Creole & The Coconuts	(7")	There's Something Wrong In Paradise
Kid Creole & The Coconuts	(7")	Don't Take My Coconuts
The Waitresses	(12")	Christmas Wrapping / Hangover 1/1/83
Kid Creole & The Coconuts	(12")	The Lifeboat Party
Was (Not Was)	(12")	Professor Night / Shake Your Head / Bow Wow Wow Wow

Albums

Artists	Formats	Titles
Ron Rogers	(LP)	Don't Play With My Emotions
James White's	(LP)	Flaming Demonics
Was (Not Was)	(LP)	Born To Laugh At Tornadoes
The Waitresses	(LP)	Wasn't Tomorrow Wonderful?
Caroline Loeb	(LP)	Piranana
Alan Vega	(LP)	Saturn Strip

1984
Singles

Artists	Formats	Titles
Junie Morrison	(7")	Tease Me
John Cale	(7")	Ooh La La
Daisy Chain	(12")	No Time To Stop Believing In Love / Time Version
Breakfast Club	(12")	Rico Mambo
Junie Morrison	(12")	Tease Me
Was (Not Was)	(12")	(Return To The Valley Of) Out Come The Freaks (Remixed Version)
Cristina	(12")	Ticket To The Tropics / What a Girl To Do

Albums

Artists	Formats	Titles
Davitt Sigerson	(LP)	Falling In Love Again
John Cale	(LP)	Caribbean Sunset
Was (Not Was)	(LP)	(The Woodwork) Squeaks
Kid Creole & The Coconuts	(LP)	Cre Olé The Best Of
John Cale	(LP)	Comes Alive
Junie Morrison	(LP)	Evacuate Your Seats

1989
Albums

Artists	Formats	Titles
Various Artists	(LP CD)	Zetrospective : Dancing In The Face of Adversity
Various Artists	(LP CD)	Zetrospective : Hope Springs Eternal

2003
Singles Vinyl

Artists	Formats	Titles
James White & The Blacks	(12")	01 Contort Yourself / August Darnel Remix - 02 Contort Yourself / James White & The Blacks Version; 03 Contort Yourself / Contortions Version - 04 (Tropical) Heatwave
Aural Exciters	(12")	01 Emile (Night Rate) - 02 Spooks in Space (Disco mix); 03 Maladie d'Amour - 04 Marathon Runner
Lizzy Mercier Descloux	(12")	01 Fire - 02 Mission Impossible; 03 Mission Impossible 2.0 - 04 Funky Stuff
Zevolution Serie #1 Contort Yourself By Twitch Optimo Mix	(12")	01 Contort Yourself (Optimo Mix) - 02 Stella....? 03 Know Wave / Drone Wave

Albums

Artists	Formats	Titles
Lizzy Mercier Descloux	(LP)	Press Color

Réf.	Artists	Formats	Titles
ZEREC.CD01	Various Artists	(CD)	N.Y. No Wave
ZECD02	Various Artists	(2xCD)	Mutant Disco: A Subtle Discolation Of The Norm
ZEREC.CD03	Lizzy Mercier Descloux	(CD)	Press Color
ZEREC.CD04	Lizzy Mercier Descloux	(CD)	Mambo Nassau

2004
Digipack CD

Réf.	Artists	Formats	Titles
ZEREC.CD05	Was (Not Was)	(CD)	Out Come The Freaks
ZEREC.CD06	Was (Not Was)	(CD)	(The Woodwork) Squeaks
ZEREC.CD07	James White & The Blacks	(CD)	Off White
ZEREC.CD08	James Chance & The Contortions	(CD)	Buy
ZEREC.CD09	James White's	(CD)	Flaming Demonics
ZEREC CD10	James Chance & The Contortions	(CD)	Live Aux Bains Douches Paris 1980
ZEREC.CD11	Cristina	(CD)	Doll In The Box
ZEREC.CD12	Cristina	(CD)	Sleep It Off
ZEREC.CD13	Various Artists	(CD)	Undercover
ZEREC.CD14	Various Artists	(CD)	Mutant Disco Vol.3 : Garage Sale
ZEREC.CD15	Various Artists	(CD)	A Christmas Album

2005
Digipack CD

Réf.	Artists	Formats	Titles
ZEREC.CD02A	Various Artists	(CD)	Mutant Disco Vol.1 A Subtle Discolation Of The Norm
ZEREC.CD02B	Various Artists	(CD)	Mutant Disco Vol.2 A Subtle Discolation Of The Norm
ZEREC.CD16	Lio	(CD)	Premier Album
ZEREC.CD17	Lio	(CD)	Suite Sixtine
ZEREC.CD18	Lio	(CD)	Amour Toujours
ZEREC.CD19	Lio	(CD)	Pop Model
ZEREC.CD20	Lio	(CD)	Can Can
ZEREC.CD21	Lio	(CD)	Des Fleurs Pour Un Cameleon
ZEREC.CD22	Lio	(CD)	Wandata
ZEREC.CD23	Lio	(CD)	Best Of Les Pop Songs
ZEREC.CD24	Lio	(CD)	Best Of Les Ballades
ZEREC.BOX01	Lio	7 CDs + 1 DVD	Pop Box

2006
Digipack CD

Réf.	Artists	Formats	Titles
ZEREC.CD25	Lizzy Mercier Descloux	(CD)	Best Off
ZEREC.CD30	Various Artists	(CD)	B. Loves Ze / Agnes B Compilation
ZEREC.CD32	Michael Dracula	(CD)	In The Red

2010
Albums

Réf.	Artists	Formats	Titles
ZEREC.CD31	Various Artists	(CD)	Mutant Disco Vol.4

ZETROSPECTIVE JAPAN RELEASES

Artistes	Formats	Titres
Lizzy Mercier Descloux	(MLPR / CD)	Press Color
James White & The Blacks	(MLPR / CD)	Off White
Casino Music	(MLPR / CD)	Jungle Love
Lizzy Mercier Descloux	(MLPR / CD)	Mambo Nassau
Was (Not Was)	(MLPR / CD)	Out Come The Freaks
Was (Not Was)	(MLPR / CD)	(The Woodwork) Squeaks
Contortions	(MLPR / CD)	Buy
Aural Exciters	(MLPR / CD)	Spooks In Space
Was (Not Was)	(MLPR / CD)	Born To Laugh At Tornadoes (LP)
The Waitresses	(MLPR / CD)	Wasn't Tomorrow Wonderful? (LP)
Lizzy Mercier Descloux	(MLPR / CD)	Zulu Rock
Lizzy Mercier Descloux	(MLPR / CD)	One For The Soul
Lizzy Mercier Descloux	(MLPR / CD)	Suspense
Lizzy Mercier Descloux	(MLPR / CD)	Best Off
James White's	(MLPR / CD)	Flaming Demonics
James Chance & The Contortions	(MLPR / CD)	Live Aux Bains Douches, Paris 1980
Don Armando's Second Avenue Rhumba Band	(MLPR / CD)	Deputy Of Love
Richard Strange	(MLPR / CD)	The Live Rise Of
Cristina	(MLPR / CD)	Doll In The Box
Cristina	(MLPR / CD)	Sleep It Off
Various Artists	13 Mini Lp Replica	THE COLLECTOR BOX

MLPR / CD = CD Mini LP Replica, CD replica from the original Vinyl (with covers)

Discographie Digitale

Réf.	Artists	Titles	Pistes	Bitrate
CD01	Various Artists	N.Y. No Wave	24 Tracks	(File 320 kbit)
CD02A	Various Artists	Mutant Disco Vol.1	12 Tracks	(File 320 kbit)
CD02B	Various Artists	Mutant Disco Vol.2	18 Tracks	(File 320 kbit)
CD03	Lizzy Mercier Descloux	Press Color	13 Tracks	(File 320 kbit)
CD04	Lizzy Mercier Descloux	Mambo Nassau	18 Tracks	(File 320 kbit)
CD05	Was (Not Was)	Out Come The Freaks	16 Tracks	(File 320 kbit)
CD06	Was (Not Was)	(The Woodwork) Squeaks	10 Tracks	(File 320 kbit)
CD07	James White & The Blacks	Off White	14 Tracks	(File 320 kbit)
CD08	James Chance & The Contortions	Buy	12 Tracks	(File 320 kbit)
CD09	James White's	Flaming Demonics	9 Tracks	(File 320 kbit)
CD10	James Chance & The Contortions	Live Aux Bains Douches Paris 1980	8 Tracks	(File 320 kbit)
CD11	Cristina	Doll In The Box	12 Tracks	(File 320 kbit)
CD12	Cristina	Sleep It Off	16 Tracks	(File 320 kbit)
CD13	Various Artists	Undercover	14 Tracks	(File 320 kbit)
CD14	Various Artists	Mutant Disco Vol.3 : Garage Sale	15 Tracks	(File 320 kbit)
CD15	Various Artists	A Christmas Record	14 Tracks	(File 320 kbit)
CD16	Lio	Premier Album	16 Tracks	(File 320 kbit)
CD17	Lio	Suite Sixtine	15 Tracks	(File 320 kbit)
CD18	Lio	Amour Toujours	15 Tracks	(File 320 kbit)
CD19	Lio	Pop Model	18 Tracks	(File 320 kbit)
CD20	Lio	Can Can	17 Tracks	(File 320 kbit)
CD21	Lio	Des Fleurs Pour Un Cameleon	13 Tracks	(File 320 kbit)
CD22	Lio	Wandata	15 Tracks	(File 320 kbit)
CD23	Lio	Best Of Les Pop Songs	8 Tracks	(File 320 kbit)
CD24	Lio	Best Of Les Ballades	20 Tracks	(File 320 kbit)
CD25	Lizzy Mercier Descloux	Best Off	21 Tracks	(File 320 kbit)
CD26	Lizzy Mercier Descloux	Zulu Rock	18 Tracks	(File 320 kbit)
CD27	Lizzy Mercier Descloux	One For The Soul	15 Tracks	(File 320 kbit)
CD28	Lizzy Mercier Descloux	Suspense	16 Tracks	(File 320 kbit)
CD30	Various Artists	B. Loves Ze / Agnes B Compilation	12 Tracks	(File 320 kbit)
CD31	Various Artists	Mutant Disco Vol.4	14 Tracks	(File 320 kbit)
CD32	Michael Dracula	In The Red	13 Tracks	(File 320 kbit)
CD33	Lio	Pop ModelRemix	14 Tracks	(File 320 kbit)
CD34	Aural Exciters	Spooks In Space	16 Tracks	(File 320 kbit)
CD35	Don Armando's Second Avenue Rhumba Band	Deputy Of Love	11 Tracks	(File 320 kbit)
CD36	Was (Not Was)	Born To Laugh at Tornados	15 Tracks	(File 320 kbit)
CD37	Junie Morrison	Evacuate your Seats	16 Tracks	(File 320 kbit)
CD38	Sweet Pee Atkinson	Don't Walk Away	10 Tracks	(File 320 kbit)
CD39	Various Artists	Zetrospective: Dancing In The Face of Adversity	10 Tracks	(File 320 kbit)
CD40	Various Artists	Zetrospective: Hope Springs Eternal	14 Tracks	(File 320 kbit)
CD41	Davitt Sigerson	Debut Album	10 Tracks	(File 320 kbit)
CD42	John Cale	Music For a New Society	11 Tracks	(File 320 kbit)
CD43	Marie et Les Garçons	1977 / 1979	21 Tracks	(File 320 kbit)
CD44	Suicide Romeo	Images	10 Tracks	(File 320 kbit)
CD45	Casino Music	Jungle Love	22 Tracks	(File 320 kbit)
CD46	Garçons	Divorce	12 Tracks	(File 320 kbit)
CD47	Various Artists	French & Chic	12 Tracks	(File 320 kbit)
CD48	Octobre	Next Year In Asia / Paolino Parc	14 Tracks	(File 320 kbit)
CD49	Caroline Loeb	Piranana	11 Tracks	(File 320 kbit)
CD50	Richard Strange	The Rise & Fall of	8 Tracks	(File 320 kbit)
CD51	Davitt Sigerson	Falling In Love again	9 Tracks	(File 320 kbit)
CD52	The Waitresses	Wasn't Tomorrow Wonderful?	11 Tracks	(File 320 kbit)
CD53	Ron Rogers	Don't Play With My Emotion	8 Tracks	(File 320 kbit)
CD54	Gichy Dan's Beachwood # 9	Redux Album	13 Tracks	(File 320 kbit)
CD55	Various Artists	Records Story 1979 /2009	14 Tracks	(File 320 kbit)
CD56	Various Artists	Zevolution ZE Edits	14 Tracks	(File 320 kbit)

== See also ==
- List of record labels
