= Lexicon Devil =

EP by the Germs
- Released: May 1978
- Recorded: 1978
- Genres: Punk rock, hardcore punk
- Length: 5:48
- Language: English
- Label: Slash
- Producer: Geza X

Germs chronology
Forming (1977)	Lexicon Devil (1978)	(GI) (1979)

Lexicon Devil is a three-song EP and the second release by American punk rock band the Germs. It was also the debut output of Slash Records, and of Geza X, both as a producer and as a recording engineer. The record was named after its leadoff song.

== Overview ==
In the Germs, Jan Paul Beahm served as singer and one of the principal songwriters. During the time of the Germs, Jan Paul actually went by other names he made up for himself. At the time of the band's debut single, he called himself Bobby Pyn. Bobby Pyn's persona on the single was the rather innocent "Sex Boy". On "Lexicon Devil," he reinvented his on-record persona as the much darker Darby Crash, who sings his fascistic mission statement in the self-mythologizing "Circle One", the guitar frenzy which opens the side B:

I'm Darby Crash
A social blast
Chaotic master

—The Germs, first verse of "Circle One"

The EP's title track is an apocalyptic manifesto full of fractured images, whose lyrics were written by Crash in the first person in the name of Adolf Hitler, who proclaims himself a "lexicon devil" in the song, (Note: "... The Lexicon Devil part doesn't make sense unless you know about Hitler and his speeches..." – Darby Crash) (Note: "... [Hitler's genius] lies in his speech. What he could do with words..." – Darby Crash) which is featured here in its slower and tamer first version. (Note: "... In the beginning we were playing so slow because that's all we were capable of. We speeded up when we could. It was funner to play fast." – Pat Smear) "Lexicon Devil" might also fit Jan Paul's new punk persona, since Crash was an aspiring cult leader obsessed with the idea of the mind control through the rhetoric, that is, using the power of words. (Note: "Borrowing wildly from Nietzsche and Oswald Spengler, David Bowie and Freddie Mercury, Mussolini and Dianetics, Crash came up with a narcotic kind of lyric that he believed might be a form of mind-control laced with despair and self-parody..." – Tim Adams, staff writer at The Observer) (Note: "Darby told me there were 24 different definitions for the word the, that he liked to know exactly what the meant. That's what he'd go through in his writing – the lexicon thing." – Chris Desjardins, LA Weekly interview, December 1980) Crash was one of the wordiest lyricists in the early Los Angeles punk scene, hence, while it is more musically developed than "Forming", the band's previous record, (Note: What? #WHAT 01) (Note: "The Germs music changed just because we eventually got better. We couldn't help it. We started out with nothing so we had no choice but to change..." – Pat Smear) the Lexicon Devil EP is rather remarkable for its lyrics.

"You didn't know the words because [they were unintelligible], when Darby'd sing them live, so [I] was just astounded when [the Germs] got that first Slash record and actually [I] read the lyrics. They were great!"
– John Doe, member of L.A. punk band X

"I loved to read his lyrics. You couldn't always make them out when he sang them ... Darby was one of the only performers I know of who literally used the English language as a weapon."
– Chris Desjardins, frontman of L.A. punk band the Flesh Eaters

The record closes with "No God", a Nietzschean rant which borrows the intro from "Roundabout" by Yes. (Note: "And then Yes' Fragile came out, featuring Steve Howe, who I think is the best guitarist ever. That opening riff of "Roundabout" was the first thing I learned to play..." – Pat Smear)

== Background ==
The Germs were gaining notoriety since the release of their first single, "Forming", and their early live performances. The band's increasing success also presented some roadblocks. They did not have a permanent drummer at the time. After Donna Rhia left, the band had a succession of aspiring drummers and part-timers taken on loan from other bands, including X's Don Bonebrake, who filled in at a few gigs, and the Weirdos' Nicky Beat, who took the seat in the sessions for the Lexicon Devil EP. Also, Pat Smear did not own an amplifier for his Rickenbacker electric guitar.

The band's second record came about when the publishers of the punk zine Slash agreed with the Germs to release an EP on their newly formed record label, Slash Records.

== Production ==
Lexicon Devil was recorded in Los Angeles, California at an unidentified studio, underneath a bank building, on Hollywood Boulevard.

Smear's non-ownership of an amplifier at the time actually led to the unique guitar sound on the record. Geza X was supposed to lend him one for the recording sessions, but had forgotten; instead he strung together some effect pedals and the guitarist plugged directly into the studio's mixing board.

A few days before recording commenced, aspiring drummer Don Bolles came down to Los Angeles from Phoenix, Arizona to audition for the group. He got the job, but it was too late for him to learn the songs in time to go into the studio. Instead, Nicky Beat kept the drum seat warm for the session while Bolles still participated, helping chant "Non deus, non deus, non deus" and clapping his hands, along with the Deadbeats' saxophonist Pat Delaney and the rest of the band, during the bridge in "No God".

According to Bob Biggs, Slash Records founder, the EP cost the label only $600 to produce.

== Release and artwork ==
Back cover of the Lexicon Devil EP, whose artwork illustrates Crash's sympathetic stance towards fascism.

Lexicon Devil was released as a 7-inch vinyl record in May 1978, (Note: Slash #SCAM 101) with about 1,000 copies pressed, most of them available through mail order from the punk zine Slash.

In order to promote their EP at the time of its release, the band proposed an advertisement displaying Nazi iconography accompanied with the darkly humorous slogan "Six million Jews can't be wrong", (Note: "People get bothered by racial slurs and stuff. I happen to know lots of them. I say them because they're funny. I guess it's funny because they bother people." – Darby Crash) but Slash deemed it potentially controversial and refused to print it.

Conceptually linked to the lyrical content of the record, which is a reflection of the messianic and apocalyptic obsessions of Crash, the cover art for Lexicon Devil is notorious for its contentious imagery. The front cover features The Standard Bearer, a Nazi propaganda painting by Hubert Lanzinger from ca. 1935 portraying a glorified Adolf Hitler; while the back cover, in ideological contrast, reproduces an anti-fascist political cartoon by Arthur Szyk from 1942 which portrays Hermann Göring, the Grim Reaper, Benito Mussolini, and Hirohito, who are humorously featured as alter egos of Crash, Lorna Doom, (the) Drummer (Nicky Beat at the time), and Pat Smear, respectively. The EP's artwork was printed in black ink on red, deep pink, golden and yellow paper record sleeves.

== Reissues and re-recordings ==
A rare alternate mix of "No God", with an extra drum beat at the end, was featured on the 1979 Dangerhouse Records compilation EP Yes L.A. (Note: Dangerhouse #EW-79) (Note: "... We [Dangerhouse Records] were kind of feuding with him [Geza X] about some of his production techniques, which at the time was squirrelly because he's such a creative guy and he'd try anything. So we had taken the tapes of the Germs that Slash magazine owned and remixed them the way we would do it – sort of the Geza way. It was interesting to compare..." – David Brown, co-founder of Dangerhouse Records)

Long out of print in its original form, the Lexicon Devil EP would reappear in 1981 as part of the Germs' posthumous 12-inch vinyl disc EP What We Do Is Secret, as well as included on the band's 1993 compilation album (MIA): The Complete Anthology.

In October 1978, a faster second version of "Lexicon Devil", this time with Bolles on drums, who gave the song a harder and more manic drive, was recorded for the Germs' first and only studio album, (GI), released in 1979.

A limited edition of the original EP, authorized by Warner Music Group (longtime owners of Slash Records' catalog) was released for Record Store Day 2017 by Australian label Blank Recording Co., reproducing the various different color sleeves and also presenting a colored vinyl edition.

== Cover versions ==
Southern California punk band D.I. covered "Lexicon Devil" (Note: The faster second version of the song, from the band's 1979 studio album, (GI).) for their 1994 album State of Shock.

Also in 1994, the German record label Bitzcore released Strange Notes!: A Germs Cover Compilation, featuring versions of "Lexicon Devil" and "No God", delivered by the Freeze and Final Conflict, respectively.

The 1996 tribute album to the Germs, A Small Circle of Friends, featured cover versions of "Lexicon Devil", "Circle One", and "No God", rendered by the Melvins, the Holez (Hole featuring Pat Smear), and D Generation, respectively.

In 2025, North Carolina based hardcore punk band Circle Five covered "Lexicon Devil" for their EP (NC). The record further paid tribute to the artwork of the (GI) album.

== Appearances in videogames ==
In 2013, "Lexicon Devil" was included in the video game Grand Theft Auto V, for its reproduction through the in-game radio station Channel X. Similarly, the sped-up version of the song was featured on the soundtrack for the 2004 video game Tony Hawk's Underground 2 and recently introduced in the 2025 video game Skate

== Track listing ==
Side A
No.	Title	Lyrics/Music	Length
1.	"Lexicon Devil"	Darby Crash/Pat Smear	2:06

Side B
No.	Title	Lyrics/Music	Length
1.	"Circle One"	Crash	1:48
2.	"No God"	Crash/Smear	1:54
Total length:			5:48

== Personnel ==
Germs

- Darby Crash – vocals
- Pat Smear – guitar
- Lorna Doom – bass
- Nicky Beat – drums

Additional performers

- Don Bolles – backing vocals and hand clapping (track B2)
- Pat Delaney – backing vocals and hand clapping (B2)

Production

- Steve Samiof – executive in charge of production
- Geza X – production, engineering
- Hubert Lanzinger – illustration (front cover painting)
- Arthur Szyk – illustration (back cover cartoon)

== See also ==
- An Ideal for Living, 1978 Joy Division's EP featuring Nazi-like iconography on its front cover

== Works cited ==
- Mullen, Brendan (2002). Lexicon Devil: The Fast Times and Short Life of Darby Crash and the Germs. Port Townsend, Washington: Feral House. ISBN 9780922915705.
