= What We Do Is Secret (film) =

2007 American biographical film

- Directed by: Rodger Grossman
- Screenplay by: Rodger Grossman
- Story by: Michelle Baer Ghaffari
- Produced by: Stephen Nemeth; Matthew Perniciaro; Todd Traina; Kevin Mann
- Starring: Shane West; Bijou Phillips; Rick Gonzalez; Noah Segan
- Distributed by: Peace Arch Entertainment
- Release dates: June 23, 2007 (Los Angeles Film Festival); August 8, 2008 (United States)
- Running time: 92 minutes
- Country: United States
- Language: English
- Box office: $58,776

What We Do Is Secret is a 2007 American biographical film about Darby Crash, singer of the late-1970s Los Angeles punk rock band the Germs. It was directed by Rodger Grossman, who wrote the screenplay based on a story he had written with Michelle Baer Ghaffari, a friend of Crash's and co-producer of the film. Shane West stars as Crash, while Rick Gonzalez, Bijou Phillips, and Noah Segan respectively portray Germs members Pat Smear, Lorna Doom, and Don Bolles. The film follows the formation and career of the Germs, focusing on Crash's mysterious "five-year plan", his homosexual relationship with Rob Henley (played by Ashton Holmes), and his experimentation with heroin, culminating in his December 1980 suicide. It is titled after the first track on the Germs' 1979 album (GI).

The film was in development for almost nine years due to changes in production staff and adjustments in casting. Grossman conducted numerous interviews as research, and cast West, who he felt "did a masterful job capturing Crash on film." What We Do Is Secret was independently produced and financed, and premiered at the Los Angeles Film Festival on June 23, 2007. It was distributed theatrically and on video by Peace Arch Entertainment beginning in August 2008. It was not financially successful and received mixed reviews, though West received praise for his performance and ability to emulate Crash's behavior and mannerisms. Production of the film led Smear, Doom, and Bolles to reunite as the Germs with West on vocals; this lineup performed sporadically for several years and appears on the film's soundtrack.

== Plot ==
Jan Paul Beahm grows up in Los Angeles through a troubled childhood: He does not know his biological father, his mother is an alcoholic, and his older brother dies from a heroin overdose. An avid reader, he develops into a "frighteningly intelligent" student at University High School, where his antisocial behavior leads the administration to give him straight A's if he agrees not to return. In December 1975, at age 17, he proposes to his friend Georg Ruthenberg that they start a band, showing him potential lyrics and claiming to have a "five-year plan" inspired by the David Bowie song "Five Years". They con money for instruments, and a lineup coalesces with Jan Paul on vocals, Georg on guitar, Terri Ryan on bass guitar, and Becky Barton on drums. Jan Paul comes up with the band name Germs, representing the germination of an idea.

The Germs play their first gig in April 1977: As they are heckling the Damned outside the Whisky a Go Go, Claude "Kickboy Face" Bessy of Slash magazine suggests that they perform at an open mic across the street. They give an impromptu performance of their song "Sex Boy", but do not know how to play their instruments and are heckled by the audience. Jan Paul responds by throwing flour at them and dipping the microphone in peanut butter; the band is thrown out but excited by the experience. Jan Paul comes up with pseudonyms for the members: Georg becomes Pat Smear, Terri becomes Lorna Doom, and Becky becomes Donna Rhia. Jan Paul renames himself Bobby Pyn, but soon changes this to Darby Crash. Becky is soon kicked out and the band goes through a series of replacements. Chris Ashford becomes their manager and presses their "Forming" single, the first punk rock single from Los Angeles.

At the Masque the Germs meet Don Bolles, who becomes their new drummer. Darby also meets Rob Henley, and the two begin a homosexual relationship. Darby comes up with the Germs' logo, a blue circle, as well as the "Germs burn", a symbolic circular cigarette burn on the wrist. The Germs build an audience at the Masque and advance to larger venues, playing a chaotic show at the Roosevelt Hotel on Halloween 1978. Rob vies with Don for Darby's approval, and he and Darby begin experimenting with heroin. The Germs appear on Rodney Bingenheimer's radio program and convince Slash to fund their album, (GI). Tensions rise as Rob convinces Darby that Don's drumming is not fast enough, and when a woman named Amber begins doting on Darby and declares herself his manager.

Darby's heroin use increases, as does violence at the Germs' shows, and they are banned from most clubs in Los Angeles. Darby is upset to learn that Don has started a side project. Penelope Spheeris features the Germs in her film The Decline of Western Civilization. The band plays at the Whisky a Go Go in December 1979 under the name GI, for "Germs Incognito", and when Don is late Darby replaces him with Rob. Rob does not know how to play, however, and the show is aborted when the crowd riots. Finding Rob having sex with a female fan, Darby effectively breaks up the Germs by taking off with Amber to London for several months.

Darby returns to Los Angeles with an Adam Ant-inspired fashion and a tall mohawk. He enlists Pat for his Darby Crash Band, then organizes a Germs "farewell show" at the Starwood in December 1980 with Pat, Lorna, and Don. The show goes well, with Darby telling the crowd "This is for the people who wanted to know what it was like when we were around. But this is the only one; you're not gonna see this again". Alone and despondent after the show, he enters into a suicide pact with friend Casey Cola: The two intentionally overdose on heroin; Casey survives, Darby does not. Pat receives the news as he is watching reports of the assassination of John Lennon. Darby's funeral is sparsely attended, with Pat reading a poem titled "Astrid" that Darby had written near the band's outset.

== Cast ==
- Shane West as Darby Crash (Jan Paul Beahm), leader and singer of the Germs. Jonathan Milliken plays the young Beahm in the film's opening scenes.
- Bijou Phillips as Germs bassist Lorna Doom
- Rick Gonzalez as Pat Smear, guitarist in the Germs and the Darby Crash Band
- Noah Segan as Don Bolles, the Germs' most consistent drummer
- Ashton Holmes as Rob Henley, Darby's homosexual partner
- Tina Majorino as Michelle Baer Ghaffari, a close friend of Darby and the band. Baer Ghaffari was briefly the Germs' drummer, and co-wrote the story for What We Do Is Secret with director Rodger Grossman.
- Lauren German as Belinda Carlisle, briefly a formative member of the Germs. In reality Carlisle was briefly instated as the Germs' drummer, using the pseudonym Dottie Danger, but never actually played with the band due to a bout of mononucleosis. She was replaced by Becky Barton and went on to front the Go-Go's and become a solo artist. German had previously worked with West in the 2002 film A Walk to Remember.
- Keir O'Donnell as Chris Ashford, the Germs' manager
- Sebastian Roché as Claude "Kickboy Face" Bessy, a music journalist for Slash magazine who becomes an avid supporter of the Germs
- Azura Skye as Casey Cola, who takes Darby in after his return from London and enters into a suicide pact with him, though she survives the attempt
- Ozzy Benn as Captain Sensible, bassist in the Damned
- Christopher Boyd as Dave Vanian, singer in the Damned
- Amy Halloran as Becky Barton/Donna Rhia, the Germs' original drummer. In reality Barton replaced the ill Belinda Carlisle, played three shows with the Germs, and played on the "Forming" single.
- Michele Hicks as film director Penelope Spheeris, who features the Germs in her documentary The Decline of Western Civilization
- J. P. Manoux as Rodney Bingenheimer, a disc jockey on KROQ-FM who features the Germs on his program "Rodney on the ROQ"
- Ray Park as Brendan Mullen, manager of the Masque

Additional minor roles are played by Kylan James as the Damned's drummer Rat Scabies, Chris Pontius as L.A. musician Black Randy, Randi Newton as Germs fan Gerber, Anna Waronker as (GI) producer Joan Jett, Giddle Partridge as 45 Grave singer Dinah Cancer, John Westernoff as brief Germs drummer Nickey Beat, and Missy Doty as Crash's manager Amber.

Two Los Angeles punk rock bands of the 2000s perform in the film as bands of the late 1970s. The Mae Shi perform as the Screamers in the Masque scene, playing a cover version of the Germs' "Sex Boy" with actor Rich Moreno in the role of singer Tomata du Plenty. The Bronx perform as Black Flag, opening for the Darby Crash Band by performing "Police Story"; members Matt Caughthran, Joby J. Ford, James Tweedy, and Jorma Vik respectively play the roles of Black Flag members Dez Cadena, Greg Ginn, Chuck Dukowski, and Robo.

== Development and production ==
Inspired by Penelope Spheeris' The Decline of Western Civilization and the punk rock scene of Los Angeles, AFI Film School graduate and LA native Rodger Grossman, set out to create an authentic story about the formative years of the Germs. Although the Germs project experienced several setbacks and false starts over a nine-year period, Grossman stayed committed to the film.

Pat Smear (the original guitar player in the band), who ultimately became a member of Nirvana, Foo Fighters and many other bands, was the music producer for the film. With the exception of Phillips, who played guitar (but not bass guitar), and West, who had experience as a singer, none of the other cast members had ever played musical instruments. Intent on making the music in his film sound authentic, Grossman asked Smear to help his actors learn to play their instruments. Smear rehearsed with the band and produced all the pre-recordings that were used in the movie, utilizing the other original members of the Germs; Bolles and Doom. The new band of actors slowly came together. Pat Smear said: "These kids will be as good as we were when we were bad… which is good enough". Smear went on to affectionately refer to the cast as the "Baby Germs". The music in the film was recorded during pre-production, used by the cast as synch tracks during production, and finally married with West's live vocals, which were recorded on-set. Pat Smear also produced the recordings of the other bands that perform in the movie—the Mae Shi performed as The Screamers, and The Bronx performed as Black Flag.

The financing of the film came from personal investments, including Shane West himself.

After a stressful false start in production, the cast and crew held a wrap party to celebrate the un-shot film. At the party the actors who portrayed the band (Baby Germs) entertained the crew by playing a few Germs tracks on stage. Then the original Germs, who were in attendance, joined the Baby Germs on stage. The Baby Germs handed their instruments over to the original Germs, who continued to jam with West on vocals. The result was an unexpected Germs reunion with Shane West as front man.

=== Casting ===
David Arquette was initially considered for the role of Darby Crash, but he moved on to other projects. Shane West, who auditioned with his own pop-punk band Jonny Was, was ultimately chosen as Darby Crash. West's strong connection to the material, along with his own experience as the lead singer of a pop-punk band, convinced Grossman to choose West over many other contenders. West had tooth veneers applied in order to make his teeth look like Crash's. During the hiatus between seasons of ER, West worked on the film and on getting more financing for it. Grossman cast Bjiou Phillips, to play Lorna Doom. Phillips stayed committed to the project for the entire time it took to bring the film into production. West and the other actors who portrayed the Germs' members trained for three months for the concert scenes with the help of the Germs' real members.

Heather Mallow, a personal friend of Grossman, was chosen and played the role of Darby's mother who was briefly discussed during one of the more documentary sequences during the start of the movie.

=== Filming ===
Filming began in 2005. The film was shot on location in Silver Lake, Los Angeles, California, primarily at Occidental Studios, where Charlie Chaplin and Mary Pickford once made movies. The film was shot guerrilla-style in a total of twenty-one days and in three production periods over a two-year period. Grossman used multiple camera positions to convey the significance of the band in relation to the audience. For example, in a scene depicting one of the band's first shows, the camera looks down on Darby, suggesting the lackluster effect that the band had on the audience. As the film progresses, Grossman changes the camera's position to make the stage higher relative to the audience, illustrating the control Darby had over his audience.

All wardrobe and makeup was supervised by Michelle Baer-Ghaffari, a friend of Darby's, to ensure authenticity.

== Release ==
=== Critical response ===
What We Do is Secret received mixed reviews. Review aggregate Rotten Tomatoes reports that 45% of critics gave the film a positive review based on 47 reviews, with an average score of 5.24 out of 10. The website's critical consensus states: "Despite its dynamic subject and reckless anti-glamor, this biopic about the legendary punk rocker Darby Crash fails to translate the excitement its subject generated." On Metacritic it has a weighted score of 54 out of 100, based on 18 critics, indicating "mixed or average reviews".

Although the film received mixed critical reviews, many critics praised Shane West's performance as Darby Crash, often noting that West bears a strong physical resemblance to Crash. David Wiegand of the San Francisco Chronicle spoke highly of West, writing that even though some of the supporting performances such as those of Bijou Phillips and Rick Gonzalez are very strong, it is Shane West "who lifts the film to a whole other level" as he brings "multiple layers of insight and nuance". Carrie Rickey of the Philadelphia Inquirer wrote that West had a "terrific performance" and noted he also "bears an uncanny resemblance to Darby Crash." Nora Lee Mandel of Film-Forward.com wrote that "West is magnetic trying to fill the gaps in the pop psychology insight into how the Germs' brief candle burned out so fast." John Hartl of the Seattle Times wrote that "While What We Do Is Secret may not be remembered for much more than West's performance, it's an impersonation worth saluting." Phil Gallo of Variety praised both West and Grossman writing they both "have a clear, unwavering perspective on Crash that should entice curiosity seekers and old punks." Pauline Pechin of Premiere thought that West played Darby Crash to a tee and kept on writing in fact, his performance was so believable that he's currently on tour with the reformed Germs as the lead singer. Ken Fink of TV Guide wrote "Shane West does a pretty impressive impersonation of the on-stage antics of Darby Crash".

Some critics also praised some of the supporting actors' performances as well as the cast performances as a whole. This was seen with Jim Emerson of the Chicago Sun-Times review with him writing "Where What We Do Is Secret succeeds is in the performances which sometimes expose a stilted, amateurish strain that's oddly in tune with the characters' D.I.Y. aesthetic." Sara Cardance of New York wrote "The amateur vibe suits the subject matter, and the young cast rises to the challenge." Eric Campos of Film Threat wrote that "These actors and many more make What We Do Is Secret an absolute blast to watch and they do an undeniably perfect job of recreating this notorious scene."

=== Home media ===
What We Do Is Secret was released on DVD on November 4, 2008.

== Music ==
=== Soundtrack album ===
What We Do Is Secret: Original Motion Picture Soundtrack

Soundtrack album by Lakeshore Records
- Released: September 30, 2008
- Genres: Punk rock, glam rock
- Label: Lakeshore
- Producer: Pat Smear

No.	Title	Writer(s)	Performer	Length
1.	"Five Years" (from The Rise and Fall of Ziggy Stardust and the Spiders from Mars, 1972)	David Bowie	David Bowie	4:43
2.	"Forming" (originally performed by the Germs)	Darby Crash, Pat Smear	Shane West, Bijou Phillips, Lukas Haas, and Michael LeBlanc	3:08
3.	"You Drive Me Nervous" (from Killer, 1971)	Michael Bruce, Alice Cooper, Bob Ezrin	Alice Cooper	2:25
4.	"Lexicon Devil" (originally performed by the Germs)	Crash, Smear	Shane West, Bijou Phillips, Lukas Haas, and Pat Smear	2:12
5.	"We Are the One" (from We Are the One, 1977)	Daniel O'Brien, James Wisley, Greg Ingraham, Penelope Houston	Avengers	2:39
6.	"Sex Boy" (originally performed by the Germs)	Crash, Smear	The Mae Shi with Paul Roessler	2:04
7.	"Survive" (from "Survive", 1979)	Alice Armendariz, Patricia Rainone	Bags	2:47
8.	"Circle One" (originally performed by the Germs)	Crash, Smear	Shane West, Bijou Phillips, Lukas Haas, and Pat Smear	1:46
9.	"Life of Crime" (from Destroy All Music, 1977)	Cliff Roman	The Weirdos	2:20
10.	"Manimal"	Crash, Smear	Germs with Shane West	2:41
11.	"Nausea" (from Los Angeles, 1980)	Exene Cervenka, John Doe	X	3:39
12.	"We Must Bleed"	Crash, Smear	Germs with Shane West	5:21
13.	"My Tunnel"	Crash, Smear	Germs with Shane West	3:08
14.	"Rock 'n' Roll Suicide" (from The Rise and Fall of Ziggy Stardust and the Spiders from Mars, 1972)	Bowie	David Bowie	2:57

In addition to "Forming", which appears on the soundtrack album, the team of Shane West, Bijou Phillips, Lukas Haas, and Michael LeBlanc also perform the Germs songs "Circle One", "Lexicon Devil", "Richie Dagger's Crime", "Shut Down (Annihilation Man)", and "Lion's Share" in the film. The Bronx also performs the Black Flag song "Police Story". Additional songs used in the film that do not appear on the soundtrack album include:

- "We Must Bleed" and "What We Do Is Secret" by the Germs, written by Darby Crash and Pat Smear
- "Queen Bitch", written and performed by David Bowie
- "Neat Neat Neat" by the Damned, written by Brian James
- "Taliban", written and performed by Paul Roessler
- "Gidget Goes to Hell" by Suburban Lawns, written by William Ranson and Richard Whitney
- "Adult Books" by X, written by John Doe and Exene Cervenka
- "Righteous Dub" by Mad Professor, written by Neil Fraser
- "Just Like You" by Vox Pop, written by Don Bolles
- "New Dawn Fades" by Joy Division, written by Ian Curtis, Peter Hook, Stephen Morris, and Bernard Sumner
- "Bloodstains" by Agent Orange, written by Mike Palm
