= What We Do Is Secret (EP) =

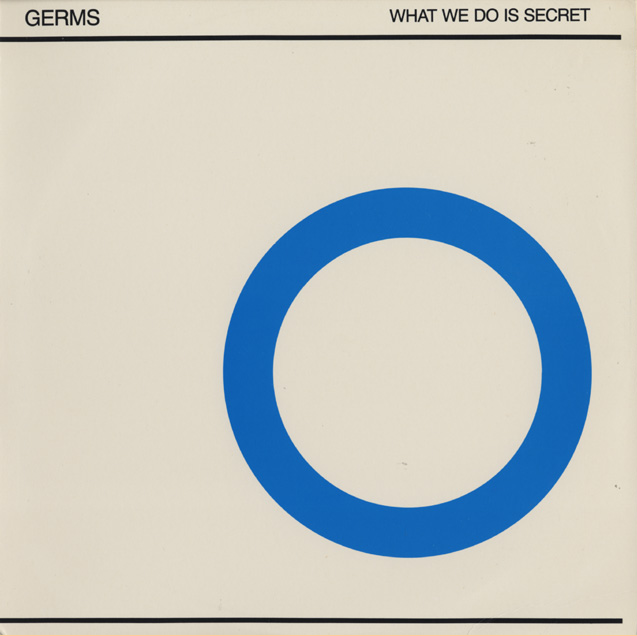

Compilation album by the Germs
- Released: 1981
- Recorded: 1977–1980
- Genre: Punk rock, hardcore punk
- Length: 18:47
- Label: Slash

Germs chronology
Germicide (1981)	What We Do Is Secret (1981)	Rock N' Rule (1986)

What We Do Is Secret is a 12" EP compiling material recorded by the Germs. It was released posthumously by Slash Records in the United States in 1981 as SREP-108. It was later also released in 1982 in Italy on the Expanded Music label as EX-20-Y. What We Do Is Secret includes the three songs from the band's second release, the Lexicon Devil EP, as well as one cover, one outtake, some crowd conversation from the band's last show, and two live tracks.

The title was taken from the first track of their 1979 (GI) LP, which was not included on this release.

A 2008 biopic of vocalist Darby Crash and the Germs was also titled What We Do Is Secret.

== Track listing ==
Side One
No.	Title	Length
1.	"Round and Round" (Originally performed by Chuck Berry. Later appeared on What Stuff compilation)	2:40
2.	"Lexicon Devil" (Originally appeared on Lexicon Devil EP)	2:03
3.	"Circle One" (Originally appeared on Lexicon Devil EP)	1:46
4.	"Caught in My Eye" (Outtake from (GI) studio sessions, later appeared on (GI) cassette)	3:21

Side Two
No.	Title	Length
5.	"No God" (Originally appeared on Lexicon Devil EP)	1:52
6.	"Dialogue From the Last Show" (Various dialogue from the Germs' last show at the Starwood on December 3, 1980)	1:31
7.	"The Other Newest One (Live)" (Live from the Starwood, December 3, 1980. Later appeared on Live at the Starwood Dec. 3, 1980)	2:46
8.	"My Tunnel (Live)" (Live from the Starwood, December 3, 1980. Later appeared on Live at the Starwood Dec. 3, 1980)	2:29
