= Ruthensmear =

RuthenSmear

Studio album by Pat Smear
- Released: 1988
- Studio: Radio Tokyo
- Genre: Pop, rock
- Label: SST (154)
- Producer: Pat Smear, Paul Roessler

Pat Smear chronology
| RuthenSmear (1988) | So You Fell in Love with a Musician... (1992) |

RuthenSmear is the first solo album by the American musician Pat Smear. The song "Golden Boys" was written by Darby Crash, but never recorded by him. Vagina Dentata, a short-lived punk band that Smear was in following the death of Crash, recorded and released a version of the song on the 1985 compilation Flipside Vinyl Fanzine Vol 2. Smear supported the album with a North American tour.

== Critical reception ==
Professional ratings
Review scores
| Source | Rating |
|---|---|
| The Great Indie Discography | 4/10 |

Trouser Press said, "Showcasing instrumental skill and scenery-chewing vocal stylings, Smear flips the idiosyncratic tracks towards Redd Kross giddiness, acoustic restraint, dance thwack, experimental nonsense and whatever else comes into his studio-bound head."

== Track listings ==
| No. | Title | Writer(s) | Length |
|---|---|---|---|
| 1. | "Sahara Hotel" | Smear, Roessler | 5:18 |
| 2. | "Golden Boys" | Crash, Bell, Smear | 3:22 |
| 3. | "Odenara" | Smear, Patino | 1:59 |
| 4. | "Blue Funk Punk" | Smear, Roessler | 3:35 |
| 5. | "Princess" | Bell | 4:33 |
| 6. | "Magicandle Tragicanary" | Smear, Roessler | 3:31 |
| 7. | "The Area of the Circle" | Harri, Farrelly | 3:30 |
| 8. | "Xmas Song" | Cardwell | 3:47 |
| 9. | "Eyes & Hearts" | Cardwell | 4:36 |
| 10. | "A Gentle Axe" | Smear, Roessler | 4:18 |

== Personnel ==
Personnel per booklet.

Musicians

- Pat Ruthensmear – lead and backing vocals, guitars; all instruments (tracks 2, 6 and 10); composition (all tracks except 8); lyrics (track 2); vocal arrangement (tracks 6 and 10); production
- Paul Roessler – keyboards (tracks 1, 3, 4, 7–9); lyrics (tracks 1, 4 and 10); backing vocals (tracks 3, 5 and 10); drums (track 4); piano (track 5); vocal arrangement (tracks 6 and 10); bass (track 8); pre-production
- Peyton Bulsara – bass (track 3)
- Linda Mack – drums (tracks 5, 7–9)
- Diggy Roots – harp (track 7)
- Nina Hagen – backing vocals (track 1)
- Julabell – backing vocals (tracks 6 and 10)
- Gary Jacobelly – backing vocals (track 10)
- Michelle Bell – lyrics (tracks 2 and 5)
- Darby Crash – lyrics (track 2)
- Deborah Patino – lyrics (track 3)
- Hari – lyrics (track 7)
- Kristin Farrelly – lyrics (track 7)
- Jena – lyrics (tracks 8 and 9)
- Sandra Christensen – composition (track 8)

Additional personnel

- Ethan James – recording
- Richard Andrews – recording
- John Golden – mastering
- Alba Ballard – photography, design
- Jane Schepis – photography (Pat photo)
