= GI (album) =

(GI)
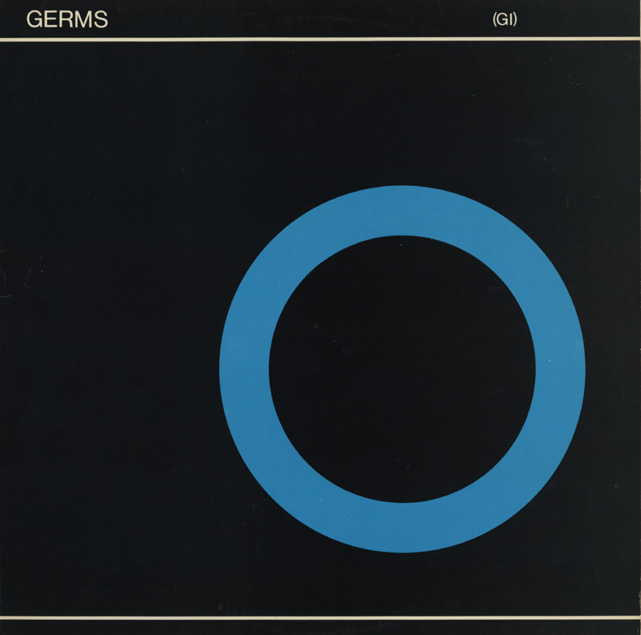

Studio album by the Germs
- Released: October 1979
- Recorded: 1979
- Studio: Quad Teck
- Genres: Punk rock; hardcore punk
- Length: 38:14; 41:39 (cassette version)
- Label: Slash (SR 103)
- Producer: Joan Jett

Germs chronology
Lexicon Devil (1978)	(GI) (1979)	What We Do Is Secret (1981)

Professional ratings
Review scores
Source	Rating
AllMusic	4.5/5 stars
Mojo	4/5 stars
Pitchfork	9.0/10
The Rolling Stone Album Guide	4/5 stars
Spin Alternative Record Guide	9/10

GI, stylized in parentheses as (GI), is the only studio album by American punk rock band the Germs. Often considered the first full-length hardcore punk album, it was released in the United States in October 1979 on Slash Records with catalog number SR 103. The album was later released in Italy in 1982 by Expanded Music with the catalog EX 11. The album's title is an acronym for "Germs Incognito", an alternate name the band used to obtain bookings when their early reputation kept them out of Los Angeles-area clubs. After (GI)'s release, the band would only undertake one more recording session, for the soundtrack album to Al Pacino's 1980 film Cruising. On December 7, 1980, a year after the release of (GI), vocalist Darby Crash died by suicide.

The entire album was included on the 1993 compilation CD (MIA): The Complete Anthology. In 2012, (GI) was reissued on CD with "Caught in My Eye" as a bonus track, after "Shut Down".

== Production ==
After the Germs recorded for Chris D.'s Tooth and Nail compilation in late 1978, the (GI) sessions took place in 1979 at Quad Teck recording studio in Los Angeles. Lead singer Crash had originally wanted former Paul Revere & the Raiders vocalist Mark Lindsay to produce, but while Lindsay was willing to do the job, he turned out to be too expensive for Slash Records to afford. Joan Jett, a longtime friend and heroine of many of the band members since her time in the Runaways, was asked to produce the album.

Recorded in about three weeks with audio engineer Pat Burnett, the album's clarity redefined the Germs for California audiences, who had only seen the band thrash around onstage while an intoxicated Crash avoided singing into the mic as much as possible.

A lone outtake from the sessions, "Caught in My Eye", would later appear on the posthumous EP What We Do Is Secret and on the Warner Bros.-distributed cassette reissue of (GI), at the end of side 1.

The album's final track, "Shut Down (Annihilation Man)", was recorded live in the studio, using improvisation at the end of the lengthy track, which the band usually closed their concerts with. The posthumous Cat's Clause release included a live "Never Ending Version" which was pressed with a locked groove.

According to Bob Biggs, Slash Records founder, the album cost the label $6,000 to produce (equivalent to $26,884 in 2026).

== Critical reception ==
NME placed G.I at number 90 on their "101 Albums to Hear Before You Die" list. In 2021, G.I was placed at number 430 on the 1001 Albums You Must Hear Before You Die book series. Rolling Stone listed it at number 28 of their "The 100 Greatest Punk Albums of All Time".

== Track listing ==
All tracks are written by Darby Crash and Pat Smear, except where noted.

Side one
No.	Title	Writer(s)	Length
1.	"What We Do Is Secret"		0:43
2.	"Communist Eyes"		2:15
3.	"Land of Treason"		2:09
4.	"Richie Dagger's Crime"		1:56
5.	"Strange Notes"	Crash	1:52
6.	"American Leather"	Crash	1:11
7.	"Lexicon Devil"	Crash	1:44
8.	"Manimal"	Crash	2:11
9.	"Our Way"		1:56
10.	"We Must Bleed"	Crash	3:05

Side two
No.	Title	Writer(s)	Length
11.	"Media Blitz"		1:29
12.	"The Other Newest One"		2:44
13.	"Let's Pretend"	Crash	2:34
14.	"Dragon Lady"		1:39
15.	"The Slave"		1:01
16.	"Shut Down (Annihilation Man)" (live)	Germs	9:40
17.	"Caught in My Eye" (Only appears on the 2012 CD release and the cassette)		3:25

On the Warner Brothers 1988 cassette reissue, "Caught in My Eye" was appended to the end of side 1, after "We Must Bleed".

== Personnel ==
=== The Germs ===
- Darby Crash – lead vocals
- Pat Smear – guitar, backing vocals
- Lorna Doom – bass guitar, backing vocals
- Don Bolles – drums, backing vocals

=== Additional performer ===
- Donnie Rose – piano on "Shut Down (Annihilation Man)" (credited only on some European editions)

=== Production ===
- Joan Jett – producer, mixing
- Pat Burnette – engineer
- Geza X – mastering
- Darby Crash – cover art
- Melanie Nissen – photography
