= Celebrity Skin (band) =

American rock band

- Origin: Los Angeles, California, U.S.
- Genres: Glam rock; punk rock
- Years active: 1985–1991
- Label: Triple X
- Past members: Tim Ferris; Gary Jacoby; Robert Haas; The "Little Matador"; Cujo; John Goodsall; Jason Shapiro; Don Bolles

Celebrity Skin was a post-punk, glam-influenced hard rock band from Los Angeles, California. They were active from the mid-1980s until the early 1990s.

== History ==
=== Early history ===
Following the death of singer Darby Crash and the subsequent breakup of the band Germs in 1980, Germs guitarist Pat Smear formed the band Vagina Dentata with Crash's former girlfriend Michelle Bell on vocals, Tim Ferris on bass, and Gary Jacoby on drums. Vagina Dentata recorded a version of the song "Golden Boys", one of the last songs co-written by Darby Crash before his death.

After the breakup of Vagina Dentata in 1985, Ferris and Jacoby recruited guitarist Robert Haas to form Celebrity Skin. Their first gig was reputedly a backyard performance for some graduating Caltech students and was characterized by multiple costume changes and drum solos to flesh out their 15-minute set. At this point, Celebrity Skin did not have a regular drummer and instead went through a number of drummers (supposedly 27) including the "Little Matador" and Cujo. Jazz fusion guitarist John Goodsall of the progressive rock bands Atomic Rooster and Brand X was also briefly a member.

Due to their raucous, prop- and costume-filled live shows, they were eventually banned from every club in Hollywood and subsequently relocated to San Francisco, at which point former Verbal Abuse guitarist Jason Shapiro joined as second lead guitarist. They experienced similar difficulties in San Francisco, where they again were banned from clubs due to their outrageous stage shows. One infamous show took place at the V.I.S. Club on Divisadero Street a week before Christmas. Photographer and artist Tony Millionaire created a mechanical sleigh pulled by four skinned goat heads. The sleigh had a bull's penis in it and the heads rocked back and forth feigning motion. The show was shut down prematurely by the owner, and the animal parts were callously thrown into the street. The next day the penis and heads were discovered off Hayes Street. Shortly thereafter the San Francisco Chronicle ran a story of "possible ritual animal sacrifice".

After Cujo left the band, former Germs drummer Don Bolles took his place. Bolles had also played with Vox Pop and 45 Grave following the breakup of the Germs. At this point, Celebrity Skin focused on the music and costumes and toned down the more sensational aspects of their stage act. In 1988, they recorded a cover of "SOS" by ABBA for the SST Records compilation The Melting Plot. Stories about the band appeared in the Los Angeles Times and in the hardcore magazine Flipside.

In 1989, the band began negotiations with the German record label LSD Records, which had recently signed the LA retro-alternative bands Thee Fourgiven and the Miracle Workers, to go to Berlin and record an album. Negotiations fell through, however, when the band discovered that the record label had only purchased them one-way plane tickets. Around the same time, they were evicted from their apartments and forced to live in "The Celebrity Suites", a suite of offices above a dance studio overlooking Hollywood Boulevard and adjacent to the offices of Rock City News. However, in April 1989 they were evicted and forced to find other accommodations.

In late 1989/early 1990, Celebrity Skin signed with LA-based record company Triple X Records, with the hope of attracting a larger label. Triple X Records, founded in 1986 by Dean Naleway and Peter Heur, had developed a reputation for signing first wave hardcore bands like D.I. and Rhino 39, and had recently achieved success by releasing Jane's Addiction's first album. Celebrity Skin joined a stable of other popular LA live acts, including Liquid Jesus, Inland Empires Funky Junkies, Pigmy Love Circus, the Ultras (formerly the Ultraviolets), on the Triple X label, and they would often perform with these bands.

In early 1990, Celebrity Skin recorded a four-song self-titled EP which was produced by former Sparks guitarist Earle Mankey, who had previously produced albums by The Runaways, The Dickies, and The Three O'Clock. The EP was recorded in Mankey's Thousand Oaks house and was released in April 1990. Throughout 1990, the band played a number of gigs at the Roxy Theatre (West Hollywood) and the Whisky a Go Go with bands including Liquid Jesus, L.A.P.D. (aka KORN), the Ultraviolets, Haunted Garage, Tender Fury, the Miracle Workers, Thelonious Monster, Steel Pole Bath Tub, and Babes In Toyland. Celebrity Skin toured the US in 1990 as the opening band for Psychic TV.

In early 1991, the band recorded their first full-length album Good Clean Fun in Hollywood, and it was released in April 1991. The album was produced by long-time punk producer Geza X who had produced albums by the Germs, the Weirdos, Black Flag and the Dead Kennedys. The album showcased the band's move into a pop direction but didn't sell well.

=== Breakup ===
In 1990, Celebrity Skin was playing in New York while touring with former 45 Grave bassist Rob Graves; Graves was discovered dead of an overdose in the back of the tour van.

Throughout 1991, Celebrity Skin continued to play local gigs in support of their album, playing at clubs including the following: Club Lingerie, Gazzarri's, and the Roxy in Los Angeles; the Kennel Club in San Francisco; and Bogart's in Long Beach. Supporting acts during this timeframe included Tad, L7, Helmet, Tiny Tim, Green Jello, the Dickies, Theater Carnivale, Ethyl Meatplow, Shonen Knife, Permanent Green Light, the Muffs, and the Ultras.

On August 24, 1991, Celebrity Skin performed at the Splattering of Tribes Festival in the desert outside Indio, California, with acts including Lead Corpse, the Rails, Liquid Jesus, Sort of Quartet, Pigmy Love Circus, Haunted Garage, the Stains, DC3, Suplex Slam, Porno Sponges, and Dead Corpse.

In October 1991, Celebrity Skin did a tour of the United States opening for the glam metal band L.A. Guns. Chuck Mosley from Faith No More traveled with them, helping out on the road.

On December 4, 1991, Celebrity Skin played a show at the Shark Club in Hollywood with Pigmy Love Circus and the Saddletramps, ten days after the death of Queen vocalist Freddie Mercury. The gig would turn out to be their final one, and the next week the band's breakup due to internal tensions were announced in the LA Weekly.

Despite their enormous popularity in the LA alternative club scene, Celebrity Skin never managed to achieve mainstream success. Their glam, '70s-influenced look, melodic hooks, and feel-good lyrics set them apart from the then-popular grunge movement, which emphasized stripped-down attire (typically jeans and flannel shirts), heavy and frequently atonal music, and angry lyrics. In addition, because of their glam look and sound, they were frequently lumped in with 80s glam metal bands such as Poison and Warrant despite having little musically in common with these acts. A description of their travails can be found on the web site Sleazegrinder:

The mullets of the fly-over states were manifestly unprepared to cope with the 'Skins. These poor saps automatically all had to buy every record they saw s'long as the doods on the cover were rank lookin' longhairs with nose rings and they all bought the e.p. only to feel infuriated, ashamed, and ripped-off by how un-macho Celebrity Skin was—and their Geza X-produced full-length on Triple X records confused the heartland's bleached denim-wearers even more. These were the days when Jane's Addiction still elicited violent reactions from the farm towns, and Celebrity Skin's waggish and whimsical art-trash was just well beyond the Def Leppard and Bon Jovi weened, sheltered, programmed, milk-fed frames of reference. The Celebrity's still unforgivable androgyny and bizarre sense of humor was even lost on many of my own stonewashed bros from way out, who just never fully appreciated that whole whacky, zany, west coast silly joke-rock vibe, a la the Dickies. A lot of people don't need their rock to be funny. Especially not rural Metal Church enthusiasts.

Following the breakup of Celebrity Skin, the various members moved on to other music-related pursuits. According to AllMusic, guitarist Jason Shapiro formed the band Threeway (still in existence as of late 2011) also currently playing with Redd Kross, and bassist Tim Ferris formed Big Baby, and later reputedly joined the Cramps. Lead singer Gary Jacoby released a second CD as a member of the Death Folk with former Germ member Pat Smear, and a solo album under the name of Gary Celebrity, Diary of a Monster, which contained the former Celebrity Skin songs "Fairies To London", "Golden Boys", "Gods", "Hobos", and "Life's a Gas". Drummer Don Bolles was a disc jockey for the Los Angeles radio station KDLD, where he had a regular and long-running show called The All-Night Truck Driver's Show and played in the occasional 45 Grave reunion show. In 2006, in answer to the favorable response to the Germs biopic What We Do Is Secret, Bolles, guitarist Pat Smear and bassist Lorna Doom reunited the LA hardcore band the Germs with the actor who played deceased singer Darby Crash, Shane West, taking over on vocals. Bolles currently plays with the group Fancy Space People.

=== Reunion ===
In August 2005, Celebrity Skin posted a page on the MySpace website and had 962 friends as of April 2010. On October 6, 2007, all five members of Celebrity Skin reunited for the second annual LA Weekly Detour Music Festival in downtown Los Angeles and were enthusiastically received by the crowd; a number of videos of this performance (as well as a few from their heyday) are available on YouTube. As of August 2008, they have posted no information regarding future shows.

== Sound and image ==
Celebrity Skin's musical style is a combination of glam rock and punk rock, consisting of pop hooks and strong melodies played with a rough, loud, feedback-laden edge. Similar to their contemporaries Redd Kross, Celebrity Skin celebrated 70s musical and fashion styles. Their most relevant musical antecedents were the so-called "glitter" bands of mid-70s pre-punk Los Angeles, including Sparks, Zolar X and the Quick, as well as the early Los Angeles glitter-influenced punk bands the Germs, the Weirdos, the Skulls, and the Dickies. Their music also had elements of such first wave glam bands as Slade, David Bowie, T. Rex, and the New York Dolls; an early review by the LA Weekly stated that Celebrity Skin was "the only band in Hollywood to take seriously the music and styles of the original wave of glam rockers like Bowie Sparks, Gary Glitter, T. Rex, etc." Another obvious musical antecedent was Redd Kross, one of the first L.A. bands to embrace the sound, themes, and images of 70s trash culture and combine them with the harder edge of punk rock.

Celebrity Skin's sound evolved over their career, with earlier songs like "Long Black Yak" and "Rat Fink" having a rougher, more punk/hardcore quality while later songs like "Evicted" showing off more of their pop side, with lusher harmonies and more melodic guitar. In recorded work, their sound was considerably more polished than their live sound, and was augmented by keyboards and sound effects. Their lyrics often focused on themes such as glamor, celebrity, stardom, etc.

Written descriptions of their music emphasized their musical range. A 1990 article in BAM described their sound as having "the quirkiness and strange time signatures of Sparks", "the multi-lead guitars of Lynyrd Skynyrd or Wishbone Ash", "the sheer punk rock energy/white noise of the Germs", and "a knack for hooks worthy of ABBA or KC and the Sunshine Band"; an article from BAM later in 1990 emphasized their "trademark Sparks-meet-Dickies-meet-Oingo Boingo sound". An LA Weekly article from 1990 mentioned "distorted sounds of 70's pop washed over with raw punk and gushes of feedback", and an article from 1991 describes their sound as "stringing Queen crunch-chords and Josie & the Pussycats harmonies and the strip-joint doorman's come-on of Alice Cooper". Finally, a review in the rock trade publication Music Connection from 1989 described Celebrity Skin's musical style as follows:

Celebrity Skin is certainly like nothing you've ever heard before or likely will hear again. At times, the band's songs transport you to a crowded beer hall in Düsseldorf, Germany, with packs of unruly Germans singing drunken anthems. Then they whisk you off to England for an eye and an earful of campy glam humor and drag-rock fashion. And then whoosh, its [sic] back to the States for a screeching thrash that coud [sic] only emanates from a decidedly American intellect.

Celebrity Skin covered a broad range of songs by other artists. Among their most popular songs was a cover of "SOS" by Swedish pop group ABBA, which they recorded twice, once on the Melting Plot compilation for SST Records and once on their eponymous Triple X EP. Their covers of "This Town Ain't Big Enough for Both of Us" by Sparks and "All the Young Dudes" by Mott the Hoople was never recorded but were also extremely popular show closers in their live shows. They also covered "Celluloid Heroes" by the Kinks, "Godstar" by Psychic TV, "Elo Kiddies" by Cheap Trick, and "To Sir With Love" by Lulu.

Celebrity Skin's live shows were renowned for their raucousness and entertainment value and mimicked the image and theatrics of 70s glam artists like Alice Cooper, Gary Glitter, Ziggy Stardust-era David Bowie, and Slade. Moreover, they frequently played shows with other groups, such as Theatre Carnivale, Green Jello, and Gwar, that had elaborate stage shows and interactive theatrics.

== Discography ==
- Celebrity Skin (1990, Triple X Records)
- Good Clean Fun (1991, Triple X Records)

== Timeline ==
1985

Formed in Los Angeles; first gig reputedly a backyard party at Caltech

1985–1987

Soon banned from clubs in LA; move to San Francisco

Move back to LA

1988

Spring/Fall 1988 Cooperage, UCLA show with Legal Weapon

December 1988 Probe club show with Ultras/Ultraviolets

12/03/88 Raji's show with Liquid Jesus and Haircuts That Kill

1989

04/25/89 Article in LA Times by Rob Winfield, mentions gig 04/25/89 at John Anson Ford Theater, Hollywood, opening for Jane's Addiction; mentions negotiations with "European record company"; mentions UCLA gig previous year

07/13/89 Whisky a go-go show with Pigmy Love Circus and Groovie Ghoulies

07/26/89 Anaheim Convention Center supporting The Damned (medieval fantasy theme)

Mid-summer 1989 Cover and article in Flipside Magazine by Sarah Hackett; mentions "recent Raji's show"

09/04/89 Review of Whisky show in Music Connection

09/04/89 Article in Music Connection Magazine by Eric Niles

10/28/89 Limbo Lounge/Speak No Evil Christmas In Hell show

11/22/89 Whisky a go-go show with the Miracle Workers

11/28/89 Westwood Plaza show, UCLA

12/31/89 Club Lingerie show with L7 and Imperial Butt Wizards

1990

Early 1990 Europe tour

USA tour opening up for Psychic TV

04/09/90 Review in LA Weekly by Johnny Angel of Palace show with Trulio Disgracias and Thelonious Monster

April 1990 Release of Celebrity Skin EP on Triple X Records, produced by Earle Mankey

04/09/90 Mention in LA Weekly of episode of thirtysomething filming at Al's Bar

04/13/90 Roxy show with Clyde, Liquid Jesus and the Weirdos

04/27/90 Helter Skelter show with the Warlock Pinchers, Ultraviolets and Fudge Factory

08/10/90 Article in BAM by Scotto Morrow

08/18/90 Whisky a go-go show with Haunted Garage and Pygmy Love Circus

09/01/90 Bogart's show in Long Beach with Tender Fury

09/07/90 Review of Whisky a go-go show in BAM by Bill Holdship; mention that it is their first appearance "in several months"; mention that it was done in costume as characters from The Wizard of Oz

October 1990 Camarillo State Hospital show

10/27/90 Roxy show with the Miracle Workers, Babes In Toyland and Steel Pole Bathtub

10/30/90 Picture and review of "pre-Halloween party" show at Roxy in the Daily Trojan newspaper by Sean Doles; mention that it is their final performance for next six months

11/02/90 Review of Roxy show in LA Weekly by Lorraine Ali

11/16/90 Review of 10/27/90 review by Johnny Angel in BAM magazine of show at Roxy with Miracle Workers & Babes In Toyland

1991

02/22/91 Article in BAM magazine announcing their record release party April 8

03/01/91 Club Lingerie show with Tad, L7, and Helmet

04/07/91 Article in Los Angeles Times Sunday Calendar Supplement by Steve Appleford.

04/10/91 Kennel Club show in San Francisco with Tiny Tim, Green Jello, Pygmy Love Circus (video of band here: https://lilmike.me/celebrity-skin-s-o-s-live-in-sf-1991/ )

04/13/91 Hollywood High show with Tiny Tim, Green Jello, the Dickies

04/22/91 Release date for Good Clean Fun LP

04/23/91 Record Release party at Hong Kong Café

05/18/91 Bogart's show in Long Beach

07/18/91 Gazarri's show with Theater Carnivale, Ethyl Meatplow

08/11/91 Roxy show with Shonen Knife, the Cowsills, Psycho Sisters, Permanent Green Light

08/17/91 Bogart's show in Long Beach, with Muffs and Ultras

08/24/91 Splattering of Tribes Festival with Lead Corpse, The Rails, Liquid Jesus, Sort of Quartet, Pigmy Love Circus, Haunted Garage, The Stains, DC3, Suplex Slam, Porno Sponges, and Dead Corpse, Indio, California

08/26/91 Club With No Name

10/08/91–10/31/91 U.S. tour opening for L.A. Guns: 10/08/91 Toad's Palace, New Haven, Connecticut 10/09/91 CITI, Boston, Massachusetts 10/10/91 Derringers 10/12/91 Hammerjack's, Baltimore, Maryland 10/13/91 Shirley Acrews, Inwood, West Virginia 10/15/91 Bayou, Washington, D.C. 10/16/91 Character's, Greenville, South Carolina 10/17/91 Illusions, North Charleston, South Carolina 10/19/91 Cadillacs, Hickory, North Carolina 10/20/91 Masquerade, Atlanta, Georgia 10/21/91 Beacham Theatre, Orlando, Florida 10/23/91 Button South, Hallandale, Florida 10/25/91 Club Lavela, Panama City, Florida 10/26/91 TBA, New Orleans, Louisiana 10/31/91 Universal Amphitheater, Universal City, California

12/04/91 Shark Club show with Pigmy Love Circus, Saddletramps

12/13/91 Breakup announced in LA Weekly
