= Celebrity Skin (disambiguation) =

Celebrity Skin is a 1998 album by the group Hole.

Celebrity Skin may also refer to:

- "Celebrity Skin" (song), the title song from the Hole album
- Celebrity Skin (magazine), a pornographic magazine
- Celebrity Skin (band), an early-1990s band from Los Angeles
- "Celebrity Skin" (Instant Star episode)
