= So You Fell in Love with a Musician... =

Studio album by Pat Smear
- Released: 1992
- Studios: Silverlake Studios, Los Angeles, California
- Genre: Alternative rock
- Length: 40:25
- Label: SST (294)
- Producer: Pat Smear

Pat Smear chronology
Ruthensmear (1988)	So You Fell in Love with a Musician... (1992)

So You Fell in Love with a Musician... is the second solo album by guitarist Pat Smear, released by SST Records in 1992. A music video, filmed by Dave Markey, was made for the song "Innocent X". The song "Creep Street", was originally recorded by Smears' previous, short-lived band Vagina Dentata, and their version of the song was released in 2012 on the compilation Chaotic Reasoning Vol. 2.

== Critical reception ==
Professional ratings
Review scores
Source	Rating
AllMusic	3/5 stars

Trouser Press wrote that "Smear’s goofy enthusiasm, cool playing and the whole thing’s casual, underproduced quality give it a crummy, ass-backwards sort of charm."

== Track listing ==
1. I'll Find You (Pat Smear) – 3:35
2. Lulu Belle (Pat Smear, Jena) – 2:05
3. Creep Street (Michelle Bell, Pat Smear, Gary Jacoby) – 4:02
4. Holy Bulsara (Pat Smear) – 3:01
5. Ever Alone with Thee (Pat Smear) – 1:54
6. All My Cheating (Pat Smear) – 4:37
7. Innocent X (Pat Smear) – 6:49
8. Cold Towne (Pat Smear) – 2:15
9. Yummy Yuck (Pat Smear) – 4:14
10. Love Your Friends (Maggie Ehrig, Pat Smear, Paul Roessler) – 4:03
11. Lazy (Pat Smear) – 3:49

== Personnel ==
- Pat Smear – Vocals, guitar, bass
- Gary Jacoby – Drums
- Stephanie Bennett – Harp on "Ever Alone with Thee"
- Walter Spencer – Bass on "Love Your Friends" & bass solo on "Innocent X"
- Michele Gregg – Chant on "Creep Street"
