= Forming (song) =

Single by Germs
- B-side: "Sex Boy"
- Released: July 1977
- Genre: Punk rock
- Length: 3:06
- Label: What Records?
- Songwriter: Bobby Pyn

Germs singles chronology
"Forming" (1977)	"Lexicon Devil" (1978)

"Forming" is the debut single by American punk rock band the Germs. Released on What?, an independent start-up label, in July 1977, it is regarded as the first true Los Angeles punk record.

== Background and recording ==
The Germs, comprising four teenagers, formed not long before the recording of the single: David Bowie-worshipping friends Jan Paul Beahm and Georg Ruthenberg met Belinda Carlisle and Teresa Ryan while staking out Queen's Freddie Mercury at a Beverly Hills motel, and decided to start a band. Vocalist Beahm changed his name to Bobby Pyn (he would soon become better known as Darby Crash), guitarist Ruthenberg became Pat Smear and bassist Ryan transformed into Lorna Doom. Carlisle dropped out when she came down with mononucleosis and never played a live show with the group. She was replaced as drummer by Becky Barton, redubbed Donna Rhia. The band's all-female rhythm section put them—along with X—in the vanguard of women's participation in early L.A. punk, as featured in such acts as Bags, The Controllers, Eyes and the all-female Go-Go's. "Forming" was the band's first composition, written by Pyn after a few rehearsals in the Ruthenberg family garage.

The band made its live debut on April 16, 1977, at a show organized by The Weirdos, a fellow punk band. In the May issue of Raw Power, a concert reviewer saw dim prospects for the new band and its 18-year-old frontman:

The Germs came on first and were the biggest joke of the year. None of the Germs could play their instruments whatsoever. They took an hour to get set up and then played for two minutes. The lead singer smeared peanut butter all over his face and everybody's in the group, and they all were spitting on each other until they were kicked off. You can bet they won't be back either.

"Forming" was recorded not long afterward on a 2-track reel-to-reel recorder in Smear's garage, with one microphone for the instruments and another for the vocals. Chris Ashford, a friend of the band, helped set up the equipment. While he was at work at Peaches, a local record shop, the band ran through multiple takes of the song—along with several others—and picked out the best to release as the single. There was an echo effect on Pyn's vocals that was accidental; Smear later said: "Somebody just bumped into this knob".

The B-side, "Sex Boy", was recorded live to cassette at the Roxy nightclub in West Hollywood during the filming of the Cheech & Chong movie Up in Smoke. According to Pyn, the tape recorder was brought into the venue surreptitiously.

== Release and reception ==
Ashford conjured up a music label, What? Records, and convinced Peaches to sell its inaugural 45—according to Smear, on the promise that it would be the "only store in the world" to offer it. (What? would issue another seminal L.A. punk single, The Dils' "I Hate the Rich", in September.) Acting as the band's manager, Ashford arranged a photo session for the single at The Masque, a central punk nightclub, in June. According to a 1977 interview with the band, 3,000 copies of "Forming" were printed, but the first 1,000 were "messed up". Ashford later explained that "the pressing plant goofed up and flipped the labels, and they threw like 800 of them over a hill at some houses". Despite the small number of copies and the drastically limited distribution, it made Billboard's New Wave Top Ten chart.

Interviewed by Slash in 1978, Pyn said that "Forming" was "about breaking down the government and forming our own." Heylin regards the song, whose chorus declares "I'm your gun/Pull my trigger", as a vehicle for Pyn to enact a punk version of Bowie's provocative Ziggy Stardust persona. Comparing it to The Damned's "New Rose"—the first single from the English punk scene—Jon Savage wrote that it articulated both its specific subcultural context and the broader punk notion that artists do not have to master their craft before seeking an audience: "As the riff churns repeatedly at the end, Pyn delivers a critique of the band's performance: 'The drums are too slow, the bass is too fast, the chords are all wrong, they're making the ending too long—Aaah I quit!'"

Claude Bessy, founder and editor of the local punk scene's leading fanzine, Slash, described the "Forming" 45 as "beyond music...mind-boggling...inexplicably brilliant in bringing monotony to new heights". Retrospectively, popular music historians Brendan Mullen and Marc Spitz characterized it as a "surly drone ... with a tempo that could be kept by a wind-up, cymbal-crashing monkey", while Clinton Heylin finds it most notable for its "ineptitude". It is a "primitive blast", according to AllMusic's Ned Raggett, "un-produced and proud of it". "Sex Boy", he wrote, the "hilarious, chaotic" B-side, features "bottles breaking while Crash practically attacks the audibly scared audience".

Drummer Don Bolles described the experience of his introduction to "Forming" soon after it came out:

I was transfixed; this was either the best or worst thing I had ever heard. The A-side was this amazingly low-tech approach to "stereo"—vocals in one channel, music (or three-chord sludge, as it were) in the other, with the singer matter-of-factly pointing out that "whoever would buy this shit is a fucking jerk". ... [The ending was] punctuated by the thunk sound of the mic hitting the floor! Now THIS, I thought to myself, is PUNK!"

In early 1978, Bolles would become the Germs' permanent drummer.

Live versions of both "Forming" and "Sex Boy" appeared on the 1981 release Germicide, which documented one of the band's early concerts. Donna Rhia departed the band soon after the recording of the single. An alternate version, produced by Ashford, to some extent, was recorded later in 1977 with drummer D. J. Bonebrake, who would become well known as a member of X. Referred to as "Forming 2", it was not officially released until 1993, when it appeared on (MIA): The Complete Anthology, also the first Germs album to include the original release versions of "Forming" and "Sex Boy".

== Personnel ==
- Bobby Pyn (Jan Paul Beahm, aka Darby Crash) – vocals
- Pat Smear (George Ruthenberg) – guitars
- Lorna Doom (Teresa Ryan, aka Terry Target) – bass
- Donna Rhia (Becky Barton) – drums

== Notes ==
- Heylin, Clinton (2007). Babylon's Burning: From Punk to Grunge (Canongate). ISBN 1-84195-879-4
- Leblanc, Lauraine (1999). Pretty in Punk: Girls' Gender Resistance in a Boys' Subculture (Rutgers University Press). ISBN 0-8135-2651-5
- Mullen, Brendan, and Marc Spitz (2001). "Sit on My Face, Stevie Nicks! The Germs, Darby Crash, and the Birth of SoCal Punk", Spin (May).
- Mullen, Brendan, with Don Bolles and Adam Parfrey (2002). Lexicon Devil: The Fast Times and Short Life of Darby Crash and the Germs (Feral House). ISBN 0-922915-70-9
- Patterson, Fred (1997). "Like Everything Else in Los Angeles, It Is Now a Mini Mall", in Make the Music Go Bang!: The Early L.A. Punk Scene, ed. Don Snowden (Macmillan). ISBN 0-312-16912-4
- Raggett, Ned (2002). "Germs (M.I.A.)—The Complete Anthology", in All Music Guide to Rock: The Definitive Guide to Rock, Pop, and Soul, 3d ed., ed. Vladimir Bogdanov, Chris Woodstra, and Stephen Thomas Erlewine (Backbeat). ISBN 0-87930-653-X
- Raha, Maria (2005). Cinderella's Big Score: Women of the Punk and Indie Underground (Seal). ISBN 1-58005-116-2
- Savage, Jon (1992). England's Dreaming: Anarchy, Sex Pistols, Punk Rock, and Beyond (St. Martin's). ISBN 0-312-08774-8
