= A Small Circle of Friends (album) =

Compilation album by Various artists
- Released: August 27, 1996
- Length: 79:21
- Label: Grass

Professional ratings
Review scores
Source	Rating
AllMusic	2.5/5 stars

A Small Circle of Friends is a Germs tribute album, released in 1996.

== Details ==
After the last track, there is a minute of silence before a sixteen-minute-long reprise of the song performed by Hovercraft begins. Just over a minute passes before a spoken word recording by Drew Blood, titled "Mohawk Redemption" is heard.

== Track listing ==
All tracks written by Darby Crash and Pat Smear except where noted.

1. NOFX – "Forming" (Darby Crash) – 0:54
2. Free Kitten – "Sex Boy" – 2:28
3. The Melvins – "Lexicon Devil" – 1:40
4. Hole (as "The Holez" w/ Pat Smear) – "Circle One" (Darby Crash) – 2:56
5. D Generation – "No God" – 2:04
6. Mike Watt & J Mascis – "What We Do is Secret" – 0:43
7. Ruined Eye – "Land of Treason" – 3:09
8. The Posies – "Richie Dagger's Crime" – 2:57
9. O-Matic – "Strange Notes" – 1:58
10. White Flag – "Manimal" – 2:07
11. that dog. – "We Must Bleed" – 1:39
12. Flea – "Media Blitz" – 1:58
13. Sator – "The Other Newest One" – 2:58
14. The Wrens – "Let's Pretend" – 2:44
15. Matthew Sweet – "Dragon Lady" – 3:03
16. Gumball – "Caught in My Eye" (Darby Crash) – 3:11
17. Meat Puppets – "Not All Right" – 4:02
18. Puzzled Panthers – "Now I Hear the Laughter" (Darby Crash/Lorna Doom) – 3:19
19. L7 – "Lion's Share" – 2:43
20. Monkeywrench – "Shutdown" – 3:04/Hovercraft – "Shutdown Reprise" – 16:00/Drew Blood – "Mohawk Redemption" – 0:39

== Personnel ==
- Produced by White Flag's Bill Bartell
- Project Coordinated by Garvey Rich
- Legal by Fred Davis
