= Paul Roessler =

American musician and record producer (born 1958)

- Born: August 27, 1958 (age 67); New Haven, Connecticut, U.S.
- Genres: Punk rock; electropunk
- Occupations: Musician; record producer
- Instrument: Keyboards
- Years active: 1978–present

Paul Roessler (born August 27, 1958) is an American musician and record producer. Roessler was a prominent member of the L.A. punk scene during the late 1970s and 1980s. He played keyboards in bands such as The Screamers, Twisted Roots, 45 Grave, Nervous Gender, SAUPG, Geza X and the Mommymen, Mike Watt and the Secondmen, Nina Hagen and The Deadbeats. Roessler has also released solo recordings such as "Abominable," "Curator," "The Arc," "6/12," "Match Girl," The Turning of the Bright World,""Burnt Church The Opera" with Jeff Parker, and a four double album set "The Drug Years." He currently works as a record producer at Kitten Robot Studios in Los Angeles, California. He is the older brother of Kira Roessler, formerly of Black Flag, and the son of underwater photographer Carl Roessler.

== Biography ==
Paul Roessler was born on August 27, 1958, in New Haven, Connecticut. In 1974, he moved to West Los Angeles where he met and befriended future Germs band members Darby Crash and Pat Smear at University High. After graduating from high school, Roessler went on to study classical music at California State University, Northridge, for a few semesters before leaving in early 1978 to join innovative electropunk band, The Screamers. After two successful years, The Screamers found themselves rapidly disintegrating as a band, causing Roessler to leave in January 1980, and would then go on to play in Nervous Gender with former Germs drummer Don Bolles as well as in Geza X and the Mommymen.

After a few months of going between bands, Roessler was recruited by Nina Hagen to join her for an upcoming European tour. After touring Europe and America with Hagen, they recorded NunSexMonkRock. Before Roessler's second tour with Hagen, Pat Smear from the Germs joined the band. Later, when Smear left the band, Roessler left also. In 1981, he formed the band Twisted Roots with Smear and younger sister Kira Roessler. During this time, he was playing with 45 Grave, Josie Cotton, DC3 (with Dez Cadena of Black Flag) and Crimony (with Mike Watt) as well. During this time Roessler was also doing sessions with many other bands such as the Dead Kennedys and Saccharine Trust. Roessler has continued to work with Nina Hagen and Josie Cotton.

From 1998 to 2011, Roessler worked as the in-house producer at Satellite Park Studio with Geza X. In 2006, Roessler released an autobiographical poetry book entitled Eight Years (Brass Tacks Press, 2006). In 2010, Roessler produced and played keyboards on Nina Hagen's gospel album Personal Jesus (Universal). He has been a member of the Fancy Space People with Don Bolles and Nora Keyes since 2009. In October 2011, they joined the Smashing Pumpkins on their "Other Side of the Kaleidyscope" tour.

In November 2011, he relocated to the newly opened Kitten Robot Studios in the Silver Lake neighbourhood of Los Angeles where he has continued to write and record his own music and produce dozens of bands.
