= Germs (band) =

American punk rock band

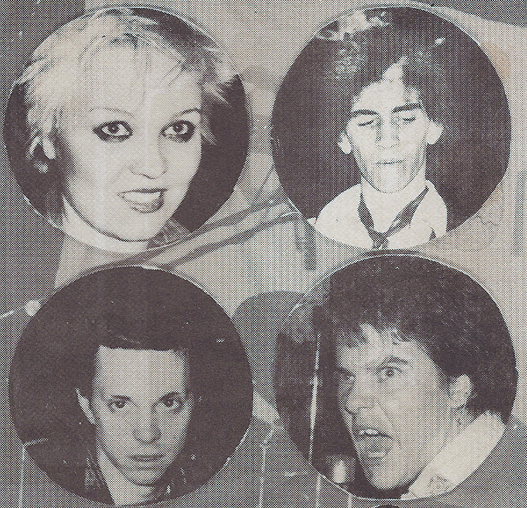
- The Germs in 1979 on a Flipside calendar. Clockwise from top left: Lorna Doom, Pat Smear, Darby Crash and Don Bolles.

Background information
- Also known as: Sophistifuck and the Revlon Spam Queens, GI
- Origin: Los Angeles, California, U.S.
- Genres: Punk rock; hardcore punk
- Years active: 1976–1980; 2005–2009; 2013
- Label: Slash
- Spinoffs: Darby Crash Band; Nervous Gender; 45 Grave; Celebrity Skin
- Past members: Darby Crash; Pat Smear; Michelle Baer; Dinky Grant; Lorna Doom; Dottie Danger; Donna Rhia; David Winogrond; Luisa Terrence; Cliff Hanger; D. J. Bonebrake; Nicky Beat; Don Bolles; Rob Henley; John Lorey; Shane West; Charlotte Caffey

The Germs were an American punk rock band from Los Angeles, California, originally active from 1976 to 1980. The band's "classic" lineup consisted of singer Darby Crash, guitarist Pat Smear, bassist Lorna Doom and drummer Don Bolles. They released only one album, 1979's (GI), produced by Joan Jett, and were featured in Penelope Spheeris's seminal documentary film The Decline of Western Civilization, which chronicled the Los Angeles punk movement. The Germs disbanded following Crash's suicide in 1980. Their music was influential to many later rock acts, and Smear went on to achieve greater fame performing with Nirvana and Foo Fighters.

In 2005, actor Shane West was cast to play Crash in the biographical film What We Do Is Secret. He performed with Smear, Doom, and Bolles at the film's wrap party, and afterwards, the Germs reunited with West as their new frontman. This lineup of the band toured worldwide, which included performances at the 2006 and 2008 Warped Tours.

== History ==
=== Formation ===
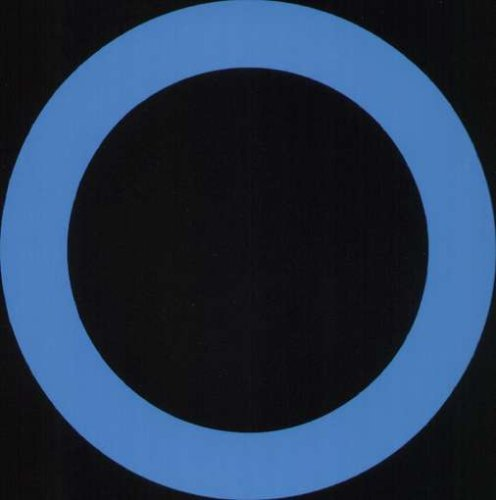
The band's logo, also used as the album cover for (GI).

Crash (born Jan Paul Beahm) and Smear (born Georg Ruthenberg) decided to start a band after being kicked out of University High School for antisocial behavior. Their efforts were inspired by groups like The Runaways and The Stooges. Before they settled on the Germs as a band name, they called themselves Sophistifuck and the Revlon Spam Queens. They reputedly began calling themselves the Germs because they did not have enough money to print T-shirts with longer band names.

In April 1976, the band added Lorna Doom (born Teresa Ryan) on bass, with transitional member Dottie Danger (later famous as Belinda Carlisle of the Go-Go's) on drums. Carlisle never actually played with the band, as she was sidelined by a bout of mononucleosis for an extended period. She was replaced by her friend Donna Rhia (Becky Barton), who played three gigs and performed on their first single. Carlisle remained a friend and helper of the band (she can be heard introducing the band on the Germicide: Live at the Whiskey recording, produced by Kim Fowley), only leaving because her new band, the Go-Go's, were becoming popular and, as she put it, "I was really disturbed by the heroin that was going on". Nickey Beat, of various noteworthy Los Angeles bands including the Weirdos, also sat in on drums for a time.

The band's first live performance was at the Orpheum Theater, a 99-seat venue on the Sunset Strip in then-unincorporated area West Hollywood, California (later the location of Book Soup). Smear recalled: "We made noise. Darby stuck the mic in a jar of peanut butter. It was a dare, we had no songs or anything! Lorna wore her pants inside out, and Darby covered himself in red licorice... we made noise for five minutes until they threw us off".

The Germs initially drew musical influences from Iggy Pop, David Bowie, Ramones, the Runaways, Sex Pistols, and New York Dolls. Early on, Smear was the only musically experienced member; Doom survived early performances by sliding a finger up and down the fretboard of her bass while Rhia generally kept a minimal beat on the bass drum, periodically bashing a cymbal.

Early performances were usually marked by raucous crowds made up of the band's friends. As a result, their gigs became notorious for being rowdy and usually verged on a riot.

=== Recordings ===
The first single, "Forming", was recorded on a Sony two-track reel-to-reel recorder in Smear's family garage, and arrived back from the pressing plant with a note warning "this record may cause ear cancer" printed on the sleeve, much to the band's displeasure. It was released in July 1977 on the What? label. The single featured a shambolic but serviceable performance on the A-side and a muddy live recording of "Sexboy" on the B-side, recorded at the Roxy for the Cheech and Chong movie, Up in Smoke. The song was not used in the movie, nor was the band. They were the only band not to receive a call-back to perform live for the film's "Battle of the Bands" sequence, perhaps due to the fact that the Germs' chaotic Roxy performance had featured an unscripted, full-on food fight.

Throughout their career, they had a reputation as a chaotic live band. Crash often arrived onstage nearly incoherent from drugs, singing everywhere but into the microphone and taunting the audience between songs, yet nevertheless, delivered intense theatrical and increasingly musical performances. The other band members prided themselves on similar problems, with many contemporary reviews citing collapses, incoherence and drunken vomiting onstage. Fans saw this as part of the show, and indeed, the band presented it as such, even when breaking bottles and rolling in the glass, with the music coming and going.

Smear was revealed to be a remarkably talented and fluid player; much later, after Crash's death, critics finally acknowledged his lyrics as poetic art. Crash's vocals had begun to mold themselves around the style of the Screamers' vocalist Tomata DuPlenty. Another strong influence on the band's final sound was Zolar X, a theatrical glam rock band popular in the Los Angeles area c. 1972–1980. Crash and Smear were enthusiastic fans of the band from the pre-Germs days, and the fast tempos and raw guitar tone of (the historically pre-punk) Zolar X were similar to the sound achieved on later Germs recordings.

The Germs recorded two singles (with alternate tracks), an album-length demo session, and one full-length LP, (GI), each more focused and powerful than the last. Crash was, despite his erratic behavior, generally regarded as a brilliant lyricist (a contemporary critic described him as "ransacking the dictionary"), and the final line-up of Smear, Doom and Bolles had become a world-class rock ensemble by the recording of (GI), turning in a performance that spurred an LA Weekly reviewer to write, "This album leaves exit wounds". It is considered one of the first hardcore punk records, and has a near-mythic status among punk rock fans. The album was produced by Joan Jett of the Runaways. Some European copies of the album also credited Donny Rose on keyboards (the song "Shut Down" was recorded live in the studio and featured melodic, two-fisted piano). The Germs were featured in Spheeris's documentary film The Decline of Western Civilization along with X, Black Flag, Fear, Circle Jerks, Alice Bag Band, and Catholic Discipline.

Following the release of their only studio album, (GI), on Slash Records, the Germs recorded six original songs with producer Jack Nitzsche for the soundtrack to the film, Cruising, starring Al Pacino. Doom wrote one of the songs. Only one of these songs, "Lions Share", ended up on the Columbia soundtrack album. It was featured for approximately one minute in the movie, during a video-booth murder scene in an S&M club. Other songs from this session did not appear until the 1988 bootleg Lion's Share, along with four tracks from their infamous last show at the Starwood. The Cruising sessions were finally released officially on the CD (MIA): The Complete Anthology.

=== Dissolution and suicide of Crash ===
The end of the band came when Crash, who had become increasingly impatient with drummer Bolles' antics, fired him and replaced him with his friend and lover Rob Henley, a fellow heroin addict.

Shortly after the Germs split, Crash and Smear formed the short-lived Darby Crash Band. Circle Jerks drummer Lucky Lehrer joined the band on the eve of their first (sold-out) live performance when, during a soundcheck, Darby kicked out the drummer they had rehearsed with. The band, described by Smear as "like the Germs, but with worse players", played only a few gigs to lukewarm reaction before splitting up.

Shortly after that, Crash contacted Smear about a Germs "reunion" show, claiming it was necessary to "put punk into perspective" for the punks on the scene. However, Smear has said Crash told him privately he wanted to earn money for heroin with which to die by suicide. Since Crash had described this scenario many times in the past, Smear did not take him seriously.

On December 3, 1980, an over-sold Starwood hosted a final live show of the reunited Germs, including Bolles. At one point, Crash told the amazed kids in the audience, "We did this show so you new people could see what it was like when we were around. You're not going to see it again". Rhino Handmade officially released this live set, previously unavailable in its entirety, as Live at the Starwood Dec. 3, 1980 on June 14, 2010. Along with the CD, the release includes an 8½" × 11" replica of the original poster for the show, a reproduction of the handwritten set list and a four-page fanzine with photos and liner notes by Jonathan Gold.

Crash died by suicide on December 7, 1980, at age 22. Unreported at the time, Crash had overdosed on heroin in a suicide pact with close friend Casey "Cola" Hopkins, who ended up surviving. She later insisted that he did not intend for her to live, nor did he change his mind at the last minute and intend for himself to live. According to Spin, apocryphal lore has Crash attempting to write "Here lies Darby Crash" on the wall as he lay dying, but not finishing. In reality, he wrote a short note to David "Bosco" Davenport that stated, "My life, my leather, my love goes to Bosco".

Outside the world of the Germs' fans, news of Crash's death was largely overshadowed by the murder of John Lennon the next day. A local news station mistakenly reported that Crash had died from taking too many sleeping pills.

=== Aftermath ===
After the Germs ended, Bolles played with several other L.A. bands, including Nervous Gender, 45 Grave, Celebrity Skin, and Ariel Pink. In fall 2009, Bolles joined the cast of punks, mods and rockers web series Oblivion.

In 1993, Slash released (MIA): The Complete Anthology, with liner notes by Pleasant Gehman.

Smear went on to play with Nirvana during their last year and, after the death of Kurt Cobain, with Mike Watt, and then Foo Fighters.

In 1996, a tribute album titled A Small Circle of Friends was released, that featured tracks by Watt, Free Kitten, Melvins, Meat Puppets, that dog., L7, the Posies, NOFX, Flea, Gumball and others, along with a version of "Circle One" performed by Smear with Hole under the name "the Holez".

=== What We Do Is Secret, reformations and Doom's death (2005–present) ===
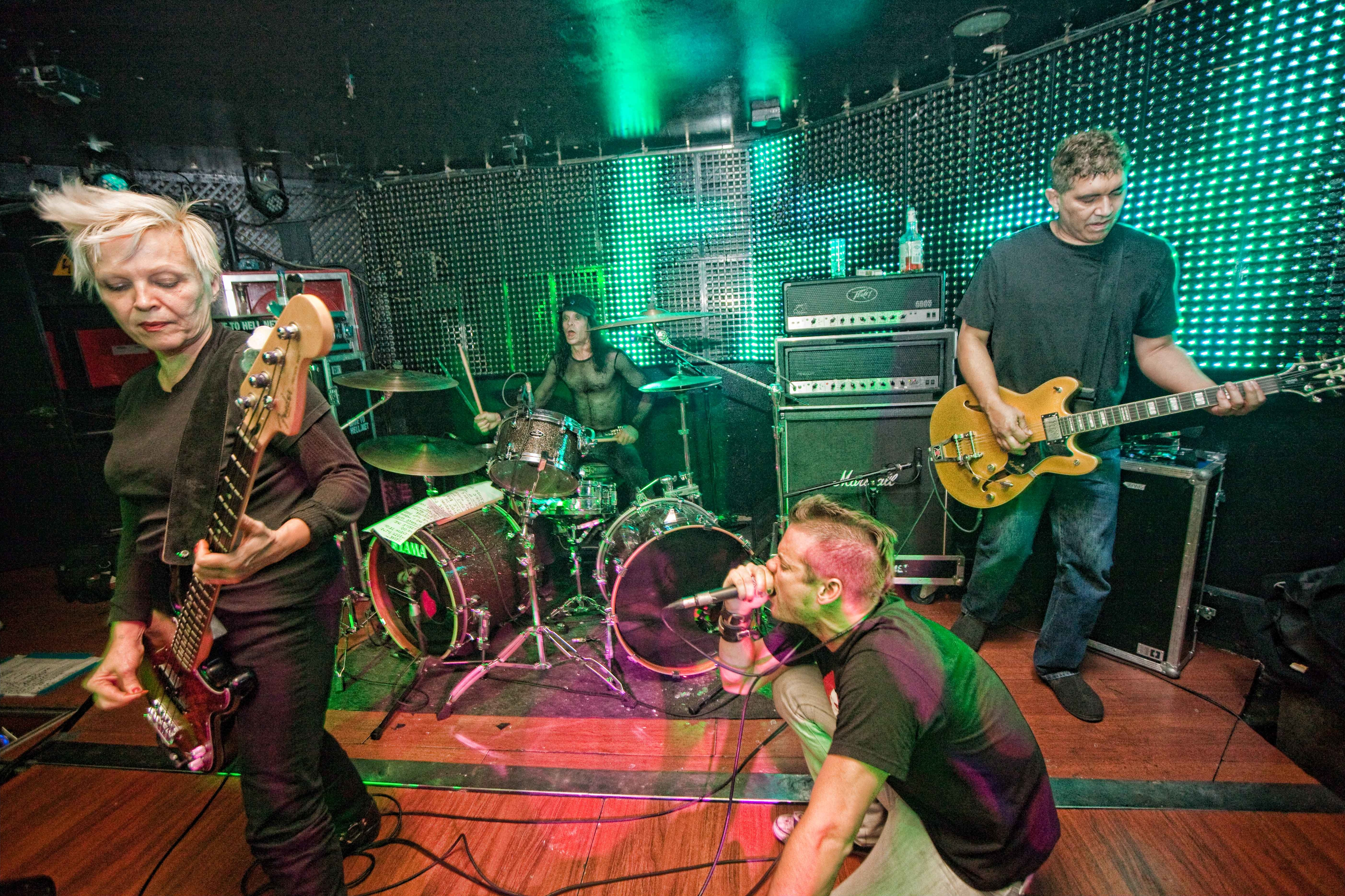
The Germs performing in 2009.

A film about the Germs, What We Do Is Secret, was in production for several years, and premiered June 23, 2007, at the Los Angeles Film Festival. The film was theatrically released on August 8, 2008, and starred Shane West in the role of Darby Crash.

Smear, Doom, and Bolles reactivated the Germs with West as singer. They played on the 2006 Warped Tour and toured clubs in the US later that summer, and again in 2007. They once again played on the 2008 edition of the Warped Tour, on the Vans Old School Stage. Some members of the punk rock community such as Fat Mike and Jello Biafra were critical of the band's decision to perform with West.

In a July 2009 article, Bolles spoke about the band's plans to re-record old material for a planned box set titled Lest We Forget: The Sounds of the Germs. The band rearranged songs from the Germicide live album and the Cruising sessions; they planned to record several Darby Crash Band songs as well. Live recordings, both old and new, would have made up the rest of the box set, which Bolles hoped to release in 2010. The newly recorded songs were to be released on Smashing Pumpkins frontman Billy Corgan's new, unnamed record label. Two songs, "Out of Time" and "Beyond Hurt – Beyond Help", were originally written by Crash and Smear prior to Crash's death, but were never recorded. The songs were to be recorded with West providing vocals. West left the Germs in 2009.

In December 2013, Charlotte Caffey of the Go-Go's played bass for a one-off gig, a memorial for Bill "Pat Fear" Bartell, when Doom could not be located.

On January 16, 2019, Doom died of breast cancer.

== Members ==
Classic lineup

- Darby Crash (a.k.a. Jan Paul Beahm) – lead vocals (1976–1980; died 1980)
- Lorna Doom (a.k.a. Teresa Ryan) – bass guitar (1976–1980, 2005–2009; died 2019)
- Pat Smear (a.k.a. Georg Ruthenberg) – guitar, vocals (1976–1980, 2005–2009, 2013)
- Don Bolles (a.k.a. Jimmy Michael Giorsetti) – drums (1978–1980, 2005–2009, 2013)

Other former members

- Michelle Baer – drums (1976)
- Dinky (a.k.a. Diana Grant) – bass guitar (1976)
- Dottie Danger (a.k.a. Belinda Carlisle) – drums (1977)
- Donna Rhia (a.k.a. Becky Barton) – drums (1977)
- David Winogrond – drums (1977)
- Luisa Terrence - drums (1977)
- Cliff Hanger – drums (1977–1978)
- D. J. Bonebrake – drums (1978)
- Nicky Beat (a.k.a. Nickey Alexander) – drums (1978)
- Rob Henley – drums (1980)
- John Lorey - drums (1980)
- Shane West – lead vocals (2005–2009, 2013)
- Charlotte Caffey – bass guitar (2013)

== Discography ==
=== Studio album ===
- (GI) (1979, Slash Records)

=== Singles and EPs ===
- "Forming"/"Sexboy (live)" 7-inch (1977, What? Records)
- Lexicon Devil 7-inch EP (1978, Slash Records)
- What We Do Is Secret 12-inch EP (1981, Slash Records)
- (DCC) 7-inch EP (1992, Rockville/Gasatanka Records)

=== Live albums ===
- Germicide (a.k.a. Live at the Whisky, First Show Ever) (1981, Mohawk/Bomp! Records/ROIR)
- Rock 'N' Rule (1986, XEX Records)
- Live at the Starwood 12/3/80 (double LP), (2019 Rhino Entertainment Company, Run Out Groove) ROGV-080

=== Compilation albums ===
- (MIA): The Complete Anthology (1993, Slash/Rhino Records)
- Media Blitz (1993, Cleopatra Records)

=== Compilation album appearances ===
- Tooth and Nail (1979, Upsetter Records)
- Yes L.A. 12-inch EP (1979, Dangerhouse Records)
- Life Is Beautiful So Why Not Eat Health Foods (1981, New Underground Records)
- We're Desperate: The L.A. Scene (1976-79) (1993, Rhino) - "Forming", "Lexicon Devil"

=== Soundtrack appearances ===
- Cruising (1980, Lorimar Records)
- The Decline of Western Civilization (1980, Slash Records)
