= Pat Smear =

American guitarist (born 1959)

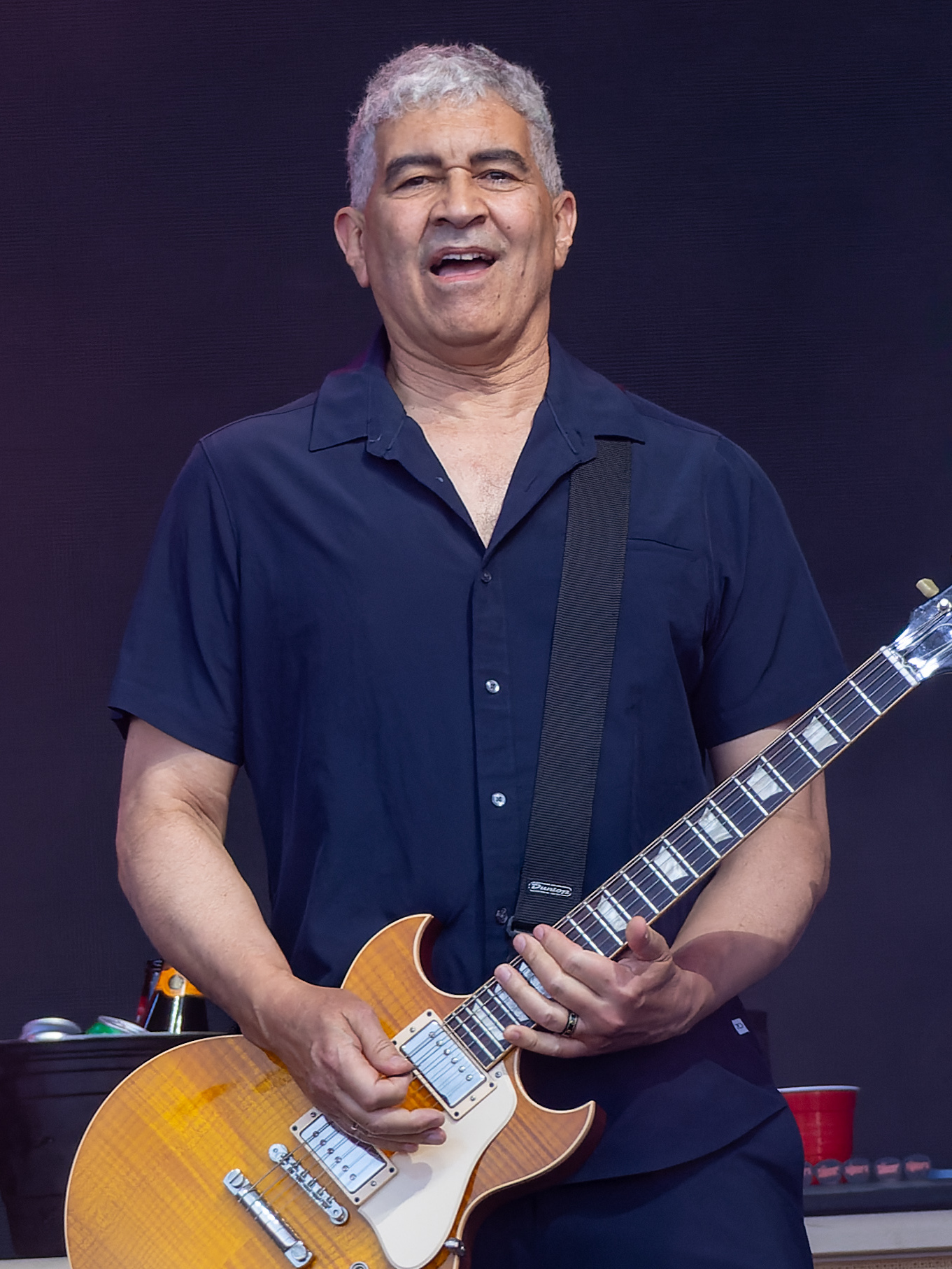
- Pat Smear performing with Foo Fighters in 2023

Background information
- Born: Georg Albert Ruthenberg; August 5, 1959 (age 67); Los Angeles, California, U.S.
- Genres: Alternative rock; punk rock; hardcore punk; death rock; grunge; post-grunge
- Occupations: Musician; songwriter
- Instruments: Guitar; vocals
- Years active: 1976–present
- Member of: Foo Fighters
- Formerly of: Germs; Nirvana; Vagina Dentata; Twisted Roots; 45 Grave; Adolescents; Sound City Players

Georg Albert Ruthenberg (born August 5, 1959), better known by his stage name Pat Smear, is an American musician who plays guitar for Foo Fighters. He was the lead guitarist and co-founder of the Los Angeles–based punk band Germs and a touring guitarist for Nirvana. Smear joined Foo Fighters in 1994 and left the band in 1997. In 2005, he rejoined Foo Fighters as a touring guitarist before becoming a full-time member again in 2010. Smear has played in several other bands and has also released his own material as a solo artist. In 2021, he was inducted into the Rock and Roll Hall of Fame as a member of Foo Fighters.

== Early life ==
Smear was born and raised in West Los Angeles, California to a German Jewish father and African American and Native American (Cherokee) mother. His parents enrolled him in piano lessons at a young age, and a few years later he began teaching himself to play the guitar.

At age 13, he left home to join a commune. Later, he attended Innovative Program School (IPS), an alternative school within University High School in Los Angeles. It was there he met vocalist Darby Crash, alongside whom he would play in the Germs in the late 1970s. Smear and Crash were both expelled from IPS due to concerns they were inciting unruly behavior among the students.

== Career ==
=== The Germs (1976–1980) ===
Smear lists his influences as Joan Jett, Brian James, Brian May, and Steve Jones. He also stated that "all the guitar playing" of John McKay on Siouxsie and the Banshees's first album "really inspired me" and that Yes guitarist Steve Howe is "the best guitarist ever". In 1976, Smear and Darby Crash formed the Germs with bassist Lorna Doom and drummer Dottie Danger (the pseudonym of Belinda Carlisle, who would go on to front The Go-Go's). Smear was the only band member who had any musical knowledge or proficiency at the time. For most of his time in the Germs, Smear reported that he didn't own a guitar but rather "just borrowed from whoever we were playing with".

Carlisle was soon replaced by Don Bolles and, in 1979, the band released their first album, (GI), produced by Joan Jett. The record is now regarded as a milestone in the history of punk rock, with Smear earning praise for his guitar work: "Smear has an equal claim to being the album's star [alongside Darby], though, and for good reason – not only did he co-write everything, his clipped, catchy monster riffing was as pure punk in the late-'70s sense as anything, wasting no time on anything extraneous."

The Germs, along with Smear, appeared in the punk documentary The Decline of Western Civilization (1981), directed by Penelope Spheeris. Darby Crash died before the film was released, leading to the band breaking up.

=== Twisted Roots / The Adolescents / 45 Grave (1981) ===
Following the demise of the Germs, Smear played in 1981 with the ex-Screamers keyboardist Paul Roessler and his sister Kira Roessler in Twisted Roots. Although short-lived, the band was the toast of the Hollywood punk scene. He also had a brief stint as a member of punk band the Adolescents in 1981.

Smear was briefly in deathrock band 45 Grave with Don Bolles (the former drummer for the Germs). During this stint, they recorded a 7" titled Black Cross and other tracks that would later appear on 45 Grave's 1987 compilation album, Autopsy.

=== Film career (1981–1986) ===
During this time, he also worked as an actor in bit parts, appearing in the television shows Quincy, M.E. and CHiPs, and in the films Blade Runner, Breakin' and Howard the Duck. While working on Breakin', Smear became friends with Courtney Love. He also appeared as an extra in the music video for Prince and the Revolution's single "Raspberry Beret," sitting in front of Lisa Coleman's piano. According to Smear, he was hand-picked by Prince himself for the video.

=== Solo career (1987–1992) ===
Smear would go on to make two solo albums of his own, Ruthensmear, released in 1987 and recorded with Paul Roessler, and So You Fell in Love with a Musician..., released in 1992.

=== Hole (1992) ===
Smear recorded and mixed a cover of "Circle One" in December 1992 with Courtney Love on vocals and bass, Smear and Eric Erlandson on guitar, and Patty Schemel on drums. A 7-inch vinyl was released under the name The Holez in 1993. The cover later appeared on the compilation album A Small Circle of Friends in 1996.

=== Nirvana (1993–1994) ===
In 1993, he received a call from Nirvana's frontman Kurt Cobain, asking him to join the band as a second guitarist for an upcoming tour. At first, Smear thought his friend, Carlos "Cake" Nunez, was pranking him; however, Courtney Love had told Smear a few days prior that Cobain was going to call him. Smear accepted immediately and played his first show with Nirvana on Saturday Night Live on September 25, 1993. He toured with Nirvana for about six months. Smear appeared on their live albums MTV Unplugged in New York, From the Muddy Banks of the Wishkah, as well as on material for the compilations Nirvana and With the Lights Out and the concert DVD Live and Loud.

=== Foo Fighters (1994–1997) ===
Following Cobain's death, Nirvana drummer Dave Grohl formed a band to support his self-titled album, which would ultimately become known as Foo Fighters. Smear joined the group from its inception in late October 1994, but because their first album was a collection of demos recorded solely by Grohl, Smear did not appear on a Foo Fighters album until The Colour and the Shape (1997).

Shortly after the release of The Colour and the Shape, Smear quit the band. As Smear later explained, he quit mainly due to exhaustion from the band's relentless touring schedule. Smear's departure was also related to inner-band tensions that sprung up around Grohl's divorce from his first wife, Jennifer Youngblood, who was a close friend of Smear. Grohl explained that he "begged" Smear to stay and Smear agreed to remain in Foo Fighters temporarily due to scheduled touring obligations, but only until a replacement guitarist could be recruited. Grohl eventually invited Franz Stahl, his former bandmate from Scream, to fill the lead guitarist slot.

Smear announced his departure from Foo Fighters during a live performance at the 1997 MTV Video Music Awards; he played partway through the set, then introduced Stahl who completed the gig.

=== Hiatus from Foo Fighters and Germs Reunion (1997–2008) ===
Smear kept a fairly low profile during his absence from Foo Fighters. He produced the debut album for the band Harlow and made scattered television appearances. He was employed as a creative consultant in a motion picture about the Germs and Darby Crash, entitled What We Do Is Secret, named after one of the band's best-known songs. The film was released at the Los Angeles Film Festival on June 23, 2007, had a limited theatrical release in 2008, and is now available on DVD. In the film, Smear is depicted by actor Rick Gonzalez. In 2005, he began performing reunion shows with the Germs, including actor Shane West, who portrays Darby Crash in the film, filling in as lead vocalist.

=== Rejoining Foo Fighters (2005–present) ===
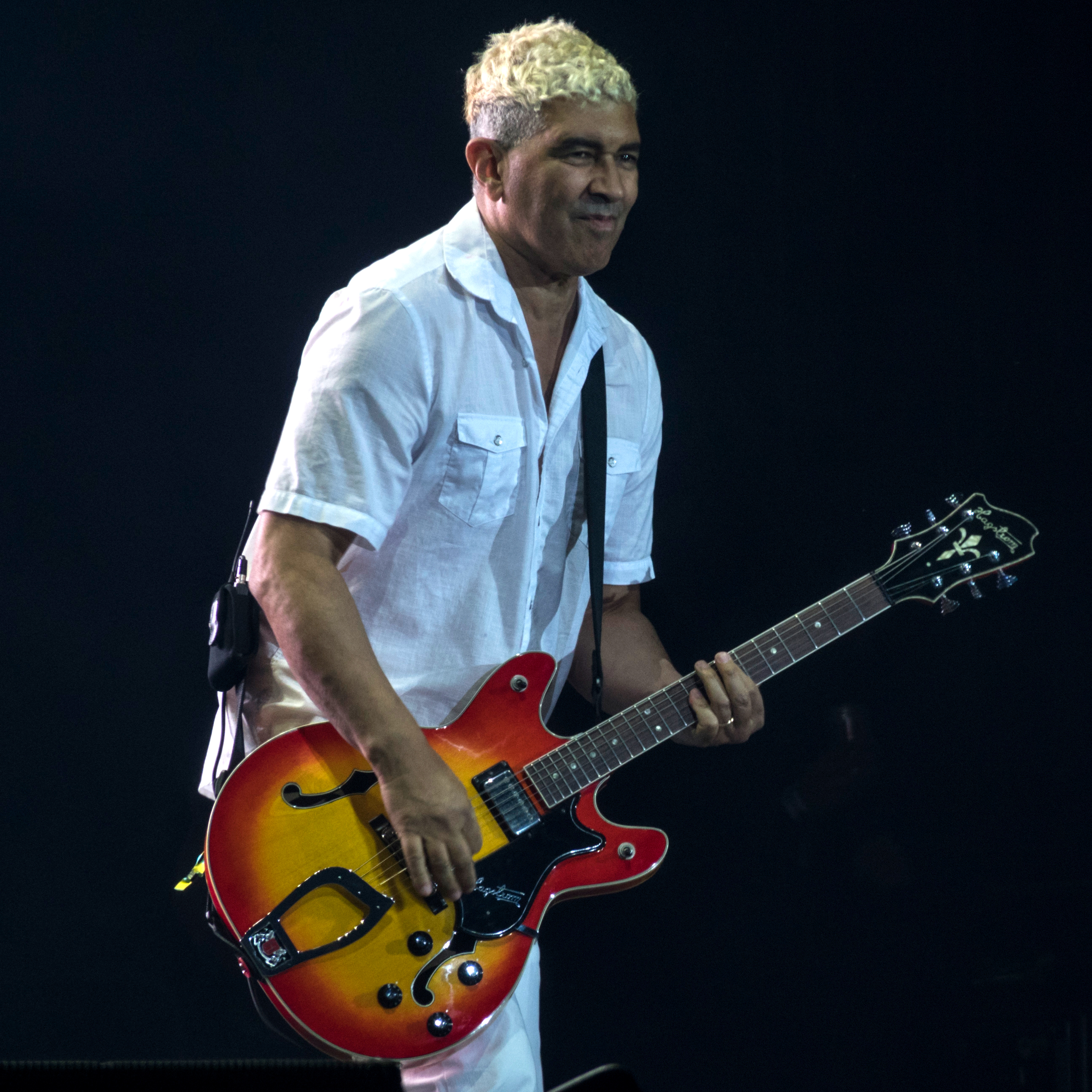
Smear performing with Foo Fighters in 2017

In late 2005, Smear began performing select shows with Foo Fighters again. He continued to play intermittently with the group, often not for the entirety of a concert, as a touring musician for the next five years. Smear appeared with the Foo Fighters as an additional musician on their live acoustic album, Skin and Bones (2006), contributing acoustic and electric guitar. He was also featured as a guest musician on the group's sixth studio album, Echoes, Silence, Patience & Grace (2007), playing rhythm guitar on the track "Let It Die." Smear described his participation as "the oddest recording experience I had with Foo Fighters", given he had no input in composition and was "going in and playing on a song that was already written".

In August 2010, Foo Fighters began recording their seventh studio album, Wasting Light, with producer Butch Vig. The recording sessions were documented on the band's website and Twitter, with Smear being present in many of the photos that were posted. A December press release confirmed that Smear was part of the project and was considered a core member of the band once again, becoming the band's third guitarist alongside Grohl and Chris Shiflett. The album was released on April 12, 2011, marking the group's first studio release with Smear as an official member since The Colour and the Shape in 1997. Wasting Light debuted at number one in twelve countries and was the first Foo Fighters album to top the United States' Billboard 200 chart. The album and its songs were nominated for five Grammy Awards, including Album of the Year. The record won the Best Rock Album award, while "White Limo" was chosen as the Best Hard Rock/Metal Performance and "Walk" won both Best Rock Performance and Best Rock Song.

Smear continued his work with the band on their follow-up album Sonic Highways (2014). Every song on the album was written and recorded in a different city across the United States and features guest musicians with ties to that city's musical history. The process was filmed for a companion television series, Foo Fighters: Sonic Highways, which was broadcast on HBO in the months surrounding the album's release. Sonic Highways was released on November 10, 2014, and debuted at number two on the Billboard 200.

In 2017, the Foo Fighters released their ninth studio album, Concrete and Gold. Smear once again performed guitar on all tracks, as well as contributed percussion on the songs "Run" and "Happy Ever After (Zero Hour)". The group's tenth studio album, Medicine at Midnight, was released on February 5, 2021, and went on to win three Grammy Awards, including Best Rock Album. Five days after the release of the album, Foo Fighters were announced as one of the 2021 Rock and Roll Hall of Fame nominees in their first year of eligibility. They were officially selected as part of the 2021 induction class on May 12, 2021.

On October 30, 2021, Smear was inducted into the Rock and Roll Hall of Fame as a member of the Foo Fighters. His former bandmate from The Germs, Belinda Carlisle, was inducted the same year as a member of The Go-Go's.

Smear appeared alongside his bandmates in the comedy horror film, Studio 666, directed by BJ McDonnell. The film was released on February 25, 2022, and received mixed reviews.

In January 2026, the band announced that Smear would be taking a temporary hiatus from touring with the band due to Smear sustaining an ankle injury; Jason Falkner stepped in to replace him.

=== Nirvana reunions ===
During the Foo Fighters' Friday night performance at Bumbershoot Festival on August 29, 1997, Nirvana bassist Krist Novoselic joined his former bandmates Dave Grohl and Pat Smear on stage for the Foo's encore to salute the late Kurt Cobain. Grohl took his position on drums, Novoselic played bass, and Smear accompanied on guitar. A spotlight encompassed the microphone stand to honor Cobain, who died by suicide on April 5, 1994. They performed a cover of Prince's "Purple Rain", after which a roadie for the Foo Fighters joined them on stage and sang a version of Led Zeppelin's "Communication Breakdown".

On December 22, 2010, the remaining members of Nirvana played together during a Foo Fighters show at Paladino's in Tarzana, California, which was recorded for a documentary.

On December 12, 2012, Smear, Novoselic and Grohl reunited again for a televised Live Aid Hurricane Sandy benefit. This time, they were fronted by Paul McCartney. They performed "Cut Me Some Slack", the first track from the film soundtrack for Sound City.

On December 15, 2012, they performed "Cut Me Some Slack" on Saturday Night Live, once again fronted by McCartney.

On July 19, 2013, Smear, Novoselic and Grohl reunited on-stage, again with Paul McCartney, during both the first and second encores of McCartney's "Out There" tour stop at Safeco Field, Seattle. They performed "Cut Me Some Slack", as well as numerous Beatles' songs.

On April 11, 2014, Nirvana was inducted into the Rock and Roll Hall of Fame. Though Smear was not inducted, he joined Dave Grohl and Krist Novoselic on stage for performances of Nirvana songs along with Joan Jett, Lorde, St. Vincent and Kim Gordon.

The surviving Nirvana members reunited yet again with Joan Jett, Deer Tick's John McCauley, as well as The Distillers' Brody Dalle for a six-song encore set to close out Cal Jam 18 on Saturday, October 6, 2018, at Glen Helen Amphitheater in San Bernardino, California.

On September 27, 2026, Smear, Novoselic, and Grohl reunited once more to accept the Video Vanguard Award during the 2026 MTV Video Music Awards.

== Gear ==
Smear is closely associated with Hagström guitars, after buying one toward the end of his time in the Germs and using them as his preferred model for many years. He collaborated on designing a signature guitar with the company. Smear now primarily uses Gibson guitars. He can be seen with classic models such as a White SG Custom or a Les Paul but mostly custom shop variations on the rare Johnny A model. Smear also uses a Gibson Barney Kessel model guitar while playing with the Foo Fighters.

For the MTV Unplugged in New York performance, Smear used a Harmony Buck Owens American model acoustic guitar, which belonged to Krist Novoselic.

== Personal life ==
According to the 2011 documentary Foo Fighters: Back and Forth, Smear was married at the time and has at least one child.

== Discography ==
With the Germs

- Forming/Sexboy (1977)
- Lexicon Devil (1978)
- (GI) (1979)
- The Decline of Western Civilization Soundtrack (1980)
- What We Do Is Secret (1981)
- Live at the Whisky, First Show Ever (1981)
- Germicide (1985)
- (MIA) The Complete Anthology (1993)

With The Martyrs

- Pig Pen Victim / Social Sacrifice (7") (1979)

With 45 Grave

- Black Cross/Wax (1981)

With Twisted Roots

- Pretentiawhat (1981)
- Twisted Roots (Comp.) (2004)

With Vagina Dentata

- "Work Till Your Dead" – Flipside Video Fanzine Number Five (Comp.) (VHS) (1984)
- "Golden Boys" – Flipside Vinyl Fanzine Vol. 2 (Comp.) (1985)
- "Creep Street" – Chaotic Reasoning Vol. 2 (Comp.) (2012)

With Tater Totz

- Alien Sleestacks From Brazil (Unfinished Music Volume 3) (1988)
- Mono! Stereo: Sgt. Shonen's Exploding Plastic Eastman Band Request (1989)
- Tater Comes Alive! (Tot Live! If You Want It!) (1992)

With Gary Celebrity

- Diary Of A Monster (1992)

Solo

- Ruthensmear (1987)
- "Lazybones" – Every Band Has A Shonen Knife Who Loves Them (Various Artists Shonen Knife Tribute Comp.) (1989)
- So You Fell in Love with a Musician... (1992)

With Deathfolk

- Deathfolk (1989)
- Deathfolk II (1992)

With Belinda Carlisle

- Real (1993)

With Hole

- Circle 1 (1993)

With Nirvana

- MTV Unplugged in New York (1994)
- From the Muddy Banks of the Wishkah (1996)
- Nirvana (2002)
- With the Lights Out (2004)
- In Utero 20th Anniversary Deluxe Edition (2013)
- Live and Loud (2013)

With Skull Control

- "Electric Church" – Radio Danger (1994)

With Mike Watt

- Ball-Hog or Tugboat? (1995)
- "Ring Spiel" Tour '95 (2016)

With Foo Fighters

- The Colour and the Shape (1997)
- Skin and Bones (2006; additional player)
- Echoes, Silence, Patience & Grace (2007; guest player on track 2)
- Live at Wembley Stadium (2008; additional)
- Wasting Light (2011)
- Sonic Highways (2014)
- Saint Cecilia (2015)
- Concrete and Gold (2017)
- Medicine at Midnight (2021)
- But Here We Are (2023)
- Your Favorite Toy (2026)

With Paul McCartney

- "Cut Me Some Slack" (2012)

With theHell

- Southern Medicine (2013)
