= Germicide (album) =

Germicide (Live at The Whisky, 77)

Live album by the Germs
- Released: 1981
- Recorded: June 1977—Whisky a Go Go, Los Angeles, California
- Genre: Punk rock
- Label: Mohawk Records/ROIR (CD rerelease on Bomp Records)

Germicide, also known as Germicide: Live at the Whisky, 1977, is a live album by the punk rock band the Germs. Performing live at the Whisky a Go Go in 1977, Darby Crash and the Germs were at the beginning of their career. At this time, Crash performed using the name Bobby Pyn. Darby and the audience feud constantly throughout the show. Disc jockey Rodney Bingenheimer appears at the beginning as master of ceremonies, and the band's former drummer Dottie Danger (Belinda Carlisle) briefly takes the mic to introduce the band, who she describes as "sluts".

== Track listing ==
1. Forming
2. Sex Boy
3. Victim
4. Street Dreams
5. Let's Pretend
6. Get a Grip
7. Suicide Machine
8. Sugar, Sugar
9. Teenage Clone (Wild Baby)
10. Grand Old Flag

== Personnel ==
- Bobby Pyn (Jan Paul Beahm, a.k.a. Darby Crash) – vocals
- Pat Smear (Georg Ruthenberg) – guitars
- Lorna Doom (Teresa Ryan, a.k.a. Terry Target) – bass
- Donna Rhia (Becky Barton) – drums
