= Darby Crash Band =

American music project

- Spinoff of: Germs
- Past members: Darby Crash (vocals); Pat Smear (guitar); David "Bosco" Danford (bass); Lucky Lehrer (drums)

The Darby Crash Band was a music project started by Darby Crash and Pat Smear, founding members of Los Angeles punk rock band the Germs, formed after the Germs split in 1980. They recruited bassist David "Bosco" Danford and Circle Jerks drummer Lucky Lehrer and began playing shows in Los Angeles. The group's setlists would include a number of well-known songs from the Germs' archives, as well as newly written material. The band never recorded and played only a small number of shows before Crash's death on December 7, 1980.

There are no studio recordings available. However, a digitally remastered live recording of the band playing at the Starwood, in West Hollywood, is due for release on CD format.

== Band members ==
- Darby Crash (vocals)
- Pat Smear (guitar)
- David "Bosco" Danford (bass)
- Lucky Lehrer (drums)
