= Gibson Barney Kessel =

Hollow body guitar by Gibson, 1961 to 1974

Barney Kessel
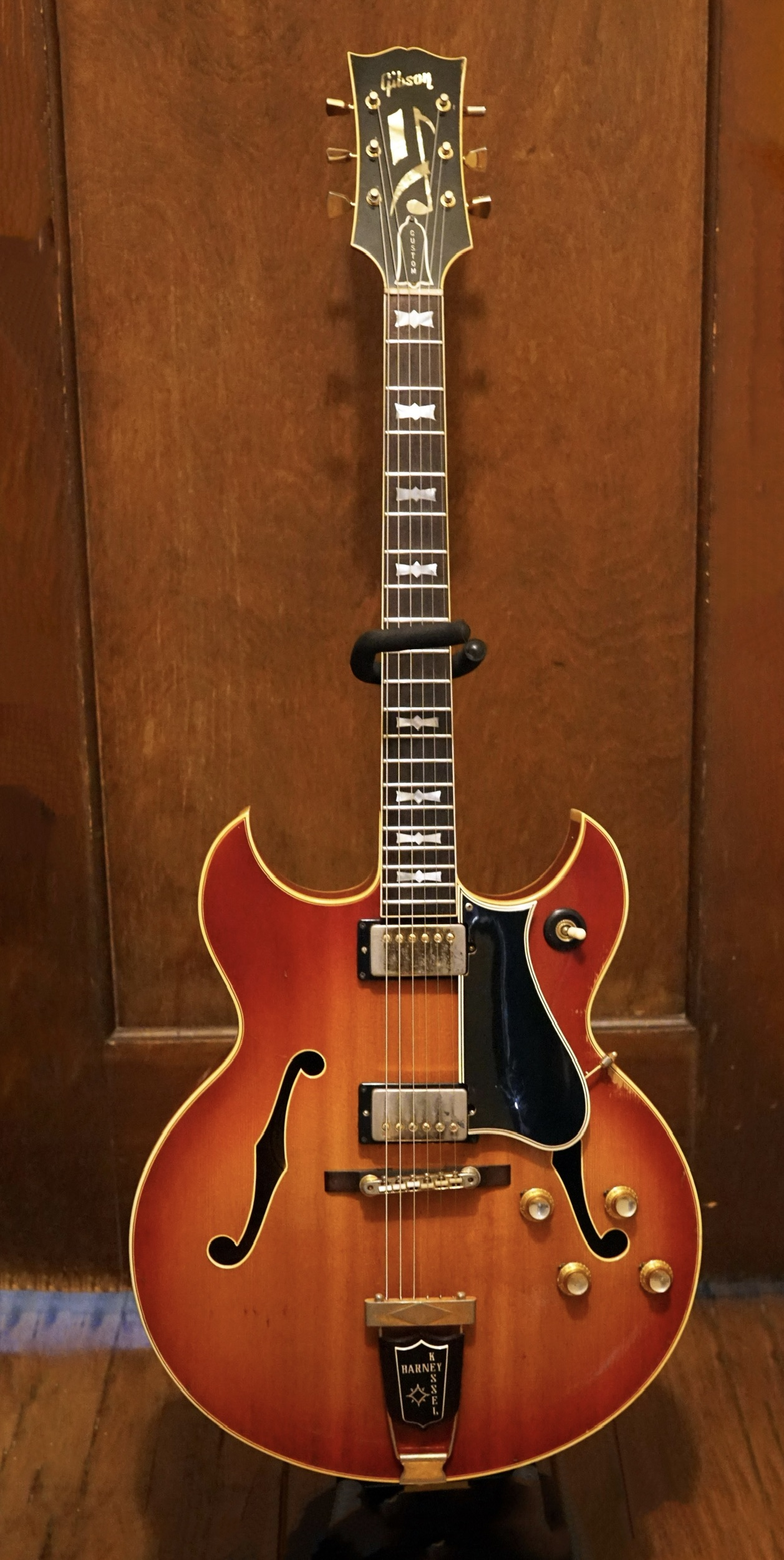
- 1964 Gibson Barney Kessel custom
- Manufacturer: Gibson Brands
- Period: 1961–1974

Construction
- Body type: Semi-hollow body thinline
- Scale: 25 1/2"

Woods
- Body: Spruce and Maple
- Neck: Mahogany
- Fretboard: Brazilian rosewood

Hardware
- Bridge: Rosewood
- Pickup: Humbuckers

Colors available
- Sunburst

The Gibson Barney Kessel (1961–1974) is a signature model guitar manufactured by the Gibson Guitar Company. The guitar was a signature model for the popular Jazz musician Barney Kessel. The guitar was not popular and in 1974 Gibson discontinued production.

== History ==
In 1960 Barney Kessel was a popular guitar player and the Gibson Guitar Company pursued him; wanting to put his name on a jazz guitar signature model. The Barney Kessel artist model was released in 1961 and was produced until 1974. The guitar was available in two versions: a regular model and a Custom model. When the guitar debuted in 1961 the Barney Kessel regular retailed for $395 and Barney Kessel custom retailed $560.

== Specifications ==
The guitar was a hollow-body intended for Jazz music. The body featured a double cutaway design. The guitar had a spruce top, maple sides and back, two Humbucker pickups, a mahogany neck and a Brazilian rosewood fretboard with double-parallelogram inlays on the regular version and bowtie inlays on the Custom model. The custom was considered to be the deluxe version and it had more elaborate inlays and gold plated metal parts.

Both the regular and custom models featured a wooden badge fitted in the trapeze tailpiece which had Barney Kessel's name engraved on it. The bridge was wooden and constructed from rosewood.

== Reception ==
The Barney Kessel artist model did not sell well. The shipping numbers show that 1968 was the best year for sales of the guitar (371). By 1974 Gibson stopped producing the guitar because jazz was no longer popular and Gibson's relationship with Kessel was strained. At times Barney Kessel played the model with a piece of tape covering the Gibson logo on the headstock. Over the years many of the Barney Kessel guitars have been stripped for parts, since individual parts are worth more than selling the guitar whole.

Gibson produced 1117 Barney Kessel regular and 740 Barney Kessel custom during the twelve years. Sales in the 1970s were far less than the 1960s.

== Notable players ==
- Barney Kessel
- Nile Rodgers
- Pat Smear
- Blake Mills
- Ed Cherry
- Trini Lopez
