= Rick Gonzalez =

American actor (born 1979)

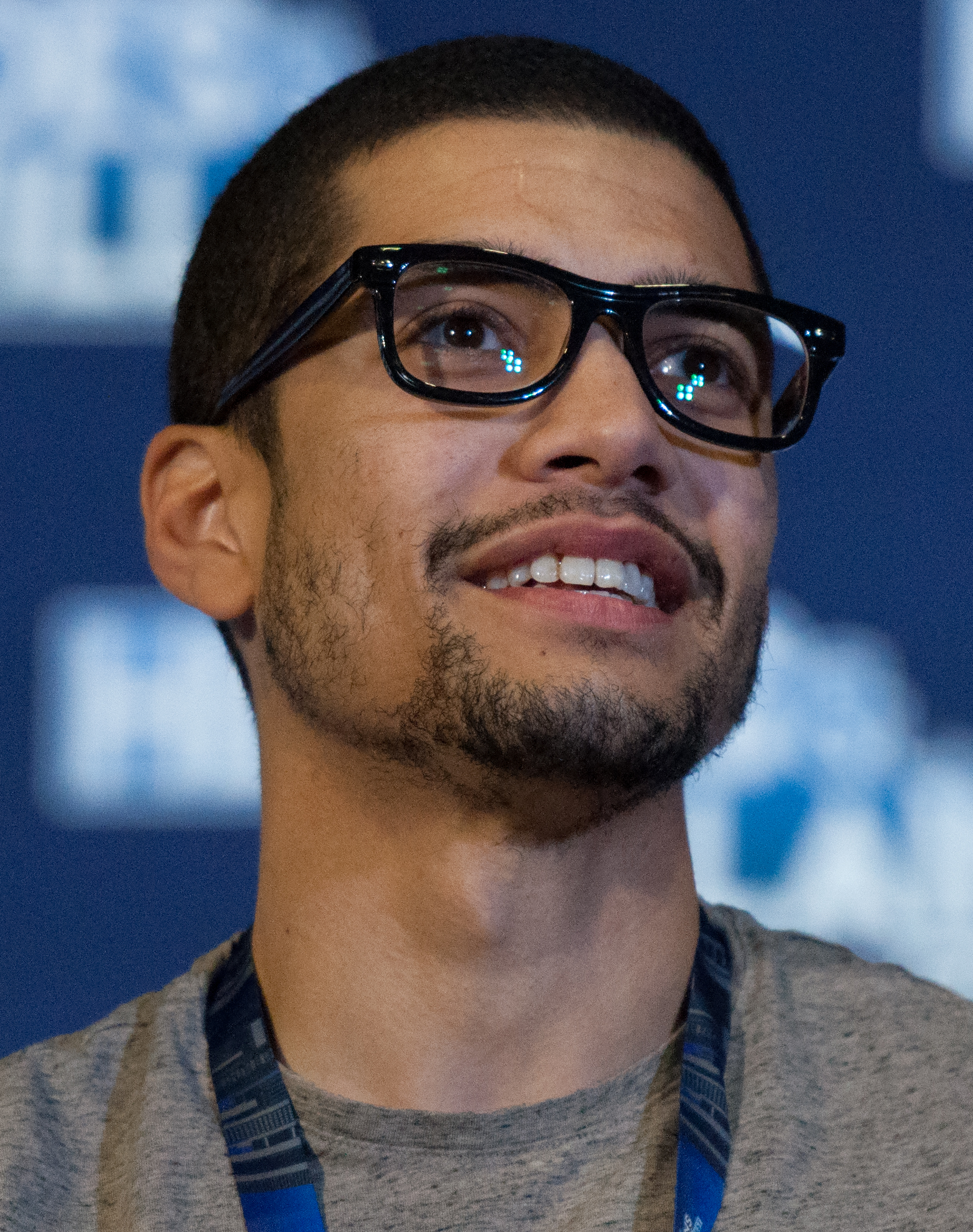
- Gonzalez at the 2017 Heroes and Villains Fan Fest
- Born: June 30, 1979 (age 47); New York City, U.S.
- Occupation: Actor
- Years active: 1998–present
- Spouse: Sherry Aon
- Children: 1

Ricardo Gonzalez (born June 30, 1979) is an American actor. He is known for his roles as Timo Cruz in the motion picture Coach Carter, as Spanish in Old School, as Ben Gonzalez on the CW supernatural drama television series Reaper, and as Naps In Roll Bounce. From 2016–2020, he portrayed the superhero vigilante character Rene Ramirez / Wild Dog on the CW superhero drama series Arrow. In 2021, he starred in the TV series adaptation of The Lost Symbol. In 2022, he joined the cast of Law & Order: Organized Crime as Detective Bobby Reyes.

== Early life ==
Gonzalez was born in New York, of Dominican and Puerto Rican descent. His parents met in Washington, DC, where they married. They moved and settled down in the Bushwick section of Brooklyn where they raised Gonzalez. His parents were later divorced. He attended elementary and junior high school while living in Brooklyn. Ever since he was a young child, Gonzalez would put on improvised "shows" for his family and participate in all of his school's plays. His teachers were instrumental in convincing Gonzalez to apply and try out for LaGuardia High School of the Performing Arts, on which Fame was based, in Manhattan. He did as suggested and was accepted. In 1997, he graduated and began to pursue a career in acting.

== Career ==
Gonzalez started his acting career in New York, where he landed a small role in the made for television movie Thicker Than Blood (1998) as Sanchez. In 1999, he made his feature movie debut as Ricky in the movie Mambo Cafe, which was released in the year 2000. He followed that by participating in the film Prince of Central Park (2000) before heading for Los Angeles, California.

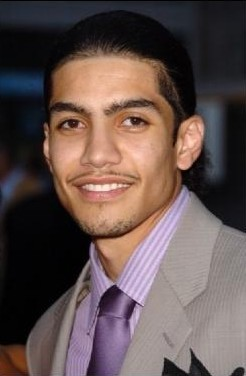
Gonzalez in 2005

In Hollywood, he landed a small part as a gangbanger in the 2001 film Crocodile Dundee in Los Angeles. He followed that with the roles of Rudy Bonilla in The Rookie, starring Dennis Quaid and as the sex-crazed Primo in the 2003 movie Biker Boyz. In 2005, he played the role of Timo Cruz in the movie Coach Carter. Gonzalez also appeared in Twista's video "Hope", which is the lead single off the Coach Carter movie soundtrack. He played the male lead in Mashonda's "Back of Tha Club" video; and has also starred in the video to the Obie Trice song "Snitch", where he plays a member of a group who successfully pull off a bank robbery, and then snitches on them. Gonzalez was also in Red Cafe's video for "All Night Long" which was also in the Coach Carter movie soundtrack.

Gonzalez has appeared in the 2003 comedy Old School (alongside Luke Wilson, Vince Vaughn and Will Ferrell) as "Spanish", Laurel Canyon (2003) as Wyett, Subway Cafe (2004) as Vincent Young, War of the Worlds (2005) as Vincent, Roll Bounce (2005) as Naps, Pulse (2006) as Stone, First Snow (2006) as Andy Lopez, Illegal Tender (2007) as Wilson DeLeon Jr., What We Do Is Secret (2007) as Pat Smear. He also appears in Apartment 143 as Paul Ortega.

His TV guest appearances have been in Law & Order: Special Victims Unit (2000), Touched by an Angel (2001) as Ramone, ER (2001) as Jorge Escalona, Buffy the Vampire Slayer (2002) as Tomas, The Shield (2002), CSI: Miami (2006), Castle (2010), Lie to Me (2010), and Bones (2011). Most recently, he co-starred in the CW television series Reaper as Ben Gonzalez. Gonzalez had a blog about the 2008 MLB Post Season and was nicknamed the "October Gonzo". He co-starred in Lady Gaga's 2011 music video for her single "Judas" where he portrays Jesus. In 2013, Gonzalez appeared in the NCIS episode "Oil & Water", as Lenny Machaca. In 2022, Gonzalez joined the cast of Law & Order: Organized Crime as Detective Bobby Reyes.

=== Music ===
On May 24, 2011, Gonzalez released his mixtape album titled "The Invisible Man". He also appeared on the song "Bully Rap" off of Sean Price's last album Mic Tyson, it was released on October 30, 2012.

== Filmography ==
=== Film ===
Year	Title	Role	Notes
2000	Mambo Café	Ricky	
2000	Prince of Central Park	Gangbanger	
2001	Crocodile Dundee in Los Angeles	Gang Banger	
2002	The Rookie	Rudy Bonilla	
2002	Laurel Canyon	Wyatt	
2003	Biker Boyz	Primo	
2003	Old School	Spanish	
2004	Subway Cafe	Vincent Young	
2005	Coach Carter	Timo Cruz	
2005	War of the Worlds	Vincent	
2005	Roll Bounce	Naps	
2006	First Snow	Andy Lopez	
2006	Pulse	Stone	
2006	For Your Consideration	Chillaxin' Host	
2007	Game of Life	Gerardo	
2007	What We Do Is Secret	Pat Smear	
2007	Illegal Tender	Wilson DeLeon Jr.	
2007	In the Valley of Elah	Phone Technician	
2008	The Promotion	Ernesto	
2008	Pride and Glory	Eladio Casado	
2010	Flying Lessons	Benji	
2011	Apartment 143	Paul Ortega	
2012	The Guilt Trip	Mark	
2013	Make Your Move	Rene	
2014	Commencement	N/A	
2014	Victor	Pablo	
2015	November Rule	Nick	
2016	179th Street	Chelo Santiago	
2017	Deuces	Papers	
2025	Predator: Killer of Killers	Torres	Voice

=== Television ===
Year	Title	Role	Notes
1997	F/X: The Series	N/A	Episode: "Spanish Harlem"
1998	Thicker Than Blood	Sanchez	Television film
2000	Law & Order: Special Victims Unit	Alfonso Cardenas	Episode: "The Third Guy"
2000	Touched by an Angel	Ramone	Episode: "Living the Rest of My Life"
2000–2001	Boston Public	Juan Figgis	4 episodes
2001	Nash Bridges	Hector	Episode: "Slam Dunk"
2001	ER	Jorge Escalona	Episode: "Quo Vadis?"
2002	The Shield	Lucas	Episode "Pay in Pain"
2002	Buffy the Vampire Slayer	Tomas	Episode: "Help"
2006	CSI: Crime Scene Investigation	Marcus	Episode: "Poppin' Tags"
2006	CSI: Miami	Hector Rivera	Episode: "Backstabbers"
2007–2009	Reaper	Ben Gonzalez	Main role
2009	Medium	Juan Espinosa	Episode: "The Future's So Bright"
2010	Castle	Mickey Carlson	Episode: "The Third Man"
2010	Cold Case	Tut' 82	Episode: "Bombers"
2010	Lie to Me	Raul Campos	Episode: "Headlock"
2010	Dark Blue	Manny Aguilar	Episode: "Shelter of the Best"
2010	The Whole Truth	Ronnie Soto	Episode: "Cold Case"
2011	Traffic Light	Charlie	Episode: "No Good Deed"
2011	The Protector	Jamie Sosa	Episode: "Help"
2011	The Closer	Bruno Perez	Episode: "Star Turn"
2011	Bones	Rick Cortez	Episode: "The Prince in the Plastic"
2012	Bad Girls	Rodrigo	Television film
2012–2014	Dark Prophet	DJ Rashnu	2 episodes
2013	Blue Bloods	Ricky	Episode: "The Bitter End"
2013	Ironside	Platano	Episode: "Uptown Murders"
2013	NCIS	Lenny Machacha	Episode: "Oil & Water"
2014	Rush	Manny Maquis	Main role
2015	Battle Creek	Omar	Episode: "Pilot"
2015	Mr. Robot	Isaac Vera	2 episodes
2016	Bad Dad Rehab	Pierre	Television film
2016–2020	Arrow	Rene Ramirez / Wild Dog	Recurring role (season 5); Main role (seasons 6–8)
2017, 2020	Legends of Tomorrow	Rene Ramirez / Wild Dog	2 episodes
2021	The Lost Symbol	Alfonso Nunez	Main role
2022–2025	Law & Order: Organized Crime	Det. Bobby Reyes	Main role (season 3–5)
2023–2026	Law & Order: Special Victims Unit	Det. Bobby Reyes	Guest Appearances (2 episodes) {seasons 24 and 28}

== See also ==
- List of Puerto Ricans
- List of Dominican Americans
