= Lorna Doom =

American musician (1958–2019)

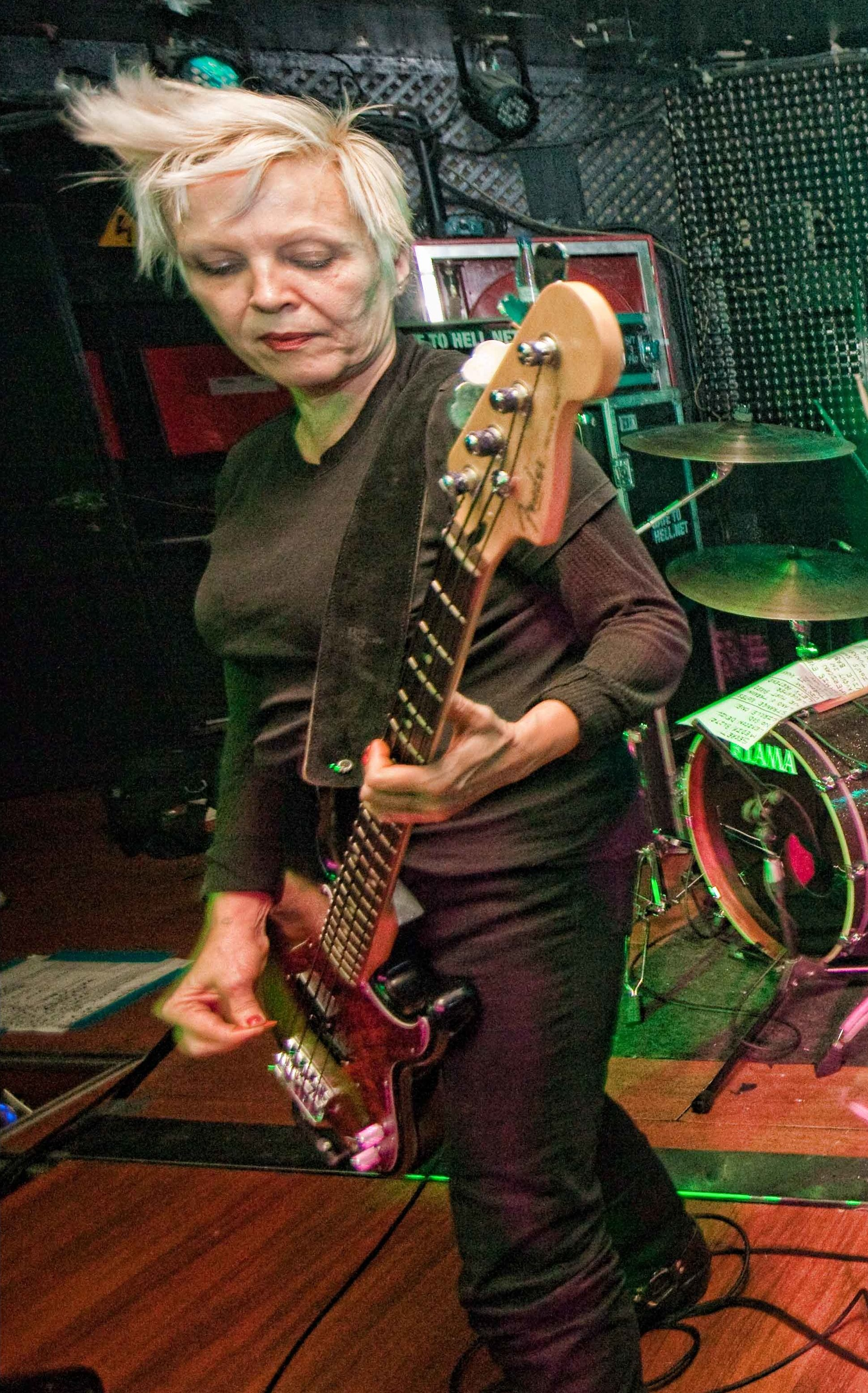
- Lorna Doom performing with the Germs in 2009

Background information
- Born: Teresa Marie Ryan; January 4, 1958; Dallas, Texas, U.S.
- Died: January 16, 2019 (aged 61) Thousand Oaks, California, U.S.
- Genre: Punk rock
- Instrument: Bass
- Years active: 1976−1980, 2005-2009
- Formerly of: Germs

Lorna Doom (born Teresa Marie Ryan, January 4, 1958 – January 16, 2019) was an American musician best known as the bass guitarist for the punk rock band the Germs from 1976 to 1980, and again after they got back together from 2005 to 2009.

== Early life ==
Doom grew up in Thousand Oaks, California, and attended Newbury Park High School, where she met Belinda Carlisle.

== Career ==
Doom was a friend of Germs founders Darby Crash and Pat Smear, and joined despite lack of musical ability, having answered a flyer looking for "two untalented girls" with Carlisle. She originally quit the band in 1980 after Crash fired Don Bolles, the band's drummer. After Crash's death, Doom moved to New York City where she lived until the late 1990s.

A movie based on the Germs, What We Do Is Secret, was released in 2007, and in it, Doom was played by Bijou Phillips. The following year, the band received a star on the Guitar Center RockWalk, which she was present for.

== Death and legacy ==
Doom died of breast cancer on January 16, 2019.

Bassist Kira Roessler spoke about Doom's contribution: "...she was an under-rated musician and, in my mind, quite a presence on the instrument. The Germs were a band that influenced far more people than ever heard them live, and I think Lorna's contribution lives on in that way." Guitarist Greg Hetson recalled seeing her in the 1970s and says she proved "You can rock hard and you don't have to be a guy." Laura Jane Grace tweeted "I can still see the ‘Germs burn’ on my wrist from when I was 14 years old. Few bands had as big of an impact on me. Rest In Peace Lorna Doom." Flea said, "I love Lorna Doom so much, I can't count the times I lay on the floor listening to her play, imagining her rocking out, laying it down in her inimitable way. I always wanted to meet her and never got to, but I feel a bond with her anyways. I admire her always and she is part of who I am. R.I.P. Broken through to the other side Lorna Doom."
