= Darby Crash =

American musician (1958–1980)

- Darby Crash in April 1980

Background information
- Also known as: Bobby Pyn
- Born: Jan Paul Beahm; September 26, 1958; Los Angeles, California, U.S.
- Died: December 7, 1980 (aged 22) Los Angeles, California, U.S.
- Genres: Punk rock; hardcore punk
- Occupations: Singer; songwriter
- Years active: 1975–1980
- Formerly of: Germs; Darby Crash Band

Jan Paul Beahm (better known by his stage name Darby Crash, formerly Bobby Pyn; September 26, 1958 – December 7, 1980) was an American singer who, along with longtime friend Pat Smear, co-founded the punk rock band the Germs and was best known as their lead vocalist. In 1980, he committed suicide by deliberately overdosing on heroin.

== Early life and personal life ==
Jan Paul Beahm had a troubled childhood. While he was still a baby, he and his family lived in Venice, Los Angeles. Later, he grew up in Culver City, California and in West Los Angeles. Beahm grew up believing that his biological father was a man named Harold "Hal" Beahm who had left the family early on in his life.

Beahm lived with his mother, Faith Reynolds-Baker, for much of his life. Their relationship was tumultuous. The accounts given of Reynolds-Baker in Brendan Mullen and Don Bolles's 2002 book Lexicon Devil: The Fast Times and Short Life of Darby Crash and the Germs portray her as having a mental illness, which caused her to behave erratically and to verbally abuse her son.

Reynolds-Baker's third husband, Bob Baker, was a Korean War veteran. He died suddenly of a heart attack in 1972 at age 39. Reynolds-Baker had married Baker in 1964 after a very young Beahm had introduced the idea. Reynolds-Baker never married Beahm's biological father, and Beahm never met him. Not long after Bob Baker's death, Beahm learned that his biological father was also deceased.

Beahm attended Innovative Program School, an alternative school within University High School in Los Angeles, which Beahm dubbed "Interplanetary School". The IPS program combined elements of est large group awareness training and Scientology. Beahm did not take the IPS program seriously. Students in the IPS program were given the liberty to form their own classes. Accordingly, Beahm and fellow student Georg Ruthenberg (later known as Pat Smear) created a class for themselves called Fruit Eating in which they would visit a market, eat fruit for an hour, and then return to school. During their years at Innovative Program School, Beahm and Ruthenberg were frequent users of LSD. They developed a following of other IPS students who also used the drug. The two were accused of brainwashing the other students and causing them to behave subversively, and they were dismissed from the school in 1976.

According to his mother, Beahm later enrolled at Santa Monica College.

Beahm had a five-year plan to become famous and then commit suicide.

== The Germs ==
Not long after their dismissal from IPS, Beahm and Ruthenberg began trying to form a band. Their efforts were inspired by groups like The Runaways and The Stooges. Before they settled on the Germs as a band name, they called themselves Sophistifuck and the Revlon Spam Queens. They reputedly began calling themselves the Germs because they did not have enough money to print T-shirts with a longer band name.

In April 1976, the band added Lorna Doom (born Teresa Ryan) on bass, with transitional member Dottie Danger (later famous as Belinda Carlisle of the Go-Go's) on drums. Carlisle never actually played with the band, as she was sidelined by a bout of mononucleosis for an extended period. She was replaced by her friend Donna Rhia (Becky Barton), who played three gigs and performed on the Germs' first single.

When the Germs formed, the only member who was proficient in playing an instrument was Ruthenberg (who called himself Pat Smear). Beahm initially dubbed himself Bobby Pyn, and he is credited as such on the Germs' first recording. Soon, he jettisoned that moniker in favor of the more overtly menacing Darby Crash, a name that is referred to in the lyrics of the song "Circle One."

A 1979 performance by the Germs was famously captured in Penelope Spheeris's 1981 film The Decline of Western Civilization. The film features a characteristically hectic and sloppy live show in which Crash, heavily intoxicated and under the influence of several drugs, calls to the audience for beer, stumbles and crawls on the stage and slurs lyrics while members of the audience write on him with permanent markers. During an interview in the film, Crash discusses taking drugs onstage to avoid feeling injuries from fan violence and "creeps out there with grudges."

The Germs were well known for their violent, chaotic performances. The chaos was often exacerbated by Crash's drug abuse, which increased steadily over the group's brief lifespan. Eventually, the Germs were banned from nearly every rock club in Los Angeles. The Germs circumvented the ban by playing under the alias G.I. (standing for "Germs Incognito"). By the point at which the Germs were filmed for The Decline of Western Civilization in late 1979, director Spheeris had to rent a soundstage called Cherrywood Studios so the band could play a show outside of the club circuit from which it had largely been blacklisted.

Plagued by Crash's worsening heroin addiction and by live performances that often ended prematurely due to violent conflict between audience members and the Los Angeles Police Department, the Germs disintegrated in May 1980.

Crash then traveled to Britain, where he became heavily enamored with the music of Adam and the Ants and adopted an Adam Ant–inspired new look that included a mohawk. Upon his return to the U.S., Crash formed the very short-lived Darby Crash Band. Circle Jerks drummer Lucky Lehrer joined the ill-fated ensemble on the eve of its first live performance after Crash kicked out the drummer the band had rehearsed with during soundcheck and convinced Pat Smear to act as the group's guitarist. Smear described the band as "like the Germs, but with worse players".

On December 3, 1980, an over-sold Starwood hosted a final live show of the reunited Germs, including drummer Don Bolles. At one point, Crash told the amazed kids in the audience, "We did this show so you new people could see what it was like when we were around. You're not going to see it again".

== Death ==
Crash committed suicide by overdosing on heroin on December 7, 1980 in a house in the Fairfax District section of Los Angeles.

Crash's friend Casey Cola Hopkins was with him at the time of his death. Casey and Crash had made a death pact, but Casey ended up surviving. Before his death, Crash wrote a short note to Darby Crash Band bassist David "Bosco" Danford. The note said, "My life, my leather, my love goes to Bosco".

Before his death, Crash had contacted Smear with an idea for a Germs "reunion" show. Smear has said Crash told him privately he wanted to earn money for heroin to use in committing suicide. Since Crash had described this scenario many times in the past, Smear did not take him seriously.

Crash's death was largely overshadowed by that of John Lennon, who was killed in New York one day later.

Crash is interred at Holy Cross Cemetery in Culver City.

Following Crash's death, his mother received the Germs' album and merchandise royalties due to a deal Crash made with Bug Music Publishing a few months prior to his death.

== In popular culture ==
Crash and the Germs are the subject of the 2007 biopic What We Do Is Secret, which starred Shane West as Crash, Bijou Phillips as Lorna Doom, Rick Gonzalez as Pat Smear, and Noah Segan as Bolles.

American professional wrestler Darby Allin's ring name is derived from Crash's name.

Sonic Youth released a song titled "Thunderclap for Bobby Pyn" on its album The Eternal.
