= Don Bolles (musician) =

American drummer

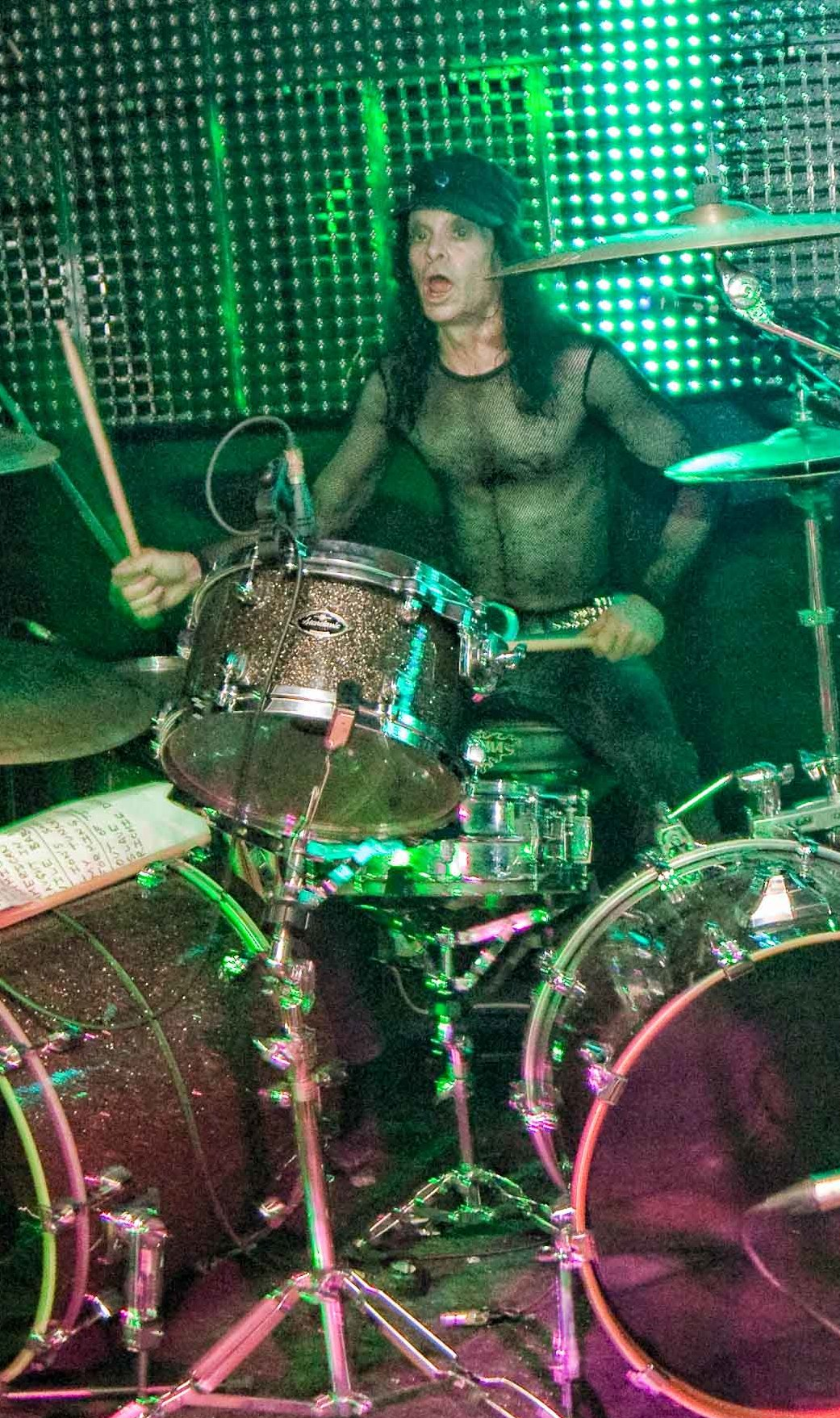
- Bolles in 2009

Background information
- Born: Jimmy Michael Giorsetti; July 30, 1956 (age 70); Phoenix, Arizona, United States
- Genres: Punk rock, horror punk, deathrock, gothic rock, hard rock
- Instrument: Drums

Jimmy Michael Giorsetti (born July 30, 1956), also known by the moniker Don Bolles, is an American drummer. He was involved in the 1970s and 1980s punk scene in Los Angeles, California, performing with Germs, Nervous Gender, 45 Grave and Celebrity Skin. Prior to relocating to LA in February 1978, Bolles had played in several Phoenix punk bands, including Heavy Metal Frogs, Kray-Zee Homicide, Liars and the Exterminators.

He took his stage name from Arizona journalist Don Bolles, who was killed by a car bomb in 1976 while investigating a land fraud case with connections to the Mafia. Concurrent with his performing with Celebrity Skin, Bolles was a DJ for the short-lived radio station Mars FM. He has continued to DJ and produce events throughout L.A., as well as work with other musicians, most recently, recording and touring with Ariel Pink. Pink and Bolles co-produced and played multiple instruments on Water Tower's album Fly Around.

Bolles co-authored the 2002 book Lexicon Devil: The Fast Times and Short Life of Darby Crash and the Germs.
