= List of American female country singers =

This is a list of American female country singers.

== A ==
- Kay Adams
- Julien Aklei
- Lauren Alaina
- Daniele Alexander
- Jessi Alexander
- Susie Allanson
- Deborah Allen
- Rosalie Allen
- Amy Allison
- Liz Anderson
- Lynn Anderson
- Ingrid Andress
- Jessica Andrews
- Sheila Andrews
- Lisa Angelle
- Susan Anton
- Katie Armiger
- Susan Ashton

== B ==
- Joan Baez
- Katherine Bailess
- Kelsea Ballerini
- Veronica Ballestrini
- Kelleigh Bannen
- Ava Barber
- Mandy Barnett
- Gabby Barrett
- Joanie Bartels
- Molly Bee
- Stephanie Bentley
- Barbi Benton
- Matraca Berg
- Crystal Bernard
- Carolyn Beug
- Bonnie Bishop
- Jeanne Black
- Ronee Blakley
- Priscilla Block
- Nicki Bluhm
- Suzy Bogguss
- Debby Boone
- Mae Boren Axton
- Sarah Borges
- Jenn Bostic
- Crystal Bowersox
- Margie Bowes
- Danielle Bradbery
- Dale Ann Bradley
- Michelle Branch
- Kippi Brannon
- Jennifer Brantley
- Cait Brennan
- Camille Bright-Smith
- Logan Brill
- Lane Brody
- Karen Brooks
- Alison Brown
- Bonnie Brown
- Lacey Brown
- Maxine Brown
- Shannon Brown
- Jann Browne
- Sherry Bryce
- Laura Bryna
- Samantha Bumgarner
- Pat Bunch
- Laura Bell Bundy
- Wilma Burgess
- Pearl Butler
- Sarah Buxton

== C ==
- Sera Cahoone
- Cam
- Ashley Campbell
- Laura Cantrell
- Lindsey Cardinale
- Brandi Carlile
- Paulette Carlson
- Kim Carnes
- Mary Chapin Carpenter
- Jenny Lou Carson
- Martha Carson
- Anita Carter
- Carlene Carter
- Deana Carter
- Helen Carter
- Janette Carter
- Maybelle Carter
- Sara Carter
- Caitlin Cary
- Neko Case
- June Carter Cash
- Rosanne Cash
- Connie Cato
- Jean Chapel
- Lana Chapel
- Beth Nielsen Chapman
- Cee Cee Chapman
- Marshall Chapman
- Mary Jo Chelette
- Kristin Chenoweth
- Jessie Chris
- Claudia Church
- Brandy Clark
- Kelly Clarkson
- Patsy Cline
- Candy Coburn
- Anita Cochran
- Tammy Cochran
- Betty Cody
- Kellie Coffey
- Aileeah Colgan
- Jessi Colter
- Shelly Colvin
- Amie Comeaux
- Kendal Conrad
- Anna Coogan
- Elizabeth Cook
- Kristy Lee Cook
- Rita Coolidge
- Wilma Lee Cooper
- Helen Cornelius
- Joanna Cotten
- Anna Craig
- Melodie Crittenden
- Sheryl Crow
- Bobbie Cryner

== D ==
- Lisa Daggs
- Kimberley Dahme
- Amy Dalley
- Lacy J. Dalton
- Dale Daniel
- Helen Darling
- Sarah Darling
- Velva Darnell
- Gail Davies
- Linda Davis
- Skeeter Davis
- Stephanie Davis
- Jennifer Day
- Star De Azlan
- Roxie Dean
- Penny DeHaven
- Grey DeLisle
- Iris DeMent
- Kassie DePaiva
- Daisy Dern
- Amber Dotson
- Dottsy
- Donna Douglas
- Shelby Dressel
- Whitney Duncan
- Clare Dunn
- Holly Dunn

== E ==
- Stacey Earle
- Sheena Easton
- Connie Eaton
- Brooke Eden
- Meredith Edwards
- Ella Langley
- Katrina Elam
- Alecia Elliott
- Hannah Ellis
- Ralna English
- Erika Jo
- Dale Evans
- Sara Evans
- Mae Estes

== F ==
- Barbara Fairchild
- Shelly Fairchild
- McKenna Faith
- Donna Fargo
- Rachel Farley
- Juni Fisher
- Rosie Flores
- Connie Francis
- Paula Frazer
- Adrianna Freeman
- Dori Freeman
- Janie Fricke
- Edith Frost

== G ==
- Kristin Garner
- Mary Gauthier
- Crystal Gayle
- Ashley Gearing
- Bobbie Gentry
- Terri Gibbs
- Susan Gibson
- Teea Goans
- Tammy Graham
- Terry Gregory
- Patty Griffin
- Nanci Griffith
- Emily Grove
- Cady Groves
- Bonnie Guitar
- Mickey Guyton

== H ==
- Lucy Hale
- Connie Hall
- Kristen Hall
- Jennifer Hanson
- Arlene Harden
- Gus Hardin
- Linda Hargrove
- Joni Harms
- Jessica Harp
- Emmylou Harris
- Kree Harrison
- Ali Harter
- Lisa Hartman Black
- Kerry Harvick
- Lindsey Haun
- Amber Hayes
- Susan Haynes
- Lisa Heller
- Jessie Mae Hemphill
- Terri Hendrix
- Caroline Herring
- Faith Hill
- Goldie Hill
- Kim Hill
- Becky Hobbs
- Kelly Hogan
- Rebecca Holden
- Jolie Holland
- Terri Hollowell
- Georgia Holt
- Mallary Hope
- Nikki Hornsby
- Billie Jean Horton
- Rita Hosking
- Julianne Hough
- Jan Howard
- Rebecca Lynn Howard
- Donna Hughes
- Sierra Hull
- Luanne Hunt
- Angela Hunte

== I-J ==
- Julienne Irwin
- Sonya Isaacs
- Wanda Jackson
- Jana Jae
- Jessie James Decker
- Mickie James
- Joanna Janét
- Sarah Jarosz
- Penny Jay
- Jewel
- Eilen Jewell
- Sarah Johns
- Carolyn Dawn Johnson
- Lois Johnson
- Diana Jones
- Norah Jones
- Naomi Judd
- Wynonna Judd

== K ==
- Candye Kane
- Krystal Keith
- Joanie Keller
- Kristen Kelly
- Mary Ann Kennedy
- Cheyenne Kimball
- Jill King
- Caroline Kole
- Jana Kramer
- Alison Krauss

== L ==
- La Costa
- Skylar Laine
- Holly Lamar
- Miranda Lambert
- Cristy Lane
- Nikki Lane
- Ella Langley
- Kasey Lansdale
- Shelly Lares
- Nicolette Larson
- Cyndi Lauper
- Buffy Lawson
- Melissa Lawson
- Brenda Lee
- Jesse Lee
- Joni Lee
- Robin Lee Bruce
- Scooter Lee
- Zella Lehr
- Danni Leigh
- Sonia Leigh
- Linda Gail Lewis
- Margaret Lewis
- Kelli Lidell
- Hillary Lindsey
- LaWanda Lindsey
- Meghan Linsey
- Lissie
- Peggy Little
- Amy Loftus
- Lizzy Long
- Bonnie Lou
- Laura Love
- Lydia Loveless
- Patty Loveless
- Ruby Lovett
- Lauren Lucas
- Rachele Lynae
- Judy Lynn
- Lera Lynn
- Loretta Lynn
- Shelby Lynne

== M ==
- Mary MacGregor
- Rose Maddox
- Natalie Maines
- Daisy Mallory
- Barbara Mandrell
- Irlene Mandrell
- Louise Mandrell
- Lorene Mann
- Margaret Durante
- Krista Marie
- Sarah Marince
- Linda Martell
- Bobbi Martin
- Janis Martin
- Judy Martin
- Marilyn Martin
- Mila Mason
- Louise Massey
- Lisa Matassa
- Kathy Mattea
- Billie Maxwell
- Aimee Mayo
- Martina McBride
- Ashley McBryde
- Coley McCabe
- Lila McCann
- Charly McClain
- Maureen McCormick
- Rose Marie McCoy
- Mindy McCready
- Jennette McCurdy
- Reba McEntire
- Elaine "Spanky" McFarlane
- Vicky McGehee
- Maria McKee
- Lori McKenna
- Kim McLean
- Dana McVicker
- Robin Meade
- Kristen Merlin
- Tift Merritt
- Jo Dee Messina
- Georgia Middleman
- Jody Miller
- Julie Miller
- Kassie Miller
- Patti Miner
- Beverley Mitchell
- Priscilla Mitchell
- Katy Moffatt
- Ashley Monroe
- Patsy Montana
- Melba Montgomery
- Moonshine Kate
- Abra Moore
- Allison Moorer
- Lorrie Morgan
- Megan Moroney
- Maren Morris
- Cashavelly Morrison
- Nana Mouskouri
- Megan Mullins
- Kacey Musgraves
- Heather Myles

== N ==
- Leigh Nash
- Nikki Nelson
- Shirley Collie Nelson
- Tracy Nelson
- Jennifer Nettles
- Heidi Newfield
- Juice Newton
- Rosie Nix Adams
- Gabbie Nolen
- Norma Jean
- Alecia Nugent

== O-P ==
- Mollie O'Brien
- Molly O'Day
- Jamie O'Neal
- Joan Osborne
- K. T. Oslin
- Marie Osmond
- Bonnie Owens
- Sunny Ozell
- Patti Page
- Allison Paige
- Rissi Palmer
- Gwyneth Paltrow
- Hayden Panettiere
- Caryl Mack Parker
- Alison Parson
- Dolly Parton
- Stella Parton
- Jody Payne
- Carly Pearce
- Danielle Peck
- Peggy Sue
- Gretchen Peters
- Kellie Pickler
- Sasha Pieterse
- Pink Nasty
- Celinda Pink
- Mary Kay Place
- Cassadee Pope
- Sandy Posey
- Rachel Potter
- Angaleena Presley
- Margo Price
- Becky Priest
- Rachel Proctor
- Jeanne Pruett
- Missi Pyle

== R ==
- Terry Radigan
- RaeLynn
- Missy Raines
- Bonnie Raitt
- Rattlesnake Annie
- Susan Raye
- Megan Redmond
- Julie Reeves
- Ronna Reeves
- Bebe Rexha
- Geri Reischl
- Kim Richey
- Jeannie C. Riley
- LeAnn Rimes
- Emily Ann Roberts
- Julie Roberts
- Mica Roberts
- Betty Jean Robinson
- Karyn Rochelle
- Judy Rodman
- Tammy Rogers
- Lulu Roman
- Linda Ronstadt
- Caitlin Rose
- Liz Rose
- Maggie Rose
- Pam Rose
- Shawna Russell

== S ==
- Maggie Sajak
- Mary Sarah
- Leslie Satcher
- Haley Scarnato
- Hillary Scott
- Dawn Sears
- Gwen Sebastian
- Pebe Sebert
- Jeannie Seely
- Marilyn Sellars
- Aubrie Sellers
- Shana
- Maia Sharp
- Rosemary Sharp
- Terri Sharp
- Sunday Sharpe
- Victoria Shaw
- Jean Shepard
- Ashton Shepherd
- Kalie Shorr
- Lizzie Sider
- Jenny Simpson
- Jessica Simpson
- Nancy Sinatra
- Margie Singleton
- Alina Smith
- Connie Smith
- Joanna Smith
- Margo Smith
- Mindy Smith
- Sammi Smith
- Shawnee Smith
- Sissy Spacek
- Billie Jo Spears
- Jamie Lynn Spears
- Karen Staley
- Roba Stanley
- Star Anna
- Lisa Stewart
- Laurie Stirratt
- Christy Sutherland
- Sunny Sweeney
- Rachel Sweet
- Taylor Swift
- Sylvia

== T ==
- Brette Taylor
- Cathie Taylor
- Doreen Taylor
- Kim Taylor
- Karen Taylor-Good
- Chalee Tennison
- Ashley Tesoro
- Texas Ruby
- Elvie Thomas
- Sue Thompson
- Cyndi Thomson
- Marsha Thornton
- Cortney Tidwell
- Pam Tillis
- Karen Tobin
- Holly Tucker
- Tanya Tucker
- Leah Turner
- Mary Lou Turner
- Bonnie Tyler
- Kris Tyler
- Ryan Tyler

== U-V ==
- Donna Ulisse
- Carrie Underwood
- Harvie June Van
- Vicki Vann
- Sharon Vaughn
- Adia Victoria
- Gina Villalobos
- Rhonda Vincent
- Jenna von Oÿ

== W-Z ==
- Cindy Walker
- Tamara Walker
- Taylor Ware
- Jennifer Warnes
- Sara Watkins
- Gillian Welch
- Kitty Wells
- Dottie West
- Emily West
- Shelly West
- Casey Weston
- Cheryl Wheeler
- Karli Whetstone
- Cheryl White
- Joy Lynn White
- Lari White
- Sarah White
- Sharon White
- Audrey Williams
- Dar Williams
- Holly Williams
- Leona Williams
- Lucinda Williams
- Kelly Willis
- Bridgette Wilson
- Gretchen Wilson
- Lainey Wilson
- Stephanie Winslow
- Kate Wolf
- Lee Ann Womack
- Marion Worth
- Chely Wright
- Ginny Wright
- Ruby Wright
- Tammy Wynette
- Trisha Yearwood
- Adrienne Young
- Andrea Zonn
