= Deep Dream (album) =

Studio album by Richard James Simpson
- Released: April 12, 2019
- Studio: Kitten Robot Studios
- Length: 49:25
- Label: Rehlein Music
- Producers: Richard James Simpson, Jack Waterson, Paul Roessler, Mark Reback, Jill Emery

Richard James Simpson chronology
Sweet Birds of Youth (2017)	Deep Dream (2019)	Sugar the Pill (2021)

Professional ratings
Review scores
Source	Rating
Indie for Bunnies	7/10 stars

Deep Dream is the second solo studio album by American rock musician Richard James Simpson, released in April 2019 by Rehlein Music. It contains 17 songs, most of them written by Simpson with three co-written by his former Teardrain bandmate, bassist Jill Emery, and one co-written by Dustin Boyer. Two songs feature members of Simpson's 1990s band Teardrain. Most of the tracks were produced by Simpson himself, with three produced by Paul Roessler, and one by Teardrain and Jack Waterson. The album features Don Bolles from the Germs, Dustin Boyer from the John Cale band, and Ygarr Ygarrist from Zolar X. It combines traditional songs with several short experimental pieces. Simpson was inspired by David Bowie's late 1970s albums Low and Heroes, as well as the work of film composers Pino Donaggio, Fred Karlin, Michael Small, and Vangelis.

The album was recorded in Los Angeles and San Francisco, and at Paul Roessler's Kitten Robot Studios. It was mastered by Geza X, who previously worked with Simpson on his 2017 debut album Sweet Birds of Youth.

== Track listing ==
No.	Title	Writer(s)	Producer	Length
1.	"Dream 1"	Richard James Simpson	Richard James Simpson	0:09
2.	"ON2U"	Simpson	Simpson	2:12
3.	"Know"	Simpson	Simpson	4:31
4.	"Ice on Your Lips"	Simpson	Simpson	0:32
5.	"Mary Shoots 'Em First"	Simpson	Paul Roessler	5:25
6.	"Free"	Simpson	Roessler	3:15
7.	"Half Brother, Half Clouds"	Simpson	Simpson	1:49
8.	"I Couldn't Be Happier" (feat. Teardrain)	Simpson	Simpson	2:23
9.	"Job" (feat. Teardrain)	Simpson, Jill Emery	Simpson, Emery, Mark Reback, Jack Waterson	5:00
10.	"My Psychedelic Mother"	Simpson	Simpson	3:16
11.	"The Giver"	Simpson	Simpson	2:15
12.	"Pieces of You"	Emery, Simpson	Simpson	3:40
13.	"Sugar Blue Inn"	Simpson	Simpson	3:31
14.	"Primrose Bob"	Simpson	Simpson	3:11
15.	"The Walls Have Ears"	Simpson, Emery	Simpson	1:34
16.	"Human (Like I Versus Like Me)"	Simpson, Dustin Boyer	Simpson	2:18
17.	"Cell"	Simpson	Roessler	4:35

== Personnel ==
Credits are adapted from the Deep Dream liner notes.

Musicians

- Richard James Simpson – vocals, guitar, sonic painter, soundscapes, percussions
- Dustin Boyer – bass, synthesizer
- Don Bolles – drums
- Jill Emery – bass, backing vocals
- Miguel Angel Infanzon – spoken word
- Mike Koenig – soundscape
- Joi Parker – spoken word
- Mark Reback – drums
- Paul Roessler – synthesizer, backing vocals
- Wilton – bass
- Geza X – guitars
- Ygarr Ygarrist – guitars, drums, bass, synthesizers

Production

- Richard James Simpson – producer
- Paul Roessler – producer
- Jack Waterson – producer
- Mark Reback – producer
- Jill Emery – producer
- Geza X – mastering
- Jessee Vidaurre – design
