= Sweet Bird of Youth (disambiguation) =

Sweet Bird of Youth is a 1959 play by Tennessee Williams.

Sweet Bird of Youth may also refer to:

== Film and TV ==
- Sweet Bird of Youth (1962 film), 1962 adaptation of the play starring Paul Newman and Geraldine Page
- Sweet Bird of Youth, 1987 short film by Zeinabu irene Davis
- Sweet Bird of Youth (1989 film), TV adaptation of the play starring Elizabeth Taylor and Mark Harmon

== Music ==
- "Sweet Bird of Youth", 1967 song by The Five Americans released as the B-side to "Zip Code"
- Sweet Bird of Youth, 2000 album by The Rock*A*Teens
- Sweet Birds of Youth, 2017 album by Richard James Simpson
