= Living with You =

Single by John Cale

from the album Shifty Adventures in Nookie Wood
- Released: 25 February 2013
- Genre: Alternative rock
- Length: 4:03
- Label: Double Six Records
- Songwriter(s): John Cale
- Producer(s): John Cale

John Cale singles chronology
"Face to the Sky" (2012)	"Living with You" (2013)	"All Summer Long" (2013)

"Living with You" is a song by Welsh musician and composer John Cale. It was released as a digital single on 25 February 2013. It was the third single from Cale's new album Shifty Adventures in Nookie Wood. Music and lyrics was written by Cale himself. As B-side of this single are "Living with You (Organic Mix)" and "Living with You (Laurel Halo remix)".

The original studio version of the song "Living with You" featured alongside Cale (vocals, keyboards, percussion, electric viola, electric guitar) also Dustin Boyer (gut guitar) and Michael Jerome Moore (drums, cajón).
