= Stobaugh =

Stobaugh is a surname. Notable people with the surname include:

- Fred Stobaugh (1917–2016), oldest artist to appear on Hot 100
- Robert B. Stobaugh (1927–2017), American educator
