= Jacob Colgan =

American singer-songwriter and Entrepreneur

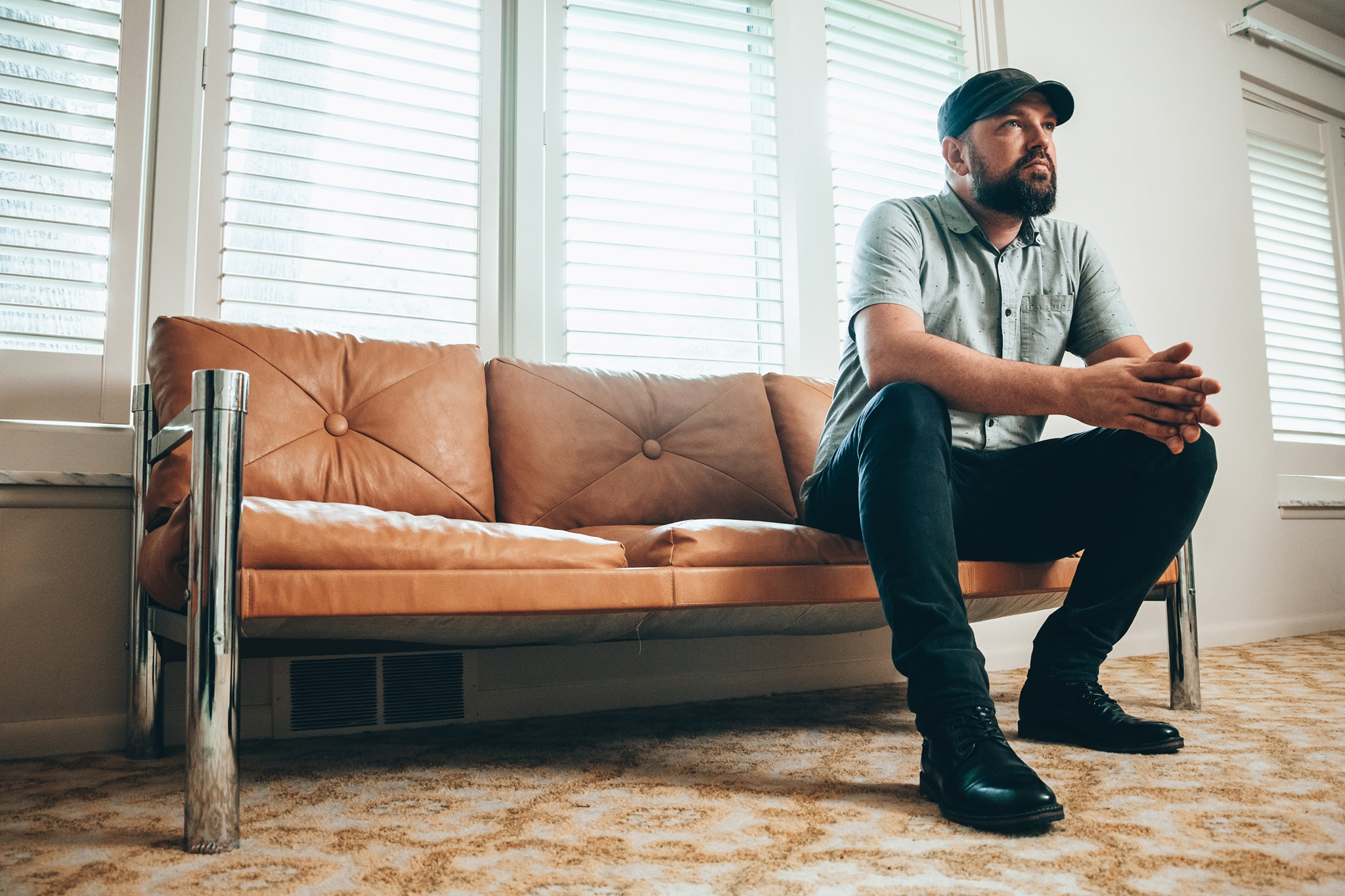
Jacob Colgan (2022)

Jacob Colgan is an American singer, songwriter, producer and the CEO of Green Shoe Studio and Green Shoe Records. In 2013, he performed and produced "Oh Sweet Lorraine" for Fred Stobaugh. The song, which was the focus of the viral short documentary A Letter From Fred, subsequently entered the Billboard Hot 100 as well as other international charts. On September 19, 2013, Colgan was a guest on The View where he performed the song. He was also impersonated by Blake Shelton during Shelton's guest host appearance on Saturday Night Live in the sketch "My Darlin Joan." Colgan is the brother of country singer Aileeah Colgan and regularly co-writes and produces her music. Jacob is also a host on the podcast The Chasing Mountains Podcast.
