= All Summer Long =

All Summer Long may refer to:

- All Summer Long (album), a 1964 album by the Beach Boys
  - "All Summer Long" (The Beach Boys song), the title song
- "All Summer Long" (Kid Rock song), 2008
- "All Summer Long" (John Cale song), 2013
- All Summer Long (play), a 1954 Broadway play
- "All Summer Long", a song by Chris Rea from the album Shamrock Diaries, 1985
