= All Summer Long (John Cale song) =

Single by John Cale
- B-side: "Sandman (Flying Dutchman)"
- Released: 6 August 2013
- Genre: Alternative rock
- Length: 4:07
- Label: Double Six
- Songwriter: John Cale
- Producer: John Cale

John Cale singles chronology
"Living with You" (2013)	"All Summer Long" (2013)

"All Summer Long" is a song by the Welsh musician and composer John Cale. It was released as a digital single in August 2013, while on the B-side was the song "Sandman (Flying Dutchman)" from Cale's album Shifty Adventures in Nookie Wood from the previous year. "All Summer Long" was released only on this single, but not on any studio album. It was recorded during the recording sessions for Shifty Adventures in Nookie Wood.

The song was created when Cale was in his New York flat, remembering the summer weather in California.

== Track listing ==
All songs written and composed by John Cale

No.	Title	Length
1.	"All Summer Long"	4:07
2.	"Sandman (Flying Dutchman)"	3:42
Total length:		7:47

== Personnel ==
- John Cale – vocals, keyboards, synthesizers, bass, acoustic guitar, tambourine, programming, arrangements, producer
- Dustin Boyer – electric guitar, programming, recording
- Deantoni Parks – drums
- Verde Trio – backing vocals, horns
- Adam Moseley – mixing
- Nita Scott – executive producer
