= Face to the Sky =

Single by John Cale

from the album Shifty Adventures in Nookie Wood
- B-side: "Living with You (Organic Mix)"
- Released: 29 August 2012 (digital download); 25 September 2012 (7")
- Genre: Alternative rock
- Length: 4:57
- Label: Double Six Records
- Songwriter(s): John Cale
- Producer(s): John Cale

John Cale singles chronology
"I Wanna Talk 2 U" (2012)	"Face to the Sky" (2012)	"Living with You" (2013)

"Face to the Sky" is a song by Welsh musician and composer John Cale. It was released as a digital single on 29 August 2012 and as 7" vinyl record on 25 September 2012. It was the second single from Cale's new album Shifty Adventures in Nookie Wood. Music and lyrics was written by Cale himself. As B-side of this single is "Living with You (Organic Mix)". Video for this song, directed by Tom Scholefield (a.k.a. Kon Om Pax), was premiered at Stereogum.

The original studio version of the song "Face to the Sky" featured alongside Cale (vocals, piano, percussion) also Dustin Boyer (electric guitar), Michael Jerome Moore (cajón) and Joey Maramba (bass guitar).
