= Luanne (name) =

Luanne is a given name. Notable people with the name include:

- Luanne Hunt, American singer-songwriter
- Luanne Koskinen (born 1940), American politician
- Luanne Martineau (born 1970), Canadian artist
- Luanne Maurice (born 1972), Mauritian swimmer
- Luanne Metz, Canadian politician and clinical neurologist
- Luanne Peterpaul, American politician, lawyer, and judge
- Luanne Rice (born 1955), American novelist
- Luanne Spadea (born 1972), American tennis player
- LuAnne Thompson, American professor
- Luanne Van Werven (born 1957), American politician
