= Richard James Simpson =

American singer-songwriter

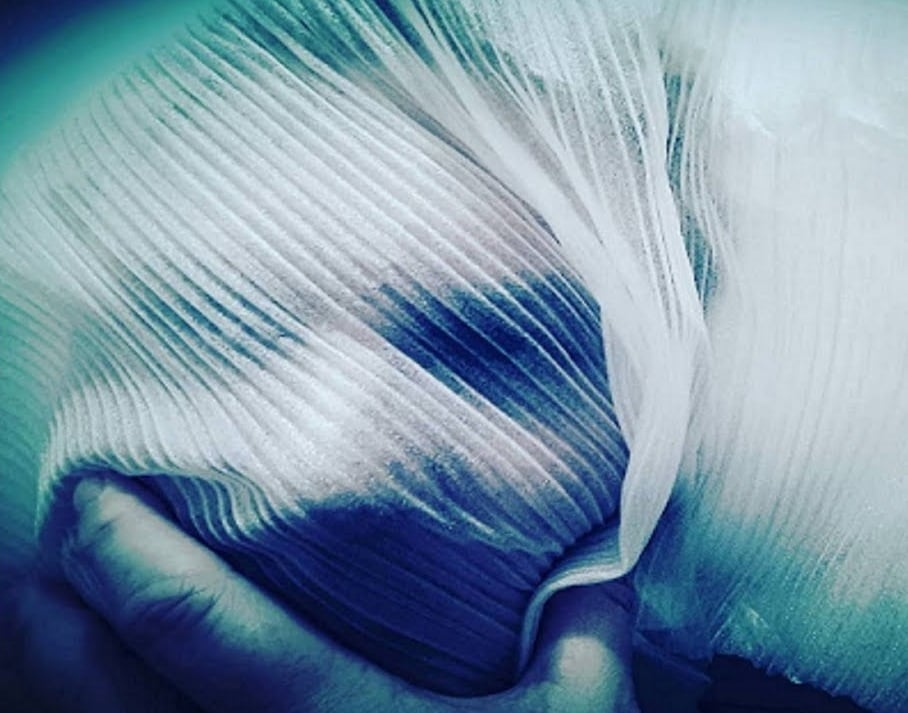

Background information
- Born: Richard James Simpson
- Genres: Alternative rock
- Occupation: Musician
- Instrument: Guitar
- Labels: Rehlein Music
- Formerly of: Invisible Chains, Teardrain

Richard James Simpson, formerly known as Richard James (born 1967), is an American singer and guitarist. He is a son of Renate Hoy, an actress born in Germany, and attorney Raymond C. Simpson. He grew up in the South Bay region of California and had an older brother Charles "Rock" Halsey who was a member of Rock Bottom & the Spys.

As a teenager, Simpson was a member of Invisible Chains as a bass player. The band recorded one eponymous album but disbanded later on. In the 1990s, he fronted a band called Teardrain, which also featured Jill Emery and Mark Reback on bass and drums respectively.

He released his debut solo album in 2017. It is called Sweet Birds of Youth and features eighteen songs. Among those playing on the album are Joey Burns (from Calexico) on cello, Theodore Welch on drums as well as Dustin Boyer, who co-produced the record and plays various instruments. The album was mastered by Geza X. Two songs from this album, "Roller" and "Taking Sides" were used in feature movie The Letter Red.

Simpson released his second solo album Deep Dream in April 2019. Over its seventeen songs, the albums features contributions from Dustin Boyer, Don Bolles (Germs), Paul Roessler, Ygarr Ygarrist (Zolar X) and two songs feature the original lineup of Simpson's 1990s band Teardrain – bassist Jill Emery and drummer Mark Reback. Jill Emery also co-wrote and co-produced other songs on the record. The album was mastered by Geza X.

In December 2021, Simpson released his third album Sugar the Pill.

== Discography ==
- Sweet Birds of Youth (2017)
- Deep Dream (2019)
- Sugar the Pill (2021)
