= I Wanna Talk 2 U =

Single by John Cale

from the album Shifty Adventures in Nookie Wood
- Released: 6 July 2012
- Genre: Alternative rock
- Length: 3:32
- Label: Double Six Records
- Songwriter(s): John Cale & Danger Mouse (music); John Cale (words)
- Producer(s): John Cale, Danger Mouse

John Cale singles chronology
"Whaddya Mean By That" (2011)	"I Wanna Talk 2 U" (2012)	"Face to the Sky" (2012)

"I Wanna Talk 2 U" is a song by Welsh musician and composer John Cale. It was released as a digital single on 6 July 2012. It was the first single from Cale's new album Shifty Adventures in Nookie Wood. This single was released only as digital single, but not on CD or vinyl record. Music was composed by Cale along with Danger Mouse (real name Brian Burton) and lyrics by Cale himself.

The song was recorded after Burton asked Cale to contribute to album of The Shortwave Set in 2008.

The original studio version of the song featured alongside Cale (vocals, acoustic guitar, electric guitar, organ, synthesizers, percussion) and Burton (bass guitar, synthesizers, drum programming) also Dustin Boyer (electric guitar).
