= Demonia =

Demonia may refer to:

- Demonia (comics), a DC Comics character
- Demonia (film), a 1990 Italian horror film

== See also ==
- Daemonia (band), an Italian heavy metal band
