= Sweet Birds of Youth =

Studio album by Richard James Simpson
- Released: January 27, 2017
- Length: 47:58
- Label: Rehlein Music
- Producer: Richard James Simpson, Dustin Boyer

Richard James Simpson chronology
Sweet Birds of Youth (2017)	Deep Dream (2019)

Professional ratings
Review scores
Source	Rating
Indie for Bunnies	7/10 stars

Sweet Birds of Youth is the first solo studio album by American rock musician Richard James Simpson, released in January 2017 by Rehlein Music. It contains 18 tracks, all written by Simpson. It combines traditional songs with several short experimental pieces. The majority of the songs were produced by Simpson, with eight tracks co-produced by Dustin Boyer from the John Cale band, and some other tracks co-produced by Joe and Fitch. Boyer plays several instruments on the album, other contributors include Joey Burns from Calexico on cello, and Theodore Welch on drums. It also features Simpson's sister Jennifer singing harmony vocals.

The album was recorded in Los Angeles and San Francisco. It was mastered by Geza X.

== Track listing ==
All tracks written by Richard James Simpson. "Bulls" contains a sample of "Ring of Fire" written by June Carter and Merle Kilgore.

1. "Birds" – 0:15
2. "Bulls" – 3:37
3. "Taking Sides" – 4:02
4. "Moonbeams Arms" – 2:55
5. "I Love You" – 1:10
6. "Roller" – 5:02
7. "Roll 3" – 0:40
8. "You" – 1:19
9. "Moon 1" – 0:27
10. "Never Is Forever" – 4:56
11. "10" – 1:35
12. "Sorrow" – 3:25
13. "Bloodsick" – 4:19
14. "I Can, But I Can't" – 5:12
15. "Roll 4" – 0:23
16. "Sometimes" – 3:31
17. "Spirit Plus" – 3:37
18. "10 Estrellas" – 1:43

== Personnel ==
Credits are adapted from the Sweet Birds of Youth liner notes.

Musicians

- Richard James Simpson – vocals, guitar, bass, keyboards, organ, soundscapes, voice
- Dustin Boyer – bass, drums, keyboards, soundscapes
- Theodore Welch – drums, percussions
- Joe – drums
- Joey Burns – cello, backing vocals
- Maclovia Martel – backing vocals
- Patricia Maertens – backing vocals
- Jennifer Louise Simpson – vocals, voice
- Michelle Marino – voice
- Miguel Infanzon – voice
- Renate Huy – voice
- Tracy Halsey – voice
- Mike Koenig – sound samples

Production

- Richard James Simpson – producer (all tracks except 8)
- Dustin Boyer – producer (2, 3, 6, 10, 12, 13, 14, 16)
- Joe – producer (4, 17)
- Fitch – producer (8)
- Geza X – mastering
- Jessee Vidaurre – design
