= Killer's Carnival =

1966 film

- Directed by: Alberto Cardone; Robert Lynn; Sheldon Reynolds; Louis Soulanes
- Written by: Ernesto Gastaldi; Rolf Olsen; Sheldon Reynolds; Vittorio Salerno
- Produced by: Karl Spiehs
- Starring: Stewart Granger
- Cinematography: Siegfried Hold
- Distributed by: Variety Distribution
- Release date: 11 August 1966
- Running time: 94 minutes
- Countries: France; Austria; Italy
- Languages: English; French; German; Italian
- Box office: 129,757 admissions (France)

Killer's Carnival (French: Carnaval des barbouzes, German: Gern hab' ich die Frauen gekillt, Italian: Spie contro il mondo) is a 1966 crime film directed by Alberto Cardone and starring Stewart Granger.

== Plot ==
A murderer takes refuge in a doctor's home, and the doctor tells him three stories in an attempt to convince him that crime doesn't pay.

== Cast ==
- Stewart Granger as David Porter (Vienna segment)
- Lex Barker as Glenn Cassidy (San Francisco segment)
- Pierre Brice as Agent Brice (Rome segment)
- Karin Dor as Denise (San Francisco segment)
- Pascale Petit as Lotty (Vienna segment)
- Margaret Lee as Agent Linda (Rome segment)
- Walter Giller as Karl (Vienna segment)
- Johanna Matz as Monique Carrar (Vienna segment)
- Klaus Kinski as Gomez (San Francisco segment)
- Agnès Spaak as Nelly Small (San Francisco segment)
- Peter Vogel as Wendt, Suspected girls' killer
- Richard Münch as Professor Alden (Frame story)
- Carmen Cervera as Joana (San Francisco segment) (as Tita Barker)
- Allen Pinson as Ray Runner (San Francisco segment) (as Alan Pinson)
- Herbert Fux as Ganove (Vienna segment)
- Roberto Miali as Pessana (San Francisco segment) (as Jerry Wilson)
- Carla Calò as Female boss (Rome segment) (as Carrol Brown)
- Fortunato Arena as Taxi driver (Rome segment)
- Pietro Ceccarelli as Gangster #3 (Rome segment)
- Luciano Pigozzi as Ivan (Rome segment)
