= Extra Playful =

EP by John Cale
- Released: 19 September 2011
- Genres: Art rock; art pop
- Length: 21:32; 30:27 (Black Edition)
- Labels: Domino; Double Six
- Producer: John Cale

John Cale chronology
Live at Rockpalast (2010)	Extra Playful (2011)	Shifty Adventures in Nookie Wood (2012)

Extra Playful - Black Edition

Professional ratings
Review scores
Source	Rating
PopMatters	6/10 stars

Extra Playful is a 2011 EP by the Welsh singer John Cale. The EP features 5 previously unreleased songs. Black Edition (released on Black Friday) contains two more extra songs.

== Track listing ==
All songs composed and arranged by John Cale.

1. "Catastrofuk" - 3:58
2. "Whaddya Mean by That?" - 5:39
3. "Hey Ray" - 4:16
4. "Pile a L'heure" - 3:38
5. "Perfection" - 4:01
6. "Bluetooth Swings" - 4:39 (Black Edition only)
7. "The Hanging" - 4:16 (Black Edition only)

== Personnel ==
- John Cale − vocals, guitar, bass, keyboards, viola, synthesizer
- Dustin Boyer − guitar, synthesizer, background vocals
- Michael Jerome − drums, percussion, background vocals
- Erik Sanko − bass, background vocals
- Deantoni Parks − drums in "Whaddya Mean by That?"
- Noelle Scaggs − background vocals in "Hey Ray"
- Destani Wolf − background vocals in "Hey Ray"

Technical

- Nita Scott - executive producer
- Dustin Boyer - recording
- Mickey Petralia - mixing
