= Wrath of God (film) =

1968 film

- Directed by: Alberto Cardone
- Written by: Alberto Cardone; Italo Gasperini; Ugo Guerra; José Luis Martínez Mollà
- Produced by: Ugo Guerra; Elio Scardamaglia
- Starring: Brett Halsey
- Cinematography: Mario Pacheco
- Edited by: Alberto Cardone
- Music by: Michele Lacerenza
- Release date: 1968
- Country: Italy

Wrath of God (Italian: L'ira di Dio, Spanish: Hasta la última gota de sangre) is a 1968 Italian-Spanish Spaghetti Western film co-produced, co-written and directed by Alberto Cardone under the pseudonym Albert Cardiff.

== Cast ==
- Brett Halsey (credited as Montgomery Ford) as Mike Barnett
- Fernando Sancho as Burd
- Wayde Preston as Logan
- Dana Ghia as Lena Harris
- Howard Ross as Jessy
- Franco Fantasia as Mark
- Paolo Todisco as Bob
- Adalberto Rossetti as Dan
- Ángel del Pozo as David
- Carlo Pisacane as Sam
- Franco Gulà as Morris

== Production ==
The film was produced by Italian production companies Leone Film and Daiano Film in association with Spanish Atlantida Film. It was the first spaghetti western shot by genre specialist Wayde Preston.

== Reception ==
Rewieving the film, Italian critic Davide Pulici described the film as a 'borderline' spaghetti western, emphasizing a plot which 'exceeds the limits of the absurd in a surreal bric-à-brac that is probably unmatched by anything else in the genre'. Marco Giusti described it as 'baroque' and 'a total delirium'.
