= Beyond Justice =

- DVD cover
- Directed by: Duccio Tessari
- Screenplay by: Adriano Bolzoni; Sergio Donati; Luigi Montefiori
- Produced by: Pio Angeletti; Adriano De Micheli; Guido Lombardo
- Starring: Rutger Hauer; Carol Alt; Omar Sharif; Elliott Gould; Brett Halsey
- Cinematography: Giorgio Di Battista
- Edited by: Mario Morra
- Music by: Ennio Morricone
- Production company: Titanus Films
- Distributed by: Trimark Pictures
- Release date: 1991
- Running time: 113 minutes
- Country: Italy
- Language: English

Beyond Justice, also known as Desert Law, Law of the Desert and Maktub, Law of the Desert, is a 1991 Italian-American action-thriller film directed by Duccio Tessari that was shot in Morocco. The film was edited from the three-part, 300-minute 1989 Italian Canale 5 television miniseries Il principe del deserto.

== Plot ==
When the estranged Moroccan husband (Kabir Bedi) of wealthy corporate head Christine Sanders (Carol Alt) takes their son Robert to Morocco, she hires two operatives (Rutger Hauer and Peter Sands) who specialize in rescuing hostages from terrorists to bring her son back. Robert is brought to his grandfather (Omar Sharif) who wishes the boy to succeed him as the ruler of his tribe.

== Cast ==
- Rutger Hauer as Tom Burton
- Carol Alt as Christine Sanders
- Omar Sharif as Emir Beni-Zair
- Elliott Gould as Red Merchantson
- Kabir Bedi as Moulet Beni-Zair
- Stewart Bick as Daniel
- David Flosi as Robert Sanders
- Brett Halsey as Sal Cuomo
- Peter Sands as James Ross
- Christopher Ahrens as Bodyguard
- Larry Dolgin as Duncan
- D.R. Nanayakkara as El-Mahadi
- David Thompson as Headmaster Bligh
