= Brett Halsey =

American actor

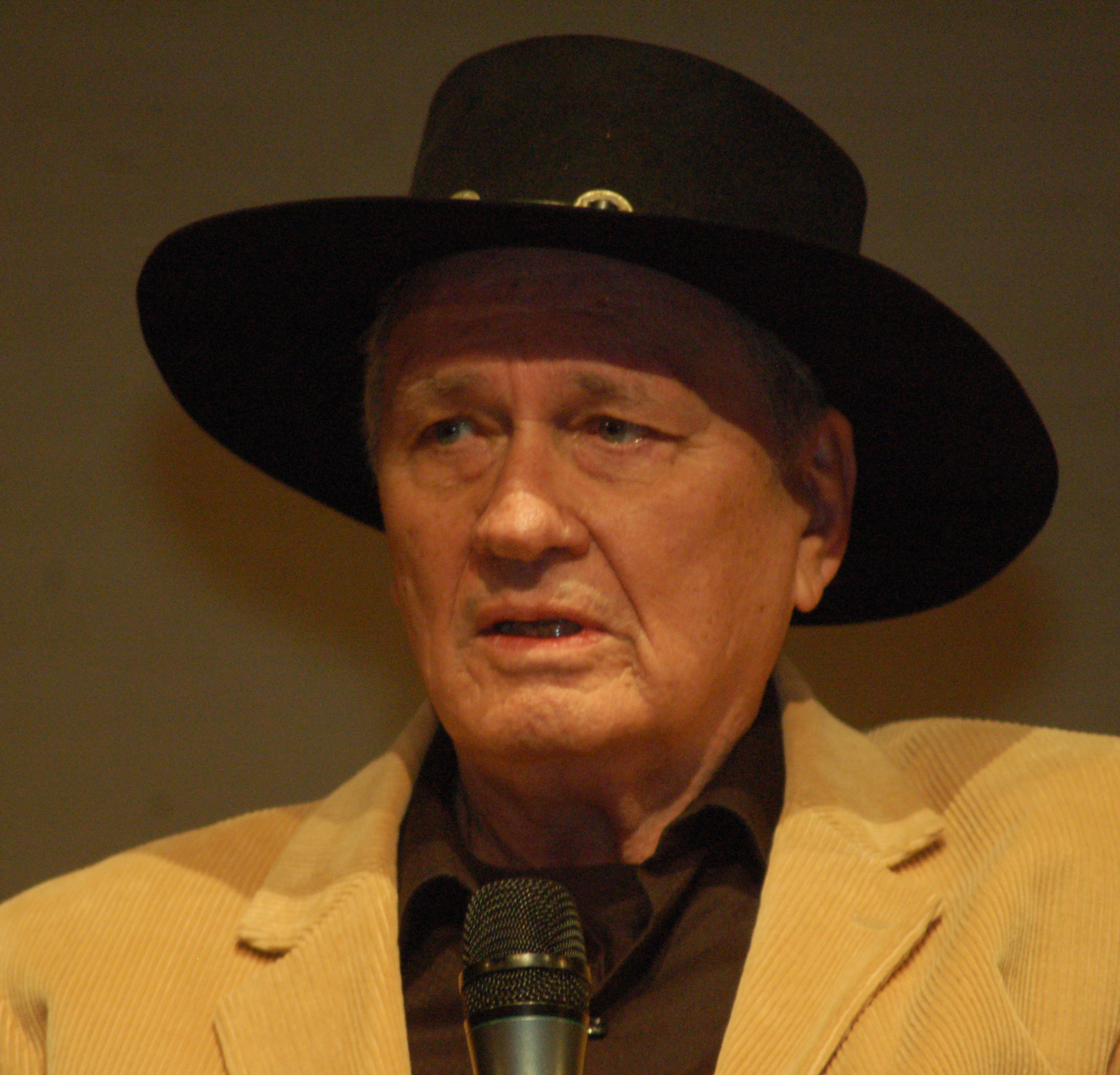
- Halsey in March 2011
- Born: Charles Oliver Hand; June 20, 1933 (age 93); Santa Ana, California, U.S.
- Other name: Montgomery Ford
- Occupation: Actor
- Years active: 1953–2008
- Spouses: Renate Hoy (m. 1954; div. 1959) Luciana Paluzzi (m. 1960; div. 1962) Heidi Brühl (m. 1964; div. 1976): Victoria Korda (m. 19??)
- Children: 5
- Relatives: William Halsey Jr. (great-uncle); Alexander Korda (grandfather-in-law)

Brett Halsey (born Charles Oliver Hand; June 20, 1933) is an American former film actor, sometimes credited as Montgomery Ford. He appeared in B pictures and in European-made feature films. He was the 2nd actor to play the role of John Abbott on the soap opera The Young and the Restless (from May 1980 to March 1981).

Halsey is a great-nephew of the United States Navy Admiral William F. Halsey Jr., also known as Bull Halsey, commander of the Pacific Allied naval forces during World War II. Universal Pictures selected Brett Halsey's acting name from the admiral.

== Career ==
Interested in acting since he was a child, young Brett was employed as a page at CBS Television studios, where he met Jack Benny and Benny's wife, Mary Livingstone, who presented him to William Goetz, the head of Universal-International Pictures, who placed him in a school with other aspiring actors for the studio.

Halsey served in the U.S. Navy during the Korean War, working as a disc jockey.

Halsey appeared as Swift Otter, a Cheyenne Indian in the 1956 episodes "The Spirit of Hidden Valley" and "The Gentle Warrior" of the CBS Western series, Brave Eagle. In that same year he played "Elser" (a troubled teen cowboy) in James Arness's TV Western series Gunsmoke. In 1958, Halsey guest-starred several times as Lieutenant Summers in Richard Carlson's syndicated Western series, Mackenzie's Raiders, a fictional account of cavalry Colonel Ranald S. Mackenzie, set at Fort Clark, Texas. That same year, Halsey had the lead role of a life-saving sailor in an episode of another syndicated series, Highway Patrol. He also appeared in Harbor Command, a military drama about the U.S. Coast Guard. He appeared as Robert Finchley in the 1958 Perry Mason episode, "The Case of the Cautious Coquette", and starred in the Roger Corman teen flick The Cry Baby Killer. In 1959, he had a co-starring role in the science-fiction film The Atomic Submarine. Halsey appeared in the episode "Thin Ice" in 1959 of Five Fingers.

Halsey played supporting and co-starring roles in Hollywood, having appeared in such films as Return of the Fly (1959), Jet Over the Atlantic (1959), The Best of Everything (1959), Return to Peyton Place (1961) and Twice-Told Tales (1963). By the early 1960s, he relocated to Italy where he found himself in demand in adventurous films such as Seven Swords for the King (1962) or The Avenger of Venice (1964), being often cast a swashbuckling hero. He also appeared in a few Spaghetti Westerns and Eurospy films, including Espionage in Lisbon (1965), Kill Johnny Ringo (1966), Today We Kill, Tomorrow We Die! (1968), All on the Red (1968), Twenty Thousand Dollars for Seven (1969) and Roy Colt and Winchester Jack (1970), sometimes using the name Montgomery Ford.

He returned to the United States in the early 1970s and worked in film and television. He appeared in the serials General Hospital and Love Is a Many Splendored Thing, and films such as Where Does It Hurt? (1972) with Peter Sellers. He had supporting roles in higher-profile films such as Ratboy (1986) and The Godfather Part III (1990), and worked with Italian horror director Lucio Fulci on The Devil's Honey (1986), Touch of Death (1988), A Cat in the Brain (1990) and Demonia (1990). He also appeared as the captain of a luxury space liner in the Buck Rogers in the 25th Century episode "Cruise Ship to the Stars", and the Columbo episode "Death Lends a Hand". Later roles include Beyond Justice (1992), starring Rutger Hauer, Expect No Mercy (1995), and the TV movie Free Fall (1999).

== Personal life ==
In 1954, Halsey married Renate Hoy, an actress who had won the Miss Germany contest that year, and who appeared in such films as The Sea Chase with John Wayne. They had two children, son Charles Oliver Hand, Jr. and daughter Tracy Leigh. Halsey and Hoy divorced in 1959. As an adult, their son Charles, known as "Rock Halsey" and "Rock Bottom", was a member of the Los Angeles–based punk rock band Rock Bottom & The Spys. Charles was murdered in prison while serving a 25-year sentence for drug-related crimes.

From 1960 to 1962, Halsey was married to Italian actress Luciana Paluzzi. They had one son, Christian. In 1961, they co-starred as a newlywed couple in the film, Return to Peyton Place. In 1964, Halsey married German actress and singer Heidi Brühl. They had two children, son Clayton Alexander Siegfried and daughter Nicole. They were divorced in 1976. Toward the end of the 1990s, Halsey moved to San José, Costa Rica, to teach film acting. As of 2012, he was living in Laguna Hills with his fourth wife, Victoria (née Korda), granddaughter of Alexander Korda. At that time he was still writing and making occasional film appearances.

== Filmography ==
=== Film ===
- The Glass Web (1953) as Lou, TBC Receptionist (uncredited)
- Ma and Pa Kettle at Home (1954) as Elwin Kettle
- To Hell and Back (1955) as Saunders
- High School Hellcats (1958) as Mike Landers
- The Cry Baby Killer (1958) as Manny Cole
- Lafayette Escadrille (1958) as Frank Baylies
- Submarine Seahawk (1959) as LT (j.g.) David Shore
- Speed Crazy (1959) as Nick Barrow
- Blood and Steel (1959) as Jim
- Return of the Fly (1959) as Philippe Delambre
- The Best of Everything (1959) as Eddie Harris
- Jet Over the Atlantic (1959) as Dr. Vanderbird
- The Atomic Submarine (1959) as Dr. Carl Neilson Jr.
- The Girl in Lovers Lane (1960) as Bix Dugan
- Four Fast Guns (1960) as Johnny Naco
- Desire in the Dust (1960) as Dr. Ned Thomas
- Return to Peyton Place (1961) as Ted Carter
- The Seventh Sword (1962) as Don Carlos di Bazan
- The Magnificent Adventurer (1963) as Benvenuto Cellini
- Twice-Told Tales (1963) as Giovanni Guasconti
- The Avenger of Venice (1964) as Rolando Candiano
- Berlin, Appointment for the Spies (1965) as Bert Morris
- The Hour of Truth (1965) as Fred
- Espionage in Lisbon (1965) as George Farrell, agent 077
- Kill Johnny Ringo (1966) as Johnny Ringo
- Congress of Love (1966) as Stefan Abonyi
- Anyone Can Play (1967) as Norma's husband
- Today We Kill... Tomorrow We Die! (1968) as Bill Kiowa
- All on the Red (1968) as Mike Chapman
- Wrath of God (1968) as Mike Barnett
- Twenty Thousand Dollars for Seven (1969) as Fred Leinster
- Roy Colt & Winchester Jack (1970) as Roy Colt
- Four Times That Night (1971) as Gianni Prada
- Where Does It Hurt? (1972) as Dr. Paolo Quagliomo
- The Devil's Honey (1986) as Dr. Wendell Simpson
- Ratboy (1986) as Mr. Manes
- Touch of Death (1988, Video) as Lester Parson
- A Cat in the Brain (1990) as Human Monster
- The Godfather Part III (1990) as Douglas Michelson
- Demonia (1990) as Professor Paul Evans
- Beyond Justice (1992) as Sal Cuomo
- Expect No Mercy (1995) as Bromfield
- First Degree (1995, Video) as Alonzo Galeno

=== Television ===
Brett Halsey television credits
Year	Title	Role	Notes	Ref.
1956	Gunsmoke	Elser	Episode: "Helping Hand"	
1957	Highway Patrol	Brian Meeker	Episode: "Temptation"	
1958	Perry Mason	Robert Finchley	Episode: "The Case of the Cautious Coquette"	
1958	Harbor Command	Paul Garland	Episode: "Killer on My Doorstep"	
1958	Highway Patrol	Jim Newman	Episode: "Breath of a Child"	
1959	Five Fingers	Iban Ahmed	Episode: "Thin Ice"	
1961–1962	Follow the Sun	Paul Templin	30 episodes	
1971	Columbo	Ken Archer	Episode "Death Lends a Hand"	
1973	Love is a Many Splendored Thing	Spencer Garrison	1 episode	
1974	Search for Tomorrow	Clay Collins	10 episodes	
1977	General Hospital	Dr. Adam Streeter	3 episodes	
1978	Bionic Woman	Dr. Hamilton	1 episode	
1979	Buck Rogers in the 25th Century	Cruise Ship Captain	Episode "Cruise Ship to the Stars"	
1979	The Dukes of Hazzard	Dunlap	Episode: "The Rustlers"	
1980–1981	The Young and the Restless	John Abbot #1		
1982	The Dukes of Hazzard	Carter	Episode: "Enos in Trouble"	
1983	Knight Rider	Clark Sellers	1 episode	
1984	The Dukes of Hazzard	Jason Dillard	Episode: "Dukes in Hollywood"	
1984	Airwolf	Jason Darius	Episode: "Sins of the Past"	
1991	Counterstrike	Senator	Episode: "Native Warriors"	
1993	Gregory K	Judge Thomas S. Kirk	TV movie	
1993	Secret Service	John Kinckley Sr.	1 episode	
1994	TekWar	Frederick Braymar	1 episode	
1994	Kung Fu: The Legend Continues	Tom Jackson	Episode: "The Possessed"	
1995	Almost Golden: The Jessica Savitch Story	Sen. Paul Laxalt	TV movie	
1995	Kissinger and Nixon	Secretary of State William P. Rogers	TV movie	
1995–1996	Kung Fu: The Legend Continues	Commissioner Kincaid	5 episodes	
1999	Free Fall	Chief of Security Tom Mason	TV movie	
2008	Cold Case	Rowland Hughes '08	1 episode	
