= Alberto Cardone =

Italian film director (1920–1977)

- Born: 1920
- Died: 1977 (aged 56–57)
- Years active: 1942 - 1973

Alberto Cardone (16 September 1920 – 20 October 1977) was an Italian film director, screenwriter, second unit director and film editor. He is best known for his Spaghetti Western films of the 1960s, in which he is often credited as Albert Cardiff.

== Life and career ==
Born in Genoa, after the high school disploma Cardone moved to Rome, where in 1942 he debuted the film industry as assistant director of Christian-Jaque in Carmen. He then had several other high profile collaborations as assistant and second unit director, including with William Wyler, Mario Bava, Richard Fleischer, Jules Dassin, Terence Young, Andre de Toth, Roger Vadim, Julien Duvivier, John Brahm, Gregory Ratoff, Curtis Bernhardt and Alberto Lattuada, and also worked in other roles, including film editor, production inspector and screenwriter. As a director, he specialized in the Spaghetti Western genre. His brother Ezio was a camera operator.

== Selected filmography ==
- Black Eagle of Santa Fe (1965)
- Killer's Carnival (1966)
- Seven Dollars on the Red (1966)
- Blood at Sundown (1966)
- Wrath of God (1968)
- Twenty Thousand Dollars for Seven (1969)
