= Hogan's House of Music =

Studio album by Ron Block
- Released: September 25, 2015
- Genre: Country; Bluegrass
- Length: 46:53
- Label: Hogan's House of Music
- Producer: Ron Block

Ron Block chronology
| Walking Song (2013) | Hogan's House of Music (2015) | Carter's Creek Christmas (2015) |

Hogan's House of Music is Ron Block's fourth solo album and his first solo instrumental album. It was released September 25, 2015. Ron Block is best known for being a member of Alison Krauss & Union Station.

== Critical reception ==
Country Standard Time's Fred Frawley writes "Ron Block's Hogan's House of Music works on several levels. The release is a lively and admiring tribute to traditional and bluegrass sounds that made him the player that he is today."

Cybergrass.com says in their review "It’s been a good week for banjo and guitar aficionado Ron Block. Hogan’s House of Music, his first solo instrumental LP, debuted in the #2 slot on the bluegrass sales chart, spending 5 weeks on the chart and missing the top spot by just four units."

The Tennessean's Juli Thanki says "Ron Block is perhaps best known as the banjo player for bluegrass stars Alison Krauss & Union Station, but the instrumental virtuoso also is an acclaimed solo musician. This week he releases Hogan's House of Music, his first all-instrumental record."

John Lawless of Bluegrass Today' writes "Hogan’s House Of Music satisfies on every level. Fans of great picking will revel in the crisp playing and the lovely tones, whiles more general music fans will appreciate the beauty of the original tunes and the classic melodies."

== Track listing ==
All tracks are written by Ron Block, unless otherwise noted

| No. | Title | Writer(s) | Length |
|---|---|---|---|
| 1. | "Smartville" | | 3:01 |
| 2. | "Hogan's House Of Boogie" | | 3:00 |
| 3. | "Wolves A-Howling" | Traditional | 1:45 |
| 4. | "The Spotted Pony" | Traditional | 3:17 |
| 5. | "Clinch Mountain Backstep" | Ralph Stanley | 3:34 |
| 6. | "Gentle Annie" | Stephen Foster | 2:39 |
| 7. | "Mooney Flat Road" | | 3:27 |
| 8. | "Mollie Catherine Carter" | | 3:06 |
| 9. | "Seneca Square Dance" | Traditional | 2:13 |
| 10. | "Calico" | | 3:23 |
| 11. | "You Are My Sunshine" | Jimmie Davis; Charles Mitchell | 3:24 |
| 12. | "Lonesome Road Blues" | Nathaniel Shilkret; Gene Austin | 2:03 |
| 13. | "'65 Mustang Blues" | | 3:57 |
| 14. | "Brushy Fork Of John's Creek" | Traditional | 2:51 |
| 15. | "Carter's Creek Pike" | | 2:37 |
| 16. | "Home Sweet Home" | John Howard Payne; Henry Rowley Bishop | 2:36 |
| Total length: | | | 46:53 |

== Musicians ==
"Smartville"

- Ron Block: Banjo, Rhythm & Lead Guitar
- Barry Bales: Bass
- Tim Crouch: Fiddle
- Jerry Douglas: Dobro
- Clay Hess: Rhythm Guitar
- Adam Steffey: Mandolin

"Hogan's House Of Boogie"

- Ron Block: Banjo, Rhythm & Lead Guitar
- Sam Bush: Mandolin
- Jerry Douglas: Dobro
- Byron House: Bass
- Dan Tyminski: Rhythm Guitar
- Lynn Williams: Snare

"Wolves A-Howling"

- Ron Block: Banjo
- Barry Bales: Bass
- Stuart Duncan: Fiddle
- Adam Steffey: Mandolin
- Dan Tyminski: Rhythm Guitar

"The Spotted Pony"

- Ron Block: Banjo, Rhythm & Lead Guitar
- Barry Bales: Bass
- Stuart Duncan: Fiddle
- Sierra Hull: Octave Mandolin
- Alison Krauss: Fiddle
- Adam Steffey: Mandolin
- Dan Tyminski: Rhythm Guitar
- Lynn Williams: Snare

"Clinch Mountain Backstep"

- Ron Block: Banjo, Rhythm & Lead Guitar
- Barry Bales: Bass
- Stuart Duncan: Fiddle
- Clay Hess: Rhythm Guitar
- Adam Steffey: Mandolin

"Gentle Annie"

- Ron Block: Banjo, Guitar
- Tim Crouch: Fiddles, Cello, Bowed Bass
- Mark Fain: Bass
- Sierra Hull: Octave Mandolin

"Mooney Flat Road"

- Ron Block: Banjo, Rhythm & Lead Guitar
- Barry Bales: Bass
- Stuart Duncan: Fiddle
- Sierra Hull: Octave Mandolin
- Alison Krauss: Fiddle
- Adam Steffey: Mandolin
- Jeff Taylor: Accordion
- Dan Tyminski: Rhythm Guitar
- Lynn Williams: Snare

"Mollie Catherine Carter"

- Ron Block: Banjo, Rhythm & Lead Guitar
- Barry Bales: Bass
- Adam Steffey: Mandolin
- Dan Tyminski: Rhythm Guitar

"Seneca Square Dance"

- Ron Block: Banjo
- Sierra Hull: Mandolin

"Calico"

- Ron Block: Banjo, Lead Guitars
- Tim Crouch: Fiddles, Cello, Djembe, Shaker
- Mark Fain: Bass
- Sierra Hull: Mandolins, Octave Mandolin
- Dan Tyminski: Rhythm Guitar

"You Are My Sunshine"

- Ron Block: Banjo, Lead Guitar solo
- Sam Bush: Mandolin
- Stuart Duncan: Fiddle
- Byron House: Bass
- Dan Tyminski: Rhythm Guitar
- Lynn Williams: Snare

"Lonesome Road Blues"

- Ron Block: Banjo
- Barry Bales: Bass
- Stuart Duncan: Fiddle
- Rob Ickes: Dobro
- Dan Tyminski: Rhythm Guitar
- Lynn Williams: Snare

"'65 Mustang Blues"

- Ron Block: Banjo, Rhythm & Lead Guitar
- Sam Bush: Mandolin
- Jerry Douglas: Dobro
- Byron House: Bass
- Dan Tyminski: Rhythm Guitar
- Lynn Williams: Snare

"Brushy Fork Of John's Creek"

- Ron Block: Banjo, Rhythm & Lead Guitar
- Barry Bales: Bass
- Stuart Duncan: Fiddle
- Adam Steffey: Mandolin
- Dan Tyminski: Rhythm Guitar

"Carter's Creek Pike"

- Ron Block: Banjo
- Barry Bales: Bass
- Sam Bush: Mandolin
- Jerry Douglas: Dobro
- Dan Tyminski: Rhythm Guitar
- Lynn Williams: Snare

"Home Sweet Home"

- Ron Block: Banjo, Lead & Harmony Guitar
- Barry Bales: Bass
- Jerry Douglas: Dobro
- Adam Steffey: Mandolin
- Dan Tyminski: Rhythm Guitar
- Lynn Williams: Snare

== Production ==
- Recorded at Southern Ground, Nashville, Tennessee by Brandon Bell, with assistant engineer Chris Taylor
- Additional recording at Moonlight Canyon Studio, Franklin, Tennessee by Ron Block
- Mixed at New Wine Sound Studio, Apple Valley, California by Eric Uglum and Ron Block
- Mastered at Euphonic Masters by Brad Blackwood
- Art Direction by Josh Peterson
- Package Design by Kate Albie Armstrong
- Photography by Crystal K. Martel
- Management and Booking by Josh Peterson at Music City Management - MusicCityManagement.com
- Publicity by Ronna Rubin at Rubin Media - RubinMedia.biz
- Track information, musician and production credits taken from the album's liner notes.
