= Sugar the Pill =

Studio album by Richard James Simpson
- Released: December 2021
- Studio: Kitten Robot Studios; Rehlein Studios
- Length: 43:21
- Label: Rehlein Music
- Producer: Richard James Simpson, Paul Roessler

Richard James Simpson chronology
| Deep Dream (2019) | Sugar the Pill (2021) |

Professional ratings
Review scores
| Source | Rating |
|---|---|
| Written in Music | 4.5/5 stars |
| Indie for Bunnies | 7.5/10 stars |

Sugar the Pill is the third solo studio album by American rock musician Richard James Simpson, released in December 2021 by Rehlein Music. It contains 12 songs, most of them written by Simpson with one co-written by his former Teardrain bandmate, bassist Jill Emery. Most of the tracks were produced by Simpson himself, with some produced by Paul Roessler. The albums features Don Bolles from the Germs on drums, and Dustin Boyer from the John Cale band playing various instruments.

The album was recorded at Kitten Robot Studios and Rehlein Studios in Los Angeles, California. It was mastered by Geza X, who previously worked with Simpson on both of his previous albums.

== Track listing ==
| No. | Title | Writer(s) | Producer | Length |
|---|---|---|---|---|
| 1. | "Evaporating People" | Richard James Simpson | Richard James Simpson | 3:33 |
| 2. | "Starry Hope" | Simpson, Jill Emery | Paul Roessler | 5:22 |
| 3. | "Sleep" | Simpson | Simpson | 1:00 |
| 4. | "Consensual Telepathy" | Simpson | Simpson | 4:40 |
| 5. | "We're in the Wolf's Mouth" | Simpson | Roessler | 4:21 |
| 6. | "Playing God" | Simpson | Roessler | 3:07 |
| 7. | "Whitney Says" | Simpson | Simpson | 1:42 |
| 8. | "Time, The River" | Simpson | Simpson | 5:47 |
| 9. | "Take It Back" | Simpson | Roessler | 3:00 |
| 10. | "John Can't Hero" | Simpson | Simpson | 4:45 |
| 11. | "The Pink Is Painless" | Simpson | Simpson | 1:42 |
| 12. | "Love Becomes a Stranger" | Simpson | Roessler | 4:27 |

== Personnel ==
Credits are adapted from the Sugar the Pill liner notes.

Musicians

- Richard James Simpson – vocals, guitar, percussions, soundscapes, synthesizers
- Dustin Boyer – bass, drums, guitar, synthesizer
- Don Bolles – drums
- Miguel Angel Infanzon – spoken word
- Paul Roessler – drums, piano, synthesizer
- Grebo Gray – sound manipulations
- Wilton – bass
- Kaitlin Wolfberg – strings

Production

- Richard James Simpson – producer
- Paul Roessler – producer
- Geza X – mastering
- Jessee Vidaurre – design
