= Twenty Thousand Dollars for Seven =

1969 film

- Directed by: Alberto Cardone
- Produced by: Ugo Guerra and Elio Scardamaglia
- Cinematography: Mario Pacheco
- Music by: Michele Lacerenza
- Release date: 1969
- Country: Italy
- Language: Italian

Twenty Thousand Dollars for Seven (Italian: Kidnapping! Paga o uccidiamo tuo figlio, also known as 20.000 dollari sporchi di sangue) is a 1969 Italian Spaghetti Western film directed by Alberto Cardone and starring Brett Halsey.

== Cast ==
- Brett Halsey as Fred Leinster
- Germano Longo as Il falso sceriffo (as Herman Lang)
- Aurora Battista
- Fernando Sancho as Bill Cochran, capo dei banditi
- Eugenio Battisti as Jerry, il bimbo rapito
- Teresa Gimpera as Jane, sua madre
- Antonio Casas as Un bandito
- Howard Ross as Vice-sceriffo
- Marco Gobbi
- Andrea Fantasia
- Gino Marturano
- Claudio Trionfi
- Adalberto Rossetti
- Francisco Sanz as Francisco Mateu Sanz
