= Carla Cassola =

Italian actress (1947–2022)

- Born: 15 December 1947; Taormina, Messina, Italy
- Died: 24 July 2022 (aged 74)
- Occupations: Actress; composer

Carla Cassola (15 December 1947 – 24 July 2022) was an Italian actress and composer.

Born in Taormina, Italy, before starting her acting career Cassola studied singing, piano and guitar. Active on stage, in films and on television, she taught acting in various institutions, including the Centre universitaire in Nancy. Cassola was also a voice actress and has won a Nastro d'Argento for Best Dubbing for the dubbing of Tilda Swinton in Orlando. She was also a composer of Incidental music for stage works.

== Selected filmography ==
- Death Rides a Horse (1967)
- The Howl (1970)
- The House of Clocks (1989)
- Demonia (1990)
- Captain America (1990)
- The Devil's Daughter (1991)
- Where Are You? I'm Here (1993)
- Once a Year, Every Year (1994)
- The Butterfly's Dream (1994)
- Giovani e belli (1996)
