= Kill Johnny Ringo =

1966 film

- Directed by: Gianfranco Baldanello
- Cinematography: Marcello Masciocchi
- Edited by: Bruno Mattei
- Music by: Pippo Caruso
- Release date: 1966
- Country: Italy
- Language: Italian

Uccidete Johnny Ringo, internationally released as Kill Johnny Ringo, is a 1966 Italian western film directed by Gianfranco Baldanello. It is the film debut in the Spaghetti Western genre for Brett Halsey.

== Cast ==
- Brett Halsey: Johnny Ringo
- Greta Polyn: Annie
- Guido Lollobrigida: Sheriff Parker / Lee Mellin (credited as Lee Burton)
- Nino Fuscagni: Ray Scott
- Angelo Dessy: Jackson
- Barbara Loy: Christine Scott
- Guglielmo Spoletini: José (credited as William Bogart)
- Attilio Dottesio

== Plot ==
Johnny Ringo is a Texas Ranger out to stop a counterfeiting ring. However, a large part of the story (and of the efforts of the hero) instead involves a triangle drama between big boss Jackson, the rancher Ray Scott, saloon singer Annie – mistress to the former and lover of the latter – and by way of Ray also his sister Christine. The connection of this to the mission of the hero is that Ray may be convinced to testify against Jackson. The real counterfeit artist turns out to be the sheriff - Ringo's partner to the investigation.

== Reception ==
In his investigation of narrative structures in Spaghetti Western films, Fridlund takes Uccidete Johnny Ringo as one example of how stories where the hero is an organizational man on a mission are fleshed out with emotionally invested side-stories, mysteries to be solved and/or unstable partnerships.
