= Star De Azlan =

American country music singer

- Origin: United States
- Genres: Country
- Occupation: Singer
- Years active: 2007-present
- Labels: Curb

Star De Azlan is an American country music singer. Signed to Curb Records in 2007, she released her debut single "She's Pretty" in early 2008; the song peaked at No. 51 on the Billboard Hot Country Songs charts.

De Azlan's parents owned a family restaurant in San Marcos, Texas, where her father would sometimes feature mariachi music. After performing at Fiesta San Antonio when she was 12, she returned often to perform in the city's Market Square area. While attending San Marcos High School (Texas), she was in the school's mariachi band and performing regularly at Cheatham Street, a local live music venue, as well. While performing at Cheatham Street, she was asked to audition for Curb Records after label head, Mike Curb heard her perform.

De Azlan released her debut single under Curb Records titled "She's Pretty" in 2007. On the chart week ending January 14, 2008, "She's Pretty" debuted at number 52 on the U.S. Billboard Hot Country Songs chart; it reached a peak of number 51 in its second week and spent eight weeks on the chart. It was followed in 2009 by her second single, "Like a Rose," which failed to chart. A third single, "A Man Who Can Dance," was released in 2011, and also failed to chart before de Azlan and Curb eventually parted ways.

== Discography ==
=== Extended plays ===
Title	Album details
Like a Rose	Release date: April 28, 2009; Label: Curb Records

=== Singles ===
Year	Single	Peak positions	Album
Year	Single	US Country	Album
2008	"She's Pretty"	51	Like a Rose
2009	"Like a Rose"	—	Like a Rose
2011	"A Man Who Can Dance"	—	—
"—" denotes releases that did not chart

=== Music Videos ===
Year	Title	Director
2008	"She's Pretty"	Marc Ball
