= Camille Bright-Smith =

American singer-songwriter

Camille Brightsmith
- Birth name: Camille Smith
- Genres: Country, country pop
- Occupation: Singer-songwriter
- Instrument(s): Vocals, guitar, piano
- Labels: TDRS Music
- Website: http://bloginsong.com

Camille Bright-Smith is an American singer-songwriter from Long Beach, California.

== Life and work ==
Camille Brightsmith studied music in Long Beach, but departed shortly before her finals after arguing with professors about her music, and opinions. She shifted from classical music to rock and joined local projects like Gush and The Bright Projects as a singer, keyboardist and guitarist.

She is citing Patti Smith, PJ Harvey, Radiohead, Joni Mitchell, Tori Amos and Air as influences.

In 2008 she released her solo album The Great Divide recorded by Travis Dickerson. John Bright, Travis himself and his brother Lindy, Thanatopsis drummer Ramy Antoun, Tony Brock (The Babys) and Dustin Boyer (guitarist for Jennifer Love Hewitt and John Cale) also worked on the album.

She is a member of the National Organization for Women and headed a department in Long Beach.

Camille has two children (twins) born in 2006.

== Discography ==
- GUSH (1997)
- The Great Divide (2008)
- Rent (2010)
