= Vicki Vann =

American singer-songwriter

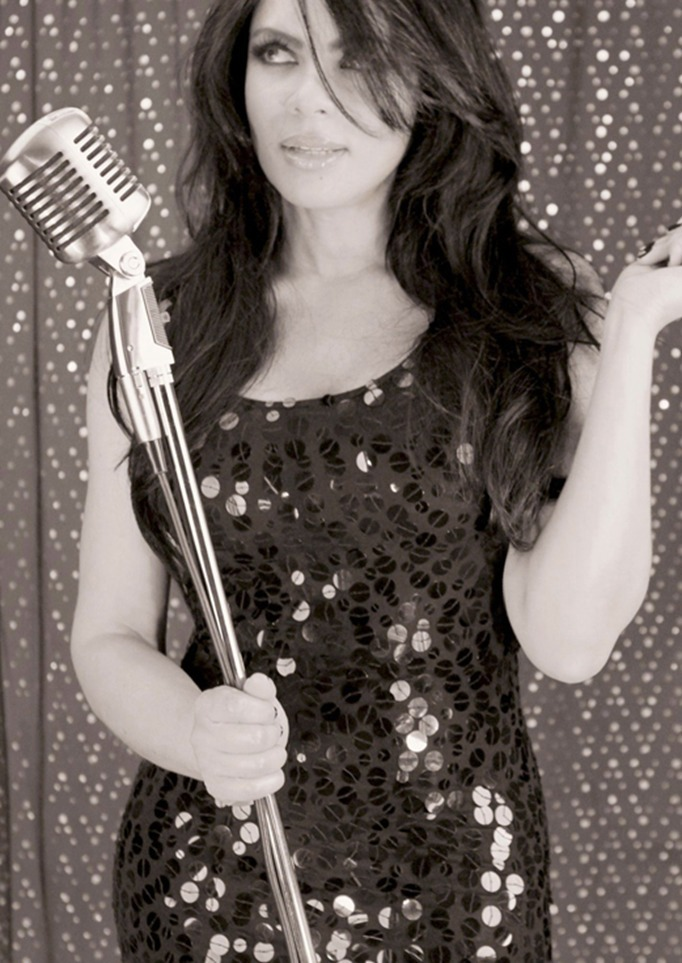
- Vicki Vann performing in Los Angeles, CA. (June 2011)

Background information
- Born: Victoria Araceli Denise Vann Bradford Turnbough; July 14, 1963 (age 62)
- Origin: Los Angeles, California US
- Genres: Country, Country Soul, Southern soul
- Occupations: Singer, songwriter, record producer, model, dancer, editor-in-chief, businesswoman, philanthropist
- Website: www.vickivann.com

Victoria "Vicki" Araceli Denise Vann Bradford Turnbough (née Turnbough, born July 14, 1963) is an American country music artist, entrepreneur, and businesswoman. She has been called the Cinderella of country music and was chosen to appear as a featured artist in a Country Music Television documentary called "Waiting in the Wings." The documentary focuses on the ongoing struggles of the African American music artists in the country music industry.

== Early years ==
Victoria Vann was born in Los Angeles, California. Her father was born in Mississippi and was one of the original founding members of the Grammy Award Winning Gospel Group, Mighty Clouds of Joy. Her mother, whose family is of European descent, worked as a model for print ads and television, and later as a bookkeeper for a company that manufactured high-quality drafting instruments, drafting machines and drafting scales for students, the graphic artists industry, and professionals such as civil engineers. As a young girl Vicki was exposed to various types of music including gospel, jazz, and country, however her love for country music grew very strong and grew to be her preferred style. Among her musical influences are Sarah Vaughan, Nancy Wilson, Aretha Franklin, Elvis Presley, Amy Grant, Crystal Gayle, Dolly Parton, Diana Ross, Donny Hathaway, Barbra Streisand, Karen Carpenter, Linda Ronstadt, Marie Osmond, Reba McEntire, Joni Mitchell, Patsy Cline, and Loretta Lynn. But perhaps her greatest musical influence of all was her very own dad, despite the fact that her father, a Baptist minister, was a member of the world-famous gospel group, Mighty Clouds of Joy. Recognizing his daughter's talent, Vicki's dad wanted her to become the next Aretha Franklin, but the talented beauty had other plans. While attending in high school she was named Homecoming Princess and voted most shy among her high school classmates. Vann later attended Occidental College where she earned a degree in psychology, and graduate school soon followed where she earned a master's degree in education from Azusa Pacific University. While at college she discovered her love of acting. It helped her cope with her overwhelming shyness she suffered throughout her childhood and teenage years. Following graduation Vicki decided to become a kindergarten teacher while she worked at perfecting her craft. While teaching school by day, Vicki was gigging with her band at night and on weekends all around Southern California at street fairs, festivals, and speedways in addition to going on multiple auditions. She performed in Nashville on her first trip to Tennessee and set up a booth at Fan Fair, currently CMA Music Festival. She gathered up some players and traveled to Zürich, Switzerland to play the 38 Days of Country Music Festival there alongside Pam Tillis and Neal McCoy. After such a hectic performing schedule for about four years, Vicki said 'Goodbye' to her kindergarten students and decided to pursue her singing career full-time. Vicki Vann had decided to focus on singing and pursue a professional career in country music.

== Music career ==
Vicki Vann released her first solo CD Miracle in 1999.

In 2002, she released her second CD, the self-titled Vicki Vann, and followed that up by traveling to Europe to perform a prominent show in Switzerland, called "The Only 39 Day Country Festival in the World", at the Schützenhaus Albisgütli in Zurich, Switzerland. Since 2002, the popular music festival has been renamed, and is now known as "The Internationales Country Music Festival".

Her CD titled Dream Catcher exclusively distributed in Europe was released to popular acclaim and her single This Is Where I Get Off moved up the charts in 30 countries. Vicki Vann is one of the most requested female artists on the international country music scene. Vicki's CD Dream Catcher was one of 2005's hottest country music releases. During an interview she was asked what it was like to have CMT's (Country Music Television) cameras following her around when she appeared in the documentary Waiting in the Wings. "I was tickled pink! I wanted them to follow me everywhere! I thought, how cool is this to have cameras shooting me as I go about my day, having coffee, talking to my doggie, puttin' my make up on, getting ready for a gig, etc. It was all very surreal. I told myself to remember that feeling because that doesn't come along too often in one's lifetime. I savored it for every moment." In a collection of African American contributions to country music listening to these compilations becomes a game of rethinking what country music is. Can you hear the country in Ruth Brown's rhythm and blues version of the country standard "Tennessee Waltz"? Can you hear a Merle Haggard type twang in the voice of Stoney Edwards on "Honky Tonk Heaven"? Or conversely, can you hear the "soul," (which is to say "blackness") in the honky-tonk piano and pedal steel of Vicki Vann's "You Must Think My Heart Has Swinging Doors"? Country Music Hall of Fame and Museum member Charley Pride speaks candidly about launching his career during the civil rights movement of the 1960s during an interview for the new CMT documentary, Waiting in the Wings: African-Americans in Country Music. While the 90-minute program highlights more than a century of contributions to country music by African-Americans, it also questions why few have become successful country artists. Looking to the future, Waiting in the Wings showcases five young African-American artists, of which include vocalist Vicki Vann.

In 2011 Vann released her full studio album recorded in Nashville, Tennessee consisting of 13 complete tracks titled Reckless Heart, with its musical direction representing Vann's homage to the sweet soul classic country sounds of the early to mid 1960s and '70s.

== Editorial career ==
=== BIN Magazine ===
Vann joined Beverage Industry News Magazine, BIN, as an editor in 2000. She worked as a journalist, and coordinator of editorial material, as well as a host for video projects and short films representing products featured in the magazine while assisting Beverage Media Group, BMG, in New York City, which consists of 35 beverage publications across the United States, all servicing the United States beverage, beer, wine and spirits industry, before being appointed to Editor-in-Chief of BIN Magazine in 2005.

== Other Endeavors ==
=== Araceli Spirits ===
In 2015, she founded the spirits brand Araceli Spirits.

== Personal life ==
Vann is a Christian and believes that her faith in God is her lifeline. She says her faith in Jesus Christ and her music are always with her. She has said, "My faith in God means everything to me. Music is also a very essential part of who I am. Music gives life, music heals, and music saves souls. It is through the universal language of music that gives us all faith, hope, and love for one another." Victoria speaks in her native language of English along with Spanish, French, a little Portuguese, and German. She is interested in world history and culture, and she frequently studies the history, culture and languages of the countries she visits. She often goes by her Spanish name, Araceli, (Spanish pronunciation: [aɾaˈseli]}, which in Spanish, the meaning of the name Araceli is: Altar of Heaven.

== Discography ==
Albums

- 1999: Miracle
- 2002 Vicki Vann
- 2005 Dream Catcher
- 2008 Merry Christmas With Love
- 2011 Reckless Heart
