= Luanne Hunt =

American singer-songwriter

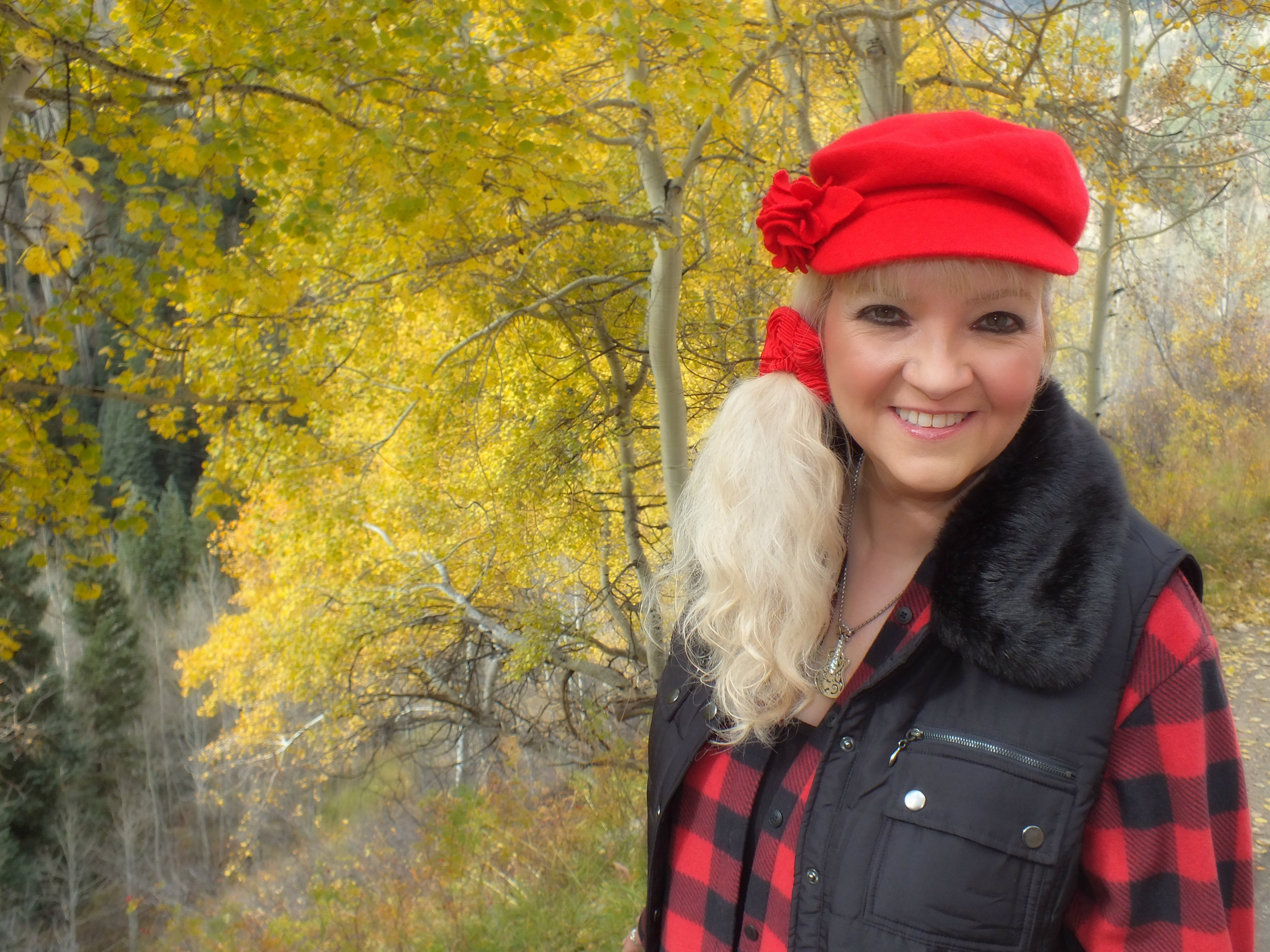

Background information
- Origin: Pennsylvania, United States
- Genres: Country; American Folk; Bluegrass; Gospel
- Instruments: Vocals / Guitar
- Years active: 1995–present
- Label: Star Creek Entertainment
- Website: www.luannehunt.com

Luanne Hunt is a country music and American folk music singer-songwriter.

== Career ==
Hunt first gained public recognition as a recording artist in 1995, when her songs began to get air play on KIK FM Radio in Minnesota. In 1996, she performed at the Starfest Country Music Festival at the Los Angeles County Fairgrounds in Pomona, California, and soon after was featured at Starfest alongside other artists.

From the late 1990s to the early 2000s, Hunt began collaborating with songwriter Lawton Jiles. Hunt and Jiles frequently performed together at concert venues throughout Southern California and worked closely together on various studio-recording projects. During this time she also performed live on several occasions with American R&B singer and songwriter Nolan Porter. Further collaborations with Porter include co-writing songs for Hunt's original musical, "Dove Lessons," which was staged in Claremont, California, in 1997 and raised over $10,000 for the House of Ruth domestic violence shelter.

In 2003, Hunt relocated from Ontario, California, to Hesperia, California, where she teamed up with country/folk producer Eric Uglum and began recording a series of albums. In 2009, Hunt's song "The Sun’s Coming Up Over Memphis" reached No. 10 on Nashville’s New Music Weekly country chart. "Solace in the Wind" went on to receive worldwide airplay on several terrestrial and Internet radio stations. In 2010, the track reached No. 1 on the European Country Music Association’s chart (Belgium). The same year, it reached No. 37 on the Indie World Country Chart.

Hunt’s single “Christmas without You” (from her 2008 album “How Christmas Feels to Me”), written by Lawton Jiles and Buster Beam, is a song that was originally commissioned by Patsy Cline in 1960. In 2008, Jiles asked Hunt to re-record the track, and in 2010 it reached No. 15 on Europe's Hotdisc chart. In December 2011, the track topped European Country Music Association’s chart in France, Denmark, and Belgium. The same month it became the second most played song on UK country music radio.

The same year, her track “Bluer Than the Bluegrass” reached No. 5 on Hotdisc's country music chart. The song also reached No. 17 on the Nashville-based Indie World Chart and in August 2015 was declared one of the chart's fastest-rising singles of the month. Her tracks “Pine and the Dogwood,” “He Was There” and “There is a Fountain (Filled with Blood)” all reached No. 1 on Europe's Hotdisc Christian chart.

== Awards ==
- American Songwriting Award nominee in the Best Holiday Song 2014 category for “If Christmas Were Mine.”
- American Songwriting Award nominee in the Best Holiday Song 2015 category for “The Hosts of Christmas Past.”

== Discography ==
- “Mood Swings” (1996, Star Creek)
- “Lost in Your Love” (2001, Star Creek)
- “I’m So Happy” (2002, Star Creek)
- “Moving God, Moving Mountains” (2003, Star Creek)
- “Chapters and Verse” (2004, Star Creek)
- “He Was There” (2006, Star Creek)
- “Breaking Through” (2007, Star Creek)
- “How Christmas Feels to Me” (2008, Star Creek)
- “The Singles Sessions” (2009, Star Creek)
- “Most Requested” (2012, Star Creek)
- “Songs from the Valley” (2014, Star Creek)
- “The Greatest Christmas Gift” (2015, Star Creek)
- “Portraits in Song” (2022, Star Creek)
