= Renate Hoy =

German actress (1930–2024)

- Born: Renate Anita Huy; 31 December 1930; Ludwigshafen, Bavaria, Germany
- Died: 1 July 2024 (aged 93)
- Other names: Erika Nordin
- Years active: 1952–1959
- Spouse(s): Brett Halsey (1954–1959) (two children); Raymond C. Simpson (1963–1975) (1 son) ? (?–1980)
- Children: Charles Oliver, Jr. (b. 1956); Tracy Leigh (b. 1957); Richard James (b. 1967)

Renate Hoy (born Renate Anita Huy; 31 December 1930 – 1 July 2024), also credited as Erika Nordin, was a German actress and beauty pageant titleholder.

== Career ==
After winning the title of Miss Nürnberg, she was crowned Miss Germany of 1952. She then travelled to the United States to represent her country in the first Miss Universe contest, which was held in Long Beach, California where she placed fifth (fourth runner up).

Shortly thereafter, she became a contract player for Universal Studios and made several movies during the 1950s. She was in such films as Abbott and Costello Go to Mars, Missile to the Moon, The Golden Blade, The Birds and the Bees, The Sea Chase, A Certain Smile, and had a leading role in the classic German film Schloß Hubertus.

== Personal life ==
In 1954, Hoy married actor Brett Halsey. They had two children, son Charles Oliver Hand, Jr. (a.k.a. "Rock Bottom" of the Los Angeles-based punk band Rock Bottom and the Spys) and daughter Tracy Leigh. They divorced in 1959. Charles Hand was murdered in prison while serving a 25-year sentence.

Following a landmark 1960 Screen Actors Guild strike, Hoy retired from acting. In 1963, Hoy married prominent civil rights attorney Raymond C. Simpson. The couple had one child, musician Richard James Simpson, a member of the bands Invisiblechains and Teardrain.

Hoy died on 1 July 2024, at the age of 93.
