= Eric Uglum =

American singer-songwriter

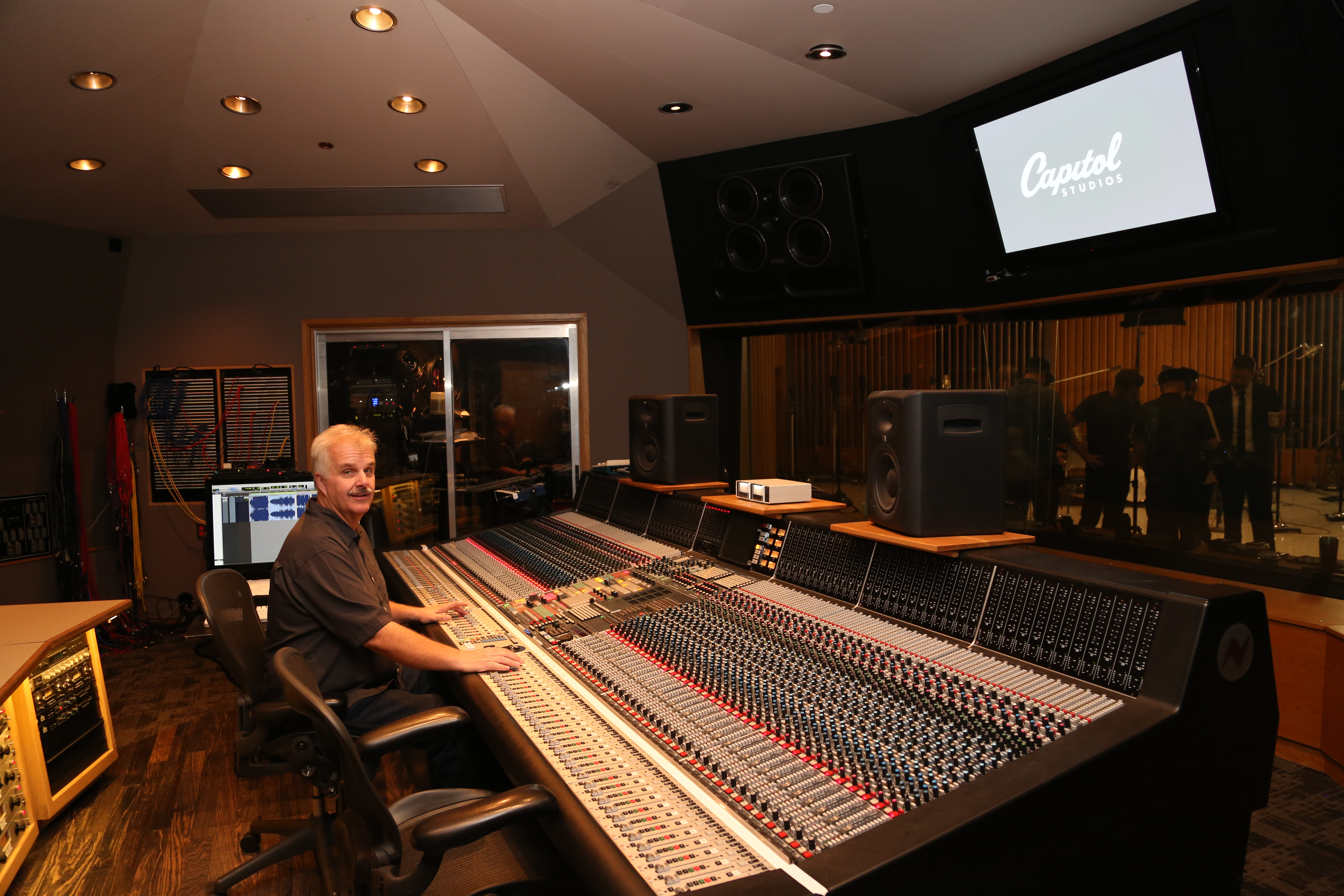
- Uglum at Capitol Records Studio A in Los Angeles

Background information
- Born: Eric Alfred Benjamin Lussky; November 22, 1961 (age 64); Fort Campbell, Kentucky, United States
- Origin: Fort Campbell, Kentucky, and Huntington Beach, California, United States
- Genres: Bluegrass music, folk music, country music
- Occupations: Musician, record producer, audio engineer, mastering engineer, mixing engineer
- Instruments: Guitar, mandolin, bass
- Years active: 1982–present
- Labels: Backcountry Records, Hay Holler Records
- Formerly of: Weary Hearts, New Wine, Copperline, Chris Stuart & Backcountry, Uglum & Sons, Lost Highway
- Website: ericuglum.com

Eric Uglum (born November 22, 1961) is an American musician, vocalist, audio engineer and producer. He has had a very productive career in roots music performance and production and has toured worldwide in the bluegrass and folk music genres as a solo artist and as a member of many bands. Uglum has been featured in Flatpicking Guitar Magazine, Bluegrass Today, Bluegrass Unlimited and Bluegrass Now magazine. He is owner-operator of New Wine Sound Studio and Mastering Lab in Watertown, Tennessee and has worked with many Grammy nominated artists including: Ralph Stanley, Alison Krauss, Sean Watkins, Sara Watkins, Darrell Scott, Stuart Duncan, Ron Block, Rob Ickes, Neal Casal, Sierra Hull, The Black Market Trust and Gonzalo Bergara. In 2016 Eric and Bud Bierhaus were included on the Grammy Ballot for Best Bluegrass Album for their CD release entitled, Traveled. In addition to working independently through his New Wine Sound Studio and Mastering Lab, Uglum is also a staff engineer at Blue Night Records.

== Biography ==
Uglum was born November 22, 1961, as Eric Alfred Benjamin Lussky in Fort Campbell, Kentucky, United States, and was raised in Huntington Beach, California.

=== 1982–1990 ===
Uglum began his music career in Huntington Beach, California where he received his first guitar—a Guild D25M—at age 13. In 1982 he won the title of West Coast Flatpicking Guitar Champion.

In 1986 Uglum (guitar/lead vocal), Ron Block (guitar/vocals), and Mike Bub (bass) formed the band Weary Hearts. The band was later joined by Butch Baldassari (mandolin) and Chris Jones (guitar). In 1987 Weary Hearts released an album of traditional Gospel songs entitled "Faith is the Answer".

In 1988, after touring with Weary Hearts for two years, Uglum formed another band, New Wine. The lineup consisted of Eric Uglum (guitar/vocals), Ron Block (guitar/banjo/vocals), Sandra Block (bass/vocals) and Rob Ickes (dobro).

=== 1991–1999 ===
After Ron Block left Weary Hearts to pursue his career with Alison Krauss and Union Station, Uglum teamed up with Janet Beazley (banjo), Marshall Andrews (bass), and Bud Bierhaus (guitar) to form Copperline. They released an album entitled "Long, Long Way" and performed at the International Bluegrass Music Association conference in 1996.

In 1997, Uglum (guitar/mandolin/vocals) joined the traditional Southern California Bluegrass band, Lost Highway. The band featured Ken Orrick (guitar/vocals), Dick Brown (banjo), Marshall Andrews (bass) and Paul Shelasky (fiddle). The band toured extensively around the U.S., the United Kingdom, Canada, Europe and the Middle East. In 2000 Lost Highway released "Lifetime of Sorrow" an album featuring Ralph Stanley on guest tenor vocal.

=== 2000–present ===
Uglum released his first solo album, "Shenandoah Wind", in January 2004. The album features guests such as Alison Krauss (singing harmony), Ron Block, Rob Ickes and Stuart Duncan.

In 2006, Uglum joined three bands in a tour which brought traditional American bluegrass music to The Sultanate of Oman. The bands, all from Southern California, were Lost Highway, Chris Stuart & Backcountry, and Eric Uglum & Sons. While in Oman, the bands performed at the Muscat Festival, a cultural event sponsored by the king celebrating the Omani populace. The tour also included concerts and workshops for schools, and performances for the American Embassy staff and private interests.

In 2007 Uglum (guitar) joined Chris Stuart (guitar/ lead vocals), Janet Beazley (banjo) and his stepsons Austin Ward (upright bass) and Christian Ward (fiddle) in the band, Chris Stuart & Backcountry. The band has released three albums to date entitled "Mojave River", "Crooked Man" and "Saints and Strangers".

Also in 2007, Uglum began performing in a trio with his stepsons Austin Ward (bass) and Christian Ward (fiddle). The trio toured nationally and released an album produced by Janet Beazley entitled, "The Old Road to Jerusalem".

== New Wine Sound Studio and Mastering Lab ==
In 1994, he began engineering and producing out of his New Wine Sound Studio and Mastering Lab then in Southern California. Clients have included The Black Market Trust, Sierra Hull, Sean Watkins and many more.

Uglum continues to operate New Wine Sound Studio now located in Watertown, Tennessee.

== Partial discography ==
=== Solo albums ===
- 2004: Shenandoah Wind – Primary Artist: Guitar, Mandolin, Vocals, Harmony Vocals, Engineering, Mixing, Mastering

=== Other credits and contributions ===
- 2015: Debby Clinkenbeard – Waiting on the Wind Featuring Neal Casal – Mixing, Mastering, Engineer, Lead/Rhythm Guitar
- 2013: Ron Block – The Walking Song – Mixing
- 2012: Gonzalo Bergara Quartet – Walking Home – Mixing, Engineer
- 2012: Gonzalo Bergara Quartet – Simplicated – Mixing, Engineer
- 2009: Cathy-Anne McClintock – Cathy-Anne McClintock – Engineer, Guitar (Acoustic), Mixing, Mastering
- 2009: Lee Watson and The Panthers – "Northern Track" – Mastering, Post Production
- 2009: The Breakmen —When You Leave Town – Mastering
- 2008: Sierra Hull – Secrets – Mixing, Mastering
- 2008: Lost Highway – A Bluegrass Gospel Collection – Guitar, Mandolin, Mastering, Tenor (Vocal), Vocals
- 2008: Various – The Bluegrass Tribute to Jack Johnson – Engineer, Guitar, Mandolin, Mixing
- 2007: Eric Uglum & Sons – The Old Road to Jerusalem (2007) – Guitar, Mandolin, Vocals, Harmony Vocals, Engineering, Mixing, Mastering
- 2007: Cliff Wagner – My Native Mind – Guitar, Tenor (Vocal)
- 2007: Ron Block – DoorWay – Engineer, Production Assistant
- 2007: Greg Spatz – Fiddler's Dream – Mastering
- 2007: Sally Jones – Songs About US – Engineer, Guitar, Mixing, Producer, Vocal Harmony
- 2005: Lost Highway – A Bluegrass Gospel Collection – Guitar, Mandolin, Mixing, Tenor (Vocal)
- 2003: Chris Stuart – Saints and Strangers – Mastering, Mixing
- 2002: Chris Stuart – Angels of Mineral Springs – Guitar (Acoustic), Guitar (Electric), Mandolin, Vocal Harmony
- 2002 Highway 52 - Silver Quarter
- 2002: Ken Orrick – Pictures and Stories – Engineer, Guitar, Mandolin, Mastering, Mixing, Producer, Tenor (Vocal)
- 2001: Ron Spears —Grandpa Loved the Carolina Mountains – Engineer, Mixing
- 2001: Ron Block – Faraway Land – Engineer, Production Assistant
- 2001: Sean Watkins— Let It Fall – Engineer, Mixing
- 2000: Lost Highway – A Lifetime of Sorrow – Engineer, Guitar, Mandolin, Mixing, Tenor (Vocal)
- 2000: Lost Highway – Headin' Down That Lost Highway – Engineer, Mixing, Producer, Vocals
- 2000: Kevin Buchanan —Silvertown – Mastering
- 1990: Butch Baldassari —Old Town – Guitar (Rhythm)
- 1990: Don and the Roping Dummies —Don and the Roping Dummies – Engineer
- 1990: Joe Reese — Fashioned Too Fragile – Engineer
- 1990: Many Voices, One Heart – More Than This - Engineer, Mixing, Mastering
- 1990: Scott Arthur —Road Less Traveled – Engineer, Guitar, Mandolin, Mastering, Mixing, Producer
- 1990: The Restless Hillfillies – Mastering
- 1990: Walden Dahl – Walden Dahl – Mastering
