= Demonia (film) =

1989 film directed by Lucio Fulci

- Directed by: Lucio Fulci
- Screenplay by: Lucio Fulci; Piero Regnoli
- Story by: Lucio Fulci; Piero Regnoli; Anontio Tentori
- Produced by: Ettore Spagnuolo
- Starring: Brett Halsey; Meg Register; Lino Salemme; Christina Englehardt
- Cinematography: Luigi Ciccarese
- Edited by: Otello Colangeli
- Music by: Giovanni Cristiani
- Production companies: Lanterna Editrice; A.M. Trading International S.r.l.
- Country: Italy

Demonia is an Italian horror film co-written and directed by Lucio Fulci.

== Plot ==
In Sicily in 1486, a mob of villagers tortured and crucified five nuns, suspected of witchcraft, in a chamber beneath their convent.

At a seance in Toronto in 1990, Liza (Meg Register) has a vision of the crucified nuns and falls screaming onto the floor. Several months later. Liza and Professor Evans (Brett Halsey), a respected archaeologist and her former professor, lead a survey team to Ancient Greek ruins near the small town of Santa Rosalia, Sicily. The locals, including Porter (Al Cliver) and Turi (Lino Salemme), tell them to avoid a monastery's beautiful but ominous ruins that overlook the dig. Although Professor Evans reminds her that she should avoid any involvement with the supernatural after the seance in Toronto, Liza is fascinated by the morbid rumors about what happened in the monastery.

Ignoring Turi's angry rebuke, Liza enters the monastery crypt. Convinced that there is another chamber behind a wall, she uses a pick-axe to break into the cavern containing the charred remains of the five nuns. But when Liza tells Professor Evans what she has found, he angrily tells her to forget she saw anything.

Soon, supernatural murders begin to take place. Porter is killed on his boat by a harpoon gun-wielding spectral nun. Two archaeological team members, Sean (Grady Thomas Clarkson) and Kevin (Pascal Druant), are lured into the ruins by enticing female voices and then killed when they fall through a weak floorboard and land into a pit of metal spikes. Eventually, Inspector Carter (Lucio Fulci) from Interpol arrives to investigate the deaths.

Meanwhile, Liza pursues her investigation into the monastery. She meets with a strange-looking woman (Carla Cassola) who tells her about what happened at the ruins centuries ago. The nuns practiced witchcraft and held orgies there as well. Local youths wound be invited there for sex, then murdered as they reached orgasm. The nuns would drink their blood in a satanic frenzy. If any of the crazed nuns became pregnant, they would carry their unwanted babies to full term, then throw the newborns onto a fire. After Liza leaves, the old woman is clawed to death by her pet cats.

Professor Evans suspects Turi the butcher, who has openly threatened violence against the archaeologists. But that evening, Turi is killed in the freezer of his meat shop. Inspector Carter finds a piece of torn clothing clutched in Turi's right hand, which belonged to his killer. Now under suspicion himself for Turi's murder, Professor Evans decides to abandon the dig, but Liza, acting more and more strangely, refuses to leave.

The following day, the enraged townspeople attack the haunted ruins, and Professor Evans tries to get his team clear. But he realizes that Liza and Robby, the young son of two team members, are missing. A white-robed, faceless nun has kidnapped Robby. He manages to escape but sees his father ripped in two by a hidden trap outside the camp.

Professor Evans pursues Liza, who is dressed in a white robe and possessed by the spirits of the evil nuns, into the ruins. She stabs him in the stomach and then disappears like a ghost. The townspeople charge into the hidden chamber. Liza reappears, foaming at the mouth on one of the crosses. The mob sets her and all the skeletal remains of the nuns afire. The wounded Professor Evans staggers into the cavern, pushing the mob members out of his way, to see Liza materialize at the foot of the burning crosses, no longer possessed but dead.

== Cast ==
- Brett Halsey as Paul Evans
- Meg Register as Liza
- Lino Salemme as Turi De Simone
- Christina Englehardt as Susie
- Pascal Druant as Kevin
- Grady Thomas Clarkson as Sean
- Ettore Comi as John
- Carla Cassola as la medium
- Michael Aronin as Andy
- Al Cliver as Porter
- Francesco Cusimano as Robbie
- Lucio Fulci as Inspector Carter

== Production ==
Demonia was developed under the working title of Liza. It began shooting in December 1989 and was shot in Sciacca, Sicily.

Among the cast was Brett Halsey who had worked previously with Fulci in Touch of Death, which was shot in 1988. Grady T. Clarkson had various sporadic acting jobs in Italy in the late 1980s and auditioned for Fulci's daughter Camila. He called the production a "dreadful affair" saying he could not understand Fulci's English and was told he would play one of the brothers in the film and on receiving the script found no mention of brothers anywhere. Clarkson said that filming was halted initially as a local paper said they were filming a pornographic film which left them without permits and postponing production for about a week. Clarkson said that on set Fulci was disorganized and often screamed at everyone, saying "it's not necessarily an angry scream, often it's tinged with humour, but it gets very tiring after a short while."

== Release ==
Demonia was described by Troy Howarth, author Splintered Visions: Lucio Fulci and His Films, as Fulci's "would be" return to theatrical films. The film was ready for sale at the MIFED (Mercato internazionale del film e del documentario) Film Market in 1990 and was unable to secure sales. As of 2018, it never received an official theatrical or television release in Italy.

The film received a home video release in Japan, which was released on the grey market in Italy. Demonia was released by Playtime in Italy with a running time of 84 minutes and 40 seconds by late 1991. It did not receive an official release in the United States until Shriek Show released the film on DVD.

== Reception ==
Fulci would later describe the film as "a wonderful movie, ruined from very bad photography. And that's that." Howarth described it as "one of Fulci's weakest films, an incoherent mishmash of the ghost story and nunsploitation genres" and that had "only a few flashes of the director's distinctive style."

J. Doyle Wallis of DVD Talk said that the film was "every bit as cheap as it is predictable. Only worthwhile for die-hard Fulci completists who've bought all the releases of good Fulci films."
