= Pink Nasty =

American singer-songwriter

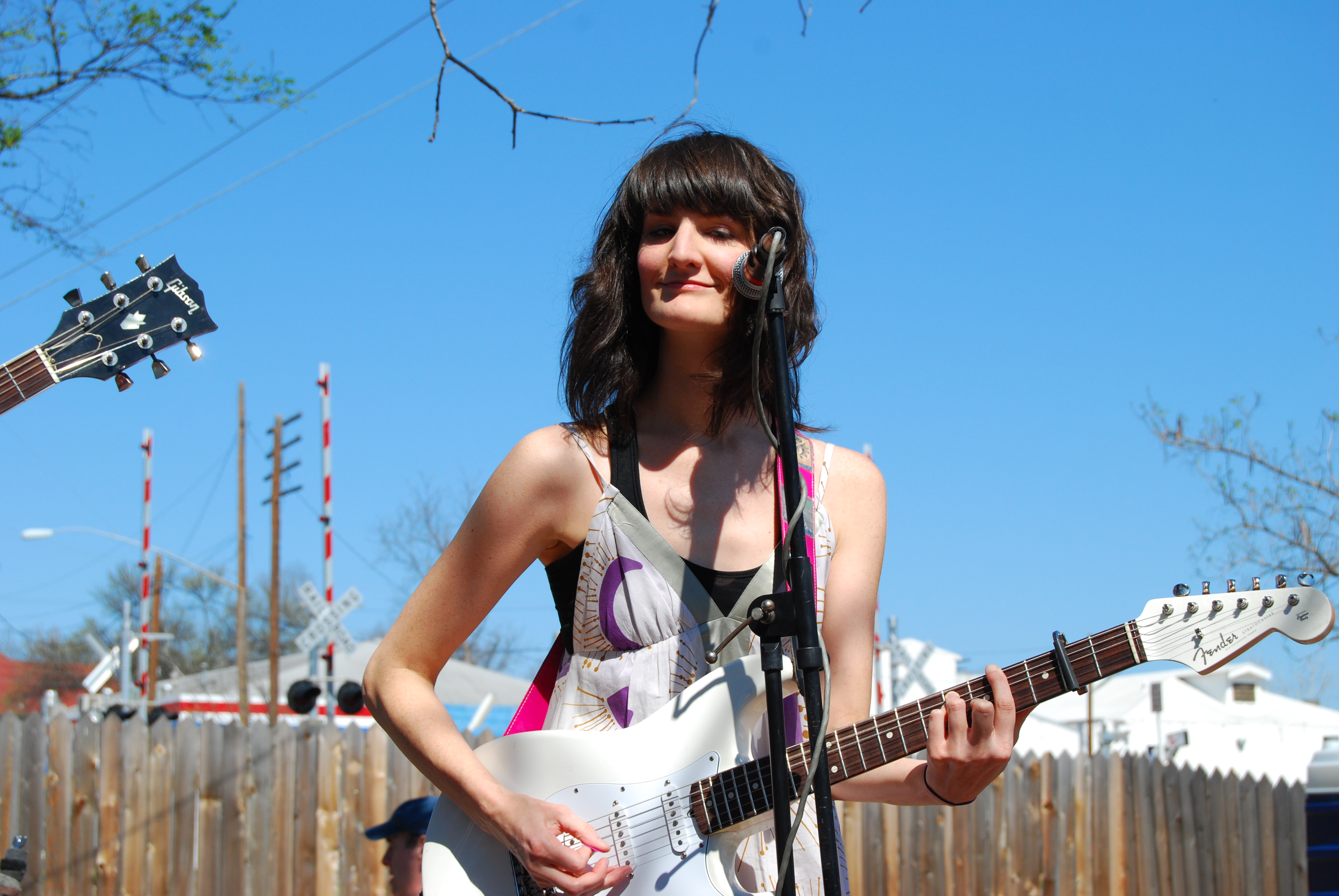
- Pink Nasty performing at SXSW in 2008

Background information
- Origin: Wichita, Kansas
- Genre: Alternative Country
- Years active: 2003-present

Sara Beck, better known by her stage name Pink Nasty, is an American singer-songwriter. She is from Wichita, Kansas and currently lives in Austin, Texas. Pink Nasty has released three full-length albums. She performs with her brother, a rapper who goes by the stage name Black Nasty.

Kathryn Yu of NPR described Pink Nasty as a "young and talented singer-songwriter whose quirky alt-country songs nicely complement her pretty but powerful voice". The song "Don't Ever Change" on her second album, Mold the Gold features Pink Nasty and Bonnie Prince Billy. She has opened for notable indie music acts Britt Daniel and José González.

Pink Nasty's third album, Pink Nasty was released in 2010. Reviews on the Oxford American and Austin 360 websites praise the album's blend of quirkiness and pop.

Beck studied at Berklee College of Music, and cites Weezer, Stephen Malkmus and The Strokes as influences.

== Discography ==
Year	Title
2003	Mule School
2006	Mold the Gold
2010	Pink Nasty
