= Aileeah Colgan =

American singer-songwriter

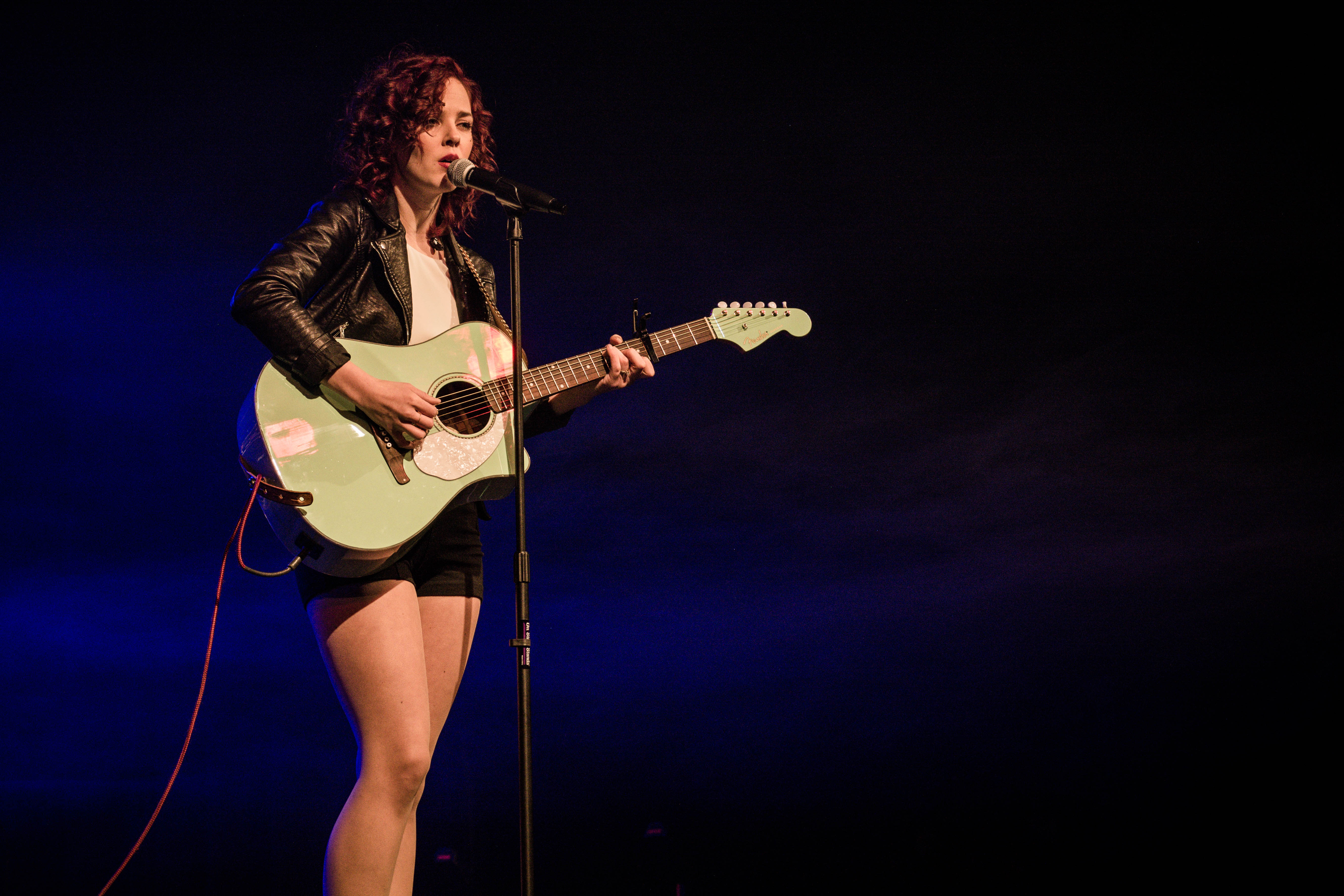
Aileeah Colgan

Aileeah Grace Colgan (born April 25, 1993) is an American country recording artist from Peoria, Illinois, United States. She is signed to Green Shoe Records, a subsidiary of Green Shoe Studio, which is owned by her brothers Jacob Colgan and Jon Colgan. She released her self-titled EP album at the Peoria, Illinois Apollo Theatre in May 2015. She is the 2015 Illinois State Country Showdown Winner. Aileeah has performed with Kane Brown, Rodney Atkins and Lee Greenwood. She's shared the stage with Scotty McCreery and RaeLynn at the 2016 Heartland Heroes American Red Cross event as well performing at the 2016 Common Ground Music Festival.
