= McKenna Faith =

American singer-songwriter (born 1995)

- Born: McKenna Garcia; 1995 (age 30–31)
- Origin: Ukiah, California, U.S.
- Genres: Country
- Occupation: Singer-songwriter
- Website: www.mckenna-faith.com

McKenna Garcia (born January 6, 1995), better known by her stage name McKenna Faith is a country music singer/songwriter from Ukiah, California.

== Career ==
On August 21, 2011 Faith opened the Sonoma Country Music BBQ in Santa Rosa, California, playing with Dierks Bentley, Thompson Square and Luke Bryan. On February 14, 2012, McKenna Faith debuted her single "Head Over My Boots For You" to radio. Faith performed on the Blake Shelton and Friends Cruise in 2013.

On June 11, 2013 Faith released her first full-length album, We Like Trucks. That September, Faith performed at the Sonoma Stampede Country Music Festival. She performed with Frankie Ballard and Tate Stevens.

== Discography ==
=== Albums ===
- We Like Trucks (2013)
- Let's Get Lost (2014)

=== EPs ===
- Seal It With A Kiss (2015)
