= Anna Craig =

American singer-songwriter

Anna Elizabeth Craig Holan (born June 2, 1993) is a country pop singer and songwriter from Hartselle, Alabama.

== Biography ==
Craig's parents are Angela (née Pugh) and Brent Craig. She has a younger sister, Emily.

Craig began getting noticed through YouTube. She posted her first video on August 1, 2008 of her singing Taylor Swift's “Picture to Burn.” Currently she has thousands of subscribers and well over 1.5 million views of her singing on YouTube.

She released her first EP of five original songs on August 2, 2010.

Craig is distantly related to the late country music icon Tammy Wynette, who was Craig's grandfather's second cousin. Craig's EP has had sales and received radio play in the U.S. and other countries.

Craig signed with Expat Records, who re-released her EP on April 11, 2011.

== Personal life ==
On January 23, 2016, Craig was married to Joshua Holan. In June 2017, Craig announced on her Instagram that she is pregnant. In December 2017, she gave birth to her first child, a daughter.

She currently living in Fort Bliss, Texas.
