= Kendal Conrad =

American singer-songwriter

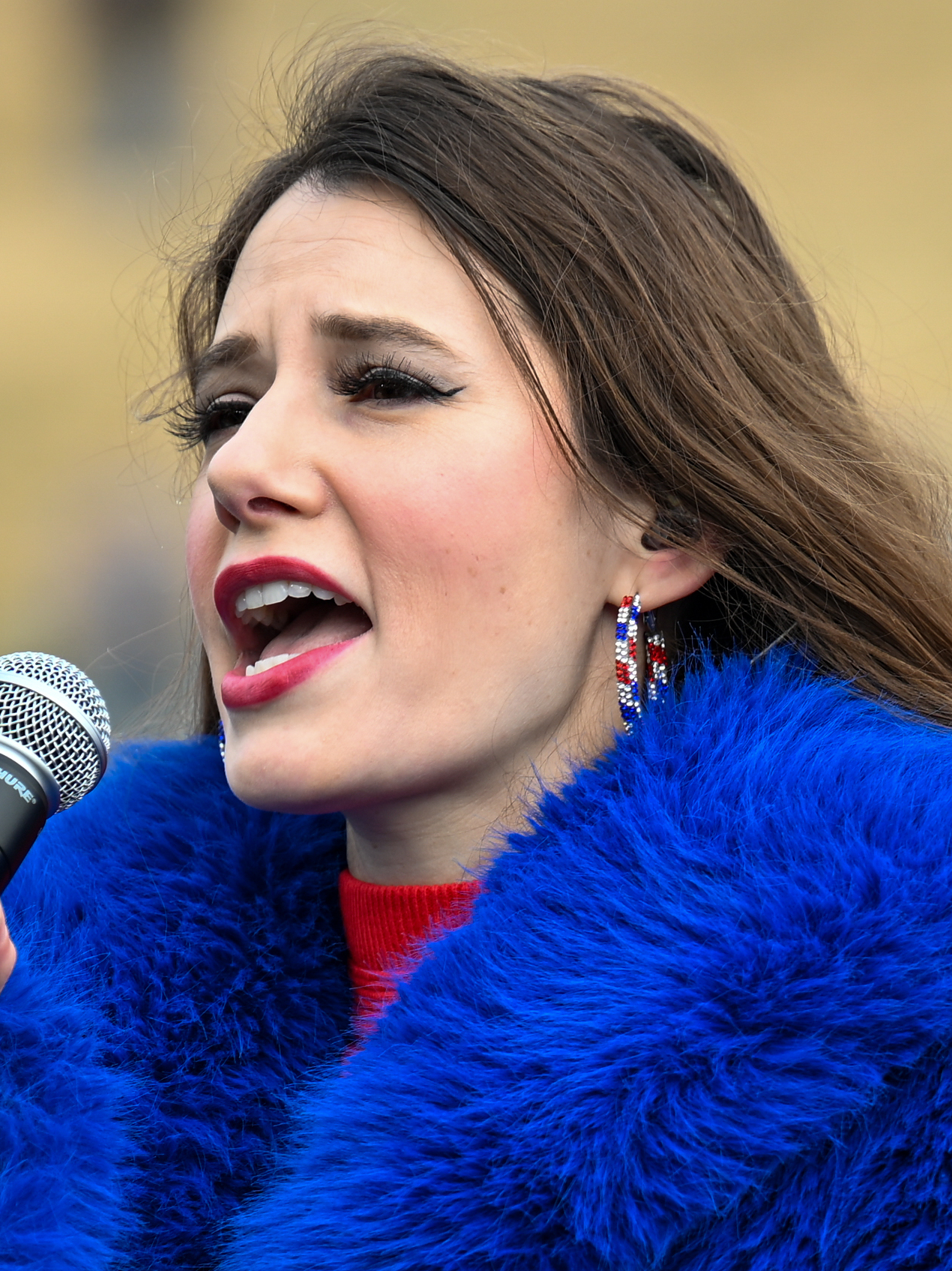
- Conrad at the 2025 Military Bowl

Background information
- Born: Kendal Conrad; Pottstown, Montgomery County, Pennsylvania
- Genres: Country
- Occupation: Singer-songwriter
- Years active: 2008–present
- Website: kendalconrad.com

Kendal Conrad (born September 4, 1991) is an American country music singer-songwriter.

== Career ==
Kendal Conrad appeared on MTV in June 2014. Later that year, she performed "We Were Us" with Keith Urban at Musikfest as part of his Raise 'Em Up Tour; this was subsequently named one of Urban's favorite tour moments.

Conrad is both a local winner and a state competitor in the 2015 Country Showdown, which is considered to be the largest country music talent competition in the United States. She was also a finalist in the NBC 10 Talent Search in 2010.

She has opened shows for artists including Phil Vassar, Craig Morgan, Easton Corbin, Rodney Atkins, Mo Pitney, Craig Campbell, Striking Matches, and Maggie Rose, and performed for Nicholas Sparks.

Conrad recorded her first EP at Reba McEntire’s Starstruck Studios in Nashville, Tennessee.

Conrad played the role of Holly Golightly in the exclusive post-Broadway production of Truman Capote’s Breakfast at Tiffany's at the Civic Theatre of Allentown, which opened on May 1, 2015. She received positive reviews for her performance.

Conrad has an endorsement deal with Corral Boots.
