= Patti Miner =

American singer and songwriter (born 1955)

- Also known as: Patti Miner
- Born: Pat Marie Gagon; December 12, 1955 (age 70)
- Origin: Orem, Utah, United States
- Genres: Country, pop
- Occupations: Singer, songwriter
- Labels: Platinum Plus Universal; BMG
- Member of: Patti Miner and The River Bottom Boys
- Formerly of: Peace and Happiness
- Website: Patti Miner Official Site

Pat Marie Gagon (born December 12, 1955), known as Patti Miner, is an American singer and songwriter, most notable for her gospel country style of music, and hit solo single "Outlaw Blues".

== Biography ==
=== Early life ===
Born in Utah to Marie and Fred Gagon, she was raised as a member of the Church of Jesus Christ of Latter-day Saints, along her three sisters: Utahna, Sharon, and Carol; and three brothers: Richard, Ira, and Fred Jr. She started singing in church aged six and performed in community plays and appeared on television. In her high school, Orem High, she performed in the live band Peace and Happiness.

=== Education and early career ===
She later attended Brigham Young University and got degrees in psychology, musical theater, and education. She taught Bonneville Elementary School's 2nd grade class in the first televised Open Class Room. After graduation, she taught at the junior college and started the Dance Team and Cheer Squads at Utah Technical Center, (currently Utah Valley University).

=== Mrs. Utah ===
Miner went on to enter the Mrs. America pageant and won Mrs. Utah 1984.

=== Music career ===
Miner signed with the BMG label in 1993 and recorded the albums; Deep and Wide, Outlaw Blues and Gospel Album of Inspirational Favorites. She has three country music videos seen on television CMT, TNN and the Branson Networks, PattiMiner.com Website, and YouTube: Outlaw Blues, Here Goes Nothing, and Going Home. Miner toured the United States with her band and was a pre-act for Dan Seals. She signed with Platinum Plus Universal in 2007 and recorded the Never Give Up album in 2008. She performs with her current band Patti Miner and The River Bottom Boys.

Miner is known for her positive, upbeat, country style and currently she teaches how to sing for upcoming and new singers.

=== Acting career ===
She was in the movie Christmas Mission directed by Michael Schaertl as well as Porter Rockwell and Choke Canyon by Paramount Pictures.

=== Personal life ===
She is married to husband M. Vinson Miner and has three daughters and a son. Her nephew, SGT Shane Fansler, is serving in Afghanistan with the elite 3rd Brigade, 10th Mountain Division.

== Discography ==
- Outlaw Blues
- Here Goes Nothing
- Going Home

== Filmography ==
- Christmas Mission

== Books ==
- Interviews for Pageant, Business and Social Situations
- Popularity and the Five Dimensions of Charm and Beauty
- Film and Stage Modeling
