= Fred Stobaugh =

- Born: August 22, 1917; Peoria, Illinois, U.S.
- Died: November 23, 2016 (aged 99); Peoria, Illinois, U.S.
- Known for: Writing Oh Sweet Lorraine
- Spouse: Lorraine Dinquel (m. 1940; died 2013)
- Children: 3 daughters

Fred Stobaugh (August 22, 1917 – November 23, 2016) was a retired truck driver from Peoria, Illinois who became a viral sensation as a songwriter. A documentary video about the making of the song Oh Sweet Lorraine, based on a text that Stobaugh wrote for his wife of 72 years, became a viral video in September 2013. The song based on his text subsequently entered the Billboard Hot 100 as well as other international charts.

== Life and work ==
Stobaugh first met his future wife Lorraine Dinquel in 1938. The couple married in 1940 and later had three daughters. His wife died on April 26, 2013, only two months before the couple's 73rd wedding anniversary.

A few months later he wrote the song Oh Sweet Lorraine and entered a singer-songwriter competition hosted by Green Shoe Studio. The video of their recording sessions attracted more than seven million hits on YouTube and Vimeo.

In September 2013 the song entered the Billboard Hot 100 at No. 42, making him the oldest artist to appear on the Hot 100. It also entered the Swiss Hitparade and the Ö3 Austria Top 40. On August 22, 2014, his 97th birthday, Stobaugh released a second song, Took Her Home. The next week, Green Shoe Studio posted several follow-up documentary videos on Fred's story and the public's response. He died in November 2016 at the age of 99.

== Discography ==
Title	Year	Peak chart positions			
Title	Year	US	BEL (Fl)	CH	AT
"Oh Sweet Lorraine"	2013	42	42	31	14
"Took Her Home"	2014				
