= Shifty Adventures in Nookie Wood =

Studio album by John Cale
- Released: 1 October 2012
- Recorded: 2011–12
- Studios: ARM Studios, Los Angeles, CA; Mondo Studio, Los Angeles, CA
- Genres: Art rock, art pop
- Length: 53:53
- Label: Double Six
- Producers: John Cale; Danger Mouse ("I Wanna Talk 2 U" only)

John Cale chronology
Extra Playful (EP) (2011)	Shifty Adventures in Nookie Wood (2012)	M:FANS (2016)

Singles from Shifty Adventures in Nookie Wood
- 1. "I Wanna Talk 2 U" Released: 6 July 2012; 2. "Face to the Sky" / "Living with You (Organic Mix)" Released: 29 August 2012

Shifty Adventures in Nookie Wood is the fifteenth solo studio album by the Welsh rock musician John Cale. It was released on 1 October 2012 in Europe and 2 October in North America on the Double Six Records imprint of Domino Records. It was released as digital download, heavyweight vinyl and CD. Most of the songs were recorded by John Cale in his own studio in Los Angeles. On one track he collaborated with Danger Mouse. In September 2011 Cale released the Extra Playful EP and its release promised that the new album would be released the following year. It is his first studio album since 2005's blackAcetate.

== Release ==
Shifty Adventures in Nookie Wood was released in three standard versions: on CD, on double vinyl LP and as digital download (mp3 320 kbit/s and wav 16-bit / 44.1). When pre-ordering the vinyl-edition, it came with one of three one-track mystery bonus 7" singles. "Bluetooth Swings Redux" (5:25), "Hatred" (3:58) or "Cry" (5:33).

=== Singles ===
First single from this album "I Wanna Talk 2 U" was released on 6 July 2012 as digital download. Second single "Face to the Sky" was released in August (on the B-side was "Living with You (Organic Mix)"). It was released both in digital format and vinyl SP).

== Critical reception ==
Professional ratings
Aggregate scores
Source	Rating
Metacritic	73/100
Review scores
Source	Rating
AllMusic	3/5 stars
The A.V. Club	B
The Guardian	4/5 stars
The Line of Best Fit	8/10
Mojo	4/5 stars
Pitchfork	6.0/10
PopMatters	8/10
Q	4/5 stars
Slant Magazine	4.5/5 stars
Uncut	8/10

Critical reception of the album has been mixed to positive. The Guardian newspaper called the album "it's an album that combines the 70-year-old's experience with the glee of a small child." Online magazine Slant Magazine called it "both provocative and strange."

=== Weekly charts ===
Chart (2012)	Peak position
Belgian Albums (Ultratop Flanders)	58
Belgian Albums (Ultratop Wallonia)	169
US Heatseekers Albums (Billboard)	44

== Track listing ==
All songs written and composed by John Cale except "I Wanna Talk 2 U" (words by John Cale, music by Cale and Brian Burton).

No.	Title	Length
1.	"I Wanna Talk 2 U" (feat. Danger Mouse)	3:32
2.	"Scotland Yard"	4:59
3.	"Hemingway"	3:58
4.	"Face to the Sky"	4:58
5.	"Nookie Wood"	4:05
6.	"December Rains"	4:41
7.	"Mary"	5:39
8.	"Vampire Cafe"	5:47
9.	"Mothra"	3:30
10.	"Living with You"	4:03
11.	"Midnight Feast"	5:00
12.	"Sandman (Flying Dutchman)"	3:44
Total length:		53:53

== Personnel ==
Musicians

- John Cale – vocals, keyboards, piano, organ, synths, electric and acoustic guitars, electric viola, bass guitar, percussion, drum machine, drum programming, noises
- Dustin Boyer – guitars, synths, noises, tambo, backing vocals
- Danger Mouse a.k.a. Brian Burton – bass, synth, drum programming on "I Wanna Talk 2 U"
- Michael Jerome Moore – drums, percussion, cajón
- Joey Maramba – bass
- Deantoni Parks − drums in "Bluetooth Swings Redux"
- Erik Sanko − bass in "Scotland Yard"
- Eden Cale − background vocals in "Hemingway"

Production

- John Cale – producer, arranger
- Dustin Boyer – recording
- Kennie Takahashi – recording on "I Wanna Talk 2 U"
- Todd Monfalcone – recording on "I Wanna Talk 2 U"
- Adam Moseley – mixing, programming
- Mickey Petralia – mixing
- Robin Lynn – programming
- Nita Scott – executive producer
- Andy Romanoff – photography
- Rob Carmichael, Seen – artwork & design
- Brian Burton a.k.a. Danger Mouse – producer on "I Wanna Talk 2 U"
- Recorded at: A.R.M. Studio, Los Angeles, CA and Mondo Studio, Los Angeles, CA
