= Zolar X =

American glam rock band

Background information
- Origin: California, U.S.
- Genres: Punk rock; glam rock; outsider; space rock; psychedelic rock; proto-punk
- Years active: 1973–1981; 2004–present
- Label: Alternative Tentacles
- Members: Ygarr Ygarrist; Zory Zenith; Romm Eclipse; Raidia Visual-X; Moto Bass Unit; Eon Flash; Ufoian Ufar; Zany Zatovian; Jett Starsystems; Qazar Quantor
- Website: zolarx.com

Zolar X is an American glam rock band founded in 1973. Zolar X became known in the Los Angeles club scene for dressing and acting like space-aliens. They spoke an 'alien language' of their own invention. They are referred to as "Los Angeles' first glam rock band" in the 1998 book Glam! Bowie, Bolan and the Glitter Rock Revolution by Barney Hoskyns.

Zolar X were the house band at Rodney's English Disco, which was depicted in George Hickenlooper's 2004 documentary Mayor Of The Sunset Strip. Zolar X played gigs with Shady Lady, Iggy Pop, Michael Des Barres, Jobriath Boone, and the New York Dolls.

== History ==
=== Coming to Earth: 1973–1975 ===
Zolar X enjoyed regional success as a live act, and national exposure via Lenny Kaye's Rock Scene Magazine, but commercial success eluded them. Zolar X were unable to get signed to a record label. In 1982 they released one independent record, Timeless, a collection of demos, on Pyramid Records.

Zolar X's founder was vocalist, composer, and pianist Stephen Della Bosca, who renamed himself "Ygarr Ygarrist" upon forming Zolar X. Ygarrist had previously played in San Francisco bands The Hedge and Bosca before moving to Los Angeles in 1972 with Bruce Courtois (Zany Zatovian). Ygarrist and Zatovian met singer Zory Zenith at Rodney's English Disco. Zenith was the former drummer for the Los Angeles rock band Shady Lady. Zenith not only sang in Zolar X, but performed intricate mime routines onstage. The lineup was completed by drummer Craig Rhinehart (Eon Flash), a former member of San Francisco hard rock band Legs Diamond.

Zolar X's week-long stint at the Troubadour with Jobriath was televised locally in Los Angeles. Zolar X were interviewed on one of the first episodes of Tom Snyder's The Tomorrow Show in 1974, along with Rodney Bingenheimer, Sable Starr and Chuck E. Starr.

In 1974, Zolar X recorded a two-song demo, "Space Age Love" b/w "Energize Me", at Crystal Studios. They pressed approximately ten 7" singles of these tracks, which were given to various record companies. Ygarrist's sister kept one of them, which in 2005 was used to press a limited edition 45 of this rare artifact.

=== 1976–1977 ===
Zatovian and Flash's departure in 1975 resulted in Ygarrist recruiting bass player Ufoian Ufar (Tom Lee) and drummer Romm Eclipse (Ron Eiseman). Zory left to pursue religious studies. Ygarr, Ufoian, and Romm briefly played and recorded as The Spacers. Zory soon rejoined and Zolar X recorded with producer and audio engineer Jim Dickenson at Memphis' Ardent Studios. Romm left, and Eon rejoined in 1977.

=== Downfall: 1978–1981 ===
While Zolar X were on hiatus, Ygarr formed another Los Angeles punk band, The Spys, with Rock Bottom. The two wrote a collection of new songs in one night, which they released as the single "Rich Girl" b/w "No Good, Deathtrap". Around this time, Ygarr began to spiral into excessive drug/alcohol abuse. Zolar X regrouped in 1979, but Zory Zenith was promptly fired for having an affair with their manager's girlfriend, and dancing on top of the manager's limousine. Zolar X recorded as a three piece, with Ygarr handling all the lead vocals. Zory was asked to rejoin, and in 1980, Zolar X recorded one last time at Army St. Studios in San Francisco.

=== Return: 2004–present ===
Longtime fan Jello Biafra released a deluxe edition of Timeless in late 2004. Zolar X reformed in 2005. Zolar X have been critically re-evaluated, with praise from the worldwide press. Zolar X articles appeared in the UK's rock magazine Mojo, plus Blender, Spin, and the New Yorker Magazine. Timeless and demos of newly recorded Zolar X material have received frequent airplay on Steve Jones of the Sex Pistols' radio show, Jonesy's Jukebox on Indie 103.1, as well as on Rodney Bingenheimer's KROQ-FM radio show.

The band reunited in 2005, and played for the first time since 1981. Zory Zenith was unable to participate because he received a 10-year sentence in Oregon for repeated instances of domestic violence. Ygarr and Eon Flash were joined by new bass player Jett Starsystems, previously knowns as Jeff Porter a.k.a. Jett Black, a former DJ at Rodney's English Disco and founding member of Voodoo Church. Zolar X still play with metallic amp casings, silver platforms and backdrops, antennae headgear, and ever-changing outfits faithful to the 1970s glam era.

Zolar X showcased at the South by Southwest Music Festival in March 2006. They were introduced by Jello Biafra, and Canadian TV personality Nardwuar. Shortly after SXSW, Zolar X appeared on Canadian TV channel MuchMusic, subject of a full-length feature, interviewed by Nardwuar. On April 30, 2006, at the Avalon in Hollywood, Zolar X received a "lifetime achievement award" at the first annual LARPY (live action role playing) AWARDS, for their dedication to role playing, both on-stage and off. Presenters included José Canseco and Deborah Gibson.

They toured nationally in the United States in 2005 and 2006. In June 2007, Zolar X self-released a limited edition [500 only] CD compilation entitled ZAP! You're Zolarized, which previewed four songs from the upcoming Alternative Tentacles release, contained unreleased vintage Zolar X music, and also soundtrack music from the upcoming Zolar X documentary. In October 2007, X Marks the Spot (CD/LP) was released. Zolar X were featured on a 2007 episode of The Next Great American Band reality show, in which judge Ian "Dicko" Dickson proceeded to insult them.

Zolar X is the subject of an unreleased documentary titled Starmen On Sunset. The film was directed by Chuck Nolan, and was produced/edited by Rhaine Della Bosca.

== Discography ==
- Timeless [clear vinyl LP] (1982) Pyramid Records
- Timeless [CD/LP] (2004) Alternative Tentacles - US CMJ #145
- "Space Age Love '74" / "Energize Me '74" [45] (2006) Deliar Spacer Core (500 only)
- ZAP! You're Zolarized! [CD] (2007) Deliar Spacer Core (500 only)
- X Marks The Spot (2007) [CD/LP] Alternative Tentacles
- Life Signs from the Stars (2012) [CD-R] Deliar Spacer Corporation (100 only)
- Urban Myths (2014) [CD-R] Deliar Spacer Corporation
