= Dustin Boyer =

American singer-songwriter

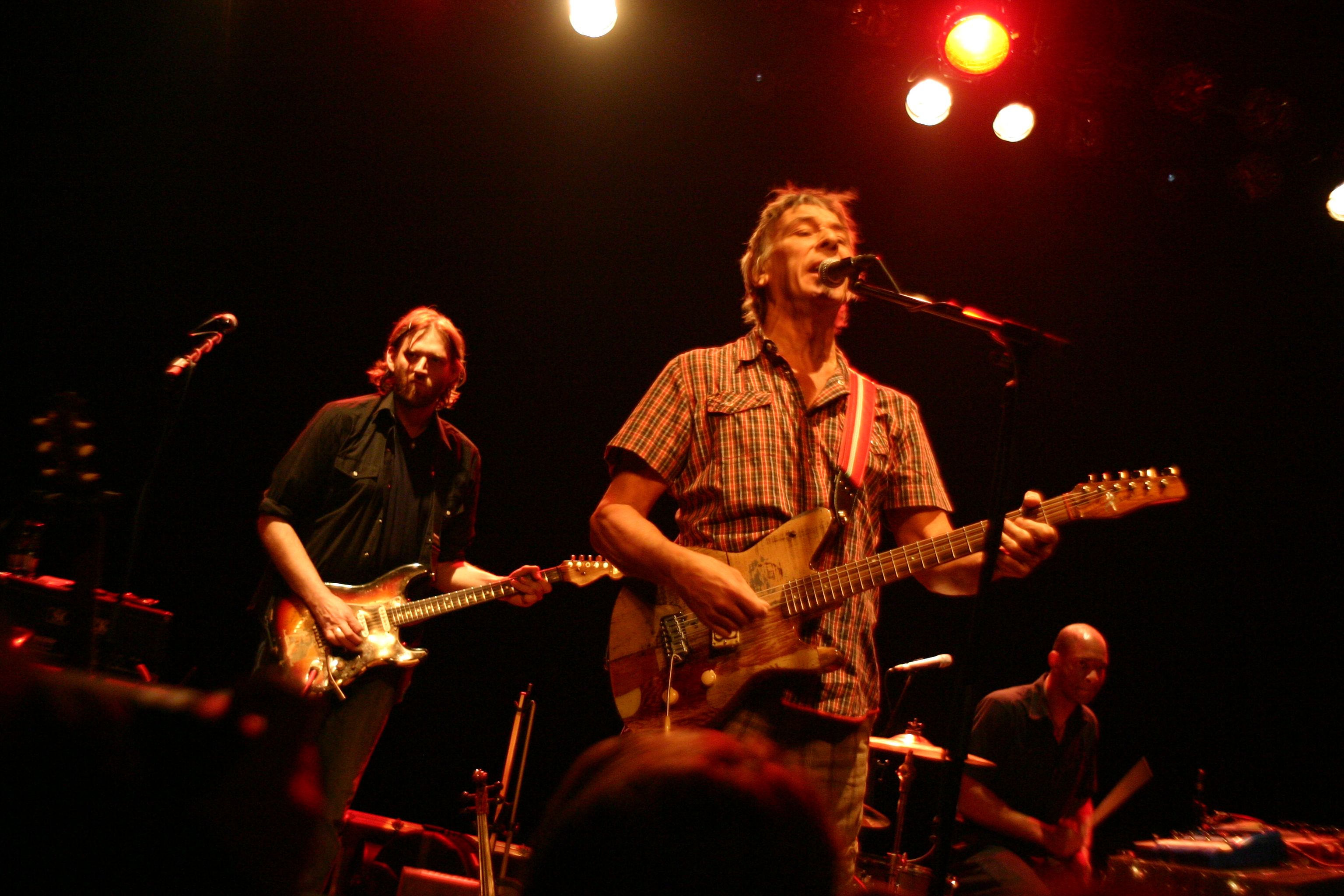
- Dustin Boyer (left) with John Cale and drummer Michael Jerome in Prague, 2006

Background information
- Also known as: Dustin Curtis Boyer
- Origin: El Cajon, California
- Genres: Rock; pop rock
- Occupation: Singer-songwriter
- Instrument: Guitar
- Years active: 1990s–present
- Label: Soop

Dustin Boyer is an American singer-songwriter and guitarist. He is a longtime collaborator of Welsh rock musician John Cale. He also collaborated with many other artists, such as Jennifer Love Hewitt, Michelle Branch, Andrew Dorff, and Michael Landau.

== Career ==
Boyer comes from El Cajon, California. He was a member of a high school ska punk group Turkey Mallet. They released one album called Chiaroscuro in 1996. The band also featured his brother Trevor Boyer on drums and singer Matt Hoyt. Then he studied at CalArts. In 2000, he founded a rock trio Descanso which also featured his brother and Casey Butler. They released three studio albums. He also played the guitar on records by Macy Gray, Jennifer Love Hewitt and Camille Bright-Smith. He also played the guitar on Long Live Me by The Screamin' Lords.

In 2005, he started playing in John Cale's band. He also performed on his albums blackAcetate (2005; one song only), Extra Playful (2011), Shifty Adventures in Nookie Wood (2012) and Mercy (2023). He also starred in the Eden Cale-directed music video for John Cale's song "Catastrofuk".

He also frequently performs with guitarist Michael Landau. Landau said in a 2006 interview that Boyer is one of his favourite performers. Boyer is also frontman of The Dusty Meadows Band which released three records. Boyer's debut solo album called Fun for Mentals was released in 2007 and was followed by Hell's Not Her (2009) and Cahuenga Gardens (2016). The last one featured Michelle Branch and Mark Lanegan on vocals. His song "Pretend" was featured in a movie called 3 Days to Kill with Kevin Costner in the lead role.

== Discography ==
=== Solo ===
- Fun for Mentals (2007)
- Hell's Not Her (2009)
- Cahuenga Gardens (2016)
- Love Joy Death (2017)
- Devotion (2022)

=== Session ===
- CalArts Jazz 1994 (various, 1994)
- Chiaroscuro (Turkey Mallet, 1996)
- Reggae Chanukah (Alan Eder and Friends, 1999)
- The Id (Macy Gray, 2001)
- Dirty Child (Rosey, 2002)
- BareNaked (Jennifer Love Hewitt, 2002)
- Descanso (Descanso, 2003)
- Ugly on the Inside (Descanso, 2004)
- Shiva Machine (Girish, 2005)
- Sunday Drivers (Descanso, 2005)
- blackAcetate (John Cale, 2005)
- Long Live Me (The Screamin' Lords, 2007)
- Circus Live (John Cale, 2007)
- The Great Divide (Camille Bright-Smith, 2008)
- Believe in Yourself (The Dusty Meadows Band, 2010)
- Bullet (Renegade Creation, 2010)
- Spanky (Spanky Davis, 2010)
- Extra Playful (John Cale, 2011)
- Two Thousand Twenty (Spanky Davis, 2010)
- Shifty Adventures in Nookie Wood (John Cale, 2012)
- Tapes in the Addict (The Dusty Meadows Band, 2012)
- The Abominal Bad Seed and Spiritual Companion (The Dusty Meadows Band, 2014)
- 6 String Theory (Glossop, 2015)
- M:FANS (John Cale, 2016)
- Sweet Birds of Youth (Richard James Simpson, 2017)
- Deep Dream (Richard James Simpson, 2019)
- Sugar the Pill (Richard James Simpson, 2021)
- 3 of 3 EP (Spanky Davis, 2021)
- Run Into the Arrows (Shannon Hudson, 2022)
- Mercy (John Cale, 2023)
- Remy (The Dusty Meadows Band, 2023)
- Poptical Illusion (John Cale, 2024)
- Mixology (Volume 1) (John Cale, 2025)
