= Live...For the Record =

Live album by Fear
- Released: October 25, 1991
- Recorded: 1985
- Genre: Hardcore punk
- Label: Caroline
- Producer: Fear, Ed Rasen

Fear chronology
More Beer (1985)	Live...For the Record (1991)	Have Another Beer with Fear (1995)

Professional ratings
Review scores
Source	Rating
AllMusic	3.5/5 stars

Live...For the Record is a live album by American punk band Fear, released in 1991.

== Track listing ==
1. Null Detector - 1:17
2. I Love Livin' in the City - 1:58
3. New York's Alright If You Like Saxophones- 1:59
4. Beef Bologna - 2:31
5. More Beer - 3:00
6. What Are Friends For? - 2:19
7. Welcome to the Dust Ward - 2:35
8. I Am a Doctor - 2:20
9. We Gotta Get Out of This Place - 2:51
10. Fuck Christmas - 1:24
11. Responsibility - 2:24
12. Hey - 2:01
13. Waiting for the Meat - :49
14. Camarillo - 1:16
15. Foreign Policy - 4:48
16. Give Me Some Action - :53
17. We Destroy the Family - 1:25
18. I Don't Care About You - 1:59
19. Let's Have a War - 2:43

== Personnel ==
- Lee Ving: vocals, guitar, harmonica
- Philo Cramer: guitar, vocals
- Lorenzo Buhne: bass
- Spit Stix: drums
