= El Vez =

American singer-songwriter and musician (born 1960)

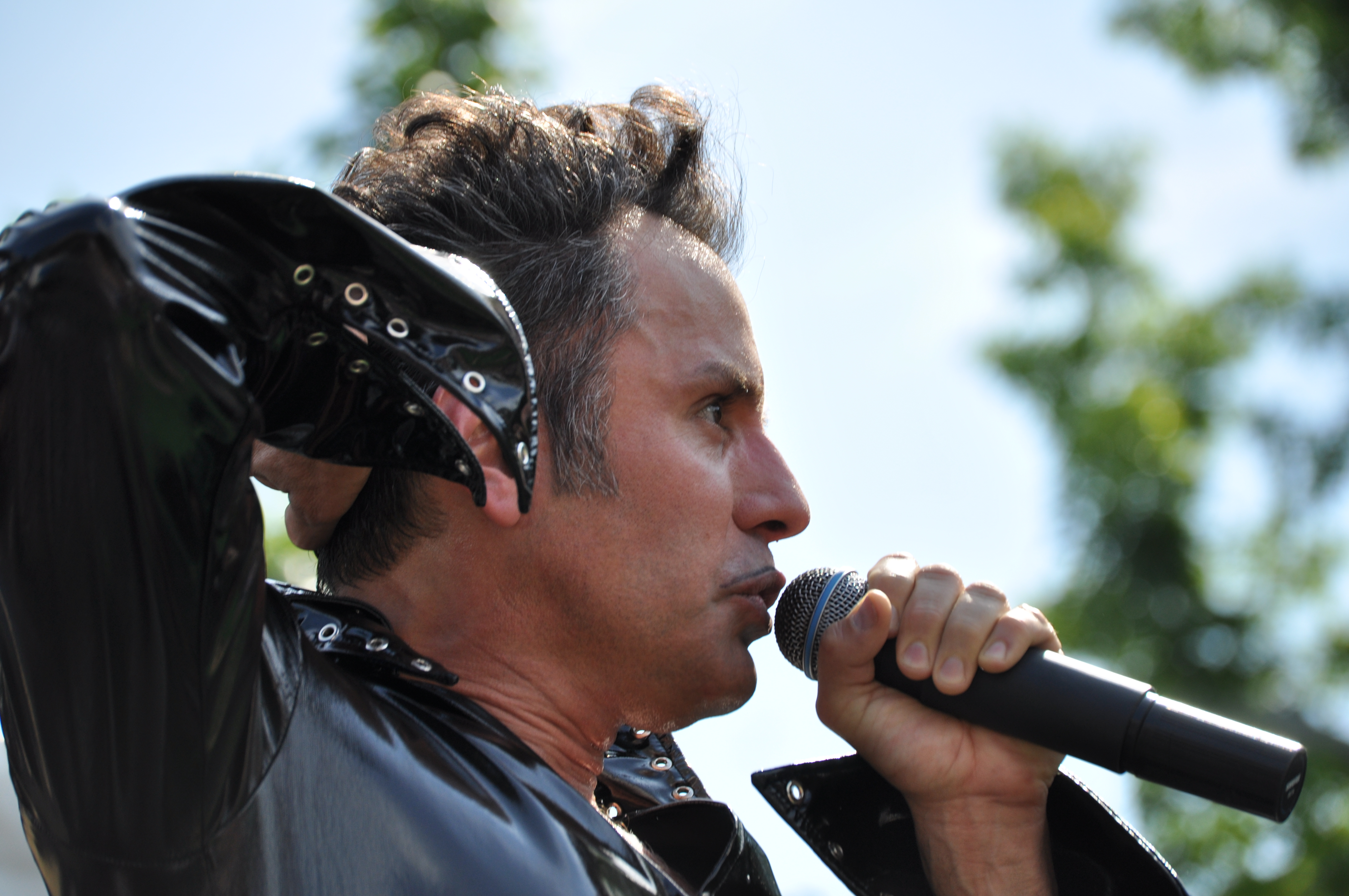
- El Vez performing in Seattle in 2009

Background information
- Born: Robert Alan Lopez; 1960 (age 65–66)
- Origin: Chula Vista, California
- Genres: Latin rock; rock and roll; punk rock
- Occupations: Singer-songwriter; musician
- Instruments: Vocals; guitar; keyboards
- Years active: 1977–present
- Label: Sympathy for the Record Industry
- Formerly of: The Zeros; Catholic Discipline; Trailer Park Casanovas; The Little Richards; Bobby and the Pins
- Website: elvez.net

Robert Alan Lopez (born 1960), better known by his stage name El Vez, is an American singer-songwriter and musician, who performs and records original material and covers classic rock songs. Mixing the styles of Elvis Presley and many other American rock artists with his own Latin-American heritage and music, he is known for expressing revolutionary views through the satire and humor in his songs.

== Early life ==
Lopez was born in Chula Vista, California in 1960. His family "floated somewhere between middle and lower-middle class. Our diet included government cheese and something we called 'poor people's chop suey' a few times a week." He later described himself as a misfit in his youth, saying that he cried easily, did not have many friends, and "was a very, very chubby kid who had found his nest of salt in Warhol, Dalí, and the arts. I would spend my lunchtimes in the school library." His mother, Gina, recalled that "He was always artistic. He was first on his block to have platform shoes. They were about a foot high."

His family was highly political, including an uncle who was in the militant Chicano group the Brown Berets. His grandparents were born in Mexico, and he frequently traveled there as a youth, visiting its museums and Mesoamerican pyramids, experiences he cited as influences on his later musical work. He would become more conscious and appreciative of his Mexican heritage later in life, but did not learn any Spanish until he took a few classes while attending Chula Vista High School.

Lopez attended his first concert in 1974, a performance by Led Zeppelin. His second concert was the New York Dolls, whom he much preferred. He became interested in rock music, reading Creem and Rock Scene magazines, but could only imagine what the bands sounded like. His first exposure to punk rock came from watching PBS, on which he saw Iggy Pop perform, and from his older sister Rhoda. The PBS series An American Family was also an early influence on both his musical tastes and sexual identity: "That is where I was introduced to Lance Loud and Kristian Hoffman (both of whom would go on to form the NYC-based punk band the Mumps). They were Southern California residents interested in rock music and the work of Andy Warhol who eventually moved to New York City. In 1975 they would be my first gay role models from watching television. They would become my friends the next year."

== Career ==
=== The Zeros (1976–1978) ===
In 1976, at age 16, Lopez started a band with classmate Javier Escovedo; Lopez played guitar, while Escovedo played guitar and sang. Called the Main Street Brats, the group played their first show at a quinceañera in Mexico's Rosarito Beach. The lineup then changed; Lopez recruited his cousin Karton "Baba" Chanelle to play drums, and Chanelle's Sweetwater High School classmate Hector Penalosa to play bass, and they changed their name to the Zeros. As the first punk rock band in San Diego, they had difficulty finding places to perform, so they frequently traveled north to Los Angeles which had a thriving punk scene. Their first L.A. performance, at the Orpheum Theatre, was also the debut performance by the Germs, and was headlined by the Weirdos. Though only teenagers, the Zeros became regulars on the L.A. club scene, playing shows with bands such as the Dils, the Avengers, X, the Plugz, the Nerves, the Wipers, the Germs, Devo, and the Damned. They performed in the area so frequently that they were often mistaken for an L.A. band; one magazine even included them in a photo-essay of East L.A. acts. "Those early shows were pretty inspiring", Lopez wrote forty years later; "I felt part of a movement, or something at least. Part of a music scene. It was a great feeling after years of misfitdom." Lopez stated that the scene included women, people of color, and LGBT individuals, and differed from stereotypical punk subcultures. He became a fan of the art of Gary Panter, the writings of Claude Bessy in Slash magazine and Craig Lee in LA Weekly, and performance artists such as the Kipper Kids and Johanna Went, and idolized Tomata du Plenty and his band the Screamers.

The Zeros' Mexican American heritage earned them the nickname "the Mexican Ramones", coined by a friend and solidified when it was used in a Los Angeles Times article. "I loved the Ramones, so I didn't mind the title", Lopez later recalled; "But we thought our style was more New York Dolls and Velvet Underground; after all, we had guitar solos. Yeah, we were Mexicans—so what? It wasn't our calling card. Funny enough, that would become my raison d'être for my later performing—always a 'Mexican' something."

Lopez played on the Zeros' first two singles, "Don't Push Me Around" backed with "Wimp" (1977) and "Wild Weekend" backed with "Beat Your Heart Out" (1978), both released on Bomp! Records. By mid-1978, however, the band was beginning to fracture: "Javier was complaining that Hector was playing in too many different bands", recalled Lopez in 2016; "That seemed to be the main complaint, though there were others." By that August, Penalosa had moved to Los Angeles and was replaced on bass by Lopez's younger brother Guy. Both Lopez brothers soon quit the band, also to move to Los Angeles, and the Zeros briefly disbanded. "I suppose I was ready for a change", said Lopez; "They re-formed the next week without me and then moved to San Francisco. I don't remember being too broken up about it."

Having graduated high school early that year, and turned 18 by that summer, Lopez moved to Hollywood on September 28, 1978. Jane Wiedlin of the Go-Go's had just moved out of the Canterbury Apartments, a 1920s apartment building on Hollywood Boulevard inhabited by a number of L.A. punk musicians and located across the street from punk club the Masque, and left her apartment to Lopez. He supported himself with a job at a nearby Pizza Hut. That winter, he and Margot Olavarria, who had recently been dismissed from the Go-Go's, traveled to New York City, where Lopez stayed for a few months with friends who had transplanted from Los Angeles. There he met various local punk performers; attended shows at clubs such as CBGB, Max's Kansas City, and the Mudd Club; and went to Studio 54 "to pick fights with Steve Rubell." On his return to Los Angeles, he moved into an apartment just west of La Brea Avenue vacated by Screamers lyricist Gorilla Rose, and worked as a cashier at El Coyote Cafe.

=== Catholic Discipline (1979–1980) ===
Settling into Los Angeles, Lopez joined a band called the Johnnies as well as the short-lived group Catholic Discipline, in which he played a Farfisa Combo Compact keyboard. Consisting of personalities from the L.A. punk scene, Catholic Discipline was fronted by Slash magazine editor Claude "Kickboy Face" Bessy and also included Phranc of Nervous Gender as well as Craig Lee, music writer for LA Weekly and guitarist in the Bags. "I think we saw Catholic Discipline as a 'postpunk' band", said Lopez in 2016. He appeared with the group in the documentary film The Decline of Western Civilization (1981), and his recordings with them appear on the film's soundtrack album and on their posthumous compilation album Underground Babylon (2004).

In subsequent years Lopez worked at the Continental Hyatt House hotel on the Sunset Strip; there, he frequently brought room service orders to rock and roll legend Little Richard, a longtime resident of the hotel. "He was a nice guy and a good tipper", recalled Lopez in 2014.

=== Developing El Vez (1988–1990) ===
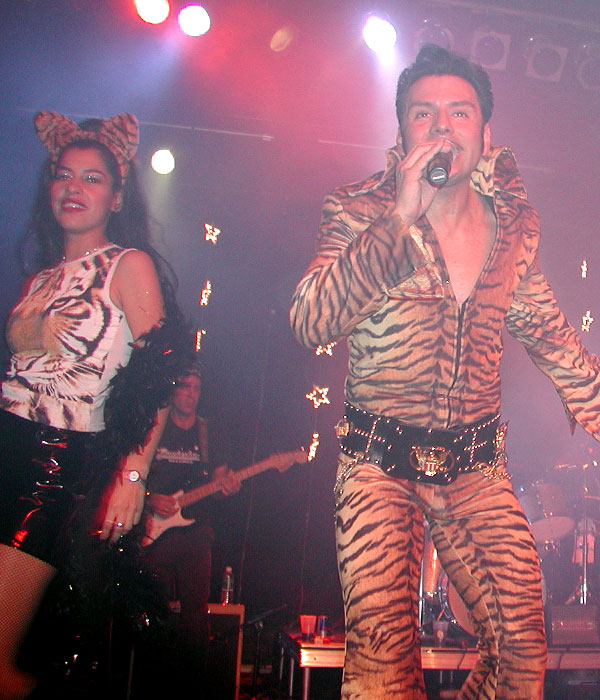
El Vez performing with his backing band the Memphis Mariachis and backing singers the Lovely Elvettes

For much of the 1980s Lopez channeled his creative energies toward art. In 1988 he was curating La Luz de Jesus, a folk art gallery where he showcased campy religious art imported from Mexico and Central America. The gallery presented a show of Elvis Presley-themed works; Lopez hired an Elvis impersonator to appear at the opening, and dressed himself up as Elvis' manager, Colonel Tom Parker. He was unimpressed with the impersonator's performance, however, and felt that he could do better. "I kept critiquing him. 'Swing your hips more'", he later recalled. Conceiving the idea for a cultural mash-up between Elvis and Chicano culture, he traveled to Memphis, Tennessee that August for "Elvis Week", an annual event commemorating Presley's death, purchased karaoke cassettes of Elvis songs at Graceland, and performed a set as "El Vez, the Mexican Elvis" at a roadhouse specializing in Elvis impersonators. Wearing gold lamé pants and an oversize gold sombrero, he sang along to the cassettes while giving the lyrics a Hispanic twist: "That's All Right Mama" became "Esta Bien Mamacita", "Blue Suede Shoes" became "Huaraches Azules", "Hound Dog" became "You Ain't Nothing But a Chihuahua", and so on. "I just dared myself to go," he recalled, "and I said, okay, I can make a fool of myself since I don't know anyone there. I rewrote some words on the plane, and practiced my dance moves in the hotel room."

The performance was well-received, and Lopez brought the act back to Los Angeles. "I had meant to do it just once, and it kind of backfired", he later recalled. "It got a mention in the Los Angeles Times. And then I got a call from an NBC TV show called 2 Hip 4 TV. So I was doing national TV before I'd even done my first show in L.A. Then my very first show in L.A. got pick-of-the-week in both papers, and no one had even seen it yet. So I was really on a con roll. It was like, how much can I get away with?" Initially his repertoire consisted merely of cover versions of Elvis songs with new lyrics, and the performances were, in Lopez's words, "very guerrilla theatre". The act was mostly silly and kitsch, presenting El Vez as "the love child between Elvis and Charo", complete with a fake Spanish accent (Lopez has no such accent). He used the marketing skills he had developed promoting artists and shows for the gallery to promote his new act. "That first year was really great", he later said. "I was just making it up. It was a con. Everyone thought I knew what I was doing, but I was having fun and I had that punk rock 'Do It Yourself' attitude."

A turning point came when he reworked the Elvis song "In the Ghetto" into "En el Barrio", realizing that he could use his humorous act to make social commentary about the Mexican American experience: "The first stuff was just really silly ditties, like 'You Ain't Nothing but a Chihuahua'. Then with 'En el Barrio', I realized that this guy [El Vez] can put some messages out there." As he developed a cult following in Los Angeles, he assembled a full backing band ("the Memphis Mariachis"), added a team of female backing vocalists ("the Lovely Elvettes", with the stage names Priscillita, Lisa Maria, Gladyscita, and Que Linda Thompson, after Elvis' wife Priscilla Presley, daughter Lisa Marie Presley, mother Gladys Presley, and girlfriend Linda Thompson), incorporated increasingly elaborate costuming and staging, and developed songs that mixed politics and cultural commentary with tropes from rock and roll and pop music: "I took on the banner of heralding the Chicano experience, and once I got an agenda under my El Vez belt, the show kind of changed."

=== First El Vez recordings, Raul Raul, and reunions with the Zeros (1991–1995) ===
El Vez's recorded debut came in 1991 with the 7-inch EP The Mexican Elvis. Consisting of "Esta Bien Mamacita" (sung in Spanish) and "En el Barrio" (sung in English, and incorporating elements of the Traffic song "Dear Mr. Fantasy" and the Beatles' "I've Got a Feeling"), it was released by independent record label Sympathy for the Record Industry, which would put out many subsequent El Vez recordings. A second EP, El Vez Calling, followed a few months later; its cover art parodied Presley's 1956 debut album Elvis Presley, while its title and back cover parodied the Clash's London Calling, the artwork of which was itself an homage to Elvis Presley. It consisted of two more reworked Elvis numbers, "(Marie's the Name) His Latest Flame" and "Lawdy Miss Clawdy" redone respectively as "Maria's the Name (of His Latest Flame)" (using Bow Wow Wow's 1982 version of "I Want Candy" as its musical foundation) and "Lordy Miss Lupe".

Also in 1991, the original lineup of the Zeros—Lopez, Escovedo, Chanelle, and Penalosa—reunited to play a benefit show for Lopez's former Catholic Discipline bandmate Craig Lee. Recording sessions the band conducted in San Diego that December produced the singles "I Don't Wanna" backed with "Little Latin Lupe Lu" and "Bottoms Up" backed with "Sneakin' Out", both released in 1992.

Lopez continued releasing records as El Vez over the next few years: The EP Not Hispanic came out in 1992 through Spain's Munster Records, combining different mixes of songs from the prior two El Vez EPs with three new tracks: "Samba Para Elvis" (combining the music of the Santana instrumental "Samba Pa Ti" with the lyrics to Elvis' version of "Always on My Mind"), "Black Magic Woman" (mixing elements of the Santana version of the song with a sped-up take on the Stray Cats' 1981 rockabilly hit "Stray Cat Strut"); the title came from Lopez's reworked lyrics for the closing track, "Never Been to Spain" (inspired by Elvis' 1972 performance of the song as captured on As Recorded at Madison Square Garden). The compilation album How Great Thou Art: The Greatest Hits of El Vez followed in 1994, combining the tracks from the three prior EPs with a version of "Samba Para Ti" featuring keyboardist Paul Morris of Rainbow and a recording of "How Great Thou Art"; the album's title and cover art were an homage to Elvis' 1967 album How Great Thou Art. A Spanish language version of the album was also released under the title Fun in Español, the title and cover parodying Elvis' Fun in Acapulco (1963).

I think he's a real message of pride and a real positive idea of what America is: Elvis Presley being the greatest American entertainer success story, going from nothing to being one of the richest entertainers in the world. The idea of El Vez is you can do that also, and you don't have to be a white man. It's for blacks, Mexicans, women. Anyone can be a superstar. El Vez is the idea of the melting pot, and everyone's welcome. It's Elvis as the American Dream.

— Lopez in 1994

The first proper full-length El Vez studio album, Graciasland, was released in 1994 by Sympathy for the Record Industry. Its title and cover art parodied Paul Simon's 1986 album Graceland, and the track "Aztlán" reworked Simon's title track with politically charged lyrics describing a search for the ancestral home of the Aztecs. Several more Elvis songs were similarly given the El Vez treatment: "Suspicious Minds" became "Immigration Time", dealing with immigration rights; "Little Sister" was redone as "Chicanisma" (a Spanish grammatical gender inversion of the term Chicanismo), about the empowerment of Latina women; and "Baby Let's Play House" turned into "Safe (Baby Let's Play Safe)", with cautionary lyrics promoting safe sex. "Cinco de Mayo", an original song musically rooted in the Who, the Clash, and the Dils, traced the story of the Battle of Puebla and featured Chip and Tony Kinman of Blackbird (formerly of the Dils). Music critic Kembrew McLeod later called the album "El Vez's best work, smoothly combining humor, social and political satire, and great rock & roll in one fell swoop." A Christmas album, Merry MeX-mas, followed later that year, and El Vez began staging annual Christmas-themed performances that became big hits with his fans.

In mid-1994 Lopez also began performing as a new character, Raul Raul, who he described to the Los Angeles Times as "a real angry Chicano beat poet. I enjoy it because he's a solo act with no props or dancing girls to fall back on. It's almost the opposite of El Vez, who is always so happy and positive-thinking. Raul Raul is yelling, spouting, finger-pointing at the 'white devil slave masters' and all that. But it's really humorous." Also in 1994 Lopez reunited with the Zeros for the band's first full-length studio album, Knockin' Me Dead, which consisted of new recordings of their old material. The Zeros toured Spain in the spring of 1995, and a live album titled Over the Sun was recorded in Madrid that March and released later that year by Madrid's Imposible Records. Also in 1995 Munster Records released the El Vez live album El Vez Is Alive, documenting his performance at the 1991 Roskilde Festival in Denmark. Lopez began incorporating the Raul Raul character into his El Vez performances; in a New York Times review of his 1995 Christmas show in Manhattan, journalist Neil Strauss wrote: "The set's highlight was its most atypical moment, the reading of a poem by El Vez's alter ego, Raul Raul, an angry-young-man poet. As Vince Guaraldi's theme music from the Peanuts cartoons played in the background, he decried racism in the Sunday comics with lines like, 'Hey Charlie, I'm brown/Por que no Latinos in your stinking town?' Underneath the humor, there was a message. And underneath the message, there was more humor."

=== Continued work as El Vez and with the Zeros (1996–2004) ===
In May 1996 Munster Records released the El Vez compilation album Never Been to Spain (Until Now) for the Spanish market. El Vez's next studio album, G.I. Ay, Ay! Blues, came out that September through Philadelphia's Big Pop Label; with a title and cover art parodying Elvis' G.I. Blues (1960), it found El Vez diversifying his musical palette even further and getting even more political with his lyrics. The EP A Lad from Spain? was released in 1998 by Sympathy for the Record Industry; consisting of alternate versions of previously released songs, its title and cover art parodied David Bowie's 1973 album Aladdin Sane. It was released on compact disc the following year as Son of a Lad from Spain?, with some of the tracks from the original EP as well as added songs, radio performances, and other recordings. Lopez reunited with the Zeros once again for their 1999 album Right Now!

The year 2000 saw the release of two El Vez albums through British label Poptones: The compilation Pure Aztec Gold (titled after Elvis' 1975 compilation Pure Gold) and a second Christmas album, NöElVezSí. In early 2001 a documentary film about El Vez was released; directed by Marjorie Chodorov and titled El Rey de Rock 'n' Roll, it traced the evolution of his act through concert footage, excerpts from television appearances, and interviews with friends, fans, and Latino academics. That November, El Vez released the gospel music-influenced studio album Boxing with God through Sympathy for the Record Industry, and in 2002 started his own label, Graciasland Records, through which he released a third Christmas album, Sno-Way José (its cover mimicking Bing Crosby's Merry Christmas).

In 2004 Lopez relocated from Los Angeles to Seattle, drawn by the city's eclectic art and theater scene. There, he began performing as El Vez regularly at Teatro ZinZanni, a circus-themed dinner theater. As Graciasland Records' second release, he issued Endless Revolution, a "Service Re-Issue" of G.I. Ay, Ay! Blues in an expanded two-disc package. 2004 being a presidential election year in the United States, he embarked on an "El Vez for Prez" tour, encouraging fans to vote for him as a write-in candidate; he repeated this tour theme in 2008 and 2012. By the mid-2000s, El Vez had toured the United States, Canada, Mexico, Europe, and Australia, and had opened for such famous performers as David Bowie, Carlos Santana, and the B-52's.

== Musical and performance style ==
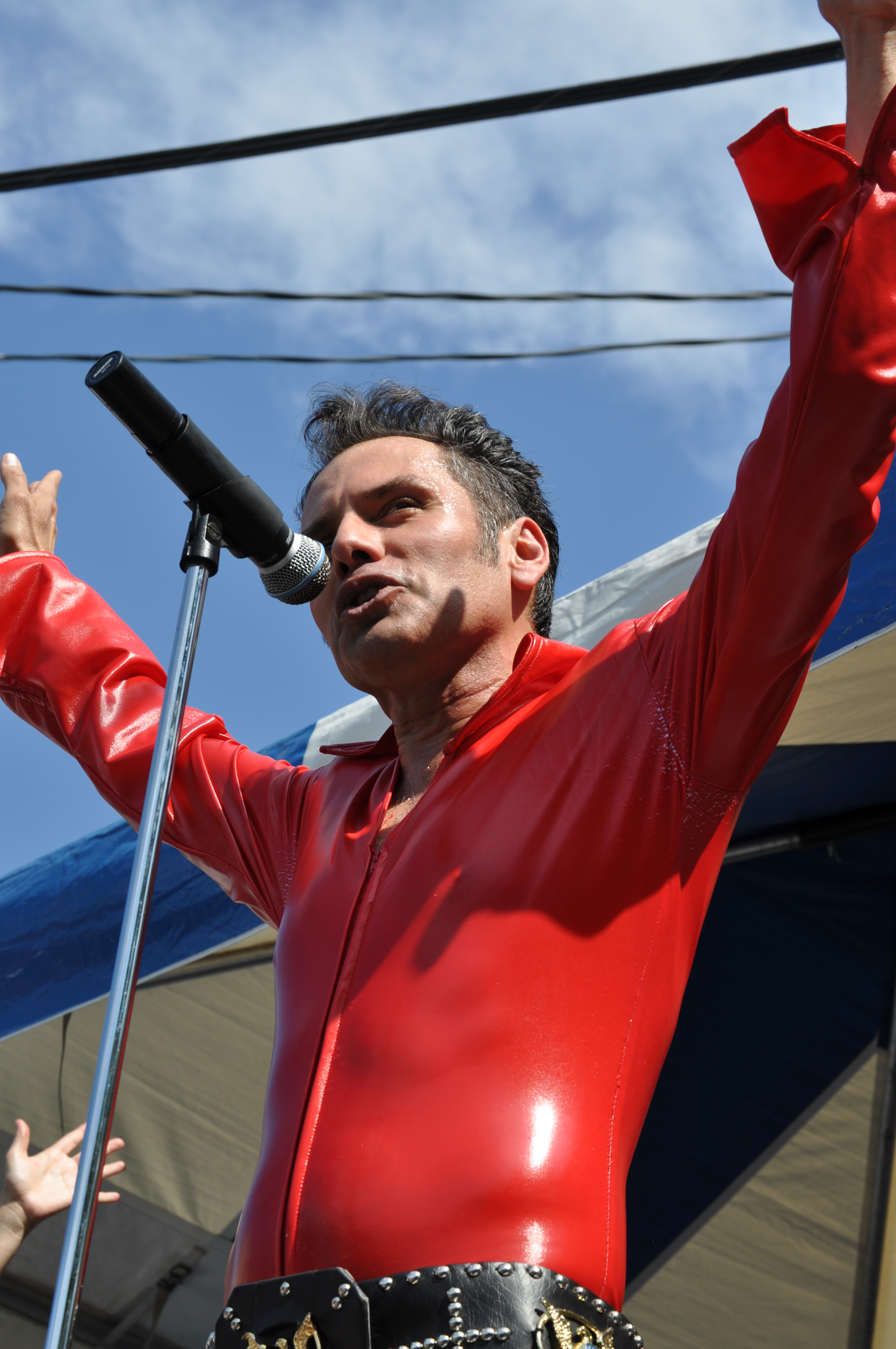
El Vez performing in Seattle in 2009, wearing a tight-fitting Elvis-inspired jumpsuit

Lopez cites a wide variety of musical influences including Elvis Presley, David Bowie, the San Diego rock band Rocket from the Crypt, and the Make-Up, a post-punk band from Washington, D.C. who mixed garage rock and gospel music. He considers his El Vez persona to be an "Elvis interpreter" and "cultural ambassador" rather than strictly an Elvis impersonator. He creates all the arrangements for his El Vez performances, which he describes as "all my musical history, and the little things that meant something to me, or the sounds that I like." Reviewing a 1995 performance, journalist Neil Strauss described the music as "a whirlwind of pop quotations, full of references to the music of David Bowie, José Feliciano, Patsy Cline, and the punk bands the Stooges and Public Image Ltd."

In developing the look of El Vez, Lopez took Elvis-inspired jumpsuits made of tight-fitting polyester and lamé which show off his slender frame, and added Mexican cultural clichés such as sequined images of Our Lady of Guadalupe, extravagantly embroidered bolero jackets, sombreros with ball fringe, pointed-toe boots, and elements of mariachi costuming. His live shows involve multiple costume changes; early on, he would make his final costume change on stage, the Elvettes holding up a sheet with a throbbing strobe light behind it so the audience could see the shadow of his naked body as he changed. In addition to his costumes, he styled his hair in a pompadour and drew a pencil moustache on his lip using marker. When in character as El Vez, he speaks with a fake Spanish accent.

Music critic Kembrew McLeod described El Vez's live performances as follows:

While his records are excellent documents of the El Vez phenomenon, the only way to get the full El Vez experience is to see his live shows [...] Listening to El Vez is akin to hearing the live-band equivalent of sampling. An audience on any given night can be treated to half a dozen costume changes and might hear bits and pieces of at least 200 songs, not all of them Elvis recordings. For instance, one of his medleys featured "You Ain't Nothing But a Chihuahua" and an instrumental version of the Beastie Boys' "Gratitude", mixed in with the lead guitar riff from Santana's "Black Magic Woman" laid underneath Rod Stewart's "Maggie May", which melded into "En el Barrio" (aka "In the Ghetto") and finished up with the mandolin line that concludes R.E.M.'s "Losing My Religion".

McLeod also described El Vez's lyrical style:

Despite his use of humor, El Vez cannot be written off as a postmodern joke. His lyrics (many times rewrites of Elvis recordings or other popular songs) are very political and pro-Latino. Much like Rage Against the Machine, his songs are littered with references to the Zapatistas and other Mexican revolutionaries. Unlike the above-mentioned band, he does not beat the audience over the head with didactic polemics and testosterone-fueled monster chords. Instead, he relies on the obvious play on words ("Say It Loud, I'm Brown and I'm Proud" and "Misery Tren") and clever social satire (at the climax of "Immigration Time", sung to the tune of "Suspicious Minds", he shouts "I've got my green card...I want my gold card!").

Lopez's main persona and style is very similar to Elvis Presley, as his stage name suggests. However, he is not strictly an Elvis impersonator; on his recordings and in his live show, he covers many non-Mexican artists, such as David Bowie, Iggy Pop, John Lennon, Bob Dylan, Paul Simon, T. Rex, Queen and the Beatles. He is also known as the "Thin Brown Duke" (a reference to one of David Bowie's characters, the "Thin White Duke"), or "The Mexican Elvis".

El Vez was once a contestant on the game show To Tell the Truth and starred in Wes Hurley's cult comedy musical Waxie Moon in Fallen Jewel. He was also a contestant on The Weakest Link during an episode featuring Elvis impersonators.

He also performed "It's Now or Never", which was featured on the soundtrack of the 2009 feature film The Hangover.

== Discography ==
Year	Artist	Title	Type	Format	Label	Catalog	Notes
1977	The Zeros	"Don't Push Me Around" b/w "Wimp"	single	7"	Bomp! Records	BOMP 110	
1978	The Zeros	"Wild Weekend" b/w "Beat Your Heart Out"	single	7"	Bomp! Records	BOMP 118	
1980	Catholic Discipline	The Decline of Western Civilization	soundtrack album	LP, CD	Slash Records	SR 105	track "Underground Babylon"
1989	The Zeros	The Zeros	EP	7"	Munster Records	TFOSR 7006	compilation of demos recorded in 1977
1991	The Zeros	Don't Push Me Around (Rare & Unreleased Classics from '77)	compilation album	LP, CD	Bomp! Records	BLP/BCD 4035	
1991	El Vez	The Mexican Elvis	EP	7"	Sympathy for the Record Industry	SFTRI 111	
1991	El Vez	El Vez Calling	EP	7"	Sympathy for the Record Industry	SFTRI 160	
1992	El Vez	Not Hispanic	EP	12"	Munster Records	MR 024	
1992	The Zeros	"I Don't Wanna" b/w "Little Latin Lupe Lu"	single	7"	Sympathy for the Record Industry	SFTRI 166	
1992	The Zeros	"Bottoms Up" b/w "Sneakin' Out"	single	7"	Rockville Records	ROCK 6091-7	
1994	The Zeros	"Knockin' Me Dead" b/w "Boys"	single	7"	Rockville Records	ROCK 6128-7	
1994	The Zeros	Knockin' Me Dead	studio album	LP, CD	Rockville Records	ROCK 6129	
1994	The Zeros	"Sometimes Good Guys Don't Wear White" b/w "Knockin' Me Dead (acoustic)"	single	7"	Munster Records	7062	
1994	El Vez	How Great Thou Art: The Greatest Hits of El Vez	compilation album	CD	Sympathy for the Record Industry	SFTRI 199	
1994	El Vez	Fun in Español	compilation album	CD	Sympathy for the Record Industry	SFTRI 234-S	Spanish language version of How Great Thou Art: The Greatest Hits of El Vez
1994	El Vez	Graciasland	studio album	CD	Sympathy for the Record Industry	SFTRI 302	
1994	El Vez	"Cinco de Mayo" b/w "Blackbird de Mayo (with Blackbird)"	single	7"	Sympathy for the Record Industry	SFTRI 315	
1994	El Vez	Merry MeX-mas	Christmas album	CD	Sympathy for the Record Industry	SFTRI 350	
1995	El Vez	Like a Hole in the Head: Remixes, Rewrites & Extras	EP	10"	Sympathy for the Record Industry	SFTRI 375	
1995	El Vez	El Vez Is Alive	live album	LP, CD	Munster Records	MR 081	
1995	The Zeros	European Kamikaze Tour '95 ("Yo No Quiero" b/w "Siamese Tease")	single	7"	Munster Records	7076	
1995	The Zeros	Over the Sun	live album	LP, CD	Imposible Records	IMP 040	
1995	The Zeros	"Black 'n' White" b/w "Pushin' Too Hard"	single	7"	Planet of Noise Records	PON 003	
1996	El Vez	The Mexican Elvis!	EP	7", CD	Munster Records	7092/MRCD 099	
1996	El Vez	Never Been to Spain (Until Now)	compilation album	CD	Munster Records	MRCD 101	
1996	El Vez	G.I. Ay, Ay! Blues	studio album	CD	Big Pop	BP 0910-2	
1998	El Vez	TCB ("20th Century Boy" b/w "Takin' Care of Business")	EP	5"	Sympathy for the Record Industry	SFTRI 452	
1998	El Vez	A Lad from Spain?	EP	10"	Sympathy for the Record Industry	SFTRI 453	
1998	The Zeros	"You, Me, Us" b/w "Talkin'"	single	7"	Penniman Records	PENN 45002	
1999	The Zeros	Right Now!	studio album	LP, CD	Bomp! Records	BLP/BCD 4074	
1999	El Vez	Son of a Lad from Spain?	compilation album	CD	Sympathy for the Record Industry	SFTRI 595	
1999	Trailer Park Casanovas	End of an Era	studio album	CD	Rock Therapy Records	RTCD 20001	
2000	Trailer Park Casanovas	Live at Caesars Palace!!! The Wedding Album Cover to Cover	live album	CD	Rock Therapy Records	RTCD 20002	
2000	El Vez	Pure Aztec Gold	compilation album	CD	Poptones	ESCA 8316	
2000	El Vez	NöElVezSí	Christmas album	CD	Poptones	MC 5010CD	
2000	El Vez	"Feliz Navidad" b/w "Oralé (I♥JSBX)"	single	7"	Poptones	MC 5010S	
2000	El Vez	"Maria's the Name (No Fun)" b/w "Now I Wanna Be Santa Claus"	single	7"	Houston Party Records	HPR V033	
2001	El Vez	Boxing with God	studio album	CD	Sympathy for the Record Industry	SFTRI 676	
2001	Los Straitjackets	Sing Along with Los Straitjackets	studio album	CD	Yep Roc Records	YEP 2028	track "Rey Criollo a/k/a/ King Creole" (as El Vez)
2002	Trailer Park Casanovas	So Charmin'	studio album	CD	El Toro Records	ETCD 3010	
2002	Kristian Hoffman	&	studio album	CD	Eggbert Records	ER 80032	track "Madison Avenue" (as El Vez)
2002	El Vez	Sno-Way José	Christmas album	CD	Graciasland Records	GR 001	
2004	Catholic Discipline	Underground Babylon	compilation album	LP, CD	Artifix Records	SPR 020	
2004	El Vez	Endless Revolution: G.I. Ay Ay Blues Service Re-issue	studio album	CD	Graciasland Records	GR 002	expanded reissue of G.I. Ay, Ay! Blues
2008	El Vez	Gospel Show in Madrid	video album	DVD	Munster Records	MR DVD 007	
2009	The Zeros	Live in Madrid	video album	DVD	Munster Records	MR DVD 009	
2010	The Zeros	"Main Street Brat" b/w "Handgrenade Heart"	single	7"	Last Laugh Records	HAW 007	recorded in 1977
2013	El Vez	God Save the King: 25 Years of El Vez	compilation album	CD	Munster Records	MR CD 334	
2015	The Little Richards	...Bama Lama, Bama Loo	studio album	LP	Sympathy for the Record Industry	SFTRI 787	
2015	The Little Richards	"The Girl Can't Help It" b/w "Slippin' and Slidin'"	single	7"	Sympathy for the Record Industry	SFTRI 788	
2017	Los Straitjackets with Big Sandy & El Vez	...To the Rescue	EP	7"	Sleazy Records	SR 120	track "El Vez to the Rescue"
2017	El Vez	"Liz Renay" (with the Schizophonics) b/w "Trouble" (karaoke mix)	single	7"	Sympathy for the Record Industry	SFTRI 798	
2023	Secret Agent feat. El Vez	Loose Lips Sink Ships	EP	CD	Triple Agent Records	TAR 06	"I'm Not A Spy (I'm Your Guy)"
2023	Pollo Del Mar feat. El Vez	Vol. VI	compilation album	CD	Triple Agent Records	TAR 106	"En Mi Mundo"
2026	Secret Agent feat. El Vez	Live In Mexico City	EP	promo digital download	Triple Agent Records	TAR 10	"Rumble / El Vez To The Rescue, I'm Not A Spy (I'm Your Guy), Mexican Radio"

== Filmography ==
- Mi vida loca (1993)
- El Rey De Rock 'N' Roll (2000, documentary)
- Colorvision (2004, TV-Serie)
- Gospel Show in Madrid (2008, live concert)
- Dead Country (2008)
- Several other appearances in documentaries
- 2 Hip 4 TV (NBC variety show)
- Waxie Moon in Fallen Jewel (2015)
- Fags in the Fast Lane (2017)
