= American Beer (album) =

Studio album by Fear
- Released: September 5, 2000
- Recorded: 2000
- Genre: Hardcore punk
- Length: 37:11
- Label: Hall of Records
- Producer: Kevin Oberlin, Lee Ving

Fear chronology
| Have Another Beer with Fear (1995) | American Beer (2000) | The Fear Record (2012) |

Professional ratings
Review scores
| Source | Rating |
|---|---|
| AllMusic | 2/5 stars |

American Beer is a studio album by Fear, released in 2000. Many of the album's tracks were written and recorded during Fear's earlier years, but had not appeared on any prior studio albums.

== Track listing ==
All songs by Lee Ving, except where noted.

| No. | Title | Length |
|---|---|---|
| 1. | "Surgery" | 1:21 |
| 2. | "The Bud Club" | 2:50 |
| 3. | "I'm Your Hoochie Coochie Man" (Willie Dixon) | 2:22 |
| 4. | "Beer:30" | 1:06 |
| 5. | "Catfight" (Philo Cramer) | 1:56 |
| 6. | "Beerheads" | 2:14 |
| 7. | "Hard 'Cotto' Salami" | 1:40 |
| 8. | "Another Christmas Beer" | 2:28 |
| 9. | "What's Best in Life" | 3:05 |
| 10. | "33rd & 3rd" | 4:11 |
| 11. | "What If God's Not One of Us" | 3:13 |
| 12. | "I Don't Care Without You" | 3:43 |
| 13. | "Lost in Los Angeles" | 3:10 |
| 14. | "And the Spiders Crawl" | 3:44 |

== Personnel ==
- Lee Ving: vocals, rhythm guitar, harmonica
- Richard Presley: lead guitar
- Mando Lopez: bass
- Andrew Jaimez: drums

== Song analysis ==
- "Surgery" was originally titled "Mengele" (a reference to Josef Mengele, the infamous Nazi doctor) and was performed live numerous times by the band in the 1980s, including during a performance on New Wave Theatre.
- "The Bud Club" was originally titled "Budweiser" and appeared on the bootleg 7" of the same name.
- "Hootchie Cootchie Man", originally made famous by Muddy Waters, was previously performed by Fear in 1983 on the Get Crazy soundtrack.
- "Catfight" was written by original guitarist Philo Cramer and recorded for the band's unreleased 1979 demo, as well as for Cramer's project The Coup d'État Lab Band. It was also performed live many times.
- "Hard 'Cotto' Salami" is a remade version of the well-known Fear song "Beef Bologna".
- "Beer:30" was apparently written in the early 1980s, but was never recorded and never or rarely performed live during that time.
- "Beerheads" was originally entitled "Skinheads", and was performed by the band in the early to mid-1990s.
