= Tony Hawk's American Wasteland =

2005 video game

- Developer: Neversoft (Note: Ported to Microsoft Windows by Aspyr.)
- Publisher: Activision
- Writer: Rob Hammersley
- Series: Tony Hawk's
- Platforms: GameCube; PlayStation 2; Xbox; Xbox 360; Microsoft Windows; Mobile phone
- Release: GameCube, PlayStation 2, Xbox: NA: October 18, 2005; EU: October 28, 2005; Xbox 360: NA: November 22, 2005; EU: December 2, 2005; Mobile: NA: December 5, 2005; Microsoft Windows: NA: February 6, 2006; EU: April 7, 2006
- Genre: Sports
- Modes: Single-player, multiplayer

Tony Hawk's American Wasteland is a 2005 skateboarding video game developed by Neversoft and published by Activision. It is the seventh entry in the Tony Hawk's series and was released initially for the GameCube, PlayStation 2 and Xbox in 2005 in North America on October 18 and October 28 in Europe, launching on the Xbox 360 as a launch title with ports for other systems released later.

American Wasteland is the first Tony Hawk's game to support Xbox Live; online play was previously limited to the PlayStation 2 and Microsoft Windows. The Nintendo DS and Game Boy Advance versions were released as Tony Hawk's American Sk8land on the same day as the console versions. The DS version features Wi-Fi capabilities and was the first third-party DS game to have online support. The Xbox version was playable online until Xbox Live for the original Xbox was shut down in 2010, American Wasteland is now playable online using replacement online servers for the Xbox called Insignia.

== Gameplay ==
American Wasteland is the first game in the Tony Hawk's franchise that advertised and allowed the possibility for players to play in one vast level via story mode, which actually seamlessly connects a number of levels without loading times in between, along with also being the first game in the series that allows to freely commandeer stray bicycles and perform freestyle BMX techniques similar to skateboarding. A new maneuver, the Bert Slide, was added to skateboarding controls. In the September 2005 edition of Game Informer, a map was shown displaying American Wasteland's Los Angeles with an insert of an overhead view of the Boston stage from Underground 2 for comparison. The Boston level appeared to be about three quarters the size of one American Wasteland area, with the exception of the "Vans Skatepark" and "Casino" areas.

== Story ==
The game begins with the protagonist boarding a bus to Los Angeles to escape his delinquent past. Upon arriving in Hollywood, a group of skateboarding punks, led by Joe, punch the player character and steal his bag. The protagonist meets Mindy, a local artist, who helps him fit in through wardrobe changes and a series of skating challenges led by her friends. After, the player confronts Joe and challenges him to a skating contest for his bag, which the player wins.

The protagonist observes Mindy drawing a skatepark in her sketchpad which she reveals will be a part of her magazine titled "American Wasteland", and that it is the Skate Ranch, a "locals-only" park. After the protagonist stops a local protest, Mindy decides to take the player to Beverly Hills, where he uses his skate skills to impress the inhabitants of the ranch led by Iggy VanZandt. They agree to let him in to the skatepark, and allow him to stay after he gathers wood for a half-pipe. While the player character watches Iggy skate, the group reveals that he was previously a professional skateboarder, but he couldn't handle the publicity and dropped out of the public eye. Mindy suggests that the protagonist obtain pieces for the skate ranch, which he gets throughout the game.

The player character participates in the Tony Hawk AmJam in downtown Los Angeles. The protagonist wins and is interviewed by Tony Hawk. After the player publicly reveals his association with the presumed-dead Iggy, the LAPD arrests VanZandt for a string of past minor offenses. Seeking amends for landing Iggy in jail, the player character requests help from VanZandt's old friends: the Z-Boys, including Tony Alva. They agree to do so if he prove his old-school skating skills. After he does so, the Z-Boys show an old photo of "Green Pipes Point": a legendary skate run that the protagonist recognizes as now being the Skate Ranch. The player character decides to have it dug again to make up for getting Iggy arrested. To that effect, the protagonist meets Alva's oil rig worker friend Mega, who decides to help the player after the protagonist completes a series of errands for him.

While Mega works on digging up the Green Pipes Point, the player learns from Mindy that Skate Ranch member Boone has been kidnapped by the "Black Widowz", his old street gang, and needs rescuing from East Los Angeles. However, the Black Widowz own the only tunnel leading to the area, leading the protagonist to join the gang to be allowed entry. After he passes the initiation tests, he enters East LA and rescues Boone.

After Mega finishes digging up the Green Pipes Point, the protagonist gets a call from Iggy in jail, stating that his bail was posted and he will be leaving shortly. When the player character mentions his restoration of Green Pipes Point, Iggy is furious; he explains that he doesn't own the land that it is on, nor does he have the money to buy it. By the time Iggy leaves jail, the actual owner of the Point put the land up for auction, prompting Iggy to punch the protagonist. The player then snaps at Mindy for attempting to help out, but before he can apologize the other group members beckon him away.

The group informs the player character that Tony Hawk is in the area with the belief that if he and other local pros were convinced to record a "Save Green Pipes Point" video and post it online, they could use the proceeds to save the ranch from the auction block. The player rounds up the skaters and begins recording the video, and Iggy apologizes for his past behavior. After trashing a local vacant casino as their finale to the video, the group is met by the police due to trespassing and vandalism. In order to distract the police so the rest of the gang can escape and purchase Green Pipes Point, the player character evades the cops by skating all through LA to get back to the ranch.

The player succeeds in distracting the police. Iggy arrives at Green Pipes Point and successfully purchases the land. To celebrate, he throws a party, and the protagonist apologizes to Mindy for angering her and VanZandt. Mindy accepts the apology, and she shows that she has just published the first issue of her dream magazine, American Wasteland, which Iggy reveals was funded by the proceeds from the video. The protagonist and Mindy kiss.

== Releases ==
American Wasteland was also released on the Xbox 360 in 2005 on November 22 in North America and December 2 in Europe as a launch title, and a Microsoft Windows port was issued by Aspyr in 2006 on February 6 in North America and April 7 in Europe. An additional 'Collector's Edition' was also released for the PlayStation 2 in North America, which added two exclusive characters and two exclusive levels, including a documentary titled "Making of Tony Hawk's American Wasteland".

== Soundtrack album ==
Tony Hawk's American Wasteland

Soundtrack album by various artists
- Released: October 18, 2005
- Genre: Punk rock; hardcore punk; alternative rock
- Length: 34:37
- Label: Vagrant Records
- Producer: Tony Hawk

Various artists chronology
Music From and Inspired by Tony Hawk's Pro Skater 3 (2001)	Tony Hawk's American Wasteland (2005)

Singles from Tony Hawk's American Wasteland
- 1. "Institutionalized" Released: 2005

The American Wasteland soundtrack features a lineup of punk-based bands, each covering a song from a classic punk rock or hardcore punk group. The album features all 14 previously unreleased covers that were recorded for the game. The soundtrack reached number 148 on the Billboard Top 200, number 4 on Billboard Top Soundtracks, and number 10 on Billboard Top Independent Albums. The cover art is an homage to the cover of the 1979 album London Calling by the Clash which, in turn, is an homage to the cover of Elvis Presley's first album. The back cover art is an homage to the back cover art of self-titled album of the Clash. IGN gave the soundtrack a 4.1/10, stating that the soundtrack is aimed towards emo-lovers instead of punk, given that most of the participating bands play in the genre.

No.	Title	Writer(s)	Performing artist	Length
1.	"Institutionalized" (originally performed by Suicidal Tendencies)	Mike Muir, Louiche Mayorga	Senses Fail	3:49
2.	"Suburban Home" / "I Like Food" (originally performed by the Descendents)	Tony Lombardo / Bill Stevenson	Taking Back Sunday	1:56
3.	"Astro Zombies" (originally performed by the Misfits)	Glenn Danzig	My Chemical Romance	2:13
4.	"Search and Destroy" (originally performed by The Stooges)	Iggy Pop, James Williamson	Emanuel	3:22
5.	"Sonic Reducer" (originally performed by The Dead Boys)	David Thomas, Cheetah Chrome	Saves the Day	3:03
6.	"Who Is Who" (originally performed by the Adolescents)	Frank Agnew, Tony Cadena, Steve Soto	Dropkick Murphys	1:22
7.	"Seeing Red" / "Screaming at a Wall" (originally performed by Minor Threat)	Jeff Nelson, Ian MacKaye / MacKaye	Thrice	2:33
8.	"House of Suffering" (originally performed by Bad Brains)	H.R., Dr. Know	The Bled	2:24
9.	"Time to Escape" (originally performed by Government Issue)	John Stabb, Tom Lyle, Mike Fellows, Marc Alberstadt	Hot Snakes	1:47
10.	"Start Today" (originally performed by Gorilla Biscuits)	Walter Schreifels	Fall Out Boy	2:03
11.	"Wash Away" (originally performed by T.S.O.L.)	Jack Grisham, Ron Emory, Mike Roche, Todd Barnes, Greg Kuehn	Alkaline Trio	3:28
12.	"Ever Fallen in Love (With Someone You Shouldn't've)" (originally performed by the Buzzcocks)	Pete Shelley	Thursday	2:52
13.	"Let's Have a War" (originally performed by Fear)	Lee Ving, Philo Cramer	From Autumn to Ashes	2:50
14.	"Fix Me" (originally performed by Black Flag)	Greg Ginn	Rise Against	0:55

Chart (2005)	Peak position
The Billboard 200	148
Top Independent Albums	10
Top Soundtracks	4

== Reception ==
Reception

Aggregate score
Aggregator	Score			
Aggregator	GameCube	PS2	Xbox	Xbox 360
Metacritic	76/100	77/100	77/100	75/100

Review scores
Publication	Score			
Publication	GameCube	PS2	Xbox	Xbox 360
Edge	N/A	N/A	6/10	N/A
Eurogamer	N/A	6/10	N/A	N/A
Game Informer	8.25/10	8.25/10	8.25/10	N/A
GameSpot	7.5/10	7.5/10	7.5/10	6.6/10
IGN	8.5/10	8.5/10	8.5/10	8.3/10

The game received generally positive reviews. The general consensus, however, was that the advertisement of Los Angeles being "one big level", as opposed to the previous games' series of levels, was false, since the "one level" was a series of levels accessible from one another via bland corridors that simply masked the necessary loading times. Jeff Gerstmann of GameSpot took note of how "shockingly easy" the game was compared to previous entries in the series, and how "most of the game feels like a tutorial", although others have viewed this in a light that showcased the game's hefty amount of possibilities, tricks, and techniques that the player can perform in comparison to previous games. Many critics also noted the general lack of evolution in the series, although many saw this as a good thing since the original gameplay was so popular to begin with and didn't need unnecessary tampering.

Many critics praised the game on its story. Chris Roper of IGN praised Neversoft's decision to "go back to its roots and make a game about skating" as opposed to "the chaos and destruction of the Underground games". Jeff Gerstmann of GameSpot wrote that the saving grace of the game is a story mode that follows a 'ragtag group of misfits' who struggle to save the place they call home from evil real estate moguls' plot, and that "along the way, the characters become a little endearing".

== reTHAWed ==
reTHAWed is a community-made mod of the PC version of American Wasteland. It not only contains every skater from the base game, but players can play any pro skaters backported from previous and future Tony Hawk's games along with their animations, as well as community-made content released on THPSGoat. The game also contains a debug menu, additional maps, additional content for the in-game character creator, and more. The mod is still in active development and has been continuously updated since its launch in October 2017. An update to the mod added characters from Postal 2 as part of an official collaboration between the 10K Rising community and Running with Scissors.
