= Catholic Discipline =

American punk rock band

- Origin: Los Angeles, California, U.S.
- Genres: Punk rock; no wave
- Years active: 1979–1980
- Label: Artifix
- Past members: Claude Bessy; Phranc; Craig Lee; Rick Brodey; Robert Lopez; Richard Meade

Catholic Discipline was an American punk rock (first-generation new wave) band, formed in 1979 in San Francisco, California, by Slash Fanzine editor Claude Bessy. The initial line-up of the band featured Bessy on vocals, Phranc on guitar, Rick Brodey on bass guitar, Richard Meade on keyboards and Craig Lee on drums.

== History ==
The band was started in 1979 in San Francisco, first performed at the Hong Kong Café, in August 1979, and played a series of shows around the Los Angeles area. After the first shows, Meade was replaced by keyboardist Robert Lopez. The band is known for their appearance in the 1980 Penelope Spheeris rockumentary film The Decline of Western Civilization, alongside other punk rock bands such as Black Flag, Fear, X, Circle Jerks, Germs, and Alice Bag Band. Catholic Discipline disbanded in spring of 1980. A compilation of the band's live material, Underground Babylon, was released in 2004 through Artifix Records.

During the band's existence, all of the members were also in other bands. Phranc was a keyboardist for Nervous Gender and Craig Lee was the guitarist of Bags. Robert Lopez previously performed with The Zeros and Rick Brodey was an early member of the Bpeople. Phranc argued that Catholic Discipline "was never a real 'band' situation." She further stated: "Everyone was in at least one or two other bands. Some of it was conflict of interest or conflict of personality but it was perfect the way it started and ended."

Following the demise of the band, Bessy moved to the United Kingdom and became a press officer for Rough Trade Records. He also worked as a video DJ at the Haçienda and a music video producer. Phranc embarked a solo career as a folk singer-songwriter and Robert Lopez started to perform under the name, El Vez. Craig Lee became a contributor to Flipside and the music editor of LA Weekly. Lee also co-authored the book Hardcore California: A History of Punk and New Wave. He died in 1991 due to complications from AIDS.

== Members ==
Past members

- Claude Bessy – vocals (1979-1980)
- Phranc – guitars (1979-1980)
- Craig Lee – drums (1979-1980)
- Rick Brodey (AKA: Rick Jaffe, Rick Morrison) – bass (1979-1980)
- Richard Meade – keyboards (1979-1980)
- El Vez (Robert Lopez) – keyboards (1980)

== Discography ==
Compilation albums

- Underground Babylon (2004)

Film appearance

- "Barbee Doll Lust" – The Decline of Western Civilization (January 19, 1980)
- "Underground Babylon" – The Decline of Western Civilization (January 19, 1980)
