= The Decline of Western Civilization =

1981 film by Penelope Spheeris

- The film poster with Germs singer Darby Crash
- Directed by: Penelope Spheeris
- Written by: Penelope Spheeris
- Produced by: Gordon Brown; Jeff Prettyman; Penelope Spheeris
- Cinematography: Steve Conant
- Edited by: Charlie Mullin
- Distributed by: Nu-Image Film (theatrical); Media Home Entertainment (home video)
- Release date: July 1, 1981
- Running time: 100 minutes
- Country: United States
- Language: English

The Decline of Western Civilization is a 1981 American documentary filmed through 1979 and 1980. The movie is about the Los Angeles punk rock scene and was directed by Penelope Spheeris. In 1981, the Los Angeles Police Department chief Daryl Gates wrote a letter demanding the film not be shown again in the city.

The film is the opening act of a trilogy by Spheeris, depicting music scenes in Los Angeles in the late 20th century. The second film, The Decline of Western Civilization Part II: The Metal Years (1988), covers the Los Angeles heavy metal scene of 1987–1988. The third film, The Decline of Western Civilization Part III (1998), chronicles the gutter punk lifestyle of homeless teenagers in 1996–1997.

In 2016, The Decline of Western Civilization was selected by the Library of Congress for preservation in the United States National Film Registry, being deemed "culturally, historically, or aesthetically significant".

== Etymology ==
The film's title is possibly a reference to music critic Lester Bangs' 1970 two-part review of the Stooges' album Fun House, for Creem magazine, where Bangs quotes a friend who had said the popularity of the Stooges signaled "the decline of Western civilization". Another possibility is that the title refers to Darby Crash's reading of Oswald Spengler's Der Untergang des Abendlandes (The Decline of the West). In We Got the Neutron Bomb, an oral history of the L.A. punk rock scene collected by Marc Spitz, Claude Bessy, aka Kickboy, claims that he came up with the title.

== Plot ==
Featuring concert footage of Los Angeles punk bands and interviews both with band members, the publishers of Slash fanzine, and with the punks who made up their audience, the film offers a look into a subculture that was largely ignored by the rock music press of the time.

The promotional poster for The Decline, and the record cover of the soundtrack album, featured a close-up frame of Germs singer Darby Crash lying on stage with his eyes closed. Crash died from a heroin-induced suicide before the film was released. The poster was designed before his death.

Bands included are Black Flag, Germs, X, Alice Bag Band, the Circle Jerks, Catholic Discipline, and Fear. The Germs' performance was replicated in the 2007 Darby Crash biopic What We Do Is Secret.

== Performances ==
- Alice Bag Band (Alice Bag, Craig Lee, Rob Ritter, Terry Graham)
  - "Gluttony"
  - "Prowlers in the Night"
- Black Flag (Ron Reyes, Greg Ginn, Chuck Dukowski, Robo)
  - "Depression"
  - "Revenge"
  - "White Minority"
- Circle Jerks (Keith Morris, Greg Hetson, Roger Rogerson, Lucky Lehrer)
  - "Back Against the Wall"
  - "Beverly Hills"
  - "I Just Want Some Skank"
  - "Red Tape"
  - "Wasted"
- Catholic Discipline (Claude Bessy, Phranc, Robert Lopez, Rick Jaffe, Craig Lee)
  - "Barbee Doll Lust"
  - "Underground Babylon"
- Fear (Lee Ving, Philo Cramer, Derf Scratch, Spit Stix)
  - "Beef Bologna"
  - "I Don't Care About You"
  - "I Love Livin' in the City"
  - "Let's Have a War"
  - "Fear Anthem"
- Germs (Darby Crash, Pat Smear, Lorna Doom, Don Bolles)
  - "Manimal"
  - "Shutdown"
  - "Richie Dagger's Crime"
- X (Exene Cervenka, Billy Zoom, John Doe, D. J. Bonebrake)
  - "Beyond and Back"
  - "Johnny Hit and Run Paulene"
  - "Nausea"
  - "Unheard Music"
  - "We're Desperate"
  - "Sex and Dying in High Society"

== Soundtrack ==
The Decline of Western Civilization

Soundtrack album by various artists
- Released: December 1980
- Genres: Punk rock; hardcore punk
- Length: 37:31
- Label: Slash
- Producers: Gary Hirstius; Alan Kutner

Professional ratings
Review scores
Source	Rating
AllMusic	4.5/5 stars

In December 1980, the soundtrack was released by Slash Records on LP. In the late 1990s it was released on CD. Germs singer Darby Crash appears on the soundtrack album cover. He died shortly before the film was released. The promotional images for the film and album release were designed before his death.

No.	Title	Writer(s)	Artist	Length
1.	"White Minority"	Greg Ginn	Black Flag	2:27
2.	"Depression"	Ginn	Black Flag	2:23
3.	"Revenge"	Ginn	Black Flag	1:31
4.	"Manimal"	Darby Crash	Germs	2:57
5.	"Underground Babylon"		Catholic Discipline	3:41
6.	"Beyond and Back"	John Doe, Exene Cervenka	X	2:54
7.	"Johnny Hit and Run Paulene"	Doe, Cervenka	X	2:49
8.	"We're Desperate"	Doe, Cervenka	X	2:45
9.	"Red Tape"	Keith Morris, Greg Hetson	Circle Jerks	1:42
10.	"Back Against the Wall"	Morris, Hetson, Roger Rogerson, Lucky Lehrer	Circle Jerks	1:33
11.	"I Just Want Some Skank"	Morris, Hetson, Rogerson, Lehrer	Circle Jerks	1:15
12.	"Beverly Hills"	Morris, Rogerson	Circle Jerks	1:15
13.	"Gluttony"		Alice Bag Band	3:45
14.	"I Don't Care About You"	Lee Ving	Fear	3:45
15.	"I Love Livin' in the City"	Ving	Fear	2:16
16.	"Fear Anthem"	Ving / Key	Fear	0:33

== See also ==
- List of cult films
