= The Record (Fear album) =

1982 studio album by Fear

Studio album by Fear
- Released: May 16, 1982
- Recorded: December 1981
- Studio: Sound City Studios, Los Angeles, California
- Genre: Hardcore punk
- Length: 27:03
- Label: Slash
- Producer: Gary Lubow

Fear chronology
The Record (1982)	More Beer (1985)

Singles from The Record
- 1. "I Love Livin' in the City" Released: June 1978

The Record is the debut studio album by the American hardcore punk band Fear, released on May 16, 1982, by Slash Records. It was produced by Gary Lubow. The album was reissued on CD in 1991 with the single "Fuck Christmas" as a bonus track. The band re-recorded the album in its entirety and released it under the title The Fear Record in 2012.

== Reception ==
Professional ratings
Review scores
Source	Rating
AllMusic	4.5/5 stars
Record Collector	5/5 stars
The Village Voice	C+

The album has been regarded as Fear's best album and as a classic album of the 1980s Los Angeles hardcore punk scene. It has received mostly positive reviews, with Mark Deming of AllMusic rating the album 4.5 out of 5 stars and stating that it "makes sense that John Belushi was a big fan of Fear, because The Record sounds like the punk equivalent of the movie Animal House -- puerile, offensive, and often reveling in its own ignorance, but pretty entertaining on a non-think level while it lasts". He also stated that Fear had a "fairly unique perspective -- they seemingly embraced punk as an efficient way to piss off everyone around them, and there's no arguing that they achieved their goals with flying colors on their first and best album, The Record". Record Collector's Mark Rigby called it "probably the most exciting and impressive, one-dimensional, ill-mannered, distasteful, odious 'hate' record ever made".

== Legacy ==
Kurt Cobain listed it in his top 50 albums of all time.

Vocalist/rhythm guitarist Lee Ving was interviewed about the original album's recording in Dave Grohl's 2013 documentary film Sound City.

Guns N' Roses bassist Duff McKagan picked the song "We Destroy the Family" for his 2016 list "The 10 Best Punk Songs" and said, "Fear's debut album The Record still gets played backstage before I go on".

"Let's Have a War" was included on the Repo Man soundtrack album and covered by Sacred Reich on their "Independent" album. Later covered by A Perfect Circle on the album eMOTIVe. It was also covered by Course of Empire on the Infested EP and by Poster Children on their On the Offensive EP.

== Track listing ==
All tracks are written by Lee Ving, except where noted.

Side one
No.	Title	Length
1.	"Let's Have a War" (written by Ving and Philo Cramer)	2:19
2.	"Beef Bologna"	1:47
3.	"Camarillo" (written by Ving and Cramer)	1:11
4.	"I Don't Care About You"	1:59
5.	"New York's Alright If You Like Saxophones"	2:08
6.	"Gimme Some Action"	0:59
7.	"Foreign Policy"	2:14

Side two
No.	Title	Length
8.	"We Destroy the Family" (written by Ving and Cramer)	1:54
9.	"I Love Livin' in the City"	2:05
10.	"Disconnected"	2:07
11.	"We Gotta Get Out of This Place" (written by Barry Mann and Cynthia Weil; originally performed by the Animals)
12.	"Fresh Flesh" (written by Ving and Derf Scratch)	1:44
13.	"Getting the Brush" (written by Scratch)	2:32
14.	"No More Nothing"	1:31
Total length:		27:03

CD reissue bonus track
No.	Title	Length
15.	"Fuck Christmas" (written by Cramer; from the "Fuck Christmas" single)	0:44

== The Fear Record ==
The Fear Record

Studio album by Fear
- Released: November 6, 2012
- Recorded: June 2012
- Genre: Hardcore punk
- Length: 27:21
- Label: The End
- Producer: Fear

Fear chronology
American Beer (2000)	The Fear Record (2012)	For Right And Order (2023)

Professional ratings
Review scores
Source	Rating
AllMusic	2.5/5 stars

In June 2012, a new lineup of Fear re-recorded The Record in its entirety. With a slightly altered track sequence, it was released by The End Records on November 6, 2012. Due to the sexism of songs such as "Beef Boloney" and the homophobia of the song "New York's Alright If You Like Saxophones", certain lyrics were altered for the remakes. The re-recorded album received mostly negative reviews from critics and fans alike. Jason Lymangrover of AllMusic rated it 2.5 out of 5 stars and stated: "The reason why this was made is a complete mystery. The '80s version is obviously the way to go. It's a perfect snapshot of the snottiest band of the punk movement baiting everyone and everything around them". He also said that "finances played into the band disbanding before, so there is a good chance that this version was devised as a way to cash in. Even if the reasons are more innocent, and Ving believed that his time spent playing the guitar parts live for three decades would help him update his masterpiece, times have changed".

=== Track listing ===
All tracks are written by Ving, except where noted.

Side one
No.	Title	Length
1.	"I Love Livin' in the City"	2:01
2.	"New York's Alright If You Like Saxophones"	2:23
3.	"I Don't Care About You"	1:50
4.	"Let's Have a War" (written by Ving and Cramer)	2:22
5.	"Gimme Some Action"	1:01
6.	"Foreign Policy"	0:59
7.	"Beef Boloney"	2:09
8.	"We Destroy the Family" (written by Ving and Cramer)	1:52
9.	"Camarillo" (written by Ving and Cramer)	1:09
10.	"Disconnected"	2:08
11.	"We Got to Get Out of This Place" (written by Mann and Weil; originally performed by the Animals)	2:38
12.	"Fresh Flesh" (written by Ving and Scratch)	1:44
13.	"Getting the Brush" (written by Scratch)	2:32
14.	"No More Nothing"	1:31
Total length:		27:21

== Personnel ==
=== Original version ===
- Lee Ving – lead vocals, rhythm guitar, bass on "New York's Alright If You Like Saxophones"
- Philo Cramer – lead guitar, backing vocals
- Derf Scratch – bass, backing vocals, saxophone, rhythm guitar on "New York's Alright If You Like Saxophones", lead vocals on "Getting the Brush"
- Spit Stix – drums

Production

- Gary Lubow – producer
- Bruce Barris – engineer
- Geza X – mixing
- Greg Lee – mastering
- Barbara Biro Ving – photography

=== Re-recording ===
- Lee Ving – lead vocals, rhythm guitar
- Dave Stark – lead guitar, backing vocals
- Paul Lerma – bass, backing vocals
- Andrew Jaimez – drums

Additional performers

- David Urquitti – saxophone on "New York's Alright If You Like Saxophones"

Production

- Fear – producers
- John Lousteau, Andrew Jamiez – engineers
- Bill Stevenson – mixing
- Jason Livermore – mastering
- Cynthia Correl – photography
