= Mark Vallen =

American cartoonist

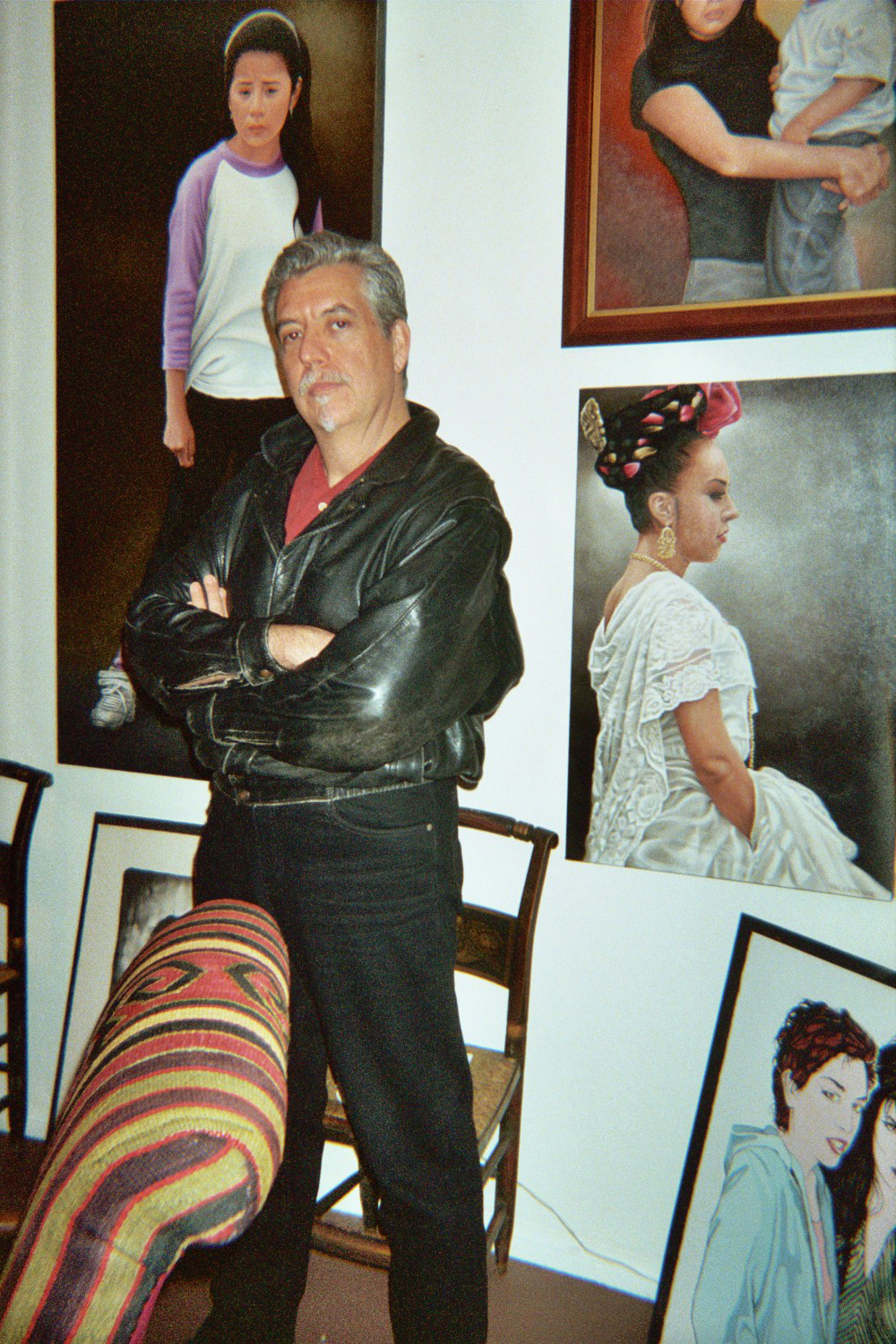
- Mark Vallen at an exhibition in Eagle Rock, California, December 2005
- Born: 1953 (age 72–73); Los Angeles, California, U.S.
- Education: Otis Parsons Art Institute
- Known for: figurative realist painter, blogger
- Notable work: Nuclear War?! ... There goes my career!

Mark Vallen (born 1953) is an American activist with Chicano and other issues, curator, figurative realist painter, and blogger, who runs the Art for a Change web site; he founded The Black Moon web site for Japanese culture.

== Life and work ==
Mark Vallen was born and raised in Los Angeles, California. He studied art at the Otis Parsons Art Institute and was influenced by the African American artist, Charles White, but considers himself largely self-taught, with influences from Goya, Daumier, German Expressionists and Mexican Muralists.

By the age of 17, his cartoons had been published in the Los Angeles Free Press and the Black Panther Party newspaper, and he had printed a (pre-Watergate) street poster, proclaiming, "Evict Nixon!". He worked on Slash, and produced art work based on the early punk scene. He participated in Penelope Spheeris' punk rock documentary The Decline of Western Civilization (1981). At the end of the 1970s and into the early 1980s, Vallen was involved in the Los Angeles Punk scene and the civil rights movement. He advocated for the neglected Central American refugee community, and was the first person to distribute on the streets of Los Angeles political posters in support of that community. These posters used his artwork with bilingual text (the latter a practice derived from the 1960 Chicano Arts movement). In 2001 he gave the International Workers' Association the right to use his image and poster Ningun ser Humano es Illegal (No human being is illegal).

Paul Von Blum said in the Journal of American Studies of Turkey:

A key figure in Southern Californian socially conscious art is Los Angeles-based Mark Vallen, a renowned Chicano artist-activist whose works have addressed pressing social and political issues for more than three decades.

I Am Not the Enemy, pencil drawing by Mark Vallen

Vallen is a figurative realist painter. Much of his work documents California's labor movements, depicting their "dignity and struggle". As a response to racial profiling after the September 11 attacks on the World Trade Center, Vallen made a pencil drawing of a Muslim woman, titled I Am Not the Enemy; prompted by the Iraq war, he reproduced the drawing as a poster for wide distribution, with the title at the bottom in bold upper case. He deplored the increase of racial hate crimes following 9/11 and stated, "Moslems, Arabs, and people of Middle Eastern descent are not the enemy. Many people from the Middle East have come to the United States to escape repression, terror, and war. The fact that these innocent people would now be targeted by misguided Americans is a cause for great shame."

Vallen's art was in the traveling show at UCLA Fowler Museum of Cultural History, the Oakland Museum of California, the Merced Multicultural Arts Center, the Crocker Art Museum, the Jersey City Museum, and Galería de la Raza; his art was in the opening show at the Kantor Gallery, and in the exhibition At Work: The Art of California Labor at Pico House gallery; a solo retrospective, More Than A Witness was at the A Shenere Velt Gallery, Los Angeles. He was included in the show Fundamental (addressing religious fundamentalism) in Manchester in 2007.

Nuclear War?! ... There goes my career!, poster by Mark Vallen, 1980

Vallen was inspired to create Nuclear War?! There Goes My Career! after the election of Ronald Reagan in the fall of 1980. Still some years before Robbie Conal gained fame for his scathing caricatures of Reagan, Vallen's piece appealed not only to the aesthetics but the pragmatics of activism in Los Angeles. Vallen modeled his figure in part on Wonder Woman, and with its obvious nod to Lichtenstein's pop art, his piece was both aesthetically familiar and initially non-threatening to the viewer. The deceptively brief text undercut the familiarity of the image with a deeply ironic commentary on the priorities of the average American citizen. It offered a grim view of American complacency in the face of the nuclear threat.

Both Nuclear War?! There Goes My Career! (1980) — a front cover graphic for LA Weekly — and We're Number One (1984) were shown as part of the Yo! What Happened to Peace? traveling exhibition, whose venues included the Los Angeles Transport Gallery and the Parco Museum in Tokyo in 2005. Two of his prints, including Nuclear War?! There Goes My Career!, were included in an exhibition of political poster art at the Museum of Modern Art.

Vallen's illustrative work includes Slash magazine, the LA Weekly, LA Reader, California Magazine, The Progressive, Mother Jones, and South End Press,. It has frequently been used for the cover of the Santa Monica Review. His art is in the book, Just Another Poster? Chicano Graphic Arts in California. He contributes art to the web site Xispas, which covers Chicano culture and is edited by the writer, Luis J. Rodriguez. Vallen designed the cover for Rodriguez's poetry book, My Nature Is Hunger, published in 2005.

He lives in North Hollywood.

== Art philosophy ==
He has commented on art:

What I disparage is the postmodernist emphasis on form over content, or process over result — which has led to an imbalance in modern art. As for the question of realism in painting, for years we've been told by art world elites that figurative painting is passé, some have even gone so far as to say "painting is dead." No one is ever taken to task for making such ludicrous remarks, but as an advocate of figurative realism I'm continually accused of being a reactionary who hates modern art and wishes to impose realism upon everyone - which is utter nonsense. My position is that figurative realism has largely been excluded and shunned by the art world in favor of conceptual, performance, video and installation art. In calling for the re-establishment of painting to its former respected position, I'm seeking equilibrium — but I'm not looking for a return to the past. To quote a phrase from the Stuckists, we cannot paint as if space travel, computers, and punk rock never happened. I think painters must also offer exceptional content, so I'm thinking in terms of superior technique coupled with interesting narratives or messages. On a personal level, I have a lot to say to my audience, and figurative realism affords me the best way to make my intentions clearly understood.

He has taken issue with Fred Ross of Art Renewal Center, disagreeing with his Ross's unstinting admiration of the French 19th century Salon artist, William-Adolphe Bouguereau. Vallen admires Bouguereau's technique, but considers he was "imprisoned by his extremely conservative vision of what painting could be". Vallen also stated that Ross and his followers "are not incorrect when noting the follies of modern art, but their total rejection of it is beyond the pale and thoroughly reactionary."

== Web sites ==
In 1997, Vallen founded The Black Moon web site as a forum for anime and Japanese culture.

He now publishes the web site Art for a Change, which promotes the socially transformative role of his own and other artists' work, and acts as a forum and resource facility; he is a "popular arts blogger", In 2004 he campaigned against the threatened closure of the Los Angeles Cultural Affairs Department, calling Mayor James Hahn's budget team "vulgarian accountants and hack bureaucrats" and "gray-suited Philistines." In 2007, he criticised the $25 million BP sponsorship of the Los Angeles County Museum of Art as a blatant PR maneuver, observing that since 2002 BP had paid $125 million in settlements for environmental violations.

== Shows ==
This list is incomplete

- 2006: (curator) Don't Talk About Religion Or Politics: Artists explore the sacred and profane, Avenue 50 Studio, Los Angeles
- 2006: And Now, For Something Newd, Avenue 50 Studio, Los Angeles
- 2006: The New Normalcy, Carlotta's Passion Fine Art
