= Claude Bessy =

Claude Bessy may refer to:

- Claude Bessy (dancer) (1932–2026), Paris Opera Ballet and director of same school
- Claude Bessy (writer) (1945–1999), French writer and Los Angeles punk singer
