= More Beer =

Studio album by Fear
- Released: 1985
- Recorded: 1983–1984
- Genre: Hardcore punk
- Length: 27:14
- Label: Restless
- Producer: Lee Ving

Fear chronology
The Record (1982)	More Beer (1985)	Live...For The Record (1991)

Professional ratings
Review scores
Source	Rating
AllMusic	1.5/5 stars
The Encyclopedia of Popular Music	2/5 stars
The Rolling Stone Album Guide	1/5 stars

More Beer is the second studio album by Fear, released in 1985 (see 1985 in music). Frontman Lee Ving spent over a year producing the album.

== Critical reception ==
The Encyclopedia of Popular Music wrote that More Beer "repeated the debut album's formula, with occasional stylistic variation but little else to recommend it." Trouser Press wrote that the album "belch[es] forth a hops-drenched worldview that could only offend the most humorless knee-jerk liberal — plenty of whom had infiltrated the hardcore movement by the time of the album’s release."

== Track listing ==
All songs by Lee Ving, except where noted.

1. The Mouth Don't Stop (The Trouble with Women Is) (Philo Cramer) – 2:20
2. Responsibility (Spit Stix) – 2:06
3. More Beer – 3:42
4. Hey – 0:42
5. Strangulation - 2:27
6. I Am a Doctor (Cramer) – 2:37
7. Have a Beer with Fear – 1:33
8. Bomb the Russians – 0:50
9. Welcome to the Dust Ward – 3:30
10. Null Detector – 1:48
11. Waiting for the Meat – 3:52

The CD reissue includes the original recordings of "I Love Livin' in the City" and "Now You're Dead" from the band's first single as bonus tracks, but omits the song "Strangulation."

=== 2020 Rerelease ===
All songs by Ving, except where noted. CD 1

1. The Mouth Don't Stop (The Trouble with Women Is) (Cramer) – 2:20
2. Responsibility (Stix) – 2:06
3. More Beer – 3:42
4. Hey – 0:42
5. Strangulation - 2:27
6. I Am a Doctor (Cramer) – 2:37
7. Have a Beer with Fear – 1:33
8. Bomb the Russians – 0:50
9. Welcome to the Dust Ward – 3:30
10. Null Detector – 1:48
11. Waiting for the Meat – 3:52
12. I Am A Doctor (Alternate Version) (Cramer) - 2:35
13. Acid Rain - 1:22
14. Hey (Rough Mix) - 0:42
15. Waiting For The Meat (Rough Mix) - 0:44
16. Bomb The Russians (Rough Mix) - 0:53
17. Strangulation (Rough Mix) - 2:30
18. The Mouth Don't Stop (The Trouble With Women Is) (Rough Mix) (Cramer) - 2:09
19. Responsibility (Rough Mix) (Stix) - 1:42
20. I Am A Doctor (Rough Mix) (Cramer) - 2:36
21. Welcome To The Dust Ward (Rough Mix) - 2:47
22. Null Detector (Rough Mix) - 1:47
23. Chicken Song (Alternate Version) - 0:44

CD 2 - 2020 Remixes

1. The Mouth Don't Stop (The Trouble With Women Is) (Cramer) - 2:08
2. Responsibility (Stix) - 2:07
3. More Beer - 2:54
4. Hey - 0:43
5. Strangulation - 2:30
6. I Am A Doctor (Cramer) - 2:37
7. Have A Beer With Fear - 1:40
8. Bomb The Russians - 0:50
9. Welcome To The Dust Ward - 2:49
10. Null Detector - 1:22
11. Waiting For The Meat - 0:48

Digital versions add the song "Abooga Matches" after track 11 on CD 1 and remixes of tracks "Abooga Matches" and "Chicken Song" after tracks 7 and 9 on CD 2

== Personnel ==
- Lee Ving: lead vocals, rhythm guitar, harmonica
- Philo Cramer: lead guitar, backing vocals
- Lorenzo Buhne: bass
- Spit Stix: drums

== In other media ==
The opening track, "The Mouth Don't Stop (The Trouble with Women Is)," is included on the 2013 soundtrack for Grand Theft Auto V as part of the playlist for the in-game radio station Channel X.
