= Have Another Beer with Fear =

Studio album by Fear
- Released: October 17, 1995
- Recorded: 1995
- Genre: Hardcore punk
- Length: 30:50
- Label: Sector 2
- Producer: Fear, Ron Goudie, Fred Remmert

Fear chronology
Live...For the Record (1991)	Have Another Beer with Fear (1995)	American Beer (2000)

Professional ratings
Review scores
Source	Rating
AllMusic	1.5/5 stars

Have Another Beer with Fear is the third studio album by American punk band Fear, released in 1995. Although Lee Ving was the only remaining original member at the time of recording, the album contains a number of tracks written by previous original members. Many of the songs were written and played during the band's brief 1992 reunion tour.

== Track listing ==
All songs by Lee Ving, except where noted.

No.	Title	Length
1.	"U.S.A."	2:17
2.	"I Believe I'll Have Another Beer"	2:49
3.	"Back Into Battle Again"	1:17
4.	"Demons Stickin Pitchforks in My Brain"	2:43
5.	"Bad Day" (Ving, Steven Rutledge)	1:16
6.	"Ugly as You" (Philo Cramer)	2:49
7.	"Legalize Drugs"	1:28
8.	"Drink Some Beer"	2:04
9.	"F-You Let's Rodeo"	1:47
10.	"Beerfight"	2:15
11.	"Chaos"	1:51
12.	"Honor and Obey"	2:03
13.	"Untermenschen"	1:31
14.	"Meat and Potatoes"	1:13
15.	"Public Hangings"	1:45
16.	"Free Beer"	1:34

== Personnel ==
- Lee Ving – vocals, guitar
- Sean Cruse – guitar, vocals
- Scott Thunes – bass
- Andrew Jaimez – drums
