= Slash (fanzine) =

American punk music zine (1977–1980)

- Cover of the October 1977 issue, featuring Debbie Harry
- Formation: 1977
- Dissolved: 1980
- Type: Punk music fanzine
- Headquarters: Los Angeles, California, United States

Slash was a punk rock-related fanzine published by Steve Samiof and Melanie Nissen in the United States from 1977 to 1980. The magazine was a large-format tabloid focused on the Los Angeles punk scene. The fanzine also gave birth to Slash Records, an important punk record label.

== Description ==
Slash regularly covered such L.A. bands as the Screamers, the Skulls, Nervous Gender, the Bags, and X. It did not restrict itself to local acts; its first cover featured Dave Vanian of the Damned. It also featured articles and reviews on reggae, blues, and rockabilly, and in doing so introduced punk audiences to a wide range of then-unfamiliar musical genres.

Writers Claude "Kickboy Face" Bessy, Craig Lee, Richard Meltzer, Jeffrey Lee Pierce, Chris D., Allan MacDonell and Pleasant Gehman, and cartoonist Gary Panter were among the major contributors. Photo contributors included David Arnoff, Susan Carson, Kerry Colonna, Ed Colver, Diane Gamboa, Frank Gargani, Jenny Lens, Melanie Nissen, Donna Santisi, Ann Summa, Scott Lindgren, and coeditor Philomena Winstanley.

== Closing ==
Slash magazine folded in 1980, as many of the main principals involved were increasingly concentrating on other activities. Bob Biggs was more involved in running the label; many of the writers were concentrating on their own musical activities. In addition, there was a widespread perception that punk rock was dying, as movements such as post-punk, hardcore, and deathrock were emerging while many of the original Los Angeles punk bands (such as the Germs and the Weirdos) were breaking up, and in such a changing environment Slash had essentially served its purpose.

== Issues ==
Volume	Issue	Date	Cover subject	Cover by	Notes
1	1	May 1977	Dave Vanian (the Damned)	Photo by Melanie Nissen	
1	2	Jun 1977	John Denney (The Weirdos)	Photo by Melanie Nissen	
1	3	Aug 1977	Johnny Rotten (Sex Pistols)		
1	4	Sep 1977	Kerry Colonna (live collage)	Photo by Philomena Winstanley	
1	5	Oct 1977	Debbie Harry (Blondie)		
1	6	Dec 1977	Exene Cervenka (X)		
1	7	Jan 1978	Local Scene Makers		
1	8	Feb 1978	Poly Styrene (X-Ray Spex)	Photo by Virginia Turbett	
1	9	Apr 1978	Bobby Pyn/Darby Crash		
1	10	May 1978	Alice Bag (Bags)		
—	—	—	Collage of prior issue covers		Unnumbered one-year anniversary issue. Free. No date or volume number.
1	11	Jul 1978	Spazz Attack		
1	12	Aug 1978	The Screamers	Photo by Melanie Nissen	
2	1	Sep 1978	Peter Tosh		
2	2	Nov 1978	Siouxsie and the Banshees	Photo by Stevenson	
2	3	Jan 1979		Drawing by John Van Hamersveld	
2	4	Mar 1979	The Cramps	Photo by Melanie Nissen	
2	5	May 1979	Rasta	Illustration by Rick Monzon	
2	6	Jun 1979	The Alleycats	Photo by Melanie Nissen	
2	7	Aug 1979	"Jimbo"	Drawing by Gary Panter	
2	8	Sep 1979	David Thomas (Pere Ubu)	Photo by Melanie Nissen	
2	9	Oct 1979	Su Tissue (Suburban Lawns)	Illustration by Mark Vallen	
2	10	Nov 1979	David Byrne (Talking Heads)	Photo by Kerry Colonna	
2	11	Dec 1979	James Chance	Illustration by Mike Fink	
3	1	Jan/Feb 1980	Lee Ving (Fear)		
3	2	Mar 1980	Winston Rodney (Burning Spear)	Photo by Scott Lindgren	
3	3	Apr 1980	Malcolm McLaren and Johnny Rotten	Illustration by Bob Biggs	
3	4	May 1980	Johanna Went	Photo by Scott Lindgren	
3	5	Summer 1980	Hardcore punk	Illustration by Mark Vallen	Final issue
