= Philo Cramer =

American musician

- Born: United States
- Genre: Hardcore punk • punk rock • art punk
- Instrument: Guitar

Philo Cramer is an American musician best known as the lead guitarist for the Los Angeles punk band FEAR (Slash Records), from 1978 to 1993. He was a member of the band's classic lineup along with Spit Stix, Derf Scratch and frontman Lee Ving. He rejoined the group in 2018.

== Early life ==
Hailing from Canoga Park, California, he graduated from the University of California, Los Angeles with a bachelor's degree in physics.

== Career ==
Aside from FEAR, he was also in the art punk band The Cigarettes (Carlysle Records) from 1978 to 1979.

With FEAR, he appeared in Penelope Spheeris' documentary, The Decline of Western Civilization and played on their first two albums, The Record (1982) and More Beer (1985). FEAR performed "Beef Bologna", "New York's Alright If You Like Saxophones", and "Let's Have A War" on Saturday Night Live on October 31, 1981, with Cramer wearing a green dress; he also gave dollar bills to people in the crowd saying "I'll give you a dollar if you be my friend". FEAR was cut short to commercial on "Let's Have A War" because people in the crowd starting yelling "New York Sucks". Minor Threat's Ian Mackaye can be heard screaming the phrase shortly after the song "New York's Alright if You Like Saxophones". Lee Ving was the only original member of FEAR for many years; Cramer and drummer Spit Stix left in 1993, but returned in 2018 (according to the FEAR Facebook page).

Cramer also appeared in the movie Get Crazy as a band member. Briefly, in 1985, he formed a band with Agression drummer Mark Aber called King M'butu, also notable for containing Danny Dorman of Wasted Youth and Circle One. Cramer resides in Connecticut and plays in a band called The Fighting Cocks and occasionally plays FEAR cover songs with Connecticut post-punk group Red Temples.
