= I Love Livin' in the City =

Single by Fear
- B-side: "Now You're Dead"
- Released: 1978
- Recorded: 1977
- Genre: Punk rock
- Length: 2:05
- Label: Criminal
- Songwriter(s): Lee Ving
- Producer(s): Fear

Fear singles chronology
"I Love Livin' in the City" (1978)	"'Fuck Christmas'" (1982)

"I Love Livin' in the City" is the first single by the punk rock band Fear. It was originally released in 1978 on the Los Angeles-based Criminal Records.

== Background ==
"I Love Livin' in the City" was re-recorded twice: once during the group's unreleased 1979 sessions, and again for its debut album, The Record. The song exaggeratedly describes a stereotypical, turbulent life one may face in Los Angeles, where blood and corpses litter the street. The B-side, "Now You're Dead", details John F. Kennedy's assassination and the resulting conspiracy theories.

== In popular culture ==
"I Love Livin' in the City" was featured in the 1998 movie SLC Punk! as well as two video game soundtracks, Tony Hawk's Underground 2 (2004) and The Warriors (2005). "M.O.D" covered the song on their "Gross Misconduct" album.

== Legacy ==
University of Southern California film professor David E. James has cited this song as a paradigm of punk's "style that would always be in the process of pushing itself over into self-parody", and he compared its imagery to the work of Charles Bukowski. Oregon State University film studies professor Jon Lewis said the lyrics exemplified punk's perception of "the aesthetics of ugliness that characterize downtown LA". A 2001 Spin magazine retrospective about the L.A. punk scene found it to be "a virtual prototype for the reality-of-my-surroundings gangsta rap of the late '80s."

== Track listing ==
A) "I Love Livin' in the City" (1:54)
B) "Now You're Dead" (2:00)

=== 2021 CD Reissue ===
1. "I Love Livin' in the City" (2:11)
2. "Now You're Dead" (2:05)
3. "Do Me Some Damage" (2:46)
4. "No More Nothing" (2:29)

== Personnel ==
- Lee Ving – vocals
- Burt Good – guitar
- Derf Scratch – bass, vocals
- Johnny Backbeat – drums
