= Graciasland =

Studio album by El Vez
- Released: 1994
- Genre: Rock and roll
- Label: Sympathy for the Record Industry
- Producer: El Vez

El Vez chronology
Fun in Español (1994)	Graciasland (1994)	Merry MeX-mas (1994)

Graciasland is an album by the American musician El Vez, released in 1994. Often labeled as parody rock, the album addresses issues related to Mexico, immigration, and Chicano culture.

== Production ==
The album was produced by El Vez. He recorded it with his band, the Mexican Mariachis, and his backup singers, the Elvettes.

"Aztlan" is a reimaging of Paul Simon's "Graceland", with the Rio Grande used instead of the Mississippi; Graciasland's album cover also sends up Graceland. "Immigration Time" is a takeoff of "Suspicious Minds" that also incorporates elements of "Sympathy for the Devil". "Hurarches Azules" is an interpretation of "Blue Suede Shoes".

== Critical reception ==
Professional ratings
Review scores
Source	Rating
AllMusic	4.5/5 stars
MusicHound Rock: The Essential Album Guide	4.5/5 stars

The Chicago Reader wrote that El Vez "combines one part Elvis with one part bilingual and musical puns, then adds dollops of everything from Hendrix to the Clash." The Boston Globe noted that El Vez "shuffles the familiar and Williams Burroughs-like, cuts it up and recontexturalizes it into new, jarring forms, some in English, some in Spanish."

The Press-Telegram called "Immigration Time" "a timely, topical tune sung to the melody of the King's 'Suspicious Minds' with lyrics right outta Prop. 187."

AllMusic wrote that "Graciasland is El Vez's best work, smoothly combining humor, social and political satire, and great rock & roll in one fell swoop." MusicHound Rock: The Essential Album Guide deemed it "his crowning achievement," writing that the musical references "are played neither for parody nor nostalgia, but as legitimate touchstones from our popular history." In 2009, the Iowa City Press-Citizen called the album a "delightfully subversive, post-modern collision of Elvis Presley with his often-unwitting, pan-global spinoffs."

== Track listing ==
No.	Title	Length
1.	"La Negra"
2.	"Hurarches Azules"
3.	"Aztlan"
4.	"Chicanisma"
5.	"¡Go Zapata Go!"
6.	"It's Now or Never"
7.	"Cinco De Mayo (W/Blackbird) Edit."
8.	"Gypsy Queen"
9.	"Trouble"
10.	"The Cuauhtemoc Walk"
11.	"Cesar Chavez"
12.	"Mexican Radio"
13.	"Safe (Baby Let's Play Safe)"
14.	"Immigration Time"
