= Claude Bessy (writer) =

French music writer and singer

- Also known as: Kickboy Face
- Born: 20 June 1945; Normandy, France
- Origin: Los Angeles, California, United States
- Died: 2 October 1999 (aged 54) Barcelona, Spain
- Genres: Punk rock, post-punk
- Occupations: Singer, songwriter, writer, magazine editor, music video producer
- Instrument: Vocals
- Formerly of: Catholic Discipline

Claude Bessy (20 June 1945 – 2 October 1999), also known as Kickboy Face, was a French writer, magazine editor, singer, video producer, and painter. He is noted as an early organizer in the Los Angeles punk scene in the mid-1970s and was involved in the British post-punk scene in the 1980s.

== Biography ==
Bessy was born in Normandy, France. Bessy was kicked out of the Sorbonne after showing up drunk at nine in the morning, brandishing a bottle of brandy, and threatening a teacher. Bessy moved to the US in 1966 and to Los Angeles in 1967. Bessy later left for Afghanistan to "deal" hashish. Bessy later detoxed from methedrine in a French asylum. In 1970 Bessy returned to Los Angeles, finding work first as a busboy in Santa Monica, then as a waiter as well as other jobs, and founded Angeleno Dread, L.A.'s first reggae fanzine.

In May 1977, he helped Steve Samiof launch the monthly punk rock magazine Slash, which he edited until it ceased publication in 1980.

- "FACT 125 Bessy Talks Turkey". Cerysmaticfactory.info. Archived from the original on 29 October 2013. "Christmas video of Factory acts, discussed and presented by Claude Bessy. Short video clips (many excerpted from previous promo vids) include James [live], Section 25, Thick Pigeon, 52nd Street, Quando Quango, The Wake, Kalima, The Jazz Defektors, Stockholm Monsters [live], Durutti Column [live], Marcel King [live], and some of Bessy's work. Other bands mentioned in passing: New Order, Abecedarians, Shark Vegas, Streetlife, A Certain Ratio, Life, The Royal Family and the Poor and Red Turns To. Originally titled Factory Video Hype."

As Kickboy Face (a pen name adopted from, Kick Boy Face a song and album by Prince Jazzbo), Bessy was the lead singer for the band Catholic Discipline, the film The Decline of Western Civilization includes a Bessy interview, and two songs.

"The scene was not fun anymore, so I bailed on L.A. and the USA, never to return, the day Ronald Reagan was elected." — Claude Bessy

Bessy left California in November 1980. moving with his lifelong partner Philomena Winstanley to the U.K. where he landed a job as a press officer at Rough Trade record label. There he championed American groups such as The Gun Club and Panther Burns.

In 1982 Bessy was hired as the resident VJ at The Haçienda in Manchester. He went on to produce music videos and films for The Virgin Prunes, The Fall and William S. Burroughs, and work with Factory Records' Ikon FCL video label, producing a Factory Records Christmas video trailer Bessy Talks Turkey.

Bessy returned to London where he worked for Forbidden Planet and wrote record sleeve notes. He contributed vocals to records by Sonic Youth, Howard Devoto, Wire's Graham Lewis and trumpeter Marc Cunningham.

In 1987 Bessy moved to Barcelona, Spain where he took to painting and earned a living teaching English. He died of lung cancer in 1999.

== Discography ==
- Unanswerable Lust (1988), Luxuria
- Trying To Make It To The End Of The Century (1991)
- The First Letter (1991) Wire
- "Adios Jupiter" (1994) Raeo
- Underground Babylon (2004) Catholic Discipline

== Filmography ==
- "Barbee Doll Lust" – The Decline of Western Civilization (January 19, 1980)
- "Underground Babylon" – The Decline of Western Civilization (January 19, 1980)

== See also ==
- Jenny Lens
