= Derf Scratch =

Derf "Fred" Scratch
- Also known as: Derf
- Born: Frederick Charles Milner III; October 30, 1951; Monmouth, New Jersey
- Died: July 28, 2010 (aged 58) Camarillo, California
- Genres: Punk rock
- Occupation: Bassist
- Instruments: Bass guitar, vocals, saxophone
- Years active: 1976–2010

Frederick Charles Milner III (October 30, 1951 – July 28, 2010), better known by his stage name Derf Scratch, was an American musician, best known as a former member of the punk rock band Fear and its original bass guitarist.

== Career ==
Scratch played bass for Fear since the band's formation in 1977. Scratch met John Belushi during this time in Los Angeles. Belushi loved Fear and was their biggest booster; the two became good friends and abused cocaine together; this period of their lives is well documented in the Bob Woodward book Wired: The Short Life And Fast Times Of John Belushi, a biography of the comedy actor.

Belushi got Fear a guest appearance on Saturday Night Live that essentially ended in a semi-planned melee.

After their Saturday Night Live appearance, they recorded their debut album The Record, now a classic punk album. The Record was the first of its kind and sets itself apart from other punk recordings of that era, in that the production value was incredibly high for this type of recording. The album was recorded and engineered at the same studio that Fleetwood Mac was recording at and was given the same attention and technical talent that was given to this major super group. Scratch not only played bass on most of the record, he played saxophone on the song "New York's Alright If You Like Saxophones" (while lead singer Lee Ving played bass, as they had been doing the song live). Scratch also co-wrote one song with Ving on the album, "Fresh Flesh", and wrote and sang lead vocal on another, "Getting The Brush" which was about his struggle to get his songs put on the album. Derf claimed that Lee would use up all the record space with his songs as 70% of the publishing and royalty proceeds went to the writer of the song, leaving only 30% to split with the rest of the band members. Scratch was also seen with the band in the movie The Decline of Western Civilization and on an episode of Casey Kasem's syndicated America's Top 10 TV show where his band took first place receiving a "Gong" trophy.

Fear hung on until the mid-1980s, eventually breaking up due to the death of the Hollywood punk scene and Ving's increasing interest in acting and performing country music. Lee's unwillingness to share the publishing rights by allowing other members to contribute their songs on any recordings was also a huge source of dissent among the band members. During the punk revival generated by Nirvana in the 1990s, vocalist Lee Ving did one final performance with the original lineup of Fear before putting together a new version of Fear containing no original members other than himself. Lee instead decided to use unknown "hired guns" to perform and record with Fear in order to maintain all the publishing rights and keep the royalties.

Scratch, wishing to concentrate on guitar and saxophone, sold the Fender bass he used on The Record to then-Minutemen bassist Mike Watt. Watt played the instrument on another future punk classic, the 1982 release What Makes A Man Start Fires? His surviving instruments and the saxophone used on the New York's Alright" recording are now in possession of his wife Tammy.

Scratch later resurfaced in several other groups, including groups such as the eponymous Scratch which released a record in Belgium with very limited sales and included the song "About Me" https://myspace.com/derfscratch a fine example of Derf's clever song writing, Derf Scratch and Friends, and The Werewolfs (which also featured Butch Patrick who played as the son in the TV show The Munsters). As a member of The Werewolfs, Scratch was seriously injured in a car accident after a show in Los Angeles.

During the last 5 years of Derf's life he developed an interest in art, he began painting in 1994 alongside of his wife Tammy who was an artist creating original jewelry pieces that she sold under the name Rita Blackwood. Derf produced a series of "Legs" works which he was planning to exhibit, he continued painting up until his death, his wife Tammy is in possession of these works.

== Death ==
Scratch died on July 28, 2010, from liver disease. He was 58 years old. He is survived by his wife of fourteen years, Tammy.

== Personal life ==
The nickname Derf was actually given to him by his parents when he was a child, it is simply Fred spelled backwards, he carried the name practically all his life.

Derf was ostracized from the Saturday Night Live cast as it was suspected that he contributed to John Belushi's death by giving him his first taste of heroin. To make matters worse Derf did an interview with Bob Woodward for the book "Wired" in which he exposed a lot of the rampant drug use in John's circle of friends. On the night John Belushi died, Derf claimed he was looking for John who was late for a Blues Brother's rehearsal which Derf was to attend for the first time as the new bass player.

Scratch met his wife Tammy in 1992 who at the time called herself "Rita Blackwood". They married in 1996. She was a member of Derf Scratch and Friends who played keyboards and sang vocals.

Scratch was a real estate agent who had passed his test during his early days with Fear. He shared a desk with his parents at the realtor and would tell them he was going to look for properties, but would go to Lee Ving's place to brainstorm ideas for the band.
