= Fear (band) =

American punk rock band

FEAR
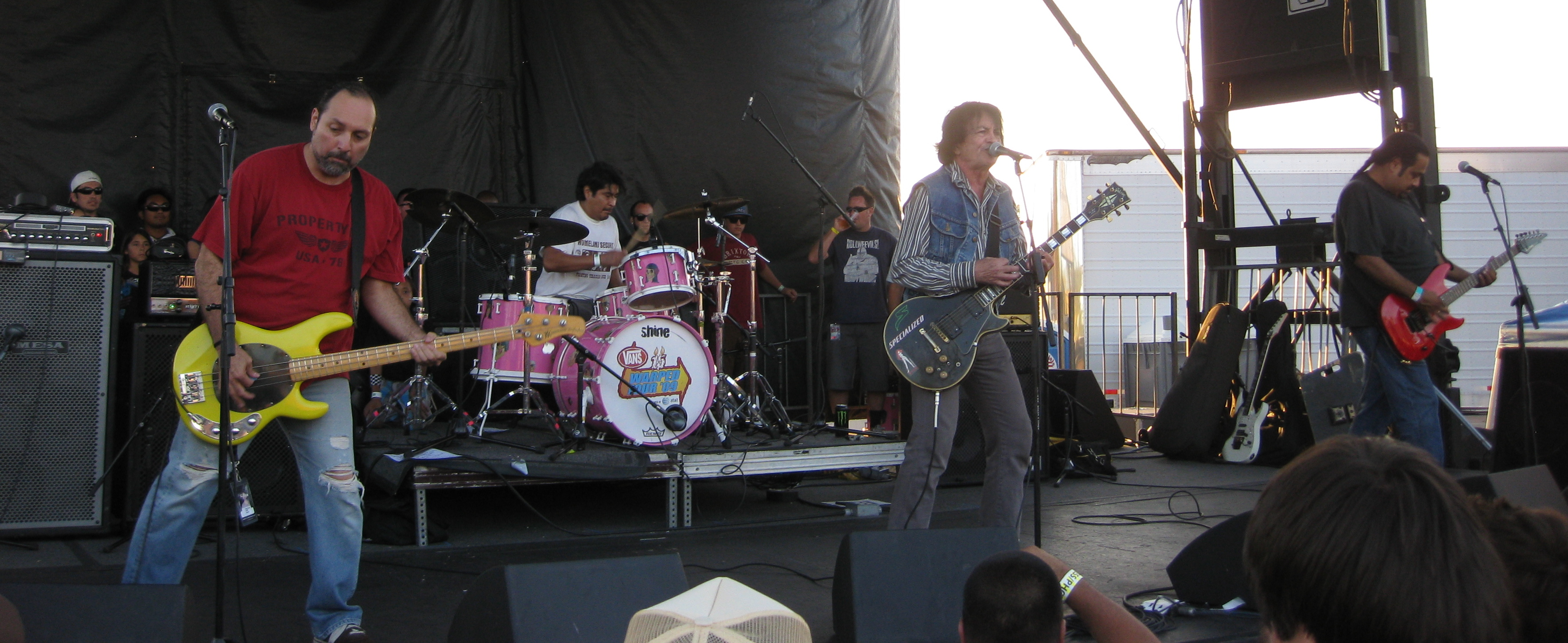
- Fear performing on the 2010 Warped Tour

Background information
- Origin: Los Angeles, California
- Genres: Punk rock; hardcore punk
- Years active: 1977–present
- Labels: Slash, Fear, Sector 2, Atom Age Industries
- Members: Lee Ving; Philo Cramer; Spit Stix; Eric Razo; Amos Cook
- Past members: Derf Scratch; Burt Good; Johnny Backbeat; Eric Feldman; Flea; Lorenzo Buhne; Will MacGregor; Scott Thunes; Kelly LeMieux; Mando Lopez; Sean Cruse; Richard Presley; Derol Caraco; Jeffery “Beldo” Beller; Sam Bolle; Lawrence Arrieta; Andrew Jaimez; Paul Lerma; Dave Stark; Tommy Ufkes; Geoff Kresge; Frank Meyer

Fear, stylized as FEAR, is an American punk rock band from Los Angeles, formed in 1977. The band is credited for helping to shape the sound and style of Californian hardcore punk. The group gained national prominence after an infamous 1981 performance on Saturday Night Live.

Frontman Lee Ving has been the band's only constant member. Since its formation, the band has gone through various lineup changes, and at one point featured Flea, later a member of the Red Hot Chili Peppers, on bass. The classic Fear lineup existed from 1978 to 1982, and was composed of Ving, guitarist Philo Cramer, bassist Derf Scratch, and drummer Spit Stix. Cramer and Stix later rejoined the band in 2018.

== History ==
=== 1970s ===
Fear was formed in 1977 by singer/guitarist Lee Ving and bassist Derf Scratch, who recruited guitarist Burt Good and drummer Johnny Backbeat. According to Scratch, the band was named by photographer Bob Seidemann. In 1978, Fear released the single "I Love Livin' in the City". Shortly after this, Good and Backbeat left the band and were replaced by Philo Cramer and Spit Stix.

=== 1980s ===
Film director Penelope Spheeris met Ving and Stix while they were hanging handbills on telephone poles in Los Angeles on Laurel Canyon Boulevard. After a brief discussion, she asked if they wanted to be in a documentary about the Los Angeles punk scene, The Decline of Western Civilization (1981). In the film, Fear performed a set in which they baited members of the audience with personal attacks, sexist and homophobic slurs, and offbeat humor, inspiring some audience members to come on stage to fight them. At the time, Spheeris was married to Slash Records president Bob Biggs who, later that year, signed a recording deal with Fear.

Actor John Belushi, who became a fan of the band through an episode of L.A.-based New Wave Theatre in 1980, successfully lobbied to get the band a spot as a musical guest on the 1981 Halloween episode of his former show Saturday Night Live. Belushi had originally offered Fear a song on the soundtrack for his final motion picture Neighbors. The film's producers eventually forced Fear off the project, and Belushi got them the infamous SNL gig as compensation. The band's appearance included a group of slamdancers, among them Belushi, Ian MacKaye of Minor Threat and Fugazi, Tesco Vee of the Meatmen, Harley Flanagan and John Joseph of the Cro-Mags, and John Brannon of Negative Approach. The show's director originally wanted to prevent the dancers from participating, so Belushi offered to be in the episode if the dancers were allowed to stay. The end result was the shortening of Fear's appearance on TV. Fear played "I Don't Care About You", "Beef Bologna", "New York's Alright If You Like Saxophones", and started to play "Let's Have a War" when the telecast faded into commercial. They ended "Beef Bologna" by saying, "It's great to be in New Jersey", drawing boos from the live New York audience. The slamdancers left ripe pumpkin remains on the set. Cameras, a piano and other property were damaged. After their SNL appearance, which resulted in $20,000 in damage, some clubs chose not to hire the band. The song originally recorded for the film, also titled "Neighbors", featured vocals from Belushi and Ving, and was eventually released by Ving in 2015.

Fear also appeared in the 1981 rotoscope animated film American Pop, directed by Ralph Bakshi. Ving performed under the name Lee James Jude.

Additionally that year, Josie Cotton released the hit song "Johnny Are You Queer?". The song was based on Fear's song "Fetch Me One More Beer", written by Philo Cramer and John Clancy. Bobby and Larson Paine, who were managing the Go-Go's, re-worked the song with new lyrics and gave it to them, but after a falling out forbade the band from playing it and gave it to Cotton. In several interviews Cotton has suggested that the song's title was lifted from lyrics in the Fear song, though she has also stated that Fear's version of it went "You're a fuckin' queer", which is consistent with Fear's demo of the song.

When Fear found out a variation of their song had become popular, a meeting regarding the publishing rights of the song was arranged between them and the Paines. The two sides decided the winner of a coin toss would get the publishing rights to the song, which the Paines won.

In 1982, Fear released their debut album The Record. After touring in support of the album, Ving fired Scratch, which Scratch later claimed was due to jealousy and Ving taking extra payments without the band's knowledge. Eric Feldman (of Captain Beefheart, Pere Ubu, and later PJ Harvey and Frank Black) briefly filled in on bass before he was replaced by Flea. Flea left the band and was replaced by Lorenzo Buhne. On July 3, 1983, Fear performed at the "Rock Against Reagan" protest concert at the Lincoln Memorial in Washington, D.C. along with the Dead Kennedys, MDC, Toxic Reasons, the Crucifucks and others. In the summer of 1983 through early 1984, while Stix was touring Europe with Nina Hagen, Chuck Biscuits was supposed to replace him, but Stix returned and Biscuits never played any shows with Fear. With Ving producing, the band recorded their second album More Beer in 1985 in just two days, according to the band. However, according to a representative from Enigma Records, it took a full year, as quoted in a March 1986 issue of Spin.

=== 1990s ===
Live...For the Record, a live album of a 1985 performance for Spin Radio, was released in 1991. Shortly afterwards, bassist Will "Sluggo" MacGregor was hired. After 1991–93 North American tours, Fear disbanded. Cramer and Stix left the band, citing disputes with Ving over finances. For the next two years, Ving performed in Austin, Texas as Lee Ving's Army. This eventually became the new Fear lineup, including Ving backed by LVA members Sean Cruse (guitar), Scott Thunes (bass) and Andrew Jaimez (drums). In 1995, Fear released the Have Another Beer with Fear album, followed by American Beer (2000), which featured Ving and Jaimez along with new members Richard Presley and Mando Lopez. The album included new recordings of several previously unreleased older Fear songs, as well as some new compositions. Presley and Lopez then began playing with Kim Deal and Kelley Deal in the Breeders.

=== 2000–present ===
Fear (with Ving as the only original member) performed in the annual Warped Tour in 2008. Former bassist Scratch died from liver disease on July 28, 2010. He was 58 years old.

Fear played the South by Southwest festival in 2012. A re-recording of 1982's The Record was released in late 2012, under the title of The Fear Record. In 2018, the band reunited with Cramer and Stix, and added former AFI bassist Geoff Kresge and Henchmen guitarist Eric Razo to the lineup. In the spring of 2022, Fear announced that they had regained the master rights of The Record from Warner Music and announced a 40th anniversary deluxe edition of the album.

Fear went on tour throughout 2023. On October 31, 2023 Fear released the album For Right and Order. It was their first new studio album in 11 years (and first new studio album of original material in 23 years). The lineup consisted of Ving, Stix, Kresge, and Razo, in addition to songwriting contributions from Cramer.

On October 31, 2025 Fear released their first official music video for their most recent album, The Last Time. The video was shot, edited and directed by notable special makeup effects artist and indie filmmaker, Jim Ojala.

== Band members ==
=== Current ===
- Lee Ving – lead vocals, occasional guitar (1977–present)
- Spit Stix – drums (1977–1993, 2018–present)
- Eric Razo – guitar (2018–present)
- Amos Cook – bass (2024–present)

=== Former ===
- Johnny Backbeat – drums (1977)
- Burt Good – guitar (1977–1978)
- Derf Scratch – bass (1977–1982; died 2010)
- Philo Cramer – guitar (1978–1993, 2018–2024)
- Eric Feldman – bass (1982)
- Flea – bass (1982–1984)
- Lorenzo Buhne – bass (1984–1988)
- Will MacGregor – bass (1988–1993)
- Andrew Jaimez – drums (1993–2018)
- Scott Thunes – bass (1993–1995)
- Sean Cruse – guitar (1993–1999)
- Kelly LeMieux – bass (1995–1997)
- Mando Lopez – bass (1997–2008)
- Richard Presley – guitar (1999–2005)
- Derol Caraco – guitar (2005–2009)
- Jeffery "Beldo" Beller – bass (2008)
- Sam Bolle – bass (2008–2009)
- Lawrence Arrieta – guitar (2009–2010)
- Paul Lerma – bass, backing in vocals (2010–2018)
- Dave Stark – guitar, backing vocals (2011–2018)
- Geoff Kresge – bass (2018–2023)
- Frank Meyer – guitar (2024–2025)

== Discography ==
Studio albums

- The Record (1982, Slash Records)
- More Beer (1985, Restless Records)
- Have Another Beer with Fear (1995, Sector 2 Records)
- American Beer (2000, Hall of Records)
- The Fear Record (2012, The End Records) (rerecorded version of The Record)
- For Right and Order (2023, Atom Age Industries and Fear Records)
- The Last Time (2024)

Singles and EPs

Fuck Christmas

- "I Love Livin' in the City" 7-inch single (1978, Criminal Records)
- Fuck Christmas 7 single (1982, Slash Records): It was recorded during the sessions that produced their debut The Record, but was not released until months later. The single's A-side was later added as a bonus track to the CD reissue of The Record. It is also present on cassette copies of the album. "(Beep) Christmas" is identical to "Fuck Christmas" but with censored profanity, done as a way to promote the single on radio. Punk band Bad Religion covered the song at KROQ Almost Acoustic Christmas in 1993 and 1994
- "Have Yourself a Merry Little Christmas" 7-inch single (2011, The End Records)
- Paradise Studios Sessions Vol. 1 7-inch EP (2014, Atom Age Industries / Fear Records)
- Paradise Studios Sessions Vol. 2 7-inch EP (2015, Atom Age Industries / Fear Records)
- Paradise Studios Sessions Vol. 3 7-inch EP (2016, Atom Age Industries / Fear Records)
- "Neighbors" 7-inch single with John Belushi (2016, Atom Age Industries / Fear Records)
- "Fuel To The Fire / People Person" 7 inch single (Recorded in 1992, released 2019 on Fear Records and Atom Age Industries)
- "Nice Boys (Don't Play Rock & Roll)" EP (2023, Atom Age Industries and Fear Records)
- "Ramblin' Gamblin' Man b/w Brainwash" 7 inch single (2024, Atom Age Industries)
- Trash (A Benefit For David Johansen)" Single (March 2025, Atom Age Industries)
- "A Hard Days Night" streaming single (April 2025, Cleopatra Records)

Live albums

- Live...for the Record (1991, Restless Records)

Soundtrack compilation appearances

- The Decline of Western Civilization (1980, Slash Records)
- Get Crazy (Original Motion Picture Soundtrack) (1983, Morocco Records)
- Repo Man (Music from the Original Motion Picture Soundtrack) (1984, San Andreas Records)
- SLC Punk – Original Soundtrack (1999, Hollywood Records)

== Influence ==
Fear's influence is illustrated by the bands who have paid tribute by covering its songs.

- A Perfect Circle covered "Let's Have a War" on their album eMOTIVe.
- Bad Religion covered "Fuck Christmas", though it was not released. The band also covered "I Don't Care About You" during its May 18, 1998, performance at the TLA in Philadelphia, Pennsylvania.
- Blatz covered "I Don't Care About You" on Shit Split.
- Course of Empire covered "Let's Have a War" as a B-side on their 1993 single "Infested!"
- Rob Crow covered "I Am A Doctor" on his Not Making Any Friends Here... Vol. 1 tour EP.
- Dark Angel covered "I Don't Care About You" on their Live Scars album.
- Demoniac quoted the lyric "Hatred is purity, weakness is disease" from Fear's "Foreign Policy" in the song "Hatred Is Purity".
- Dog Eat Dog covered "More Beer" on their EP If These Are the Good Times.
- From Autumn to Ashes covered "Let's Have a War" for the Tony Hawk's American Wasteland soundtrack released by Vagrant Records.
- Guns N' Roses included "I Don't Care About You" on their 1993 "The Spaghetti Incident?" punk covers album. "Fear's what I would consider one of the only good bands that was around in 1978 in Los Angeles," observed GNR guitarist Slash. "And that record that that song is from [is] one of the only records I had when Guns N' Roses first started. So it's sort like an anthem… Fear was the only band that I really liked. I couldn't really tell you all that much. They were just a bunch of fuckin' rowdies."
- Harvey Milk covered "We Destroy the Family" on their 2008 album Life... The Best Game in Town.
- Indecision covered "I Don't Care About You" and "New York's Alright If You Like Saxophones" on Punk Rock Jukebox Volume 2.
- Megadeth covered "Foreign Policy" on their Dystopia album.
- Method of Destruction (M.O.D.) covered "I Love Livin' in the City" on their Gross Misconduct album.
- Poster Children covered "Let's Have a War" on their On the Offensive CD EP.
- Sacred Reich covered "Let's Have a War" on their A Question EP and "Beef Bologna" on the Japanese version of their album Heal.
- Soundgarden covered "I Don't Care About You", appearing as a B-side on several of their singles.
- Stormtroopers of Death (S.O.D.) covered "I Love Livin' in the City" on their Live at Budokan album.
- The Reatards covered "I Love Livin' in the City" on their album Teenage Hate.
- Turbonegro covered "I Don't Care About You" on their Small Feces box set.
