= Jenny Lens =

American photographer

Jenny Lens is a Los Angeles-based photographer who chronicled the early punk rock scene of New York, Los Angeles, San Francisco and London from August 1976 to June 1980.

== Early life ==
Born and raised in Los Angeles to a Jewish family, Lens grew up loving books and art. She studied Art at the California State University, Northridge earning her Bachelors in Arts, later going on to earn her Masters in Fine Arts at California Institute of the Arts. Not satisfied with contemporary studies in school, Lens pursued studies in art history of the camera and other art movements.

== Career ==
Lens was one of the first photographers to chronicle the early punk rock scene of New York, L.A., and London, and to talk about her success as a woman in the male-dominated field of rock photography. Many of these photos are featured in her book Punk Pioneers. She photographed The Ramones’ first direction in 1976, the scene at the Masque in Los Angeles, the Clash in 1980.
