= Get Crazy =

1983 film by Allan Arkush

- Theatrical release poster
- Directed by: Allan Arkush
- Written by: Danny Opatoshu; Henry Rosenbaum; David Taylor
- Produced by: Hunt Lowry
- Starring: Malcolm McDowell; Allen Garfield; Daniel Stern; Gail Edwards; Miles Chapin
- Cinematography: Thomas Del Ruth
- Edited by: Kent Beyda; Michael Jablow
- Distributed by: Embassy Pictures
- Release date: August 5, 1983
- Running time: 92 minutes
- Country: United States
- Language: English
- Budget: $5.5 million
- Box office: $1.6 million

Get Crazy is a 1983 American musical comedy film directed by Allan Arkush, and starring Malcolm McDowell, Allen Garfield, Daniel Stern, Gail Edwards, and Miles Chapin.

== Plot ==
It is December 31, 1982, and the Saturn Theater is preparing for its big New Year's Eve concert under the direction of owner and master showman Max Wolfe, who has operated the Saturn since 1968. Assisting Max are stage manager Neil Allen, and visiting former stage manager Willy Loman. Also caught up in the wild activity is beleaguered stagehand Joey, temperamental lighting director Violetta, and Neil's younger sister Susie.

Max Wolfe holds a 30-year lease to the theater, but reptilian concert promoter Colin Beverly has other ideas. Beverly offers to buy Max out of his lease with what seems to be a generous deal at Beverly's concert auditorium and stadium, but Max refuses, ultimately becoming so incensed that he collapses of an apparent heart attack. Outside, Max's ingratiating nephew Sammy informs Beverly that he stands to inherit the theater from his uncle, and Beverly offers Sammy the same deal he offered Max—if Sammy can get Max's signature on an agreement to transfer the Saturn's lease before midnight.

The various performers for the show are introduced:

- Captain Cloud and the Rainbow Telegraph—Max Wolfe's favorite band and a spoof of Strawberry Alarm Clock—arriving in an aging bus that is painted à la the Merry Pranksters' Furthur.
- Nada and her 15-member band (a spoof of such girl groups as the Bangles and the Go-Gos) playing an amalgam of many disparate styles of music that appeared on MTV in the early 1980s—part bubble-gum pop, part New Wave, part garage rock. They are joined by "Special Guest Star" Piggy.
- King Blues, the King of the Blues, a spoof of Muddy Waters (and, to a lesser extent, Bo Diddley and B. B. King).
- Auden, "metaphysical folk singer, event of the '70s, [and] antisocial recluse", a spoof of Bob Dylan. Auden, who initially complains of writer's block, is coaxed into appearing by being made to think that Max is close to death, but, after blithely asking a taxi driver to take the "scenic route," he spends the majority of the movie on his cab ride, improvising lyrics for the song he intends to perform.
- Reggie Wanker, "20 years of rock and roll and still on top", a spoof of Mick Jagger; featuring his drummer Toad played by John Densmore of The Doors. Wanker is beset by a general malaise, unable to fully enjoy his lavish situation of easily available women and drugs.

King Blues opens the show, performing two of his "own" hit songs, "The Blues Had a Baby and They Named it Rock and Roll" (by Muddy Waters) and "Hoochie Coochie Man" (by Willie Dixon). Next the Nada Band take the stage and perform "I'm Not Going to Take It No More." Piggy leads the band in a viciously punk-rock version of "Hoochie Coochie Man," complete with stage dives and slam dancing. Reggie sings a celebration of egotism, "Hot Shot," then moves on to his own version of "Hoochie Coochie Man".

As the show proceeds, Sammy tries to find ways to sabotage the theater, including fueling a fire in the basement and cutting the fire hose. Colin Beverly's henchmen, Mark and Marv, give Sammy a bomb, which he plants in the rocket ship that Max will ride during the final countdown to midnight.

Willy overhears Mark and Marv talking about the bomb, and is captured by them and locked in the trunk of Colin Beverly's limousine. She escapes when the limo collides with Auden's taxicab, and runs back toward the theater. Only moments before midnight, Willy reaches the theater and tells Neil about the bomb. As the seconds tick away, the bomb is thrown from person to person out of the building, landing in Colin Beverly's limo just as it pulls up to the curb. The last second ticks away, the bomb explodes, everyone shouts "Happy New Year", and Captain Cloud leads the crowd in "Auld Lang Syne".

Quickly after, the crowd and bands exit the theater, just as Auden finally walks in. Max gives Neil the lease to the theater, saying he intends to retire. Neil offers partnership to Willy. The end credits roll while Auden sings "Little Sister" to the sole remaining patron, Susie. The dedication at the end of the film reads, "Thanks for the memories to the entire staff of the Fillmore East 1968–71."

== Cast ==
- Malcolm McDowell as Reggie Wanker
- Allen Garfield as Max Wolfe (credited as Allen Goorwitz)
- Daniel Stern as Neil Allen
- Gail Edwards as Willy Loman
- Miles Chapin as Sammy Fox
- Ed Begley Jr. as Colin Beverly
- Stacey Nelkin as Susie Allen
- Bill Henderson as "King Blues"
- Lou Reed as Auden
- Howard Kaylan as Captain Cloud
- Lori Eastside as "Nada"
- Lee Ving as "Piggy"
- John Densmore as "Toad"
- Anna Bjorn as Countess Chantamina
- Robert Picardo as Connell O'Connell
- Bobby Sherman as Mark
- Fabian Forte as Marvin "Marv"
- Franklyn Ajaye as "Cool"
- Paul Bartel as Dr. Carver
- Dan Frischman as Joey
- Mary Woronov as Violetta
- Clint Howard as The Head Usher
- Denise Galik as Nurse Gwen
- Linnea Quigley as Groupie (uncredited)
- Jackie Joseph as Susie's Mom
- Dick Miller as Susie's Dad
- Chuck Hanson as Savage Beast
- Susan Saiger as Buffy
- Barry Diamond as Stagehand

== Production ==
Arkush later said that everything based in the film was "based on real stuff, and I wish I could remake it as a realistic movie. But the only way I could get it made at the time was to do the Airplane! version of it. My second film, Heartbeeps (1981), had been a complete failure, and I was desperate to do a movie about something I really knew and cared about." He claims that producer Herbert F. Solow "was pretty much of a jerk. Whatever I’d suggest, he’d counter with another suggestion. It was just the way he was: everything he heard, he said “no” to... but he would take the germ of what you said, and put his own spin on it." In particular, the director claims he wanted to cast Mariska Hargitay, Jerry Orbach and Tom Hanks in the parts ultimately played by Stacey Nelkin, Allen Garfield and Daniel Stern, respectively, but Solow refused.

Concert scenes, as well as exterior shots of the marquee, were filmed at the historic Wiltern Theatre in Los Angeles, California. The theatre had been poorly maintained for years prior to filming, and was about to undergo a major restoration to return it to its former glory. According to Malcolm McDowell, "We trashed it just before they restored it. They knew we were going to do it, so they didn't mind."

All actors performed their own vocal tracks, although none (except Lou Reed) wrote their songs. Malcolm McDowell specifically requested that he be allowed to sing as a condition of his contract.

Director Allan Arkush appears during "Auld Lang Syne", throwing frisbees from the wings while wearing his Fillmore East usher's T-shirt.

A few actors featured in the 1982 film Eating Raoul also appear in Get Crazy, including Paul Bartel, Mary Woronov, Susan Saiger and Ed Begley, Jr. as well as the stunt crew consisting of Bruce Paul Barbour and Rick Seaman.

== Reception ==
Get Crazy was released on August 6, 1983 to mixed reviews. Box office sales were tepid. Its domestic gross totaled US$1,645,711, and its theatrical run was brief.

Arkush said that, "the scam they came up with to release it was to sell the shares in it to some Wall Street tax shelter group, and then put it out so it would lose money… just like The Producers (1968)! So nobody saw it—on purpose! It was so horrible to work so hard on something, and then see it just thrown away. The audiences that saw it didn’t get it. They didn’t understand how there could be a rock concert with all these different kinds of acts. My take on it? It’s a movie with three thousand punch lines, but only a thousand jokes. There’s too much zaniness, and not enough human comedy. It’s just too bizarre."

=== Critical response ===
Janet Maslin of The New York Times called it "hip" and "good-natured" and wrote, "[It] isn't for everyone, but those well-disposed toward rock will find it energetic and funny." The 2021 Get Crazy special edition Blu-ray release was called by critic Peter Sobczynski of RogerEbert.com, "Still as weird and wild as it was when it first came out, this movie is ripe for rediscovery."

== Distribution ==
Embassy Home Entertainment released the film on VHS in 1984. Director Allan Arkush had stated that a DVD release was unlikely, due to issues with the sound elements.

The Embassy Home Entertainment VHS release is a fullscreen transfer using the open matte technique. As a result, the video shows (nearly) the full width of the theatrical release but occasionally reveals overhead boom microphones and other items that would be hidden when projected to a standard 1.85:1 ratio.

Kino Lorber has released the film for the first time on Blu-ray and DVD in December 2021 under a new 2K restoration and a slew of bonus features.

== Soundtrack ==
The soundtrack to the film was released on LP and cassette in 1983 on the Morocco imprint of Motown Records, catalog number 6065CL/CC. "Get Crazy" and "Hot Shot" were released together as a single to promote the album.

US vinyl-LP and cassette

1. "Get Crazy" – Sparks - 3:35
2. "You Can't Make Me" – Lori Eastside & Nada - 3:02
3. "Chop Suey" – The Ramones - 3:55
4. "It's Only a Movie" (a.k.a. "But, But") – Marshall Crenshaw - 2:40
5. "Little Sister" – Lou Reed - 6:09
6. "I'm Not Gonna Take It" – Lori Eastside & Nada - 3:21
7. "Hot Shot" – Malcolm McDowell - 3:18
8. "The Blues Had a Baby and They Named It Rock & Roll" – Bill Henderson - 3:24
9. "Hoochie Coochie Man" – Fear - 2:34
10. "Starscape" – Michael Boddicker - 1:36
11. "Auld Lang Syne" – Howard Kaylan & Cast - 2:36

== See also ==
- List of films set around New Year
