= Spit Stix =

Tim Leitch
- Also known as: Spit Stix
- Born: Timothy John Leitch; 29 December 1955 (age 70); Los Angeles, California
- Genres: Rock, punk rock, drum n bass, world
- Occupations: Producer, musician, composer, actor
- Instruments: Drums, computer

Timothy John Leitch (born December 29, 1955), professionally known as Spit Stix, is an American drummer, producer and songwriter. He gained prominence as drummer for the punk rock band Fear and producer of the first Red Hot Chili Peppers demo tape.

== Early life ==
Timothy John Leitch was born in Los Angeles into a musical family. Both his parents and all his siblings played or performed. At the age of eight, Tim chose drums and began to play Bossa and Jazz. At 12, he began tutoring with Marine drum and bugle corps instructor Don Clark, and speed drummer Deane Hagen (son of film/TV composer Earle Hagen). By 17 he had studied with Joe Pass and Art Pepper, and performed with Ralph Humphries and Don Ellis.

== Musical career ==
Later he joined seminal hardcore LA punk band Fear, performed with avant-garde singer Nina Hagen, Lydia Lunch, John Belushi, LA African Beat Kwashi and Dick Dale. He performed on Saturday Night Live on Halloween 1981.

Leitch learned production, engineering, and songwriting skills from Richie Podler, Bill Cooper, and Bob Clearmountain. He also had some minor roles in movies like American Pop and The Ratings Game In 1983, Tim produced the first Red Hot Chili Peppers demo recording that led the band to its first recording contract. Those sessions were later released in 1994 as “Out in LA”, EMI. Tim had his first top 40 hit with “Paraiso” (WEA Latina artist Chantelle). His credits also include scoring the feature film, Night Eyes II and the film short, “In the Meantime”, as well as ghost-composing many other feature films under Steve “Don’t You Forget About Me” Shift.

After his move to New York City in 1992, Leitch came off the road with FEAR in 1993 and began learning Sonic Solutions and Pro Tools. By 2000, Tim was writing jingles for Bang Music, engineering, producing, licensing, teaching Logic Pro software privately, and demonstrating for software and digital audio hardware manufacturers at trade shows.

In 2003, Tim partnered with Emmy award winning composer Patty Stotter, scoring HBO documentaries and music and sound design for children's books online. Sol-I, Tim's solo projects' debut album, Leap Before You Look, won 1st place at the 2004 Just Plain Folks Independent Music Awards in the category Electronica Album of the Year. Docs Without Borders Film Festival awarded his piece (Is Anybody Listening?) for its 2016 Official Selection in the Human Spirit category. His 13 years of teaching drums was accumulated into his book "Diffusion of Useful Beats" which was released in March of 2019. A collection of beats, fills, and exercises for drum kit. Tim now lives in the Pacific Northwest. Some of his current performing projects include Fear, Nasalrod, and NW Sugar Shakers.
