= Lee Ving =

American guitarist, singer, and actor

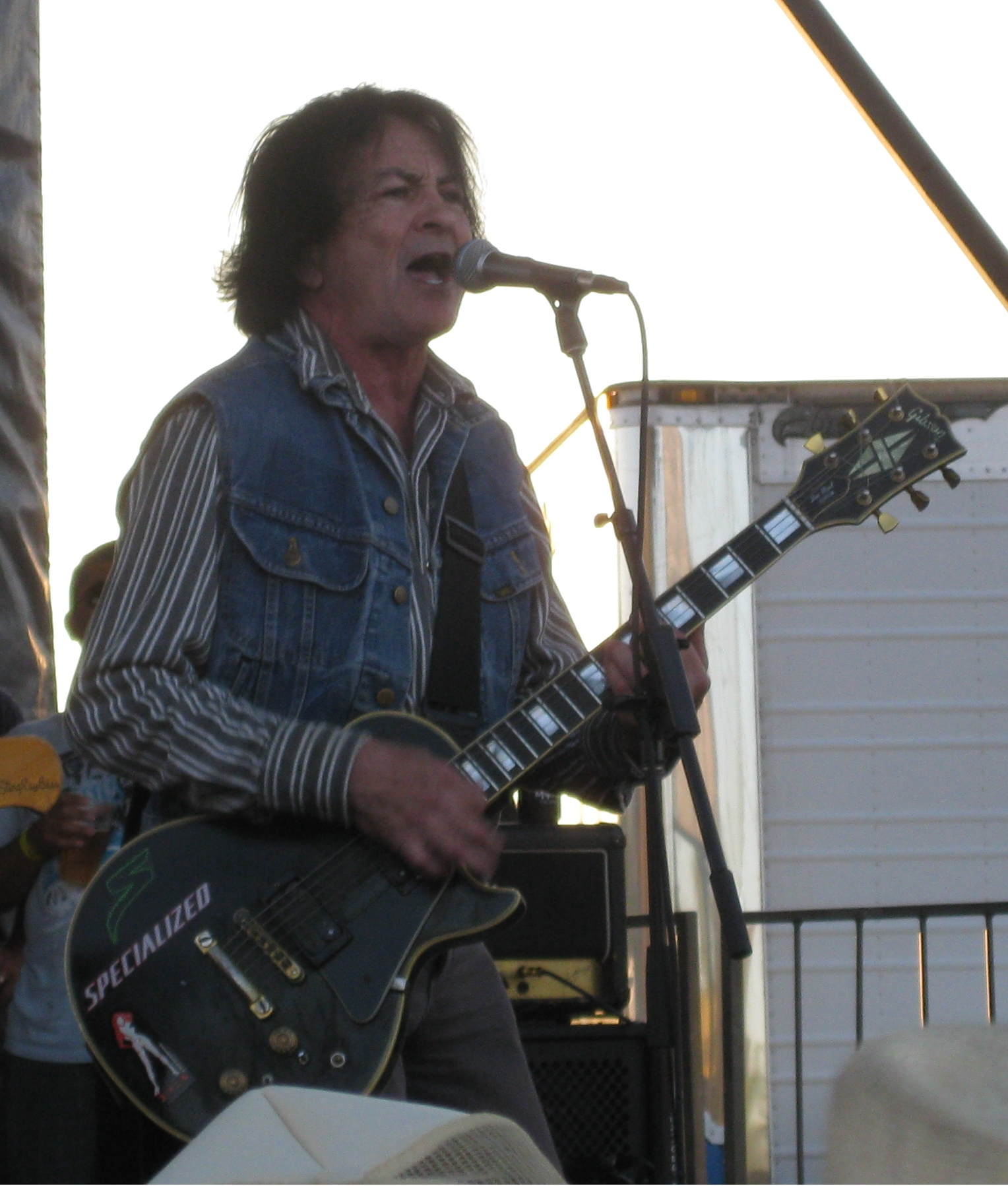
- Ving performing with Fear on the 2010 Warped Tour

Background information
- Born: Lee James Jude Capallero; April 10, 1950 (age 76); Philadelphia, Pennsylvania, U.S.
- Genres: Hardcore punk, blues, country
- Occupations: Musician, actor
- Instruments: Vocals, guitar
- Years active: 1968–present
- Labels: Slash, Fear, Sector 2
- Formerly of: Fear, MD.45, Teenage Time Killers
- Website: fearleeving.com

Lee James Jude Capallero (born April 10, 1950), also known as Lee Ving, is an American guitarist, singer, and actor. Ving is the frontman of the Los Angeles-based hardcore punk band Fear. As an actor, Ving played topless-club owner Johnny C. in Flashdance (1983), motorcycle gang leader Greer in Streets of Fire (1984) and murder victim Mr. Boddy in the murder mystery film Clue (1985). He also played the Installer in the movie The Wild Life (1984) with Christopher Penn.

== Early life ==
Ving was born Lee James Jude Capallero in Philadelphia and grew up in the city's Kensington neighborhood. The Capallero family later moved to the suburbs and Ving attended St. Luke's Elementary School in Glenside as well as St. John of the Cross in Roslyn, before graduating from Abington Senior High School.

Ving's mother taught him to play the mandolin at four years of age. He began studying guitar at age eleven and later studied with musicians Jim Hall and John Abercrombie. He also studied with Ted Greene after moving to Los Angeles. As a teen he listened to blues records and particularly enjoyed their striking guitar sounds. He was also interested in Jimi Hendrix, the Rolling Stones, as well as the experimental New York rock group The Fugs. He joined his first band while still in high school.

In 1966 Ving enlisted in the army and served stateside during the Vietnam War.

== Music career ==
After leaving the army, Ving became involved in Philadelphia's folk, blues and R&B music scenes while studying Sociology at Villanova University. He joined the electric blues band Sweet Stavin Chain (SSC) as a vocalist and harmonica player. SSC frequently collaborated with jazz saxophonist Michael Brecker. The band also opened for The Who at the Electric Factory in 1968 and also opened for Cream at the Spectrum during Cream's farewell tour later that same year. After leaving SSC, Ving moved to New York and studied voice and guitar. In the mid-1970s he moved to Los Angeles, playing briefly with heavy metal bands before forming the hardcore punk band Fear. The band's first concert was in 1978.

Ving is Fear's lead vocalist, rhythm guitarist and harmonica player and is the only member to have remained with the band since its inception. During Fear's performances at the L.A. punk scene, Ving was known for baiting his audience with insults, earning him the nickname "the Don Rickles of rock." Ving's vocals have been described as "bluesy", evoking Howlin' Wolf and Muddy Waters, while also having a "commanding, drill-sergeant vocal delivery and surly attitude helped to build a new breed of bad-tempered hardcore" and "a vein-busting rage that lends [Ving] the air of a loco Marine on a rampage."

1981 marked an important year for Ving and Fear. The band was featured in the documentary The Decline of Western Civilization about Los Angeles's punk scene. Ving was initially approached by the film's director, Penelope Spheeris, while he was posting concert promo flyers to telephone poles in Los Angeles. Spheeris also introduced Fear to her husband Bob Biggs, the founder and then president of Slash Records, who signed the group to his label; Fear released their debut album The Record with the label in 1982.

Fear also appeared on the 1981 Halloween episode of Saturday Night Live (SNL) at the suggestion of SNL writer Michael O'Donoghue and then-SNL cast-member John Belushi. Belushi became a fan of Fear after seeing them perform in 1980 on the L.A.-based music television show New Wave Theatre; O'Donoghue had seen the band in The Decline of Western Civilization. Belushi had initially commissioned the band to record a song for his film Neighbors, but the movie studio rejected the recording and it never made the soundtrack. As a favor to Fear, Belushi and O'Donoghue made a deal with then producer Dick Ebersol whereby Belushi would make a cameo appearance on the show upon condition that Fear be allowed to perform as the episode's musical guests. A large portion of the crowd were punk music fans and included members of the bands Minor Threat, Cro-Mags, The Meatmen, Negative Approach as well as Jesse Malin who rushed the stage and were moshing. One of the slam dancers, Ian MacKaye, yelled "New York Sucks!" which was broadcast live. Dick Ebersol, who was stage manager at the time, decided to cut to tape once the obscenities could be heard.

Fear's performance was initially pulled from subsequent SNL reruns and recorded releases of the episode, but has subsequently been released in an edited form. The New York Post had initially reported that attendees of the performance caused $200,000 worth of damage, however both the Los Angeles Times and Billboard later reported that a program spokesperson confirmed the cost of damages was actually a $40 fine for "labor penalties." Both The Decline of Western Civilization and the Halloween SNL performance were an integral part of the history of hardcore punk, having exposed the music genre to a much wider audience.

Ving's vocals and harmonica playing were featured on the track "Got to Get Out of New York" from saxophonist Tom Scott's 1983 album Target. Fear found it difficult to find clubs willing to let them perform after their SNL performance and the band stopped playing in 1987. That same year Ving formed a country band called Range War that toured California and Texas. Two years later Ving moved with his wife and son to Austin.

Fear re-formed briefly under the band's original lineup in 1993. A couple of years later, Ving fronted an Austin-based band called Lee Ving's Army that later toured under the name Fear and included former Frank Zappa bassist Scott Thunes, drummer Andrew Jaimez and guitarist Sean Cruse.

Ving was also the vocalist for the band MD.45, which also featured Dave Mustaine of Megadeth. The band released their only album The Craving in 1996, however in 2004 the album was remastered and re-released with Mustaine's vocals replacing those of Ving.

Ving appeared in Dave Grohl's 2013 documentary Sound City and is a member of the supergroup Teenage Time Killers that came about due to the film. In 2015 Fear's recordings from the Belushi film Neighbors were recovered by Belushi's widow and Fear's music was re-mastered and re-mixed by Ving at Grohl's 606 studios in Los Angeles. Ving released the music digitally that same year. In an interview with Rolling Stone about Sound City, Grohl stated that Fear's performance in The Decline of Western Civilization inspired him to become a musician and that performing with Ving 30 years later was a "profound, life-altering moment."

== Acting career ==
Ving (credited as Lee James Jude) and the other members of Fear appeared in the 1981 rotoscope animated film American Pop, directed by Ralph Bakshi.

In 1983, Ving appeared in several film roles. He played a murderer in the horror anthology film Nightmares starring Emilio Estevez. He appeared in Flashdance as the owner of a topless club who tries to convince Jennifer Beals' character to work for him. He played the over-the-top punk singer named 'Piggy' in the rock-and-roll comedy Get Crazy.

A year later, Ving played Greer, the henchman of Willem Dafoe's character in the neo-noir rock musical film Streets of Fire and also appeared as a criminal in a police lineup in an episode of the short-lived Three's Company spin-off Three's a Crowd.

In 1985, he played Mr. Boddy in the film Clue, based on the board game of the same name. While the film was unsuccessful in theaters on its first run, it later became a cult classic and it is often the role for which Ving is now most recognized.

In 1987 Ving appeared in the Who's the Boss episode titled "Walk on the Mild Side". Ving played Jake McGuire, a motorcyclist bad boy who Angela dates while fulfilling a list of wild things she wanted to do while in high school. Ving's country band Range War also performed two songs during the episode. Also in 1987, Ving reunited with director Penelope Spheeris for her film Dudes. Ving was cast as the main antagonist, a gang leader who murders one of the protagonists, Milo, portrayed by Flea, bassist of Red Hot Chili Peppers. The plot revolves around the murder victim's friends looking to bring Ving's character to justice.

Ving appeared in a cameo role in the 2009 National Lampoon comedy Endless Bummer. He was also cast as a bartender in Death Rider in the House of Vampires, a Spaghetti Western horror film directed by Glenn Danzig released in 2021.

== Discography ==
=== Fear ===
Guitar and vocals on all.

- The Record (1982)
- More Beer (1985)
- Live...For the Record (1991)
- Have Another Beer with Fear (1995)
- American Beer (2000)
- For Right and Order (2023)
- The Last Time (2024)

=== Range War ===
- Home on the Range (recorded 1985, released 2017) - vocals, guitar

=== MD.45 ===
- The Craving (1995) - vocals, harmonica

=== With Sound City Players ===
- Sound City: Real to Reel (2013) - vocals on "Your Wife Is Calling"

== Filmography ==
Year	Title	Role	Notes
1981	American Pop	Punk Rocker (voice)	Credited as Lee James Jude
1983	Flashdance	Johnny "Johnny C"	
1983	Get Crazy	"Piggy"	
1983	Nightmares	William Henry Glazier	Credited as Lee James Jude
1984	The Wild Life	Installer	
1984	Streets of Fire	Greer	
1984	The Ratings Game AKA The Mogul	Dawn Patrol	TV movie
1985	Clue	Mr. Boddy	
1986	Black Moon Rising	Marvin Ringer	
1986	Oceans of Fire	Pembroke	TV movie
1987	Scenes from the Goldmine	Ian Weymouth	
1987	Dudes	Missoula	
1989	Grave Secrets AKA Silent Screams	Zack	
1990	Masters of Menace	Roy "Roy Boy"	
1991	The Taking of Beverly Hills	Varney	Credited as Lee Ving James
2001	Fast Sofa	Leather Jacket	
2009	Endless Bummer	Hot Rod Guy	
2009	I'm Calling Frank	Frank	Directed by Peter D'Angelo Neil

=== Television appearances ===
Year	Title	Role	Notes
1984	Legmen	Cole	Episode: "Take the Credit and Run"
1984	Fame	Fred	Episode: "The Monster That Devoured Las Vegas"
1985	Streethawk	Virgil Powell	Episode: "Dog Eat Dog"
1985	The New Alfred Hitchcock Presents	Curt Venner	Episode: "Pilot"; segment: "Incident in a Small Jail"
1986	Fast Times	Intimidating Guy	Episode: "The Last Laugh"
1987	Crime Story	Sam Taylor	Episode: "The Battle of Las Vegas"
1987	Who's the Boss?	Jake Maguire	Episode: "Walk on the Mild Side"
1987	Fame	Fred	Episode: "That Was the Weekend That Was"

=== Documentaries ===
Year	Title	Role	Notes
1981	The Decline of Western Civilization	Himself	Documentary about the Los Angeles hardcore punk scene; Ving performs with Fear.
1982	The Slog Movie	Himself	Documentary about the Los Angeles hardcore punk scene; Ving performs with Fear.
2001	25 Years of Punk	Himself	TV documentary; Ving is interviewed about the Los Angeles hardcore punk scene.
2013	Sound City	Himself	Documentary about Sound City Studios; Ving is interviewed about recording The Record at Sound City.
