= Snooper =

Snooper may refer to:

- A device that transmits and receives audio content and allows one or more listeners to listen in on that content
- Snooper and Blabber, one of the sequences from the Quick Draw McGraw Show
- Republic SD-3 Snooper, a U.S. Army reconnaissance drone
- Packet sniffer
- Snõõper, American punk rock band
- Snooper, a strip from the British comic Buster
- Super Snõõper, album by Snõõper
- The Snooper, a pseudonym of journalist Frank Talent
