= Home recording =

Recording made at someone's home

Home recording is the practice of recording sound in a private home instead of a professional recording studio. A studio set up for home recording is called a home studio or project studio. Home recording is widely practiced by voice actors, narrators, singers, musicians, podcast hosts, and documentary makers at all levels of success. The cost of professional audio equipment has dropped steadily as technology advances during the 21st century, while information about recording techniques has become easily available online. These trends have resulted in an increase in the popularity of home recording and a shift in the recording industry toward recording in the home studio.

In 2020, the onset of the COVID-19 lockdowns resulted in a dramatic global increase in the number of remote workers in 2020, as well as home-based recording artists, which also led to the proliferation of internet-based microgenres like bedroom pop and egg punk.

== History ==
=== 1960s–1970s: Origins ===
During the 1950s and 1960s, American musicians such as Les Paul, Hasil Adkins and Frank Zappa, Australian artist Pip Proud and British producer Joe Meek became early pioneers of home recording. Around the same time, the Who's Pete Townshend built his own private home recording studio, where he recorded demos for much of the band's early material and later his first solo album, Who Came First. The recording sessions for the album inspired the Beatles' Paul McCartney to experiment with home recording on his 1970 debut solo album McCartney. Other early pioneers of home recording include Sly and the Family Stone.

In 1973, Jamaican reggae producer Lee "Scratch" Perry built Black Ark Studios, where he pioneered several innovative production techniques as well as the dub genre. In 1986, American musician Prince, built a private home recording studio known as Paisley Park.

== Studio equipment ==
Until the late 1970s, music could be recorded either on low-quality tape recorders or on large, expensive reel-to-reel tape machines. Due to their high price and specialized nature, reel-to-reel machines were only practical for professional studios and wealthy artists. In 1979, Tascam invented the Portastudio, a small four-track machine aimed at the consumer market.

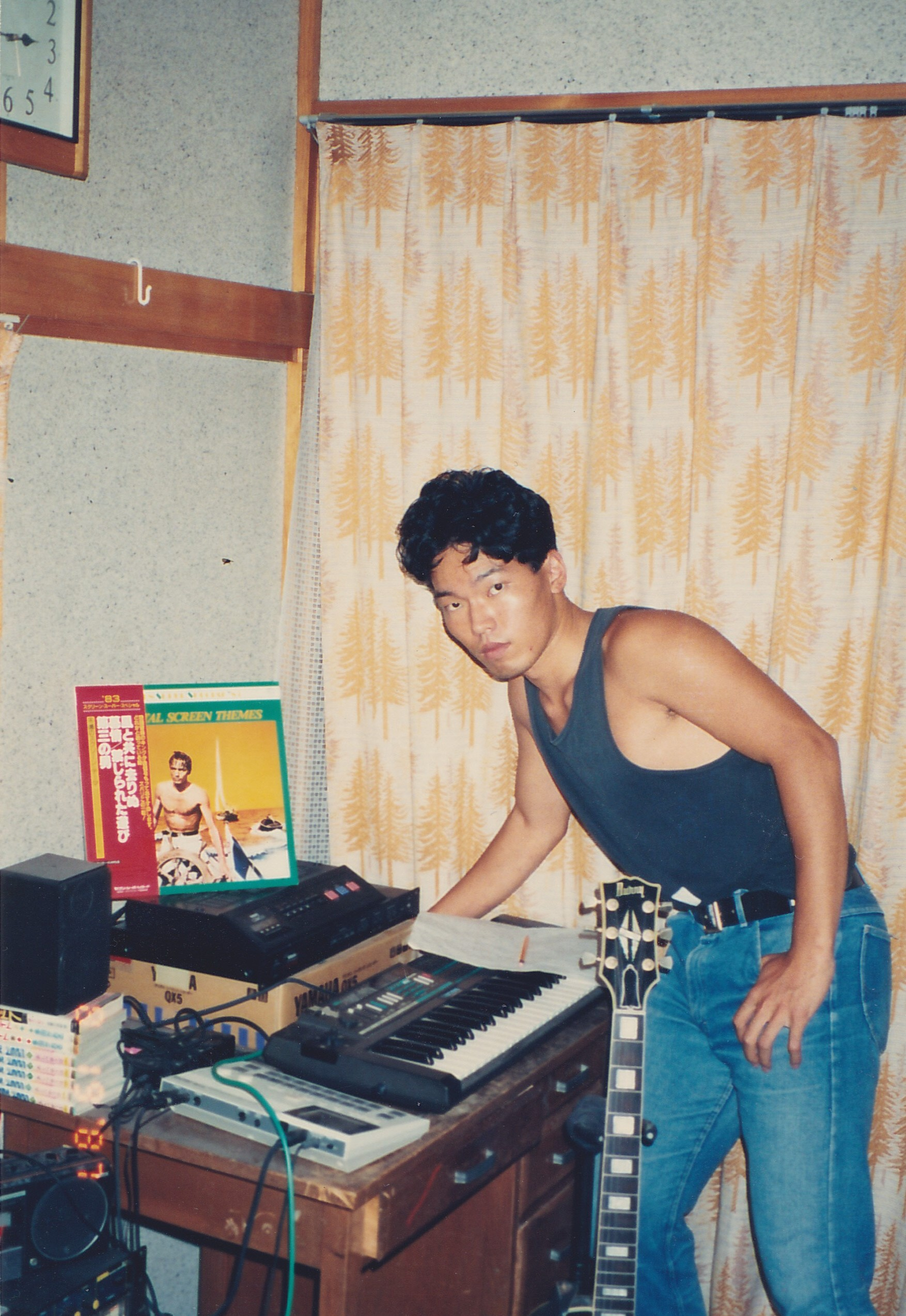
Home recording environment during mid-80's in Japan

With this new product, small multitrack tape recorders became widely available, and grew in popularity throughout the 1980s.

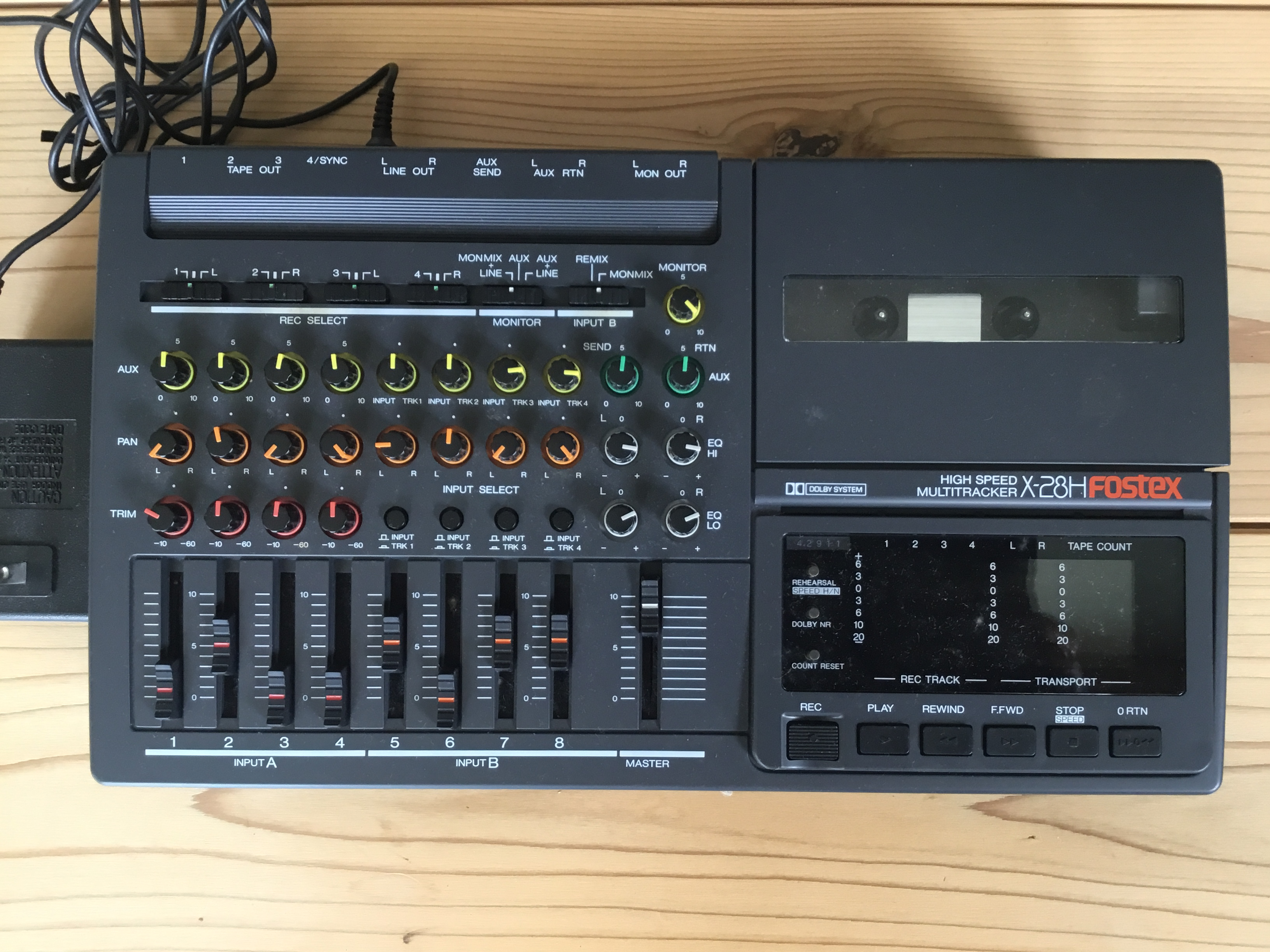
Fostex X-28H, a 4 track cassette recorder

In the 1990s, analog tape machines were supplanted by digital recorders and computer-based digital audio workstations (DAWs). These new devices were designed to convert audio tracks into digital files, and record the files onto magnetic tape (such as ADAT), hard disk, compact disc, or flash ROM.

The way the room sounds or reverberates can dramatically change the way music is written, recorded and mixed. Untreated rooms have an uneven frequency response, which means that any mixing decisions made are based on a sound that is ‘colored’, because mixing engineers cannot accurately hear what was originally played. Acoustic panels and bass traps can improve the sound in the room.

== Impact on professional recording studios ==
Professional recording studios have been heavily impacted by the growth of home studio technology over the last two decades. The advancements in such technology along with the moderate to low budgets of up-and-coming and even established artists have put many commercial studios out of business. Many professional engineers have moved from these commercial studios into their own homes to be able to work with their clients at a more accessible cost. Artists have also set up their home studios to self-record and produce their own material and not have to deal with high budgets and expensive studio time. Lack of album sales in recent years and major record labels cutting their budgets to fund their artists and producers to record in these high-end studios have done a significant amount of damage as well. Some of music's iconic studios have been forced to shut their doors for good due to these circumstances. The list of these studios include The Hit Factory, which was located in New York City and home to albums such as Born in the U.S.A. by Bruce Springsteen and Graceland by Paul Simon, Sony Music Studios, which was also located in New York City and where Nirvana recorded MTV Unplugged in New York, and Olympic Studios in London, where works by Eric Clapton, Jimi Hendrix and The Rolling Stones were recorded.

Even though these commercial studios are able to produce a quality recording for the artists that record in them, many of the recording software used in home studios can emulate what the consoles and tape recorders are able to do. As mentioned in the Los Angeles Times, according to the National Association of Music Merchants (NAMM), the trade group for music retailers and manufacturers: "The total computer music market went from just under $140 million in sales in 1999 to almost a half-billion dollars in 2008". So while album sales have significantly dropped in the past decade, which has forced recording studios to cut costs, the sales of computer software and technology related to music have significantly increased as well. Maureen Droney, senior director of the Recording Academy's Producers & Engineers Wing, spoke to the Los Angeles Times and reflected on what the recording studios have come to be in today's music industry with the following statement: "In some ways we've come full circle ... We've gone back to being small and entrepreneurial. People still look to commercial studios when they have something to offer that they can't do at home. But, as it is, the recording studio business started with people starting small, funky studios, oftentimes in bedrooms and garages."

== See also ==
- Lo-fi music
- Bedroom pop
- Chillwave
- Hypnagogic pop
- Egg punk
