= Super Snooper =

Super Snooper may refer to:

- Snooper and Blabber, a segment of the 1959 animated series The Quick Draw McGraw Show
- Super Fuzz, a 1980 Italian superhero comedy film by Sergio Corbucci
- Super Snõõper, a 2023 studio album by Snõõper
