= Lili (album) =

Studio album by Lili Haydn
- Released: 1997
- Genres: Classical, pop
- Label: Atlantic
- Producer: Lili Haydn

Lili Haydn chronology
Lili (1997)	Light Blue Sun (2003)

Lili is the debut album by the musician Lili Haydn, released in 1997 by Atlantic Records. She supported the album by opening for Matchbox 20 on a North American tour.

== Critical reception ==
Professional ratings
Review scores
Source	Rating
AllMusic	4/5 stars
Los Angeles Times	2/4 stars

The Los Angeles Times wrote that "Haydn's high-pitched vocals may not appeal to some listeners ... and at times her violin sounds equally shrill in the mix." AllMusic compared her to "the equally eccentric Tori Amos" and said that Lili has a "pop/rock foundation with classical overtones ... as well as elements of everything from urban contemporary and hip-hop to Middle Eastern and Mediterranean music", resulting in an album that offers "more and more of its richness with each listen."

== Track listing ==
1. Stranger (Lili Haydn, Matt Sherrod, Lotus Weinstock) 4:58
2. Someday (Haydn, Glen Ballard) 4:01
3. Real (Haydn, Sherrod) 4:04
4. Salome (Haydn, Corky James) 3:05
5. Take Somebody Home (Haydn, Peter Rafelson) 4:37
6. Faithful One (Haydn, Jeffrey Connor) 4:30
7. Baby (Haydn, James) 5:27
8. Mama (Haydn) 5:03
9. Daddy (Haydn) 4:56
10. Wants Deep (Haydn) 6:25

== Musicians ==
- Vocals, violin – Lili Haydn
- Cello – Gerri Sutyak
- Guitar – George Nakas, Frankie Blue, Corky James
- Bass – Jeffrey Connor
- Drums – Toss Panos
- Keyboards, CS80, percussion – Harleigh Kibbee
- Produced by Lili Haydn except 6, produced by Lili Haydn and Jeffrey Connor
