= Terminal Love =

Studio album by Peter Ivers
- Released: 1974
- Studios: Producers' Workshop (Hollywood, CA)
- Genres: Art rock; glam rock; experimental rock; new wave
- Length: 34:11
- Label: Warner Bros. Records
- Producers: Buell Neidlinger, Peter Ivers

Terminal Love is the second studio album by American musician Peter Ivers. It was released in 1974.

== Style ==
Tucson Weekly described it as a "pop/prog/avant-garde album". According to Josh Frank, Terminal Love "had clearly been attempting, at least, to be a pop album", noting that the songs were shorter and featured "standard variations on the verse-chorus-verse structure". He also noted a greater influence of blues and blues rock, with Ivers' erstwhile jazz and baroque influences buried "deep in the background". Jason Ankeny of AllMusic wrote that the album "suggests the work of Captain Beefheart; indeed, Magic Band/Frank Zappa collaborator Elliot Ingber appears on several tracks." "The album" wrote Jim Allen for Bandcamp Daily, "was no wistful collection of gently introspective ballads: Its songs sport unorthodox structures, shifting tempos and time signatures, and arch, witty lyrics referencing everything from Freud, Adler, and Reich (“Holding the Cobra”) to time and space travel (“Alpha Centauri”) and physical entropy (the title track)." The article also noted Ivers' voice: "High and reedy enough to make Neil Young sound like Johnny Cash, it has more in common with future innovators like Television’s Tom Verlaine or The Violent Femmes’ Gordon Gano than any of Ivers’ contemporaries."

== Reception ==
Rolling Stone called Terminal Love an "uncomfortable album" which is populated by cynical and "bloodless characters". Women's Wear Daily described it as a "delicate blend of jagged frenzy".

David Lynch collaborated with Ivers on the Eraserhead soundtrack after listening to this album (resulting in the song "In Heaven").

== Legacy ==
In 2013, The Guardian included Terminal Love in their "101 Strangest Albums on Spotify" series. The newspaper noted that 30 years on, "Ivers' oddball leanings sound entirely contemporary. Those same arrangements that seemed so off-putting in 1974 feel rich and comfortable now, and the passing of time has leant Terminal Love a delicious hipster twang it couldn't possibly have enjoyed as a new release." Entertainment Weekly noted that "the idiosyncratic tunes [had] more in common with the new-wave sound of the late ’70s than anything popular at the time."

Yura Yura Teikoku lead singer Shintaro Sakamoto called it his favorite album of all time, writing: "Terminal Love sounded to me like music from a completely mysterious world. It sounded both cosmic and microscopic at the same time, and very sexy too. And though I listened to it over and over again, I never got tired of it. To this day, I’m not aware of another record like this, and if anybody knows, I’d like to be informed." In a 2010 piece for NME, Danger Mouse listed Terminal Love as one of his favorite "underrated records."

== Track listing ==
1. "Alpha Centauri" – 3:15
2. "Sweet Enemy" – 2:45
3. "Terminal Love" – 2:52
4. "My Grandmother's Funeral" – 2:21
5. "Modern Times" – 3:09
6. "Deborah" – 3:56
7. "Oo Girl" – 2:25
8. "Audience of One" – 4:58
9. "Felladaddio" – 1:47
10. "Holding the Cobra" – 4:23
11. "Even Stephen Foster" – 2:20

== Personnel ==
- Peter Ivers – vocals, harmonica, keyboards
- Ben Benay, David Cohen, Paul Lenart, Elliot Ingber – guitar
- Buell Neidlinger – bass
- Alice DeBuhr – drums
- Billy Osbourne – percussion
- Marty Krystall – saxophone
- Kathy Appleby – violin
- Andra Wills, Dean Rod, Jackie Ward, Lisa Roberts, Marti McCall, Sherlie Matthews – backing vocals

== Credits ==
- Bart Chiate, Jerry Hall – Recording
- Robert Lockart – Art Direction
- Steven Silverstein – Photograph
- Alan Siegel – "Production Advisor"

== Additional sources ==
- http://www.allmusic.com/album/terminal-love-mw0000507387 <Allmusic
- http://www.theguardian.com/music/musicblog/2013/may/08/101-strangest-spotify-peter-ivers Guardian blog
