= Lili Haydn =

Canadian musician

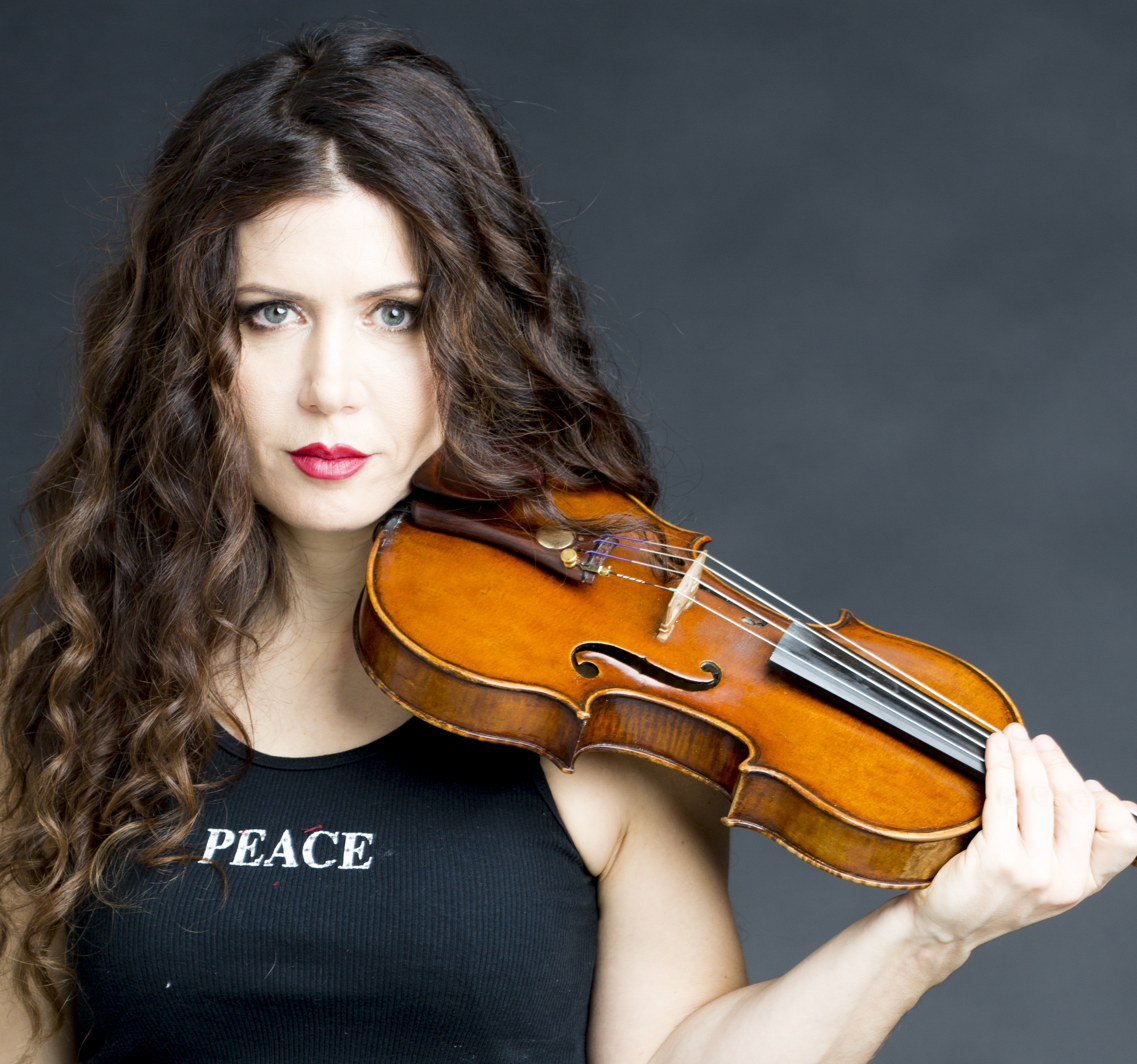

Background information
- Also known as: "Helicopter"
- Born: Toronto, Ontario, Canada
- Genres: Classical rock, jazz rock, rock, alternative rock
- Occupations: Musician, songwriter, actress
- Instruments: Vocals, violin, piano
- Labels: Atlantic, Nettwerk, Arista, Private Music
- Website: lilihaydn.com

Lili Haydn is a Canadian-born violinist, film and TV composer, singer-songwriter, and former child actor. She won a Grammy Award in 2019 for Opium Moon and was nominated for an Emmy Award for "Outstanding Original Music And Lyrics" in the TV series, Ginny & Georgia in 2023. In 2025, she was nominated for a Grammy Award for Lullabies For The Brokenhearted for Best Chamber Music/Small Ensemble Performance. As a solo artist she has released four albums.

She was the opening act for Jimmy Page and Robert Plant, Sting, and George Clinton and The P-Funk Allstars and has collaborated with Roger Waters, Hans Zimmer, Josh Groban, Herbie Hancock, B. B. King, Seal, Nusrat Fateh Ali Khan, Los Angeles Philharmonic, and others.

== Early life and education ==
Haydn was born in Toronto, Ontario, Canada. She is the daughter of comedian Lotus Weinstock and video artist David Jove, who was one of the first people to mass-produce LSD. Haydn's parents allowed her to choose her own first name. She reportedly chose the name "Helicopter" by which she was known briefly.

When she was three years old, Haydn and her mother moved to the United States. For a time, they lived at the Brotherhood of the Source, a commune in the Hollywood Hills led by Father Yod. Haydn's father eventually rescued the two from the commune cult. As a child, she pursued a career as an actress; at age eight she discovered the violin and began to focus on classical music. By the time Haydn was 15, she had played with the Los Angeles Philharmonic. After graduating from Brown University with a BA in political science, Haydn started composing original songs and became one of the most requested session violinists around Los Angeles.

== Career ==
=== Acting ===
Haydn began her career as a child actress at the age of seven. She initially appeared in commercials and moved on to television and film roles. From 1979 to 1980, she played Jenny Columbo, daughter of Lt. Columbo and his wife, Kate Columbo/Callahan (Kate Mulgrew) in the Columbo spin-off series Mrs. Columbo. In 1983, she starred as Belinda Capuletti, the smart and sassy daughter of Rodney Dangerfield's character in the comedy film Easy Money. She also appeared in the first Not Quite Human TV movie in 1987, and was a regular cast member on the syndicated sitcom The New Gidget.

She has a bit part in the Michael Keaton movie Jack Frost.

=== Music ===
Haydn began playing the violin at the age of eight. She played her first professional gig in 1990. In 1992, Haydn graduated from Brown University with a BA in political science and began to pursue a career in music.

By the time she signed with Atlantic in 1997 and released her debut album, Lili, she had embraced a variety of genres, having played with Quwaali musician Nusrat Fateh Ali Khan, Porno for Pyros, Tracy Chapman, The Jayhawks, Brandy, Tony! Toni! Tone!, No Doubt, Tom Petty and more. In addition, she has played with, sung with, and opened for Sting, Josh Groban, Herbie Hancock, Jimmy Page and Robert Plant, Matchbox 20, Seal, and George Clinton, who calls her "the Jimi Hendrix of the violin".

Following the album's release, she toured as an opening act for Jimmy Page and Robert Plant's 1998 tour of North America. Her second album, Light Blue Sun, was released in 2003, followed by 2008's Place Between Places, which she promoted with television and radio appearances such as The Tonight Show with Jay Leno, and NPR. NPR described "Place Between Places" as "A mix of neo-psychedelic flower child and rock star virtuoso...Heifetz meet Hendrix." She contributed to the score of the Edward Burns/Jennifer Aniston film She's the One (1996), as well as several films with Hans Zimmer, including Disney's Pirates of the Caribbean: At World's End.

Haydn won a fellowship to the Sundance Film Institute composing in 2009, and has composed the film scores for three films, Jacklight, The Horse Boy (premiered at Sundance Film Festival and released in 2009 by Zeitgeist Films), and The Lightmaker.

In 2008, Haydn accompanied Roger Waters at the Coachella music festival when they played "The Dark Side of the Moon". Haydn also performed on Cyndi Lauper's True Colors Tour 2008. That same year she appeared on the cable TV series Californication. In 2009, Haydn sustained neurological damage after being exposed to the pesticide Chlordane. While she was unable to write lyrics, she was still able to compose music. For the next five years, she continued working on film scores and composed music for her fourth album, Lililand, released in September 2014.

Since the release of Lililand in 2014, Haydn has scored seven films, including Academy Award winner Freida Mock's Anita, The House that Jack Built, and Sundance Selects' Driver X. She has also worked on the score for Seasons 2 and 3 of the Emmy-winning series Transparent, and has done four high-impact TED presentations.

In 2018, Haydn joined with musicians Hamid Saeidi, MB Gordy, and Itai Disraeli to create the group Opium Moon. Their eponymous album was awarded a Grammy in the category of Best New Age Album.

In 2021, Haydn released a new single, "Sayonara". She has since been working on scoring a number of TV and film projects, including the feature documentary "Strip Down, Rise Up by Oscar-nominated director Michele Ohayon and Freida Mock's latest documentary, RUTH: Justice Ginsburg in Her Own Words.

In 2025, she was nominated for a Grammy Award for Lullabies For The Brokenhearted for Best Chamber Music/Small Ensemble Performance.

== Filmography ==
- 1996 - She's the One - (Tom Petty/Tom Petty & the Heartbreakers) - guest artist, violin
- 1999 - Anywhere but Here - songwriter, performer "Come Here"
- 2007 - Pirates of the Caribbean: At World's End - fiddle, violin, vocals
- 2008 - Californication - vocals, violin
- 2009 - The Horse Boy - composer
- 2010 - The Town - violin
- 2011 - Zeitgeist: Moving Forward - composer
- 2011 - Pirates of the Caribbean: On Stranger Tides - vocals, violin
- 2013 - The Wolverine - violin
- 2013 - Anita: Speaking Truth to Power - composer
- 2013 - Snowpiercer - violin soloist
- 2014 - The Sublime and Beautiful - composer, theme music, violin, vocals
- 2016 - Ben Hur - vocals, violin solo
- 2017 - DriverX - composer
- 2018 - The House That Jack Built - composer, theme music
- 2018 - Feminists: What Were They Thinking? - composer
- 2019 - Ruth: Justice Ginsburg in Her Own Words composer
- 2021 - Strip Down, Rise Up - composer
- 2021 - present - Ginny & Georgia (3 seasons) - composer
- 2024 - Bad Faith - composer
- 2024 - Nobody Leaves 'til Jesus Comes - composer

=== Awards ===
Year	Nominated work	Category	Award	Result
1989	Dakota's Way	Best Young Actress in a TV Special, Pilot, Movie of the Week, or Mini-Series	Youth in Film Award	Nominated
2014	The Sublime and Beautiful	Best Music	Milan Film Festival Award	Won
2019	Opium Moon	Best New Age Album	Grammy Award	Won
2021	Strip Down, Rise Up	Best Original Score - Documentary	Hollywood Music in Media Award	Nominated
2022	Ginny & Georgia	Best Music in a Streaming Series	BMI Film & TV Award	Won
2022	Night + Day	Best New Age Album	Grammy Award	Nominated
2023	Split at the Root	Best Original Score - Documentary	Hollywood Music in Media Award	Nominated
2023	Ginny & Georgia	Outstanding Original Music And Lyrics (Marriage is a Dungeon)	Emmy Award	Nominated
2025	Lullabies For The Brokenhearted	Best Chamber Music/Small Ensemble Performance	Grammy Award	Nominated

== Activism ==
A social activist, Haydn also performs regularly for various human rights organizations, including Amnesty International, Operation USA, Human Rights Watch, and Human Rights Action Center. Her song "Unfolding Grace" appears on a 2004 CD compilation with U2 and Sting which benefited Aung San Suu Kyi and the Burmese pro-democracy movement.

== Discography ==
- Lili (1997) Atlantic Records
- Light Blue Sun (2003) BMG/Private Music
- Goodbye Stranger Ep (2007) Nettwerk Music Group
- Place Between Places (2008) Nettwerk Music Group
- Lililand (2014)
- Evocations (2015) New Gold Music
- Opium Moon (2018) Be Why Records
- More Love (2021) Lakeshore Records
