= Lotus Weinstock =

American comedian (1943–1997)

Lotus Weinstock (1943-1997) was an American comedian.

== Early life ==
Weinstock was born in 1943 in Philadelphia, Pennsylvania. Her parents were Robert and Lucille Weinstock. She was a natural performer throughout her childhood and into high school as she was known to improvise bits with friends and play the role of the mascot on her cheerleading team. Though she was considered to be a great performer, she often felt like an outcast growing up. After high school, Weinstock went to Emerson College but dropped out to move to New York and try acting and dance, succeeding in acquiring a few Off-Broadway roles. Around 1963 she became a hostess at the oldest rock and roll club in NYC, Greenwich Village's the Bitter End.

== Career ==
=== Singing and writing ===
Weinstock was a stand-up comedian, author, playwright, and musician. Her book, The Lotus Position, is filled with some of her famous jokes like, "I married Mr. Right. Mr. Always Right." Some of these jokes also made it onto greeting cards. The Lotus Position sold about 63,000 copies. Weinstock also wrote the play, "Molly and Maze" that she put on with her daughter, Lili Haydn a few times. Weinstock and Haydn also performed music together. Weinstock also performed in a musical comedy duo, "The Turtles", with Jimmy Gavin. Together, they toured the folk scene circuit. Early in her career, she changed her name to Maurey Haydn. Under this name, one of her songs was recorded by Richie Havens.

=== Comedy: style and stage presence ===
Weinstock was known in the comedy world for making jokes that were never at anyone’s expense. She believed that "when a whole roomful of people are laughing, suddenly you have dissolved the pain and shame of separateness. At that moment, there is no judgment—it is a true release." As most of Lotus’ jokes and moments have, there is always a story behind them, and it often involves her sense of spirituality. On one occasion, Weinstock was too sick to get dressed for a show but still wanted to perform, so she wore a bathrobe on stage. She ended up recovering quickly, and incorporated the robe in her future shows.

Weinstock performed on The Merv Griffin Show, The Tonight Show, The Mike Douglas Show, Politically Incorrect, Make Me Laugh, and The Comedy Store "Pilot." However, she preferred live performance as she found the time constraints of her television appearances constricting. She is well known by other comedians and is cited in books about comedy and specific jokes.

=== Being a woman in comedy ===
Much of Weinstock's humor had to do with being a woman. She joked about her marriage and dating and was also aware of the difference between how women comedians could act versus men. Weinstock dealt with sexual harassment throughout her time as a comedian. She was always a feminist, however, and was optimistic about what that meant for the comedy world, saying "Ten years ago, a woman would not laugh before her date did, so if you did something from a woman’s point of view, the woman wouldn’t want to laugh and expose herself. Now, women will lead the crowd."

Weinstock was a mainstay at the Belly Room, a performance area in the Comedy Store that Mitzi Shore, the owner, opened as a place for only women to perform. Weinstock was thirty-six when the Belly Room opened in 1978. She was considered a "den mother" there, being an older but enthusiastic participant. She and some other women performing in The Belly Room felt it was a place where there was less need for competition and women could perform in a giving environment. Through this venue, Weinstock participated in the USC College of Continuing Education Workshop, "Women and Comedy" in March 1985.

=== Influences ===
Lenny Bruce was a massive influence, not just in Weinstock's life, but on her career as a comedian. Her close comedic friends in the 1980s included Larry Miller, Lucy Webb, Sandra Bernhard, Diane Nichols, Robert Weide, Jay Leno, Jerry Seinfeld, Paul Reiser, Kevin Pollak, Sam Kinison, Paul Mooney, Richard Pryor, Robin Williams, Hennen Chambers, Carrie Snow, Joanne Dearing, Ron Zimmerman, Bill Maher, Argus Hamilton, Taylor Negron, and Phyllis Diller. Lotus was also close friends with Richie Havens.

== Later career ==
Towards the end of Weinstock's career, Joan Rivers accepted the invitation to write the foreword to her book, "The Lotus Position," but changed her mind shortly after. Rivers was sent a death threat. An investigator was hired and determined that the source of the threat was Weinstock herself, though others have speculated it may have instead been a fan who had gone through her mail. Rivers sent the findings to many people in the comedy scene, which hurt Weinstock's career.

== Personal life ==
Weinstock met Lenny Bruce in 1965, when she was 22 and he was 40 years old. They developed an instant connection and were engaged up until his death in August 1966. Weinstock was devastated by his death. Later, Weinstock found herself in Toronto, where she met David Jove. They got married about two weeks after meeting one another, and soon had a daughter together, Lili Haydn. Lotus got into spirituality and in 1971 briefly joined The Source Family which is where the leader, Jim Baker gave her the name Lotus. Weinstock and Jove were divorced in the late 1980s, and she largely raised her daughter by herself. In the 1990s, Weinstock was in a relationship with the British actor and director Steven Berkoff. During her daughter's early childhood, Weinstock began performing less frequently. Before Haydn left to attend Brown University, she and Weinstock performed a show together called "Molly and Maze" at the Eagle Theatre in Beverly Hills; they reprised the show in San Diego at the Gaslamp Quarter Theatre Company's Hahn Cosmopolitan after Haydn graduated.

== Later life and death ==
In November 1996 Weinstock found out she had an untreatable brain tumor. The night before she and Haydn were to go to a clinic in La Jolla that specialized in alternative medicine, she had a seizure that resulted in a herniated brainstem. This left her paralyzed and limited her motor skills as well as her ability to talk. On August 31, 1997, Weinstock died at Kaiser Permanente Hospital in Hollywood at the age of 54. She was surrounded by her daughter and closest friends.

=== Legacy ===
Weinstock was said to be a major influence on many comedians. She was particularly influential on Sandra Bernhard and other women comedians, especially those that performed in the Belly Room. Weinstock was written up in the book of Great Jewish Mothers by Paula Ethel Wolfson.
