= Peter Ivers =

American musician (1946–1983)

Background information
- Born: Peter Scott Rose; September 20, 1946; Illinois, U.S.
- Died: March 3, 1983 (aged 36) Los Angeles, California, U.S.
- Genres: Rock; pop; new wave; bedroom pop
- Occupations: Musician, songwriter, composer, television personality, disc jockey
- Instruments: Vocals; harmonica; keyboards

Peter Scott Ivers (born Peter Scott Rose, September 20, 1946 – March 3, 1983) was an American musician, singer, songwriter and television personality. He served as host of the experimental music television show New Wave Theatre. Despite Ivers never having achieved mainstream success, biographer Josh Frank has described him as being connected by "a second degree to every major pop culture event of the last 30 years."

A native of Brookline, Massachusetts, Ivers' primary instrument was the harmonica and at a concert in 1968, Muddy Waters referred to him as "the greatest harp player alive." After migrating to Los Angeles, Ivers was signed by Van Dyke Parks and Lenny Waronker to a $100,000 contract as a solo artist with Warner Bros. Records in the early 1970s. His albums Terminal Love (1974) and Peter Ivers (1976) sold poorly but later earned a cult following. He made his live debut opening for the New York Dolls and shared concert bills with such acts as Fleetwood Mac and John Cale.

Ivers scored the 1977 David Lynch film Eraserhead and contributed both songwriting and vocals to the piece "In Heaven (Lady in the Radiator Song)". Later in his career, he wrote songs that were recorded by Diana Ross and the Pointer Sisters.

In 1983, Ivers was murdered under mysterious circumstances and the crime remains unsolved.

== Life and career ==
=== Early life ===
Peter Ivers was born in Illinois on September 20, 1946, and spent the first two years of his life in Chicago. His mother Merle Rose was a homemaker; his father Jordan Rose was a physician, and became ill with lung cancer when Peter was two years old. Shortly after Jordan was diagnosed, the family relocated to Arizona in an attempt to help him recover. However, his health declined, and Jordan died in 1949.

Merle quickly remarried to Paul Isenstein, a businessman from the Boston area. She didn't care for his last name, and picked the last name "Ivers" out of the phone book as her new married name (Paul also took the last name, in an attempt to win her affection). Merle was a free spirit and doting mother, who exposed young Peter to a wide variety of music.

From about age four, Peter was raised in Brookline, a suburb of Boston. He attended the Roxbury Latin School and then Harvard University, majoring in classical languages, but chose a career in music. He started playing harmonica with the Boston-based band Street Choir.

=== Early career ===
Ivers embarked on a solo career in 1969 with the Epic release of his debut, Knight of the Blue Communion, featuring lyrics written by Tim Mayer and sung by Sri Lankan jazz diva Yolande Bavan. In 1971 he replaced Bavan with Asha Puthli on Take It Out On Me, his second album for Epic. The single from this second album, a cover of the Marvin Gaye number, "Ain't That Peculiar", backed by Ivers' original, "Clarence O' Day", was released and briefly entered the Top 100 Singles Billboard charts but the album was shelved by Epic (only finally seeing the light of day in 2009).

In 1970, WNET and WGBH presented Jesus, A Passion Play for Americans, a play produced by Timothy Mayer, featuring his and Ivers' songs from Knight of the Blue Communion. Other important roles were played by Andreas Teuber, Asha Puthli, Steve Kaplan and Laura Esterman. The work was broadcast as part of the NET Playhouse series. As a rock retelling of the story of Jesus, the work was a precursor to well-known examples of that genre, such as Godspell and Jesus Christ Superstar.

In 1974, Ivers signed with Warner Bros. Records, where he recorded two more albums.

=== Later career ===
In 1975, Ivers wrote the lyrics to the vocal compositions on the Threshold: The Blue Angels Experience film - "Dawn: Eagle Call / The World Is Golden Too", "Noon: Rise Up Call / Wings / Blues Anthem" and "Night: Night Angels / She Won't Let Go". All were sung by Jim Connor.

In 1976, Ivers was asked by David Lynch to write a song for his movie, Eraserhead. Ivers penned "In Heaven (The Lady in the Radiator Song)", which became the most well-known composition from the film. He also scored the Ron Howard film Grand Theft Auto the following year. In 1979 he scored the fifth episode of the first season of B.J. and the Bear.

In 1977, Ivers produced a synth-pop/disco album for Roderick Taylor titled Victory in Rock City.

Ivers' best friend was Harvard classmate Douglas Kenney, founder of the National Lampoon. Ivers played "Beautiful Dreamer" on the harmonica at Kenney's funeral. Ivers was also a close friend of comedian John Belushi, who likewise preceded him in death.

In 1981, Ivers produced the Circus Mort EP featuring Swans front man Michael Gira and avant-garde drummer Jonathan Kane. 1981 also found Ivers tapped by David Jove to host New Wave Theatre on Los Angeles TV station KSCI which was shown irregularly as part of the weekend program Night Flight on the fledgling USA Network. The program was a frantic cacophony of music, theater and comedy, lorded over by Ivers with his manic presentation. Using a method of filming known as "live taped", the show was the first opportunity for many alternative rock musicians to receive nationwide exposure. Notable bands who appeared on the show included The Angry Samoans, Dead Kennedys, 45 Grave, Fear, Suburban Lawns and The Plugz.

Also in 1981 Ivers experienced commercial success having written a song with John Lewis Parker that became an R&B top ten hit for Phyllis Hyman called "Can't We Fall in Love Again?" Ivers formed a songwriting team with Franne Golde, and several of their compositions were picked up by successful artists, like "Little Boy Sweet" recorded by The Pointer Sisters, "All We Really Need" recorded by Marty Balin, "Let's Go Up" recorded by Diana Ross and "Louisiana Sunday Afternoon" and "Give Me Your Heart Tonight"; both recorded by Kimiko Kasai. Ivers also appears in the film Jekyll and Hyde...Together Again (1982) performing his song "Wham It" and had another composition "Light Up My Body" featured in the soundtrack.

In 1983, he performed on the Antilles Records release Swingrass '83.

== Death and investigation ==
On March 3, 1983, Peter Ivers was found bludgeoned to death with a hammer in his Los Angeles loft space apartment. The killer was never identified.

Several of Ivers' friends told biographer Josh Frank they suspected David Jove with whom the musician had a sometimes contentious relationship. Harold Ramis noted, "As I grew to know David a little better, it just accumulated: all the clues and evidence just made me think he was capable of anything. I couldn't say with certainty that he'd done anything but of all the people I knew, he was the one person I couldn't rule out." However, Derf Scratch (of the band Fear) and several other members of the Los Angeles punk and new wave scene maintained Jove's innocence.

In the hours following his death, LAPD officers sent to Ivers' residence failed to secure the scene, allowing many of Ivers' friends and acquaintances to traffic through the loft space. The scene was contaminated and police even allowed David Jove to leave with the blood-stained blankets from Ivers' bed.

At the time of his death, Ivers had been dating film executive Lucy Fisher for many years. About five weeks after the murder, Fisher paid for a private investigator named David Charbonneau to investigate the crime. Charbonneau interviewed several people who knew Ivers but due to the botched initial investigation, lack of evidence and few witnesses, the renewed investigation came to nothing. Charbonneau stated: "I do not believe it was a break-in. I do not believe it was just someone off the street that Peter brought in [just] because he was a nice guy that night and fell asleep trusting them. I'm not buying it."

== Legacy ==
Shortly after Ivers' death, Lucy Fisher helped establish the Peter Ivers Visiting Artist Program at Harvard in the artist's memory.

Josh Frank and Charlie Buckholtz wrote a book about Ivers' life, art and mysterious death, In Heaven Everything Is Fine: The Unsolved Life of Peter Ivers and the Lost History of New Wave Theatre, published by Simon & Schuster in 2008. On the basis of new information unearthed during the creation of the book, the Los Angeles Police Department's cold case department reopened their investigation into Ivers' death.

In 2013, The Guardian named Terminal Love in their "101 Strangest Albums on Spotify" series. The newspaper noted that 30 years on, "Ivers' oddball leanings sound entirely contemporary. Those same arrangements that seemed so off-putting in 1974 feel rich and comfortable now, and the passing of time has leant [sic] Terminal Love a delicious hipster twang it couldn't possibly have enjoyed as a new release." In a 2010 piece for NME, Danger Mouse listed Terminal Love as one of his favorite "underrated records".

In 2023, director Penelope Spheeris hosted a podcast about Ivers, Peter and the Acid King. The series focused on Ivers' murder and his relationship with David Jove, the titular "acid king."

== Discography ==
- Knight of the Blue Communion (Epic, 1969)
- Terminal Love (Warner Bros., 1974)
- Peter Ivers (Warner Bros., 1976; also known as Peter Peter Ivers)

Posthumous releases

- Nirvana Peter (Warner Bros., 1985; compilation of previous Warner recordings with bonus tracks)
- The Untold Stories (K2B2 Records, 2008)
- Take It Out on Me (recorded for Epic in 1971; released in 2009 by Wounded Bird Records)
- Becoming Peter Ivers (RVNG Intl., 2019)

== Other appearances ==
- Buellgrass – Big Night at Ojai (K2B2 Records, 1983); released on CD as Buellgrass – Across the Tracks
- John Klemmer – Magic and Movement (Impulse!, 1974)

== See also ==
- List of unsolved murders (1980–1999)
