= Harold Ramis =

American actor, comedian, and filmmaker (1944–2014)

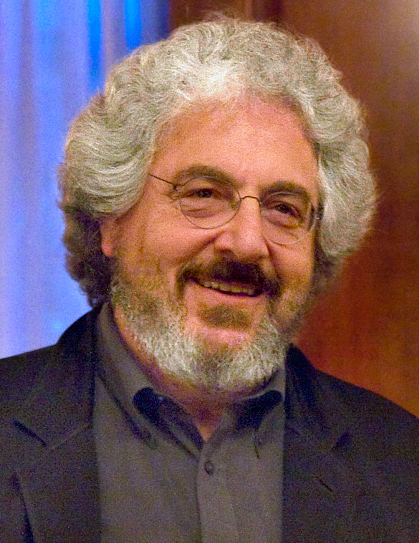
- Ramis in 2009
- Born: Harold Allen Ramis; November 21, 1944; Chicago, Illinois, U.S.
- Died: February 24, 2014 (aged 69); Glencoe, Illinois, U.S.
- Resting place: Shalom Memorial Park, Arlington Heights, Illinois, U.S.
- Education: Washington University in St. Louis
- Occupations: Actor; comedian; filmmaker
- Years active: 1968–2014
- Spouses: Anne Plotkin (m. 1967; div. 1984); Erica Mann (m. 1989)
- Children: 4

Harold Allen Ramis (/ˈreɪmɪs/ RAY-miss; November 21, 1944 – February 24, 2014) was an American actor, comedian, and filmmaker. His film acting roles include Egon Spengler in Ghostbusters (1984) and Ghostbusters II (1989), and as Russell Ziskey in Stripes (1981); he also co-wrote those films. As a director, his films include the comedies Caddyshack (1980), National Lampoon's Vacation (1983), Groundhog Day (1993), Analyze This (1999) and Analyze That (2002). Ramis was the original head writer of the television series SCTV, on which he also performed, as well as a co-writer of Groundhog Day and National Lampoon's Animal House (1978). The final film that he wrote, produced, directed, and acted in was Year One (2009).

Ramis's films influenced subsequent generations of comedians, comedy writers and actors. Filmmakers and actors including Jay Roach, Jake Kasdan, Adam Sandler, Judd Apatow, and Peter and Bobby Farrelly have listed his films among their favorites. Along with Danny Rubin, he won the BAFTA Award for Best Original Screenplay for Groundhog Day.

== Early life ==
Ramis was born on November 21, 1944, in Chicago, Illinois, the son of Ruth (née Cokee) (1919–2001) and Nathan Ramis (1915–2009), who owned the Ace Food & Liquor Mart on the city's West Side. Ramis had a Jewish upbringing, which continued to shape his identity and comedic sensibilities into adulthood. He graduated from Stephen K. Hayt Elementary School in June 1958 and Nicholas Senn High School in 1962, both Chicago public schools, and in 1966 from Washington University in St. Louis, Missouri, where he studied English literature and was a member of the Alpha Xi chapter of Zeta Beta Tau fraternity.

Afterward, Ramis worked in a mental institution in St. Louis for seven months. He later said of his time working there that it:

…prepared me well for when I went out to Hollywood to work with actors. People laugh when I say that, but it was actually very good training. And not just with actors; it was good training for just living in the world. It's knowing how to deal with people who might be reacting in a way that's connected to anxiety or grief or fear or rage. As a director, you're dealing with that constantly with actors. But if I were a businessman, I'd probably be applying those same principles to that line of work.

== Career ==
=== Early years ===
Ramis began writing parodic plays in college, saying years later, "In my heart, I felt I was a combination of Groucho and Harpo Marx, of Groucho using his wit as a weapon against the upper classes, and of Harpo's antic charm and the fact that he was oddly sexy—he grabs women, pulls their skirts off, and gets away with it." He avoided the Vietnam War military draft by taking methamphetamine to fail his draft physical.

Following his work in St. Louis, Ramis returned to Chicago, where by 1968, he was a substitute teacher at schools serving the inner-city Robert Taylor Homes public housing development. He also became associated with the guerrilla television collective TVTV, headed by his college friend Michael Shamberg, and wrote freelance for the Chicago Daily News. "Michael Shamberg, right out of college, had started freelancing for newspapers and got on as a stringer for a local paper, and I thought, 'Well, if Michael can do that, I can do that.' I wrote a spec piece and submitted it to the Chicago Daily News, the Arts & Leisure section, and they started giving me assignments [for] entertainment features." Additionally, Ramis had begun studying and performing with Chicago's Second City improvisational comedy troupe.

Ramis's newspaper writing led to him becoming joke editor at Playboy magazine. "I called…just cold and said I had written several pieces freelance and did they have any openings. And they happened to have their entry-level job, party jokes editor, open. He liked my stuff and he gave me a stack of jokes that readers had sent in and asked me to rewrite them. I had been in Second City in the workshops already and Michael Shamberg and I had written comedy shows in college." Ramis was eventually promoted to associate editor.

=== National Lampoon, SCTV, and The Top ===
After leaving Second City for a time and returning in 1972, having been replaced in the main cast by John Belushi, Ramis worked his way back as Belushi's deadpan foil. In 1974, Belushi brought Ramis and other Second City performers, including Ramis's frequent future collaborator Bill Murray, to New York City to work on The National Lampoon Radio Hour.

During this time, Ramis, Belushi, Murray, Joe Flaherty, Christopher Guest, and Gilda Radner starred in the revue The National Lampoon Show, the successor to National Lampoon's Lemmings. Later, Ramis became a performer on, and head writer of, the Canadian sketch-comedy television series SCTV during its first three years (1976–1979). At this juncture, SCTV was seen mainly in Canada, and also via syndication in scattered markets in the US. He was soon offered work as a writer at Saturday Night Live but chose to continue with SCTV. Characterizations by Ramis on SCTV include weaselly, corrupt and constantly sweating Dialing for Dollars host/SCTV station manager Maurice "Moe" Green, outwardly amiable (but thoroughly fascist) cop Officer Friendly, exercise guru Swami Bananananda (whose real name was Dennis Peterson), stern board chairman Allan "Crazy Legs" Hirschman and home dentist Mort Finkel. His celebrity impressions on SCTV included Kenneth Clark and Leonard Nimoy.

In 1984, Ramis executive produced a music/comedy/variety television show called The Top. The producer was Paul Flaherty and the director was David Jove. Ramis got involved after the mysterious death of his friend Peter Ivers, who had hosted Jove's underground show New Wave Theatre. He called Jove and offered to help. Flaherty and Jove pitched him the idea for The Top, and Ramis was instrumental in getting it on the air.

The show was a mixture of live music, videos, and humor. Performers on the show included Cyndi Lauper, who performed "Girls Just Want to Have Fun" and "True Colors"; the Hollies, who performed "Stop in the Name of Love"; and the Romantics, who performed their two hits at the time, "Talking in Your Sleep" and "What I Like About You".

Guest stars included Rodney Dangerfield, Chevy Chase, and Dan Aykroyd. Ramis got Bill Murray to host but, because Ghostbusters filming ran late, he did not make it to the taping. Chase came out dressed as a "punk" of the time and somehow got into a physical altercation with an audience member (also a punk) during the opening monologue. He immediately left the taping. Flaherty and Jove carried on with the show.

Ramis then got Andy Kaufman to fill in for Chase and recorded the host segments at a separate, later, session; it would be Kaufman's final professional appearance.

The Top aired on Friday, January 27, 1984, at 7 p.m. It scored a 7.7% rating and a 14% share. This represented a 28% rating increase and a 27% share increase over KTLA's regularly scheduled Happy Days/Laverne and Shirley.

=== Film career ===
Ramis left SCTV to pursue a film career and wrote a script with National Lampoon magazine's Douglas Kenney, which eventually became National Lampoon's Animal House. They were later joined by a third collaborator, Chris Miller. The 1978 film followed the struggle between a rowdy college fraternity house and the college dean. The film's humor was raunchy for its time. Animal House "broke all box-office records for comedies" and earned $141 million.

He also had a voice part as Zeke in the "So Beautiful & So Dangerous" segment of Heavy Metal in 1981.

Ramis next co-wrote the comedy Meatballs, starring Bill Murray. The movie was a commercial success and became the first of six film collaborations between Murray and Ramis. His third film and his directorial debut was Caddyshack, which he wrote with Kenney and Brian Doyle-Murray. It starred Chevy Chase, Rodney Dangerfield, Ted Knight, and Bill Murray. Like Ramis's previous two films, Caddyshack was a commercial success.

In 1982, Ramis was attached to direct the film adaptation of the Pulitzer Prize-winning book A Confederacy of Dunces by John Kennedy Toole. The film was to star John Belushi and Richard Pryor, but the project was abandoned. In 1984, Ramis collaborated with Dan Aykroyd on the screenplay for Ghostbusters, which became one of the biggest comedy hits of all time, in which he also starred as Dr. Egon Spengler. He reprised the role for the 1989 sequel, Ghostbusters II (which he also co-wrote with Aykroyd). His later film Groundhog Day has been called his "masterpiece".

His films have been noted for attacking "the smugness of institutional life…with an impish good [will] that is unmistakably American." They are also noted for "Ramis's signature tongue-in-cheek pep talks." Sloppiness and improv were also important aspects of his work. Ramis frequently depicted the qualities of "anger, curiosity, laziness, and woolly idealism" in "a hyper-articulate voice".

Ramis also occasionally acted in supporting roles in acclaimed films that he did not write or direct, such as James L. Brooks's Academy Award-winning As Good as It Gets (1997) and Judd Apatow's hit comedy Knocked Up (2007).

In 2004, Ramis turned down the opportunity to direct the Bernie Mac-Ashton Kutcher film Guess Who, then under the working title "The Dinner Party", because he considered it poorly written. That same year, he began filming the low-budget The Ice Harvest, "his first attempt to make a comic film noir." Ramis spent six weeks trying to get the film greenlit because he had difficulty reaching an agreement about stars John Cusack's and Billy Bob Thornton's salaries. The film received mixed reviews. In 2004, Ramis's typical directing fee was $5 million.

In an interview in the documentary American Storytellers, Ramis said he hoped to make a film about Emma Goldman (even pitching Disney with the idea of having Bette Midler star) but that none of the film studios were interested and that it would have been difficult to raise the funding.

Despite some hesitation about making sequels, Ramis consistently said that he was open to making a third Ghostbusters film, as long as the script was strong enough to honor the franchise. In 2009, he said that a third film was set for release either in mid-2011 or for Christmas 2012. A reboot to the franchise, also called Ghostbusters, was eventually made and released in 2016, directed and co-written by Paul Feig. In this film, a bronze bust of Ramis can be seen when Erin Gilbert leaves her office at Columbia University. Later, the second sequel to the original film, Ghostbusters: Afterlife, was released in 2021 and posthumously dedicated to him.

== Personal life ==
Ramis was married twice and had four children. On July 2, 1967, he married San Francisco artist Anne Plotkin, with whom he had a daughter. Actor and Ghostbusters co-star Bill Murray is her godfather. Ramis and Plotkin separated in 1984 and later divorced.

Ramis's second daughter was born in 1985 to him and director Amy Heckerling, while Heckerling was married to actor-director Neal Israel.

In 1989, Ramis married Erica Mann, daughter of director Daniel Mann and actress Mary Kathleen Williams. Together they had two sons.

Ramis was culturally Jewish—at times identifying with Humanistic Judaism—and had a strong spiritual connection to Buddhism. Erica's Buddhist upbringing greatly influenced his philosophies, and he carried a pocket-sized primer on Buddhism and spent time with the Dalai Lama.

Ramis was a Chicago Cubs fan, and when he moved back from Los Angeles to Chicago in the late 1990s, he would attend games at Wrigley Field, sometimes taking part of the seventh-inning stretch of "Take Me Out to the Ball Game". His pastimes included fencing, ritual drumming, acoustic guitar, and making hats from felted fleece; additionally, he taught himself to ski by watching skiers on television.

== Illness and death ==
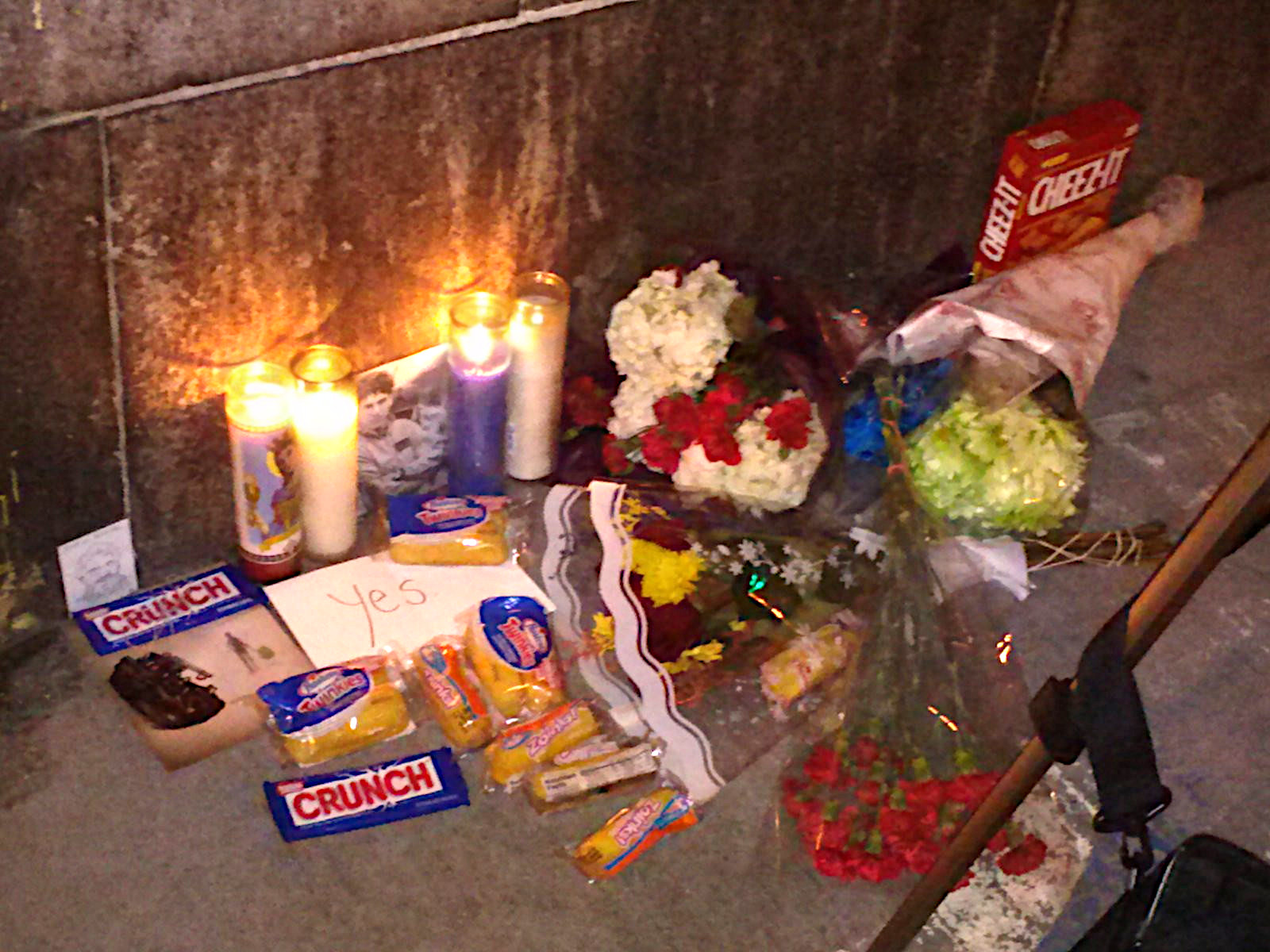
A memorial to Ramis at the Hook & Ladder Company 8 firehouse, where Ghostbusters was filmed

In May 2010, Ramis contracted an infection that triggered autoimmune inflammatory vasculitis, and lost the ability to walk. After relearning to walk, he suffered a relapse of the disease in late 2011, from which he never fully recovered. Ramis died on February 24, 2014, at his home on Chicago's North Shore, at age 69. A private funeral was held for him two days later with family, friends, and several collaborators in attendance, including Bill Murray, Dan Aykroyd, Brian Doyle-Murray, Cindy Morgan, Michael O'Keefe, John Larroquette, Judge Reinhold, Eugene Levy, Dave Thomas, David Pasquesi, Andrew Alexander, Chevy Chase and the widows of John Belushi, John Candy and Bernard Sahlins. He is buried at Shalom Memorial Park in Arlington Heights.

Upon Ramis's death, then-President Barack Obama released a statement, saying, "When we watched his movies—from Animal House and Caddyshack to Ghostbusters and Groundhog Day—we didn't just laugh until it hurt. We questioned authority. We identified with the outsider. We rooted for the underdog. And through it all, we never lost our faith in happy endings." He ended his statement by saying he hoped Ramis "received total consciousness", in reference to a line from Caddyshack.

Ramis and longtime collaborator Bill Murray had a falling out during the filming of Groundhog Day, which Ramis attributed to problems that Murray had in his own life at the time, plus creative differences between the two about the overall direction and mood of the film. Afterwards, they did not speak for more than 20 years, nor did they ever collaborate in any films. Shortly before Ramis's death, Murray, encouraged by his brother Brian Doyle-Murray, visited him to make amends with a box of doughnuts and a police escort, according to Ramis's daughter Violet. At that point, Ramis had lost most of his ability to speak, so Murray did most of the talking over several hours, as the two finally made peace. Murray gave a tribute to Ramis at the 86^{th} Academy Awards.

Stephen Colbert paid tribute to Ramis on an episode of his show The Colbert Report. Colbert said: "as a young, bookish man with glasses looking for a role model, I might have picked Harold Ramis". He ended the show by thanking him.

== Awards and honors ==
In 2004, Ramis was inducted into the St. Louis Walk of Fame. In 2005, he received the Austin Film Festival's Distinguished Screenwriter Award. In 2010, he received a lifetime achievement award from the Chicago Improv Festival. In 2015, the Writers Guild of America posthumously honored him with their lifetime achievement award, the Laurel Award for Screenwriting Achievement.

In 2016, two years after his death, The Second City founded the Harold Ramis Film School, the first film school to focus solely on film comedy, in his honor.

The 2016 film Ghostbusters, a reboot of the series Ramis co-created and starred in, was posthumously dedicated to him. A bust of Ramis appears in the film. In the 2021 movie Ghostbusters: Afterlife, the age-progressed image of Ramis appears as the ghost of Egon Spengler; a dedication before the end credits also reads "for Harold."

On February 2, 2024, Chicago declared every February 2 going forward to be "Harold Ramis Day".

== Collaborations ==
Ramis frequently collaborated with director Ivan Reitman. He co-wrote National Lampoon's Animal House, which Reitman produced, then co-wrote the Reitman comedy Meatballs; he co-wrote and appeared in the Reitman films Stripes, Ghostbusters and Ghostbusters II.

== Filmography ==
=== Film ===
Year	Title	Director	Writer	Producer
1978	National Lampoon's Animal House	No	Yes	No
1979	Meatballs	No	Yes	No
1980	Caddyshack	Yes	Yes	No
1981	Stripes	No	Yes	No
1983	National Lampoon's Vacation	Yes	No	No
1984	Ghostbusters	No	Yes	No
1986	Back to School	No	Yes	No
1986	Armed and Dangerous	No	Yes	No
1986	Club Paradise	Yes	Yes	No
1988	Caddyshack II	No	Yes	No
1989	Ghostbusters II	No	Yes	No
1991	Rover Dangerfield	No	Story	No
1993	Groundhog Day	Yes	Yes	Yes
1995	Stuart Saves His Family	Yes	No	No
1996	Multiplicity	Yes	No	Yes
1999	Analyze This	Yes	Yes	No
2000	Bedazzled	Yes	Yes	Yes
2002	Analyze That	Yes	Yes	No
2005	The Ice Harvest	Yes	No	No
2009	Year One	Yes	Yes	Yes

Executive producer

- The First $20 Million Is Always the Hardest (2002)
- I Want Someone to Eat Cheese With (2006)
- Archie's Final Project (2009)

=== Television ===
Year	Title	Director	Writer	Notes
1979	Delta House	No	Yes	Pilot episode
1982	The Rodney Dangerfield Show: It's Not Easy Bein' Me	No	Yes	
2006–2010	The Office	Yes	No	4 episodes

=== Acting roles ===
Year	Title	Role	Notes
1976–1978	Second City Television	Various roles	28 episodes
1981	Stripes	Russell Ziskey	
1981	Heavy Metal	Zeke	Voice (segment "So Beautiful and So Dangerous")
1983	Spacehunter: Adventures in the Forbidden Zone	Intercom	Voice, uncredited
1983	National Lampoon's Vacation	Marty Moose	Voice, uncredited
1984	Ghostbusters	Dr. Egon Spengler	
1987	Baby Boom	Steven Bochner	
1988	Stealing Home	Alan Appleby	
1989	Ghostbusters II	Dr. Egon Spengler	
1993	Groundhog Day	Neurologist	
1994	Airheads	Chris Moore	
1994	Love Affair	Sheldon Blumenthal	
1997	As Good as It Gets	Dr. Martin Bettes	
2000	High Fidelity	Rob's Dad	Deleted scenes
2002	Orange County	Don Durkett	
2002	I'm with Lucy	Jack	
2006	The Last Kiss	Professor Bowler	
2007	Knocked Up	Ben's Dad	
2007	Walk Hard: The Dewey Cox Story	L'Chai'm	
2009	Year One	Adam	

=== Video games ===
Year	Title	Voice role	Notes
2009	Ghostbusters: The Video Game	Dr. Egon Spengler	Also writer

=== Archival appearances ===
Year	Title	Role	Notes
2015	Lego Dimensions	Dr. Egon Spengler	Voice role
2019	Ghostbusters: The Video Game Remastered	Dr. Egon Spengler	Voice role
2019	Cleanin' Up the Town: Remembering Ghostbusters	Himself	Documentary film
2021	Ghostbusters: Afterlife	Dr. Egon Spengler	Digital likeness superimposed on Bob Gunton and Ivan Reitman, Also archival footage and photographs
2024	Ghostbusters: Frozen Empire	Dr. Egon Spengler	Archival footage and photographs

== Bibliography ==
- Ramis Stiel, Violet (2018). Ghostbuster's Daughter: Life with My Dad, Harold Ramis. Penguin. ISBN 9780735217898.
