= David Jove =

Canadian film producer

- Born: David Sniderman; December 14, 1942; Toronto, Ontario, Canada
- Died: September 26, 2004 (aged 61); Los Angeles, California, United States
- Occupations: Film director, film producer, writer
- Spouse: Lotus Weinstock
- Children: Lili Haydn

David Jove (December 14, 1942 – September 26, 2004), born David Sniderman, was a Canadian director, producer, and writer, particularly of underground and alternative music-themed films.

Jove is also a likely suspect for the murder of Peter Ivers, his colleague on the television show New Wave Theatre.

== Career ==
After spending the mid-1960s in London, he became acquainted with the Rolling Stones' circle of friends. Calling himself "Acid King David", he participated in a government drug set-up of Mick Jagger and Keith Richards, resulting in the infamous 'Redlands' bust.

It was later discovered that he had been caught carrying drugs at Heathrow airport and had been offered a deal by the authorities, to avoid jail and deportation, if he helped set up the Rolling Stones. Immediately after the Redlands bust, he was allowed to fly out of the UK and therefore avoided prosecution. Later, he moved to Los Angeles, where he would be based for the rest of his life.

He may have been best known as the creator of the early 1980s music program New Wave Theatre, hosted by Peter Ivers, which gained notoriety in the early days of cable television. It was shown as part of USA Network's late night weekend variety show, Night Flight.

"New Wave Theatre" was co-written by longtime Jove collaborator and former Billboard editor Ed Ochs, who also wrote the liner notes to Jove's two records, "Sweeter Song" and "Into the Shrine" (co-writing "Never Say Never" on "Shrine"). Ochs also co-wrote Jove's only feature film, "Stranger Than Love" (originally "I Married My Mom!"), and, with Jove, formed one half of Oxygen, a studio band which fused rock and disco and in 1979 recorded an EP of six original Jove/Ochs songs, "The Bones of Hollywood".

Jove met music video producer Paul Flattery at a 1983 New York Billboard Video conference and formed an association which resulted in the music video "Stop in the Name Of Love" for the reformed English band The Hollies, with Graham Nash and the TV show "The Top," which came about after Peter Ivers' murder. Several of Ivers friends told biographer Josh Frank they suspected Jove, with whom Ivers had a sometimes contentious relationship. Producer/director/writer Harold Ramis, a friend of Ivers, noted, "As I grew to know David a little better, it just accumulated: all the clues and evidence just made me think he was capable of anything. I couldn't say with certainty that he'd done anything but of all the people I knew, he was the one person I couldn't rule out." However, Derf Scratch (of the band Fear) and several other members of the Los Angeles punk and new wave scene maintained Jove's innocence.

In the immediate aftermath of Ivers’ killing, Jove was offered help by Ramis, and together with Flattery, created and made "The Top" for KTLA. The show was a mixture of live music, videos and humor. Performers on the series include Cyndi Lauper, who performed "Girls Just Want to Have Fun" and "True Colors". The Hollies performed "Stop! In the Name of Love" and The Romantics performed "Talking in Your Sleep" and "What I Like About You". Guest stars included Rodney Dangerfield, Bill Murray and Dan Aykroyd. The host was Chevy Chase, who—dressed as a "punk" of the era—got into a physical altercation with an audience member during the opening monologue. He immediately left the taping. The producers then got Andy Kaufman to fill in for Chase and recorded the host segments at a separate, later, session. It was to be the last professional appearance by Andy Kaufman before his death. "The Top" aired on Friday January 27, 1984 at 7–8 pm. It scored a 7.7% rating and a 14% share. This represented a 28% rating increase and a 27% share increase over KTLA's regularly scheduled "Happy Days/LaVerne & Shirley".

In 2012, Ed Ochs released his memoir about Jove, Freedom Spy: David Jove and The Meaning of Existence. The book detailed Ochs' experience with Jove.

== Personal life ==
Jove was married to actress and comedian Lotus Weinstock. Their daughter is actress and musician Lili Haydn.

== Death ==
Jove was diagnosed with pancreatic cancer just before he died in 2004, aged 61, in Los Angeles.
