= New Wave Theatre =

- Cover of The Best of David Jove's New Wave Theatre, Volume 2
- Genre: Variety; Music
- Written by: David Jove; Ed Ochs
- Directed by: David Jove
- Presented by: Peter Ivers
- Opening theme: "American Music" by The Blasters
- Country of origin: United States
- Original language: English

Production
- Running time: 28 minutes
- Production company: All World Stage

Original release
- Network: USA Network
- Release: 1982 – 1983

New Wave Theatre is a television program that was broadcast locally in the Los Angeles area on UHF channel 18 and eventually on the USA Network as part of the late night variety show Night Flight during the early 1980s. The show was created and produced by David Jove, who also wrote the program with Billboard magazine editor Ed Ochs. It was noted for showcasing rising punk and new wave acts, including Bad Religion, Fear, the Dead Kennedys, 45 Grave, The Angry Samoans and The Circle Jerks.

== Format ==
Peter Ivers, a Harvard-educated musician, was the host for the entire run of the show. The format was extremely loose, in part because of the desire to maintain the raw energy of the live performances, as well as the limited production budget. The program was presented in a format dubbed live taped. The action was shot live and the video was then spliced with video clips, photos and graphics of everything from an exploding atomic bomb to a woman wringing a chicken's neck.

The show started with a montage of clips from punk and new wave acts while the title appeared and the theme song, an abrupt mixture of Fear's "Camarillo" and The Blasters' "American Music", played. Ivers would appear at the beginning and end of each show wearing dark glasses, spouting a stream of consciousness spiel about life, art and music. Besides the top-billed music acts, short skits were shown, including Sri Maharooni, a chain-smoking Indian fakir speaking about the meaning of life, and Chris Genkel (played by actor Robert Roll), a pitchman hawking bizarre products for "gherkins" from his company, Genkel Wax Works, in Adonai, Illinois. Celebrities, including Debra Winger and Beverly D'Angelo, were known to show up at NWT's tapings. Elvira, Mistress of the Dark, who'd just begun hosting Elvira's Movie Macabre on KHJ-TV, appeared on Episode #2 and delivered one of the Genkel Wax Works commercials that week.

New Wave Theatre came to an end in March 1983 when Ivers was found bludgeoned to death in his LA apartment."

Rhino Video released two volumes of the best of New Wave Theatre in 1991 (Rhino Video numbers RNVD 2903 and RNVD 2904). Both are out of print but used copies are not hard to find.

== The Top ==
Ivers' friend, movie producer/director/writer Harold Ramis, offered Jove help and the result was a pilot show for local TV (KTLA) called The Top directed by Jove, produced by the then prolific music video producer Paul Flattery (he and Jove first collaborated on "Stop In The Name Of Love", a video for The Hollies, which incorporated many of Jove's signature public domain footage montages) and executive produced by Ramis. Ramis basically lent his name (as well as industry clout, contacts and credibility) to the show which was conceived partially to continue the spirit of New Wave Theatre but also to take advantage of the then-emerging music video scene. (Flattery's music video resume was a who's who of the 80s).

Chevy Chase was the initial host but during the taping of his monologue at the head of the show, he went off-script and invited a drunk audience member on stage with him. After hurling the guy off-stage, a fight broke out between Chase and the audience and Chase walked off the show. Filming continued and then a week later, inserts were shot with Andy Kaufman as the host (in his last public appearance). The Top got good ratings but despite enlisting Rodney Dangerfield, Bill Murray, Dan Aykroyd, Cyndi Lauper and The Romantics to perform during the pilot, the relationship between all of the parties - Jove, Flattery, Ramis and the KTLA executives - was so damaged by Jove's often bizarre and erratic behavior that no more episodes were produced.
