= New wave music =

Music genre from the 1970s and 1980s

New wave
- Stylistic origins: Punk rock; pop rock; power pop; glam rock; electronic; krautrock; pub rock; art pop; funk; reggae; progressive rock; disco; bubblegum; art rock
- Cultural origins: Mid-to-late 1970s, United States and United Kingdom
- Derivative forms: Alternative dance; alternative rock; Britpop; synth-pop; neo-psychedelia; indie pop; sophisti-pop; post-punk revival; electroclash; chillwave; new wave of new wave; bloghouse; synthwave; new rave; egg punk; vaporwave

Subgenres
- Dark wave; minimal wave

Fusion genres
- Two-tone

Regional scenes
- Germany; Philippines; Yugoslavia

Local scenes
- La Movida Madrileña

Other topics
- Post-punk; post-disco; pop punk; dance-rock; dance-punk; New Romantic; new pop; new musick; Second British Invasion; Post-Brexit New Wave

New wave is a music genre encompassing pop-oriented styles that emerged in the United States and United Kingdom in the mid-to late 1970s. The term was initially synonymous with punk rock but soon branched off into its own distinct style: a lighter and more melodic "broadening of punk culture", in contrast to the more atmospheric sounds of post-punk. Over time, new wave became a catch-all for several musical styles that emerged after the initial popularity of punk, such as synth-pop, power pop, and two-tone ska.

New wave commercially peaked from the late 1970s to mid-1980s with an abundance of one-hit wonders. In 1981, the MTV channel was launched, which heavily promoted and popularized new wave acts in the United States. Regional new wave scenes developed across Europe, particularly the Netherlands' ultra; Germany's Neue Deutsche Welle; Spain's La Movida Madrileña; France, Poland, and Belgium's coldwave; and Yugoslav new wave. Additionally, the movement inspired subgenres such as minimal wave and darkwave.

By the early 1980s, the original new wave movement was considered over in the UK, being succeeded by the new pop and New Romantic movements. Despite this, the US continued using "new wave" as an umbrella term for these new pop and New Romantic acts, such as on MTV. By the late 1980s, new wave's US popularity declined as other genres gained commercial success, such as glam metal, dance-pop, and alternative rock. In the 1990s and 2000s, new wave experienced brief revivals, labelled the "new wave of new wave" and "new new wave" by the press. The genre influenced later internet music-based microgenres such as bloghouse, new rave, chillwave, synthwave, vaporwave, and devocore.

== Etymology and characteristics ==
During the late 1970s and early 1980s, new wave music encompassed a wide variety of pop-oriented styles that shared a quirky, lighthearted, and humorous tone. The term was popularized by Seymour Stein of Sire Records as a catch-all for the various styles of music that emerged after punk rock. The phrase also alluded to the French New Wave, a 1960s film movement known for its experimental approach and departure from traditional forms.

Common characteristics of new wave music include a humorous or quirky pop approach, the use of electronic sounds, and a distinctive visual style in music videos and fashion. According to Simon Reynolds, new wave music had a twitchy, agitated feel. New wave musicians often played choppy rhythm guitars with angular riffs and fast tempos, keyboards, and synthesizers. Stop-start song structures and melodies are common, with the use of jerky rhythms. Reynolds noted new wave vocalists sound high-pitched, geeky, and suburban.

In the US, new wave became widely popularized by channels like MTV, which would play British new wave music videos because most American hit records did not have music videos to play. British videos, according to head of S-Curve Records and music producer Steve Greenberg, "were easy to come by since they'd been a staple of UK pop music TV programs like Top of the Pops since the mid-70s". This rise in technology made the visual style of new wave musicians important for their success. In the early 1980s, virtually every new pop and rock act, particularly those that employed synthesizers, was tagged as "new wave" by the US general public. The term has been described as so loose and wide-ranging as to be "virtually meaningless", according to the New Rolling Stone Encyclopedia of Rock.

A nervous, nerdy persona was a common characteristic of new wave fans and new wave acts, such as Talking Heads, Devo, and Elvis Costello. This persona took the forms of robotic dancing, jittery high-pitched vocals, and fashion choices such as suits and big glasses that hid the body. This seemed radical to audiences accustomed to post-counterculture genres such as disco dancing and macho "cock rock" that emphasized a "hang loose" philosophy, open sexuality, and sexual bravado.

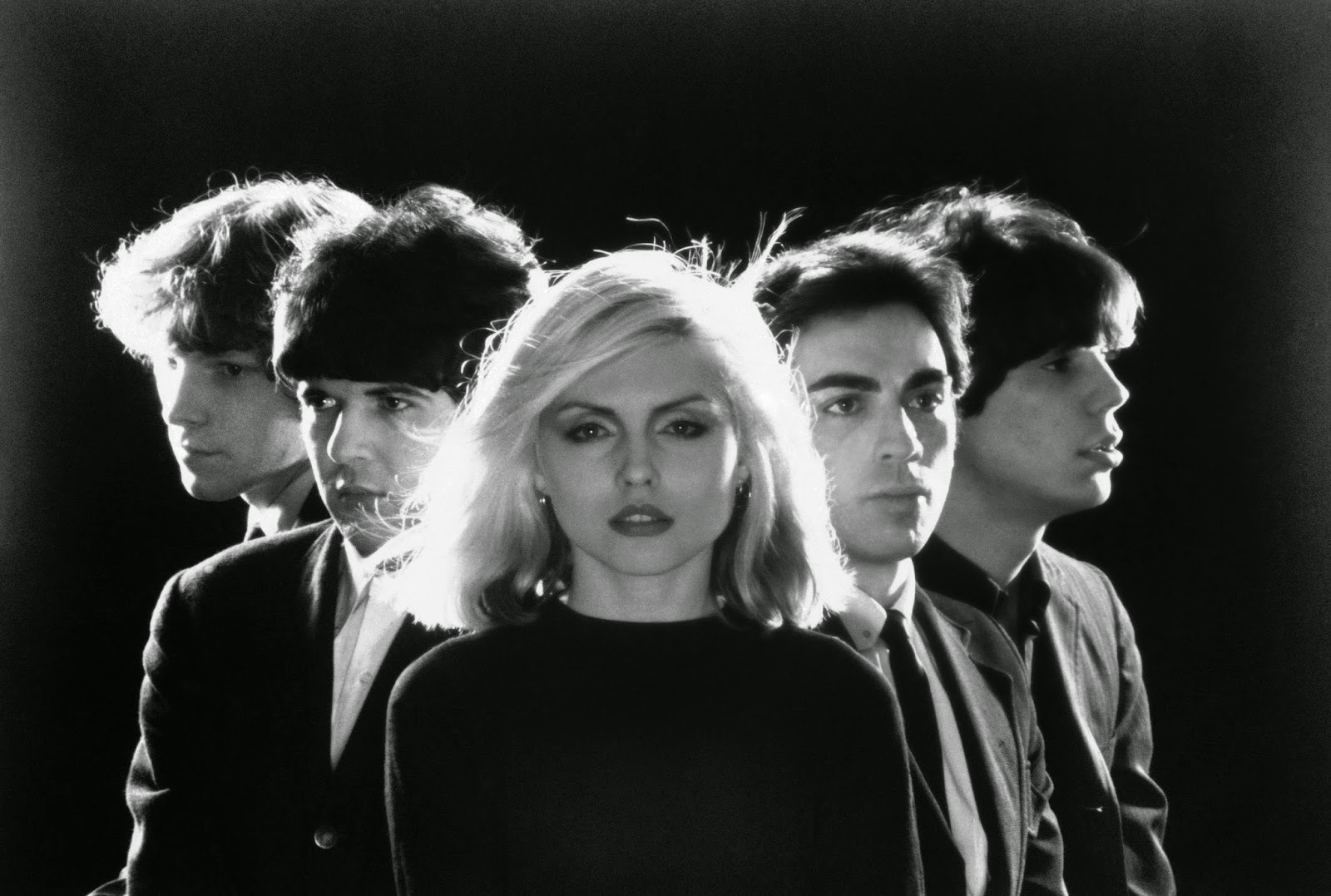
Blondie, 1976. L–R: Gary Valentine, Clem Burke, Deborah Harry, Chris Stein and Jimmy Destri.

New wave may be seen as an attempt to reconcile "the energy and rebellious attitude of punk" with traditional forms of pop songwriting, as seen in the rockabilly riffs and classic craftsmanship of Elvis Costello and the 1960s mod influences of the Jam. Paul Weller, who called new wave "the pop music of the Seventies", explained to Chas de Whalley in 1977:

It's just pop music and that's why I like it. It's all about hooks and guitar riffs. That's what the new wave is all about. It's not heavy and negative like all that Iggy and New York stuff. The new wave is today's pop music for today's kids, it's as simple as that.

Although new wave shares punk's do-it-yourself artistic philosophy, the musicians were more influenced by the light strains of 1960s pop while opposed to mainstream "corporate" rock, which they considered creatively stagnant, as well as the generally abrasive and political bents of punk rock. In the early 1980s, particularly in the United States, notable new wave acts embraced a crossover of pop and rock music with African and African-American styles. Adam and the Ants and Bow Wow Wow, both acts with ties to former Sex Pistols manager Malcolm McLaren, used Burundi-style drumming. Talking Heads' album Remain in Light was marketed and positively reviewed as a breakthrough melding of new wave and African styles, although drummer Chris Frantz said he found out about this supposed African influence after the fact. As the decade continued, new wave elements would be adopted by African-American musicians such as Grace Jones, Janet Jackson, and Prince, who in particular used new wave influences to lay the groundwork for the Minneapolis sound.

== History ==
=== Forerunners ===
The Velvet Underground have been heralded for their influence on new wave. The glam and art rock inspired style of Roxy Music and Sparks were also influential to the genre alongside the works of David Bowie, Iggy Pop and Brian Eno. The work of experimental rock artists such as Captain Beefheart, Frank Zappa, and the Residents, underground psychedelic bands Lothar and the Hand People as well as Germany's krautrock and electronic-based kosmische musik scene, particularly the work of Kraftwerk, have been described as influencing or presaging the movement.

The influence of avant-garde and abstract art movements such as Dada, Cubism and the Bauhaus school would also influence the visual aesthetic and sound of new wave artists, which became contemporaneous with the development of the Memphis Design aesthetic adopted by MTV and many new wave artists during the 1980s. Additionally, Peter Ivers' early output was later recognized as a precursor to new wave with Ivers contributing to the Eraserhead soundtrack and later hosting the influential show New Wave Theatre which helped popularize many early Californian new wave acts.

=== 1970s: Origins and breakthrough ===
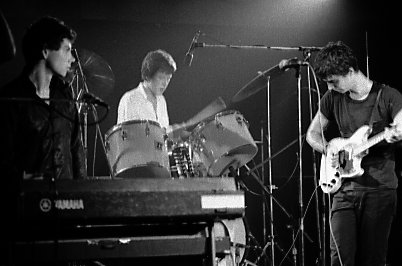
Talking Heads performing in Toronto in 1978

As early as 1973, critics including Nick Kent and Dave Marsh were using the term "new wave" to classify New York proto-punk groups such as the Velvet Underground and New York Dolls. In the US, many of the first new wave groups were found in the early New York punk scene. Acts such as Milk 'N' Cookies, the Shirts, Mumps, Talking Heads, Mink DeVille, and Blondie drew influences from glam, art rock, and power pop and were primarily associated with the CBGB scene, alongside Devo and Pere Ubu, who emerged out of the early Ohio punk scene, and Ultravox in London. Some influential bands, such as New York's Suicide and Boston's the Modern Lovers debuted even earlier, with drummer David Robinson later joining early new wave band the Cars. CBGB owner Hilly Kristal, referring to the first show by Television at his club in March 1974, said; "I think of that as the beginning of new wave".

Between 1976 and 1977, the terms "new wave" and "punk" were used somewhat interchangeably. Music historian Vernon Joynson said new wave emerged in the UK in late 1976, when many bands began disassociating themselves from punk. That year, the term gained currency when it appeared in UK punk fanzines such as Sniffin' Glue, and music weeklies such as Melody Maker and New Musical Express. In November 1976, Caroline Coon used the term "new wave" to designate music by bands that were not exactly punk but were related to the punk-music scene. The mid-1970s British pub rock scene became another source of many of the most-commercially-successful new wave acts, such as Ian Dury and Nick Lowe, as well as Ireland's Boomtown Rats.

In the US, Sire Records chairman Seymour Stein, believing the term "punk" would mean poor sales for Sire's acts who had frequently played the New York club CBGB, launched a "Don't Call It Punk" campaign in October 1977 to replace the term with "new wave". At the time, due to the emergence of bands like the Sex Pistols, the media portrayed punk rock as dangerous and violent, leading to a stigma that made punk music "virtually unmarketable". Emerging groups who stemmed from the punk scene began to adopt "new wave" as a way of marketing music that combined the energy and rebellion of punk but was more radio-friendly. A 1977 Phonogram Records compilation album of the same name (New Wave) includes American punk rock bands such as the Dead Boys and Ramones alongside Talking Heads and the Runaways.

The New York Rocker, which was suspicious of the term "punk", had been using the term "new wave" since December 1976 and was the first American journal to enthusiastically use the term, at first for British acts and later for acts associated with the CBGB scene. At first, most American writers used the term "new wave" exclusively in reference to British punk acts. The music's stripped-back style and upbeat tempos attracted Stein and others to new wave. They viewed it as a return to the energetic stylings of 1950s and 1960s rock and roll, which had dwindled in the 1970s with progressive rock and arena rock.

In England, the terms "post-punk" and "new musick" were popularized and coined by Sounds magazine. Music journalists Jane Suck and Jon Savage published editorials in the 26 November 1977 issue of Sounds entitled "New Musick" to describe a strain of bands that were moving past the garage rock conventions of punk rock and incorporating wider influences. The terms "post-punk" and "new wave" were used interchangeably to describe these groups before the genres perceptibly narrowed, as some artists adopted synthesizers. In London, artists such as Ultravox, Elvis Costello and Gary Numan's Tubeway Army later released influential new wave albums during this period. While punk rock wielded a major influence on the popular music scene in the UK, in the US it remained a fixture of the underground.

By the end of 1977, "new wave" had replaced "punk" as the term for new underground music in the UK. In early 1978, XTC released the single "This Is Pop" as a direct response to tags such as "new wave". Songwriter Andy Partridge later stated of bands such as themselves who were given those labels; "Let's be honest about this. This is pop, what we're playing ... don't try to give it any fancy new names, or any words that you've made up, because it's blatantly just pop music. We were a new pop group. That's all."

In mid-1977, arena rock and disco dominated the US charts while acts associated with punk/new wave received little or no radio airplay and music industry support, despite favorable lead stories by Time and Newsweek. Small new wave scenes developed in major cities, but public support remained limited to elements of the artistic, bohemian, and intellectual population. In early 1979, Eve Zibart of The Washington Post noted the contrast between "the American audience's lack of interest in New Wave music" compared to critics, with a "stunning two-thirds of the Top 30 acts" in the 1978 Pazz & Jop poll falling into the "New Wave-to-rock 'n' roll revivalist spectrum". A month later, Zibart called Elvis Costello the "Best Shot of the New Wave" in America, speculating that "If New Wave is to take hold here, it will be through the efforts of those furthest from the punk center" due to "inevitable" American middle-class resistance to the "jarring rawness of New Wave and its working-class angst".

In late 1978 and 1979, new wave acts began to make chart appearances and receive airplay on rock stations and rock discos in the US. In October 1978, the Cars released the single "My Best Friend's Girl", which reached number three in the UK and was one of the first new wave singles to enter the top 40 on the US Billboard Hot 100 chart. In January 1979, Blondie released "Heart of Glass", which became the first new wave single to reach number one on the US Billboard Hot 100. In June 1979, "My Sharona" by the Knack was released, hitting number one on the Billboard Hot 100; its success, combined with new wave albums being much cheaper to produce during the music industry's worst slump in decades, prompted record companies to sign new wave groups. This success was followed by other new wave hits including M's "Pop Muzik", Tubeway Army's "Are 'Friends' Electric?", the Police's "Roxanne" and "Message in a Bottle", Gary Numan's "Cars", and the Knack's "Good Girls Don't".

=== 1977-1980: New Wave's UK peak ===
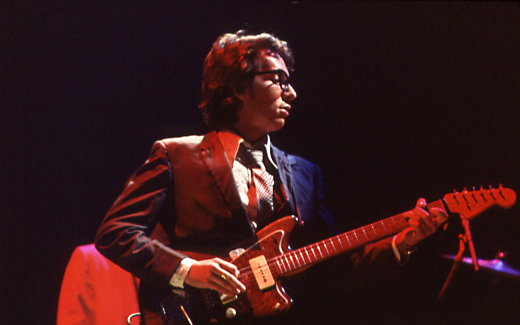
Elvis Costello performing in 1978

Described by Simon Reynolds as years when "Britannia ruled the airwaves", new wave in the late 70s was defined by bands like Buzzcocks, Wire, The Jam and The Stranglers. From mid-1977, punk and new wave bands began to appear on Top of the Pops, beginning with The Jam and followed a week later by The Stranglers in late May. After the Sex Pistols' God Save The Queen peaked at number two in June, followed by Pretty Vacant at number six in July, The Stranglers had three top 10 hits in the latter half of 1977. The following year Blondie had three top 10 hits; their biggest success was breakout single Denis, peaking at number two in March 1978 the same week Nick Lowe had his biggest UK hit with the Top 10 I Love the Sound of Breaking Glass. The second half of 1978 saw newcomer Jilted John reach the top five, while The Boomtown Rats had their first and the first overall new wave number one with Rat Trap in November, peaking the same week two spots ahead of My Best Friend's Girl by The Cars.

As a largely singles-based genre that drew heavily from the classic 1960s pop single, new wave and power pop helped to make 1978 the best-selling year for 7" singles in UK chart history, only to break its own record a year later; to this day, 1979 remains the biggest year for the 7". Blondie had the year's second-best selling single with Heart of Glass, as well as the top-selling album with 1978's Parallel Lines.

The run of new wave number ones of 1979 began in January with Hit Me With Your Rhythm Stick by Ian Dury and the Blockheads, followed by Heart of Glass, which topped the charts for four straight weeks through most of February. Spring 1979 was to prove the height of new wave's popularity: in the same week of March, Elvis Costello and Lene Lovich occupied the number two and number three spots with Oliver's Army and Lucky Number, respectively; Squeeze had their first of two number twos with Cool for Cats in April; M had a number two hit with Pop Muzik in May; and two weeks later Blondie had their second number one of the year with Sunday Girl. The latter half of the year saw number one hits for synthpop groups Tubeway Army (Are Friends Electric?) and The Buggles (Video Killed The Radio Star), a second number one for The Boomtown Rats (I Don't Like Mondays), two number 1 hits for The Police (Message in a Bottle and Walking on the Moon), another top 2 hit for Blondie (Dreaming) and Squeeze (Up the Junction), and top 3 hits for Dury (Reasons to Be Cheerful, Part 3) and The Jam (The Eton Rifles).

Although 1980 did not break the record for 7" single sales set the previous year, the wave of number one hits for new wave artists continued. The Pretenders had the first number one of the year (and the decade) with Brass in Pocket, Blondie had three number ones (Atomic, Call Me, and The Tide Is High), The Jam had two (Going Underground and Start!), and The Police had the year's best-selling single with Don't Stand So Close To Me.

As bands like The Jam, Blondie and The Police established hugely successful careers, by the turn of the decade critics were moving away from using terms like "punk" and "new wave" to describe a set of artists who now dominated the charts and were seen to have become key figures within mainstream popular music. At the same time, the rise of the New Romantics saw a new set of more style-conscious bands rise to the fore, effectively bringing the new wave era to a close in Britain.

=== 1980s: Mainstream US peak ===
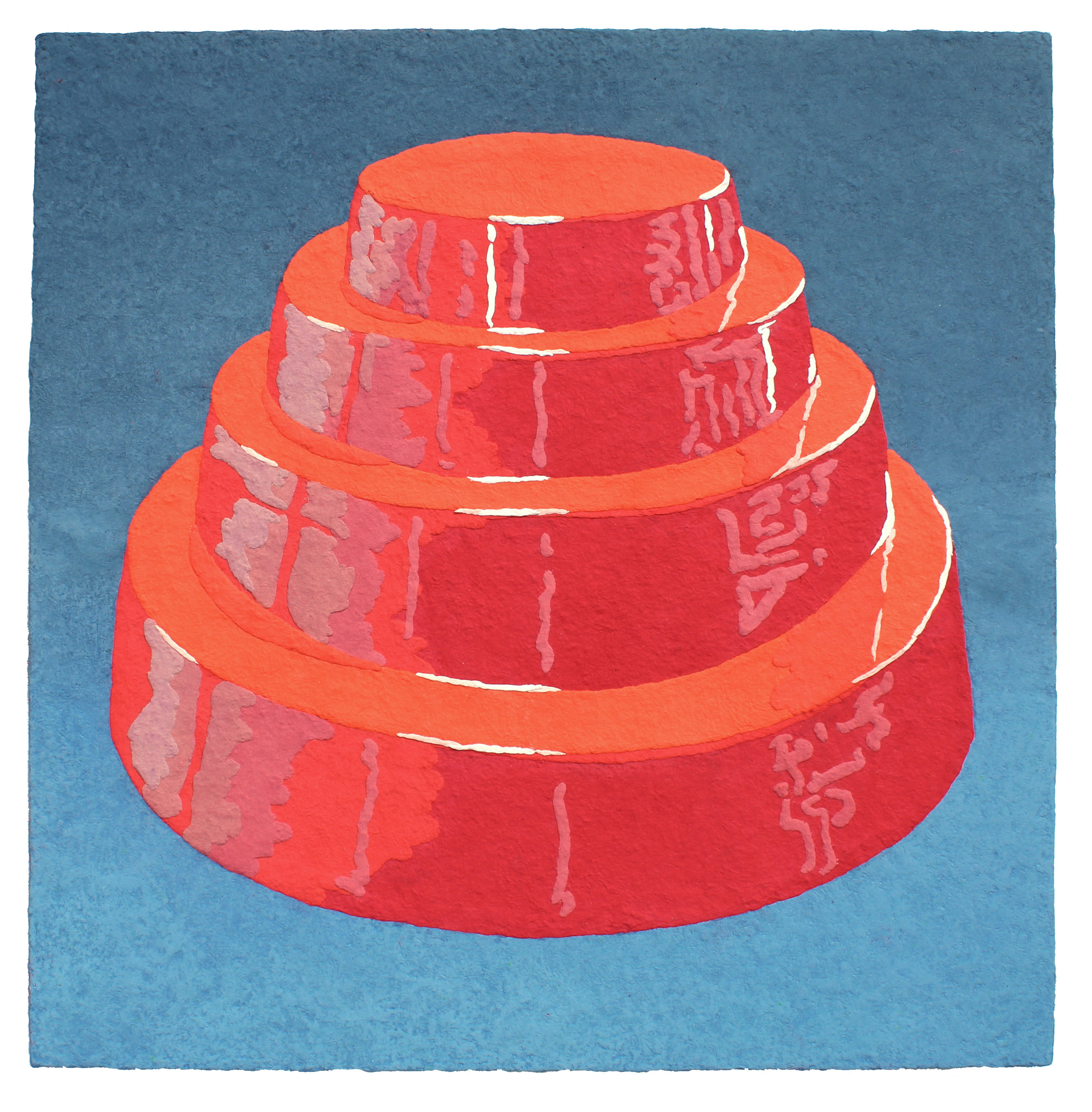
Painting of a Devo energy dome hat

Early in 1980, influential radio consultant Lee Abrams wrote a memo saying with a few exceptions, "we're not going to be seeing many of the new wave circuit acts happening very big [in the US]. As a movement, we don't expect it to have much influence." A year earlier, Bart Mills of The Washington Post asked "Is England's New Wave All Washed Up?", writing that "The New Wave joined the Establishment, buying a few hits at the price of its anarchism. Not a single punk band broke through big in America, and in Britain John Travolta sold more albums than the entire New Wave." Lee Ferguson, a consultant to KWST, said in an interview that Los Angeles radio stations were banning disc jockeys from using the term and noted; "Most of the people who call music new wave are the ones looking for a way not to play it". Second albums by new wave musicians who had successful debuts, along with newly signed musicians, failed to sell and stations initially pulled most new wave programming, such as Devo's socially critical but widely misunderstood song "Whip It".

In 1981, however, the start of MTV began new wave's most successful era in the US. British musicians, unlike many of their American counterparts, had learned how to use the music video early on. Several British acts on independent labels were able to outmarket and outsell American musicians on major labels, a phenomenon journalists labeled the "Second British Invasion" of "new music", which included many artists of the style-conscious New Romantic movement. The early 1980s also saw brief forays into new wave by non-new wave artists, such as Billy Joel (Glass Houses), Donna Summer (The Wanderer), Robert Palmer (Clues), Linda Ronstadt (Mad Love), and Don Henley (I Can't Stand Still and Building the Perfect Beast).

New wave was closely tied to punk and came and went more quickly in the UK and Western Europe than in the US. At the time punk began, it was a major phenomenon in the UK and a minor one in the US. When new wave acts started being noticed in the US, the term "punk" meant little to mainstream audiences, and it was common for rock clubs and discos to play British dance mixes and videos between live sets by American guitar acts. In a December 1982 Gallup poll, 14% of American teenagers rated new wave as their favorite type of music, making it the third most-popular genre. New wave had its greatest popularity on the West Coast. Unlike other genres, race was not a factor in the popularity of new wave music, according to the poll. Urban contemporary radio stations were the first to play dance-oriented new wave bands such as the B-52's, Culture Club, Duran Duran, and ABC.

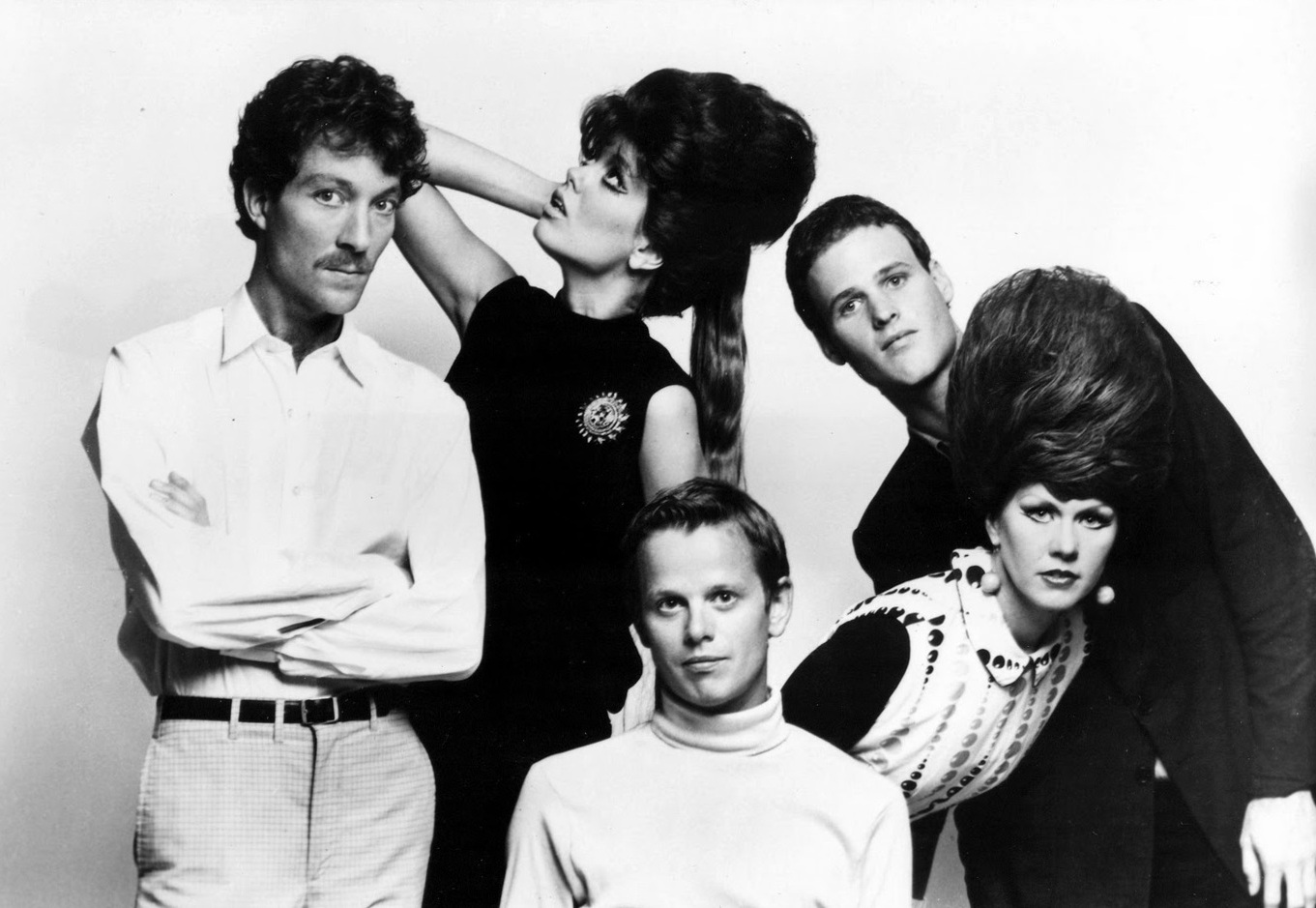
The B-52s, 1980

New wave soundtracks were used in mainstream Brat Pack films such as Sixteen Candles, Pretty in Pink, and The Breakfast Club, as well as in the low-budget hit Valley Girl. John Hughes, the director of several of these films, was enthralled with British new wave music, and placed songs from acts such as the Psychedelic Furs, Simple Minds, Orchestral Manoeuvres in the Dark, and Echo and the Bunnymen in his films, helping to keep new wave in the mainstream. Several of these songs remain standards of the era.

Critics described the MTV acts of the period as shallow or vapid, and homophobic slurs were used to describe some of the new wave musicians. Despite the criticism, the danceable quality of the music and the quirky fashion sense associated with new wave musicians appealed to audiences. Peter Ivers, who started his career in the late 1960s, went on to become the host for the television program New Wave Theatre, which showcased rising acts in the underground new wave scene. He has been described by NTS Radio as "a virtuosic songwriter and musician whose antics bridged not just 60s counterculture and New Wave music but also film, theater, and music television".

In the UK and among many US and UK critics, new wave was largely considered "over" by the early 1980s, being supplanted by the new pop and New Romantic movements. In 2005, Andrew Collins of The Guardian offered the breakup of the Jam, and the formation of Duran Duran, as two possible dates marking the "death" of new wave. British rock critic Adam Sweeting, who described the Jam as "British New Wave at its most quintessential and successful", remarked that the band broke up "just as British pop was being overrun by the preposterous leisurewear and over-budgeted videos of Culture Club, Duran Duran and ABC, all of which were anathema to the puritanical Weller". According to authors Stuart Borthwick and Ron Moy, "After the monochrome blacks and greys of punk/new wave, synth-pop was promoted by a youth media interested in people who wanted to be pop stars, such as Boy George and Adam Ant".

Despite this, among the US general public, "new wave" continued being used as an umbrella term for these new pop, synth-pop, and New Romantic acts. Writing in 1989, music critic Bill Flanagan said; "Bit by bit the last traces of Punk were drained from New Wave, as New Wave went from meaning Talking Heads to meaning the Cars to Squeeze to Duran Duran to, finally, Wham!". Illustrating the varied meanings of "new wave" in the UK and the US, Collins recalled how growing up in the 1970s he considered the Photos, who released one album in 1980 before splitting up a year later, as the most "truly definitive new wave band". In the same article, reviewing the American book This Ain't No Disco: New Wave Album Covers, Collins noted that the book's inclusion of such artists as Big Country, Roxy Music, Wham!, and Bronski Beat "strikes an Englishman as patently ridiculous", but that the term means "all things to all cultural commentators". By the 2000s, critical consensus favored "new wave" to be an umbrella term that encompasses power pop, synth-pop, two-tone ska, and the softer strains of punk rock. In the UK, some post-punk music developments became mainstream.

=== Decline and successors ===
In the US, new wave continued into the mid-1980s, but declined in the late 1980s with the popularity of glam metal, dance music, and alternative rock. MTV continued its heavy rotation of videos by "post-New Wave pop" acts "with a British orientation" until 1986–87, when it changed to a heavy metal and rock-dominated format. Some new wave acts, particularly INXS, shifted from new wave to a more straightforward rock sound. In the UK, new wave "survived through the post-punk years, but after the turn of the [1980s] found itself overwhelmed by the more outrageous style of the New Romantics". In response, many British indie bands adopted "the kind of jangling guitar work that had typified New Wave music", with the arrival of the Smiths characterised by the music press as a "reaction against the opulence/corpulence of nouveau rich New Pop" and "part of the move back to guitar-driven music after the keyboard washes of the New Romantics".

In September 1988, Billboard launched its Modern Rock chart, the acts on which reflected a wide variety of stylistic influences. New wave's legacy remained in the large influx of acts from the UK and acts that were popular in rock discos, as well as the chart's name, which reflects the way new wave was marketed as "modern". According to Steve Graves, new wave's indie spirit was crucial to the development of college rock and grunge/alternative rock in the latter half of the 1980s and onward.

== Revivals ==
=== 1990s ===
In the aftermath of grunge, the British music press launched a campaign to promote the new wave of new wave that involved overtly punk and new wave–influenced acts such as Elastica, but it was eclipsed by Britpop, which took influences from both 1960s rock and 1970s punk and new wave.

=== 2000s–2010s ===
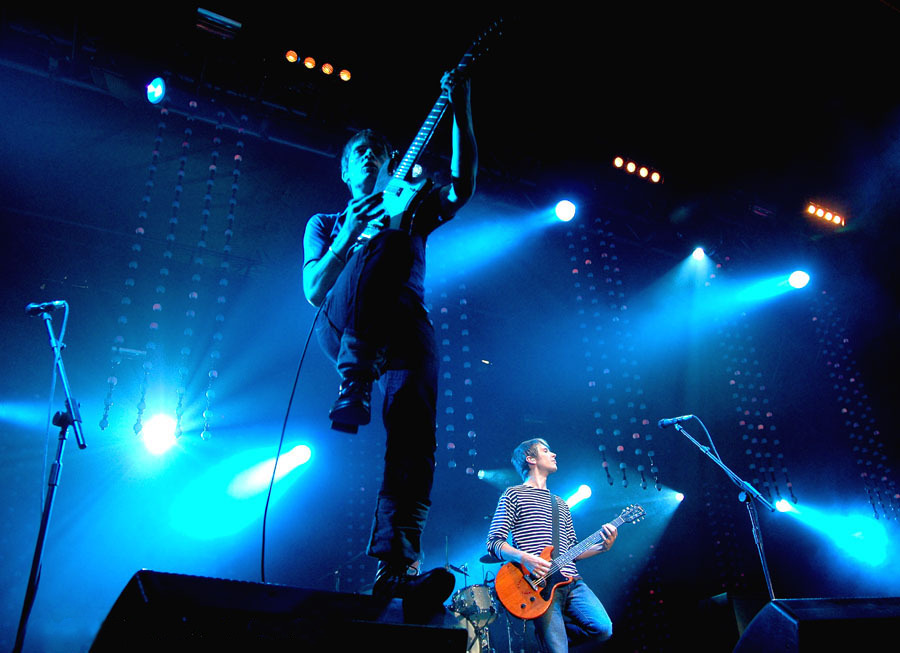
Franz Ferdinand performing in 2006

During the 2000s, a number of artists who exploited a diversity of new wave and post-punk influences emerged through the alternative rock scene. In New York, these acts were encompassed by the electroclash and post-punk revival movement, sometimes labeled "New New Wave".

According to British music journalist Chris Nickson, Scottish band Franz Ferdinand revived both Britpop and the music of the late 1970s "with their New Wave influenced sound". AllMusic notes the emergence of these acts "led journalists and music fans to talk about a post-punk/new wave revival" while arguing it was "really more analogous to a continuum, one that could be traced back as early as the mid-'80s". In England, the resurgence of indie rock music that emerged through the 2000s post-punk revival scene led to a proliferation of formulaic acts collectively labelled "landfill indie". James New of Mumm-Ra, an artist associated with this era, stated: "I went into a weird new-wave band, because it felt so saturated seeing the same bands with kids in skinny jeans."

New wave revivalism influenced later internet microgenres such as bloghouse, chillwave, synthwave and vaporwave. In the mid- to late 2010s, an online internet meme, led to the coining of a microgenre originally known as "devo-core", and later renamed "egg punk". The style was pioneered by Indiana band the Coneheads and characterized by the zany, lo-fi, and edgier aspects of new wave band Devo.

=== 2020s ===
In 2021, the New York electroclash and bloghouse scenes of the 2000s which drew inspiration from new wave music, led a woman named Olivia V. to coin an internet aesthetic known as "indie sleaze", through the launching of the Instagram account @indiesleaze, which was dedicated to documenting the visual style of that period.

== Regional scenes ==
=== Soviet Union ===
During the 1970s and 1980s, an underground music scene influenced by the punk subculture in the United States and UK led to the development of several post-punk and new wave influenced acts in the Soviet Union. Soviet post-punk/new wave bands gained prominence primarily in Moscow and Leningrad and included Alyans, Kino, Akvarium, Auktyon, Nautilus Pompilius and Piknik. Soviet new wave music later influenced the modern Sovietwave movement during the 2000s and 2010s.

=== Spain ===
In post-Francoist Spain during the late 1970s and early 1980s, the influence of punk rock led to La Movida Madrileña (The Madrid Scene), a countercultural movement centered in Madrid that emerged after the death of Spanish dictator Francisco Franco. The movement musically drew influences from post-punk, synth-pop and new wave music. In the 2010s and 2020s, the Spanish post-punk scene became encompassed by acts such as Depresión Sonora.

== See also ==
- Postmodern music – Music of the postmodern era
- New musick – Music genre and series of articles by Sounds magazine
- No wave – Music scene
- List of new wave artists
- Lostwave – Music of unknown origin
- Minimal wave – Music genre
- Doomer wave – Music subgenre based on Wojak doomer Internet meme
- Dance-punk revival – Musical revival of the original dance-punk genre
- Garage rock revival – Genre of rock music
- Post-punk revival – Genre of indie rock music
- New wave of new wave – Early 1990s, pre-Britpop music scene in the United Kingdom
- Electroclash – Music genre
- Indie sleaze – Late 2000s-early 2010s aesthetic trend
- Vaporwave – Online musical genre and visual aesthetic
- Synthwave – Music genre

== Bibliography ==
- Cateforis, Theo (2011b). Are We Not New Wave?: Modern Pop at the Turn of the 1980s. University of Michigan Press. ISBN 978-0-472-03470-3.
- Coon, Caroline. 1988: the New Wave Punk Rock Explosion. London: Orbach and Chambers, 1977. ISBN 0-8015-6129-9.
- Haddon, Mimi (2023). What Is Post-Punk?: Genre and Identity in Avant-Garde Popular Music, 1977–82. University of Michigan Press. ISBN 978-0-472-03921-0.
- Unterberger, Richie (2009). White Light/White Heat: The Velvet Underground Day by Day. Jawbone. ISBN 978-1-906002-22-0.
