= Super Snõõper =

- Cover to the digital and vinyl editions; the cassette tape features a distorted, colorful photo of the band

Studio album by Snõõper
- Released: July 14, 2023
- Studio: The Bomb Shelter, Nashville, Tennessee, United States
- Genre: Egg punk
- Length: 22:51
- Label: Third Man
- Producer: Erik Hart

Snõõper chronology
Live at Exit/In 11-23-22 (2023)	Super Snõõper (2023)	Worldwide (2025)

Super Snõõper is the first full-length studio album by American punk rock band Snõõper. The album has received positive reviews from critics and was promoted by single releases and a tour.

== Reception ==
Editors at AllMusic rated this album 3.5 out of 5 stars, with critic Mark Deming writing that "this band covers an impressive amount of ground in a short space" on this album, which is "highly promising and a lot of good, noisy fun". Eve Boothroyd of Clash rated Super Snõõper an 8 out of 10, stating that "there is so much energy and joy in the tracks, they are so playfully constructed and imbued with non-pretentious humour, that it feels like a refreshing diversion from the production heavy and sometimes overly serious albums of the modern day". Editors of Stereogum chose this as Album of the Week, with critic Emma Madden writing that songs "explode like a nailbomb and travel at a breakneck speed while retaining the precision of a Formula 1 driver" and praises the band's ability to mix genres including "garage rock, surf rock, alien synths, drum 'n' bass, field recordings, and samples lifted from a bodybuilding competition, the band's ecstatic musical chops and nonsensical changes are like picking up a fuzzy snake, then a shiny purple ball, then a box of magnets, then a choo-choo train, and discarding them within seconds". Madison Bloom of Pitchfork reviewed "Pod" prior to the album release, calling the track "like a pep rally hijacked by cheerleaders" with "cramped, frantic, and a little bratty" energy. Reviewing the full album for Pitchfork, Nina Corcoran scored it a 7.3 out of 10 and praised its "goofy, revved-up glory".

Editors at Pitchfork included this in their list of the 37 best rock albums of 2023. This was included in the 40 best independent albums of 2023 in BrooklynVegan's Indie Basement.

== Track listing ==
1. "Stretching" – 1:08
2. "Bed Bugs" – 0:34
3. "Pod" – 1:41
4. "Fitness" – 1:55
5. "Powerball" – 1:03
6. "Xerox" – 1:09
7. "Fruit Fly" – 0:55
8. "Inventory" – 0:49
9. "Defect" – 1:38
10. "Town Topic" – 1:33
11. "Music for Spies" – 1:33
12. "Microbe" – 1:59
13. "Unable" – 1:32
14. "Running" – 5:22

== Personnel ==
Snõõper

- Connor Cummins – guitar, whistle
- Jacob Corenflos – bass guitar
- Cam Sarrett – drums
- Happy Haugen – guitar
- Blair Tramel – vocals, electronics

Additional personnel

- Erik Hart – mixing, production
- Monica Murray – photography
- Bill Skibbe – mastering
- Ian Teeple – back cover and insert art
- Jack Tellmann – recording
