= Snõõper =

American rock band

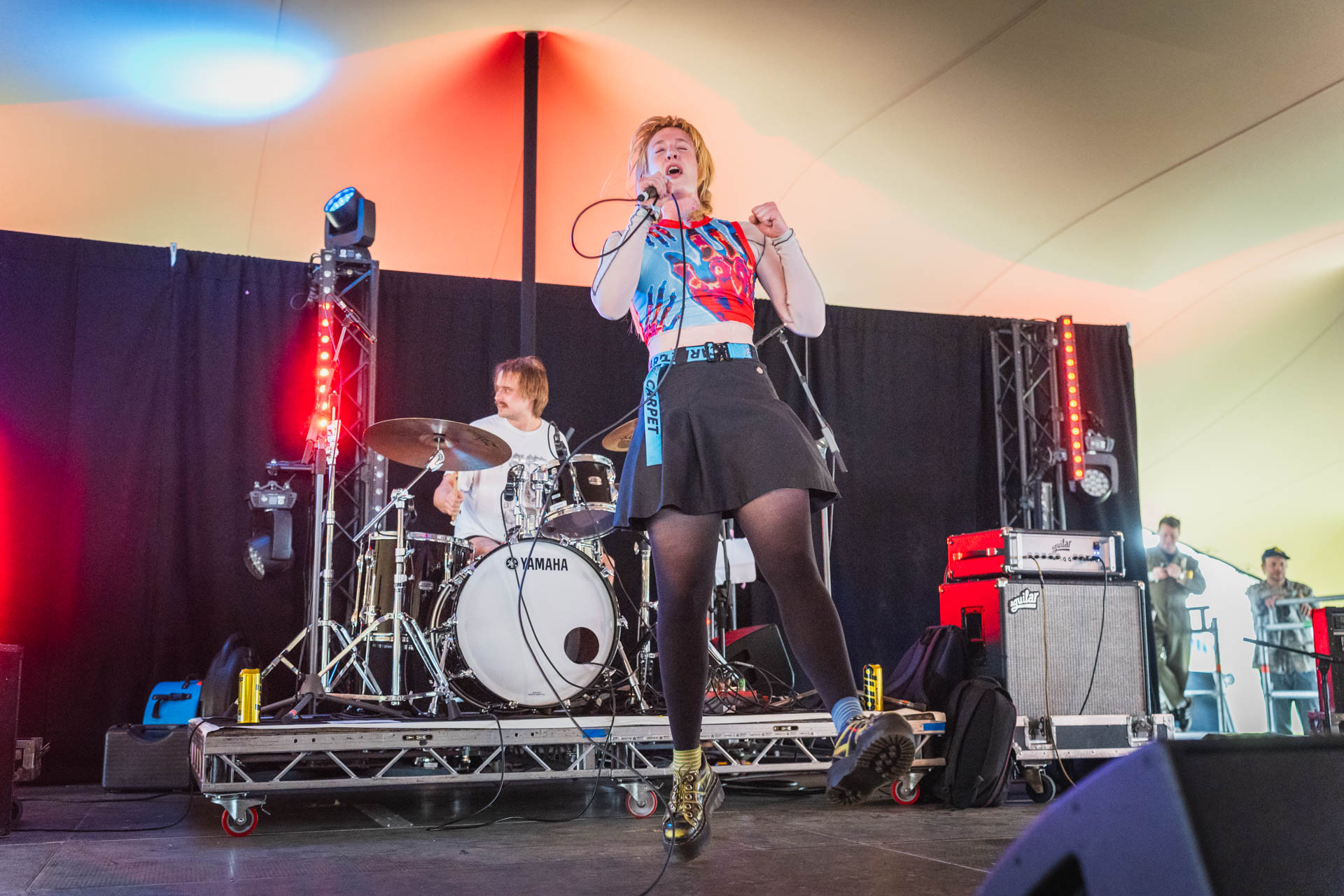

Background information
- Origin: Nashville, Tennessee, United States
- Genres: Egg punk; punk rock
- Years active: 2020–present
- Label: Third Man
- Members: Connor Cummins; Blair Tramel; Happy Haugen; Conner Sullivan
- Past members: Cam Sarrett; Brad Barteau; Ian Teeple
- Website: snooperonline.com

Snõõper is an American punk rock band formed in Nashville, Tennessee in 2020. The band was formed by core duo of vocalist Blair Tramel and guitarist Connor Cummins. Their music is often described as egg punk. They are known for their large papier-mâché puppets at their shows, including their mascot, a large green bug.

== History ==
Blair Tramel, originally from Los Angeles, moved to Nashville to attend Vanderbilt University and became a regular attendee at the city's punk gigs. At these she encountered Connor Cummins who played in local groups such as G.U.N. and Safety Net. They were close friends for years before starting to date. Tramel became a teacher, and has taught at elementary, middle and high schools and in robotics programs.

In 2020, when the first COVID-19 pandemic lockdown began, Cummins started recording demos on an eight-track. Tramel had never sung in a band or played any instruments, and initially planned only to contribute animated music videos to the project, before starting to write lyrics and adding lead vocals. Once concerts started back up they enlisted a live band; second guitarist Ian Teeple, bassist Happy Haugen and drummer Cam Sarrett. Their live sets featured the band performing choreography in matching tracksuits, marching papier mâché bug puppets around the stage, and Tramel lifting a comically large cardboard dumbbell.

The band released their debut studio album Super Snõõper with Third Man Records in July 2023, which was met with positive reception.

In October 2025 they released their second album Worldwide, again with Third Man. It was recorded with John Congleton, and used a vintage Zoom MRT-3 drum machine. The Snõõper live band now included Brad Barteau on drums and Conner Sullivan on guitar.

== Discography ==
=== Albums ===
- Super Snõõper (2023)
- Worldwide (2025)

=== Live albums ===
- Snooper Live at Exit-In (2024)

=== EPs ===
- Music for Spies (2020)
- Town Topic (2022)
- Split with Prison Affair (2024)

=== Singles ===
- "Music for Spies" (2020)
- "Microbe" (2020)
- "Bring Me Down" (2020)
- "Defect" (2020)
- "Pod" (2020)
- "Dog" (2021)
- "Fruit Fly" (2021)
- "Snooper" (2021)
- "Come Together" (2021)
- "Powerball" (2022)
- "Xerox" (2022)
- "Town Topic" (2022)
- "Inventory" (2022)
- "Waste" (2023)
- "Company Car" (2023)
- "For Yr Love" (2023)
- "Worldwide" (2025)
- "RECESS" (2026)
- "Mouth Closed" (2026)
