= Light Blue Sun =

Studio album by Lili Haydn
- Released: 2003
- Genre: Classical
- Label: BMG

Light Blue Sun is the second album by violinist/vocalist Lili Haydn. It was released in 2003 by BMG Music.

The album was rated 2.5 out of 5 stars by AllMusic.

== Track listing ==
1. Light Blue Sun (Prelude) (Lili Haydn, Corky James) 2:44
2. Come Here (Haydn, Rick Boston) 5:34
3. Anything (Haydn, Peter Rafelson) 6:08
4. Wounded Dove (Haydn) 6:55
5. The Longing (Albinoni; add. music by Haydn) 5:08
6. Denied (Lotus Weinstock) 5:42
7. The Chinese Song (add. music by Haydn) 6:26
8. Sweetness (Haydn, Jez Colin) 4:26
9. Seek (Haydn, Siri Ved K. Khalsa) 8:13
10. Home (Haydn, Tony McAnany) 6:47
11. The Promised Land (Weinstock, Haydn, Steve Nalepa) 10:23
12. Anything (radio edit) 3:39

== Musicians ==
- Lili Haydn: violin and vocals on all tracks; keyboard/programming on 4, 7, 9 and 10
- Bill Laswell: bass on 1, 3, 4, 5, 7, 9, 12
- Corky James: guitar on 1, 3, 4, 5, 7, 10, 12
- Steve Nalepa (DJ Sherlock): keyboards/ambience on 1, 4, 9, 10, 11; keyboard bass on 10; programming on 3, 9 and 12
- Karsh Kale: beat construction and additional production on 1, 5, 7; drums on 2, 4, 5 and tablas on 5, 7
- Jez Colin: programming/keyboards/ambiance on 4, 8, 10
- Satnam Singh Ramgotra: tablas on 2, 4, 7
- Goffrey Moore: guitar on 8, 10
- Pharoah Sanders: tenor saxophone on 11
- George Clinton: spoken word on 11
- Alice Coltrane: piano on 6
- Teo Castro: programming on 3, 12
- Bahar: Qawali vocal on 1
- Gerri Sutyak: cello on 3, 4 and 12
- Vanessa Freebairn-Smith: cello on 3, 4 and 12
- Alma Fernandez: viola on 3, 4 and 12
- Julianna Klopotic: violin on 6
- Ron Lawrence: viola on 6
- Tara Chambers: cello on 6
- Marius DeVries: bass and programming on 2
- Carmen Rizzo: keyboards, programming and sound design on 2
- Chris Bruce: guitar on 2
- Produced by Bill Laswell and Lili Haydn
