= Egg punk =

Punk rock subgenre

- Other names: Devo-core (early)
- Stylistic origins: Punk rock; garage punk; lo-fi music; new wave; post-punk; synth-punk
- Cultural origins: Early 2010s, Indiana
- Typical instruments: Synthesizer; electric guitar; bass guitar; drums; drum machine

Other topics
- Internet rock

Egg punk (originally known as Devo-core) is an Internet microgenre of punk rock that emerged in the 2010s. The genre came to be known as "egg punk" due to a series of internet memes. The style is characterized by a lo-fi recording style and satirical tone, influenced by new wave band Devo.

== Etymology and characteristics ==
The nomenclature of egg punk originated from a series of internet memes circulated in 2017 that proposed a spectrum of punk rock music between "egg punk" and "chain punk". The meme was intended to distinguish between the traditionalism and aggression of those deemed "chain punk" with the more experimental and satirical approach of those considered "egg punk". The satirical tone and style of egg punk has been characterized as a response to the traditional "chain punk" bands in the local scene that were viewed by some as taking their music and message too seriously.

The music of egg punk is influenced by the do-it-yourself ethos of punk subculture, characterized by the use of minimal or lo-fi recording and mixing methods and hand-drawn or collage album covers. Also known as Devo-core, the genre is heavily influenced by the music of new wave band Devo as both an aesthetic and stylistic influence.

Pitchfork described the genre as "subversive", "experimental", and typified by "wry lyrics and cheapo keyboards". John Robb wrote that the subgenre consisted of "lo-fi perfectly ‘badly’ recorded fast punk rock songs", featuring "garage melody with jitterbug jittery guitars and even sometimes cheapo synths" and oriented towards "cocking a snoop[sic] at punk’s sometimes seriousity instead embracing introvert nerds, alien noise fiends and manic goofy behaviour".

== History ==
The origins of egg punk are attributed to a community of DIY midwestern American punk rock artists from the early 2010s, including such notable bands as the Coneheads and Lumpy and the Dumpers. The microgenre encompasses a range of punk rock bands active in the early 2010s in the Midwestern United States, with central figures such as the Indiana band The Coneheads, founded in 2013 and led by Mark Winter, and St. Louis band Lumpy and the Dumpers, whose frontman, Martin Meyer, would distribute similar cassette recordings under the label Lumpy Records. Other Midwest bands adopting this approach included Uranium Club in Minneapolis and Warm Bodies in Kansas City. The genre came to be known as "egg punk" due to a series of internet memes.

The increased visibility of the egg punk scene was attributed to the distribution of rips of cassette tapes to YouTube by mononymous user Jimmy. The onset of the COVID-19 pandemic in 2020 further facilitated the spread of egg punk, as musicians had more time and fewer resources to create music, leading to greater openness to a DIY approach. Egg punk has extended outside the Midwest to several regions, including the Australian punk scene, which involves bands such as Ausmuteants, R.M.F.C., Gee Tee, Billiam and The Split Bills, Checkpoint, and Tee Vee Repairmann. Other notable artists labelled as egg punk include Snõõper, Prison Affair, Powerplant, C.C.T.V. and Landline.

== See also ==
- Lo-fi music
- Internet rock
