= Brad Wyman =

American film producer

Brad Hibbs Wyman
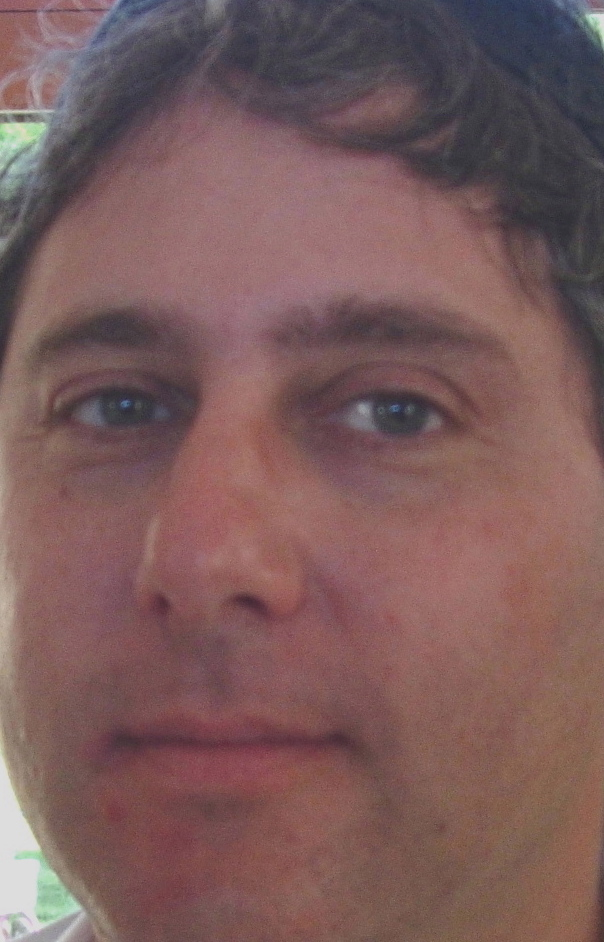
- Wyman in 2005
- Born: May 13, 1963 (age 62); Los Angeles, California, U.S.
- Occupation: Film producer

Brad Hibbs Wyman (born May 13, 1963) is an American film producer, best known for producing Monster (2003). His first film was White of the Eye, and later worked on Freeway, Trees Lounge, The Dark Backward, The Chase, Tiptoes and Barb Wire. He lives in Los Angeles, California.

== Filmography ==
He was a producer in all films unless otherwise noted.

=== Film ===
Year	Film	Credit	Notes
1987	White of the Eye		
1989	Never on Tuesday		
1990	Disturbed		
1991	The Dark Backward		
1992	The Nutt House		
1993	Skinner		
1993	Bikini Squad		
1994	The Chase		
1996	Freeway		
1996	Barb Wire		
1996	Trees Lounge		
1996	Red Ribbon Blues		
1997	This World, Then the Fireworks		
1997	Big City Blues		
1998	Girl		
1998	Denial		
1998	Susan's Plan		
1999	Freeway II: Confessions of a Trickbaby		
1999	When Autumn Leaves		
2000	Love & Sex		
2000	Mambo Café		
2003	Tiptoes	Executive producer	
2003	Monster		
2004	Method		
2004	Blessed		
2005	Snuff-Movie		
2005	The Kid & I		
2006	Hard Luck		Direct-to-video
2006	Price to Pay		
2007	Normal Adolescent Behavior		
2007	Look		
2007	Homo Erectus		
2011	Blitz		
2016	Director's Cut	Executive producer	
2023	Last Train to Fortune		
2025	Toad		

As an actor

Year	Film	Role
1990	Men at Work	Rent-a-Cop
2000	Bel Air	Manager

Production manager

Year	Film	Role
1987	Zombie High	Production supervisor

Miscellaneous crew

Year	Film	Role
1988	Jack's Back	Production executive: Cinema Group

Thanks

Year	Film	Role
1998	Welcome to Hollywood	More special thanks
1999	Palmer's Pick-Up	Very special thanks
1999	Detroit Rock City	The film-makers wish to extend their personal thanks: For their contribution to the making of this movie
2013	A Star for Rose	Special thanks

=== Television ===
Year	Title	Credit	Notes
1998	Modern Vampires		Television film
2002	Sherlock: Case of Evil	Executive producer	Television film
2005	Tommy Lee Goes to College	Executive producer	
2010	Kid Pitch	Executive producer	
2010	Fleischer's Universe	Executive producer	
2010	Look: The Series	Executive producer	
2011	Talking Who	Executive producer	
2010−11	Those Video Guys	Executive producer	
2013−15	Go Curvy	Executive producer	

As an actor

Year	Title	Role	Notes
1997	Desert's Edge	None	Television short

Thanks

Year	Film	Role	Notes
2013	3some	Special thanks	
2015	Myrna	The producers wish to thank	Television short
