= Cassian Elwes =

British film producer and talent agent

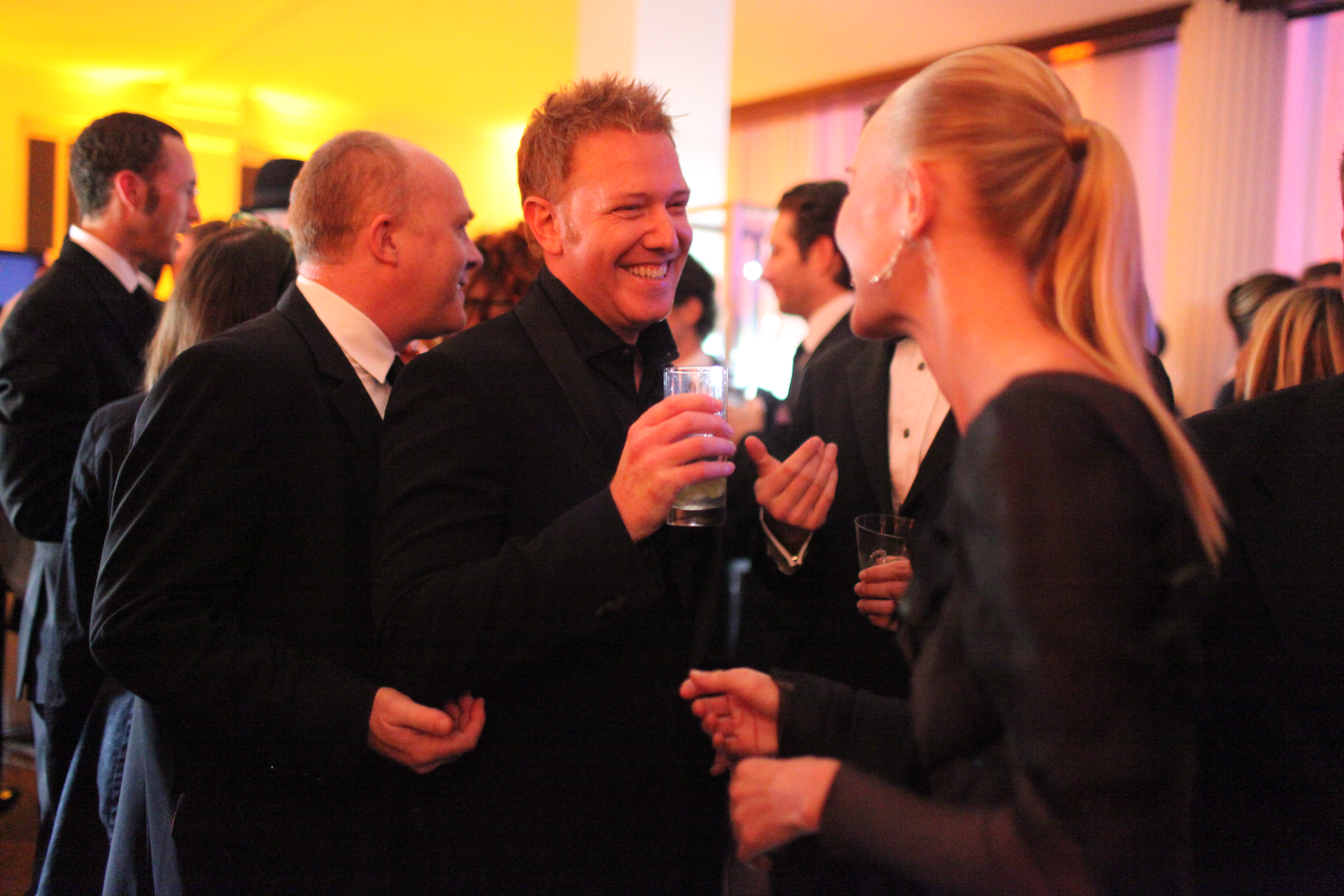
- Elwes at the 2009 Art of Elysium Heaven & Hell Gala
- Born: Cassian Elwes; 7 August 1959 (age 66); London, England
- Occupations: Film producer; talent agent
- Years active: 1984–present
- Spouses: Priscilla A. Woolworth (m. 1988; div. 2000) Holly Wiersma (m. 2006; div. 2013)
- Children: 2
- Parents: Dominick Elwes (father); Tessa Kennedy (mother)
- Relatives: Damian Elwes (brother); Cary Elwes (brother)

Cassian Elwes (born 7 August 1959) is a British independent film producer and talent agent.

== Early life and education ==
Cassian Elwes was born on 7 August 1959 in London. He is the son of Dominic Elwes, a portrait painter, and Tessa Kennedy, an interior designer. Cassian is the elder brother of actor Cary Elwes and artist Damian Elwes. Cassian is the stepson of Elliott Kastner, an American film producer.

== Career ==
Cassian Elwes began his producing career with 1984's Oxford Blues starring Rob Lowe and Ally Sheedy; he has continued enjoying success in film. His earlier roles include Men at Work with Emilio Estevez and Charlie Sheen, The Chase with Charlie Sheen, Kristy Swanson, and Henry Rollins; as well as The Dark Backward with Judd Nelson, Bill Paxton, and Rob Lowe. In 1989 he produced the independent film Never on Tuesday which featured a cast of cameos including Charlie Sheen, Emilio Estevez, Judd Nelson, Nicolas Cage, and Cary Elwes.

The Hollywood Reporter has said that Cassian Elwes was "involved in a virtual who's who of every great independent film of the last ten years" with films such as Thank You for Smoking, Half Nelson, and Frozen River (the last two of which garnered Oscar nominations for Ryan Gosling and Melissa Leo respectively).

Elwes ventured briefly into writing and directing films with the low budget 1993 independent film Blue Flame starring former child actor Kerri Green. The film was critically panned and effectively ended Green's career. His next venture came in the 2023 drama Passenger C, an independent film recreating Elwes's own experience with an unruly airline passenger and the emotional aftermath he experienced.

"What people lose sight of," Elwes said to Screen International, "is that these films cost a tenth of the films that they competed against at the Academy Awards. The privilege was the recognition."

Elwes is an expert in the field of arranging financing and distribution for independent films having done so for 283 films during his tenure at William Morris Independent.

Since leaving William Morris Independent, Elwes has been involved in arranging financing and distribution for 23 films including Lawless, directed by John Hillcoat, (The Road), starring Shia LaBeouf and Tom Hardy, and the thriller The Paperboy, directed by Lee Daniels (Precious), starring Matthew McConaughey and Zac Efron. Elwes produced the period drama The Butler, which was directed by Lee Daniels and featured an ensemble cast, including Forest Whitaker, Oprah Winfrey, John Cusack, Jane Fonda, Terrence Howard, Vanessa Redgrave, Alan Rickman, Liev Schreiber, and Robin Williams among others.

Additionally, he produced Dallas Buyers Club starring Matthew McConaughey and Jennifer Garner; Ain't Them Bodies Saints starring Rooney Mara, Casey Affleck and Ben Foster; and Hateship, Loveship starring Kristen Wiig, Guy Pearce, Hailee Steinfeld, and Nick Nolte.

On 29 October 2013, Elwes launched the Cassian Elwes Independent Screenwriter Fellowship, in conjunction with The Black List, to award one writer an all-expenses-paid trip to the 2014 Sundance Film Festival and mentorship from Elwes. Elwes and The Black List award the fellowship annually.

=== William Morris years ===
From 1994 to 2009, he co-headed William Morris Independent as an agent at The William Morris Agency, representing independent films and independent film producers; a position he held until the agency merged with Endeavor.

== Filmography ==
| Year | Title | Role | Director | With | Rotten Tomatoes |
|---|---|---|---|---|---|
| 1984 | Oxford Blues | Producer | Robert Boris | Rob Lowe, Ally Sheedy, Amanda Pays, Julian Sands, Cary Elwes, Chad Lowe, Michael Gough, Gail Strickland, Aubrey Morris | |
| 1986 | Nomads | Producer | John McTiernan | Pierce Brosnan, Lesley-Anne Down, Adam Ant, Frances Bay | 13% |
| 1986 | Heat | Producer | Dick Richards; Jerry Jameson | Burt Reynolds, Karen Young, Peter MacNicol, Howard Hesseman, Diana Scarwid | |
| 1987 | White of the Eye | Producer | Donald Cammell | David Keith, Cathy Moriarty | 33% |
| 1987 | Zombie High | Executive producer | Ron Link | Virginia Madsen, Paul Feig, Sherilyn Fenn | |
| 1988 | Jack's Back | Producer | Rowdy Herrington | James Spader | |
| 1989 | Never on Tuesday | Executive producer | Adam Rifkin | Peter Berg, Nicolas Cage, Claudia Christian, Charlie Sheen, Judd Nelson, Emilio Estevez, Cary Elwes | |
| 1989 | Warm Summer Rain | Executive producer | Joe Gayton | | |
| 1989 | Cold Feet | Producer | Robert Dornhelm | Keith Carradine, Sally Kirkland, Tom Waits, Rip Torn | |
| 1989 | Psycho Cop | Producer | Wallace Potts | | |
| 1990 | Cool Blue | Co-Producer | Mark Mullin; Richard Shepard | Woody Harrelson, Hank Azaria, Sean Penn | |
| 1990 | Men at Work | Producer | Emilio Estevez | Charlie Sheen, Emilio Estevez, Keith David, Leslie Hope | 30% |
| 1991 | 9 1/2 Ninjas! | Executive producer | Aaron Barsky | | |
| 1991 | The Dark Backward | Producer | Adam Rifkin | Judd Nelson, Bill Paxton, Wayne Newton, James Caan, Rob Lowe, Lara Flynn Boyle, Wayne Newton, Claudia Christian | 45% |
| 1991 | Liquid Dreams | Executive producer | Mark S. Manos | | |
| 1991 | Mom | Executive producer | Patrick Rand | | |
| 1992 | Love Is Like That | Executive producer | Jill Goldman | Seymour Cassel | |
| 1992 | Leather Jackets | Producer | Lee Drysdale | Bridget Fonda, D.B. Sweeney, Cary Elwes, Chris Penn, James LeGros, Jon Polito | |
| 1992 | Mad at the Moon | Producer | Martin Donovan | Fionnula Flanagan | |
| 1993 | Psycho Cop 2 | Executive producer | Adam Rifkin | | |
| 1994 | The Chase | Producer | Adam Rifkin | Charlie Sheen, Kristy Swanson, Henry Rollins, Cary Elwes, Anthony Kiedis, Flea, Claudia Christian, Ray Wise | 29% |
| 1994 | The Cool Surface | Executive producer | Erik Anjou | Robert Patrick, Teri Hatcher | |
| 1994 | Frank and Jesse | Producer | Robert Boris | Rob Lowe, Bill Paxton, Randy Travis, Alexis Arquette, William Atherton, Sean Patrick Flanery | |
| 1994 | A Brilliant Disguise | Executive producer | Nick Vallelonga | | |
| 1995 | Deep Down | Producer | John Travers | | |
| 1995 | The Girl with the Hungry Eyes | Executive producer | Jon Jacobs | | |
| 2005 | What Is It? | Executive producer | Crispin Glover | | 56% |
| 2009 | The Other Woman | Executive producer | Don Roos | Natalie Portman, Lisa Kudrow | 39% |
| 2010 | Blue Valentine | Co-executive producer | Derek Cianfrance | Ryan Gosling, Michelle Williams | 87% |
| 2010 | Henry's Crime | Executive producer | Malcolm Venville | Keanu Reeves, James Caan, Vera Farmiga | 40% |
| 2010 | The Big Bang | Executive producer | Tony Krantz | Antonio Banderas, Snoop Dogg | 13% |
| 2011 | Margin Call | Executive producer | J.C. Chandor | Kevin Spacey, Paul Bettany, Jeremy Irons, Zachary Quinto, Penn Badgley, Simon Baker, Stanley Tucci, Demi Moore, Mary McDonnell | 88% |
| 2011 | The Son of No One | Executive producer | Dito Montiel | Channing Tatum, Tracy Morgan, Katie Holmes, Ray Liotta, Juliette Binoche, Al Pacino | 16% |
| 2011 | Cats Dancing on Jupiter | Executive producer | Jordan Alan | | |
| 2011 | Sarah Palin: You Betcha! | Producer | Nick Broomfield; Joan Churchill | | 30% |
| 2011 | Catch .44 | Executive producer | Aaron Harvey | Malin Åkerman, Forest Whitaker, Bruce Willis | |
| 2012 | The Words | Executive producer | Brian Klugman; Lee Sternthal | Bradley Cooper, Zoe Saldaña, Olivia Wilde, Jeremy Irons, Ben Barnes, Dennis Quaid, J. K. Simmons | 22% |
| 2012 | Lawless | Executive producer | John Hillcoat | Shia LaBeouf, Tom Hardy, Jason Clarke, Jessica Chastain, Guy Pearce, Mia Wasikowska, Gary Oldman | 67% |
| 2012 | The Paperboy | Producer | Lee Daniels | Matthew McConaughey, Zac Efron, David Oyelowo, Macy Gray, John Cusack, Nicole Kidman | 43% |
| 2012 | Generation Um... | Executive producer | Mark Mann | Keanu Reeves | 0% |
| 2012 | Stolen | Executive producer | Simon West | Nicolas Cage, Malin Åkerman, Bruce Willis | 16% |
| 2013 | Ain't Them Bodies Saints | Producer | David Lowery | Casey Affleck, Rooney Mara, Ben Foster | 81% |
| 2013 | All Is Lost | Executive producer | J. C. Chandor | Robert Redford | 94% |
| 2013 | The Butler | Producer | Lee Daniels | Forest Whitaker, Oprah Winfrey, David Oyelowo, Mariah Carey, Terrence Howard, Alex Pettyfer, Vanessa Redgrave, Cuba Gooding, Jr., Lenny Kravitz, Robin Williams, Liev Schreiber, John Cusack, Alan Rickman, Jane Fonda | 73% |
| 2013 | Dallas Buyers Club | Executive producer | Jean-Marc Vallée | Matthew McConaughey, Jennifer Garner, Jared Leto, Steve Zahn | 94% |
| 2014 | She's Funny That Way | Executive producer | Peter Bogdanovich | Owen Wilson, Jennifer Aniston, Imogen Poots, Kathryn Hahn, Will Forte, Rhys Ifans, Cybill Shepherd, Ahna O'Reilly, Joanna Lumley, Lucy Punch | |
| 2014 | A Case of You | Executive producer | Kat Coiro | Justin Long, Evan Rachel Wood, Sam Rockwell, Sienna Miller, Brendan Fraser, Vince Vaughn, Peter Dinklage | 40% |
| 2014 | Hateship, Loveship | Producer | Liza Johnson | Kristen Wiig, Hailee Steinfeld, Guy Pearce, Christine Lahti | 57% |
| 2014 | Reach Me | Producer | John Herzfeld | Sylvester Stallone, Kyra Sedgwick, Thomas Jane, Tom Berenger, Cary Elwes, Kelsey Grammer, Danny Trejo, Danny Aiello, Tom Sizemore | |
| 2014 | Parts per Billion | Executive producer | Brian Horiuchi | Josh Hartnett, Rosario Dawson, Teresa Palmer, Penn Badgley, Gena Rowlands | |
| 2014 | Black and White | Executive producer | Mike Binder | Kevin Costner, Octavia Spencer | |
| 2014 | We'll Never Have Paris | Executive producer | Simon Helberg; Jocelyn Towne | Melanie Lynskey, Simon Helberg, Zachary Quinto, Maggie Grace | |
| 2014 | Midnight Man | Executive producer | Rob Kennedy | | |
| 2014 | Theo | Executive producer | Ezna Sands | | |
| 2014 | Shreveport | Executive producer | Ryan Phillippe | Ryan Phillippe | |
| 2014 | Shelter | Executive producer | Paul Bettany | Jennifer Connelly, Anthony Mackie | |
| 2014 | I Origins | Co-executive producer | Mike Cahill | Michael Pitt, Brit Marling | |
| 2014 | Burying the Ex | Executive producer | Joe Dante | Anton Yelchin, Alexandra Daddario | |
| 2015 | Queen of the Desert | Producer | Werner Herzog | Nicole Kidman, James Franco, Robert Pattinson | |
| 2015 | Submerged | Executive producer | Steven C. Miller | Talullah Riley | |
| 2015 | The Knife Thrower | Executive producer | Terry Nemeroff | Jason Flemyng, Lars Mikkelsen, Patrick Bauchau, Peter Stormare, Ray Winstone, Til Schweiger, Jon Gries | |
| 2015 | Knock Knock | Executive producer | Eli Roth | Keanu Reeves, Lorenza Izzo, Ana de Armas | |
| 2016 | Elvis & Nixon | Producer | Liza Johnson | | |
| 2017 | Mudbound | Producer | Dee Rees | Garrett Hedlund, Carey Mulligan | 97% |
| 2018 | The Con Is On | Producer | James Oakley | | |
| 2018 | Siberia | Executive producer | Matthew Ross | | 7% |
| 2018 | Billionaire Boys Club | Producer | James Cox | | 13% |
| 2020 | The Last Thing He Wanted | Producer | Dee Rees | | |
| 2021 | Crisis | Producer | Nicholas Jarecki | | |
| 2021 | Best Sellers | Producer | Lina Roessler | | |
| 2021 | Violet | Executive producer | Justine Bateman | | |
| 2022 | 9 Bullets | Producer | Gigi Gaston | | |
| 2022 | Medieval | Producer | Petr Jákl | | |
| 2023 | Desperation Road | Producer | Nadine Crocker | Garrett Hedlund, Mel Gibson | |
| 2025 | Hurricanna | Producer | Francesca Gregorini | Sylvia Hoeks, Holly Hunter, Mark Duplass, Nicholas Hamilton, Kevin Sussman, Michael Nouri | |
| 2025 | Bride Hard | Producer | Simon West | | |
| 2025 | Dead Man's Wire | Producer | Gus Van Sant | | |

== Ancestry ==
Ancestors of Cassian Elwes

16. Valentine Dudley Henry Cary-Elwes
8. Gervase Henry Cary-Elwes
17. Alice Geraldine Ward
4. Simon Edmund Vincent Paul Elwes
18. Rudolph William Basil Feilding, 8th Earl of Denbigh, 7th Earl of Desmond
9. Lady Winefride Mary (Mary Winifride) Elizabeth Feilding
19. Mary Berkeley
2. Bede Evelyn Dominick Elwes
20. James Rennell Rodd
10. James Rennell Rodd, 1st Baron Rennell
21. Elizabeth Anne Thomson
5. Hon. Gloria Ellinor Rodd
22. James Alexander Guthrie
11. Lilias Georgina Guthrie
23. Elinor Stirling
1. Cassian Elwes
24. Sir Alexander Blackie William Kennedy
12. Sir John Macfarlane Kennedy
25. Elizabeth Verralls Smith
6. Geoffrey Alexander Farrer Kennedy
26. Thomas Charles Farrer
13. Dorothy Farrer
27. Ann Richards McLane
3. Tessa Georgina Kennedy
28. Ivan Ivanovic
14. Ivan Rikard Mendel Kraus, alias Ivan Rikard Ivanović
29. Bettina
7. Daška Marija Ivanović-Banac
30. Stevan Popović
15. Milica Popović
31. Bella Nikolajevic
