= Adam Rifkin =

American film director

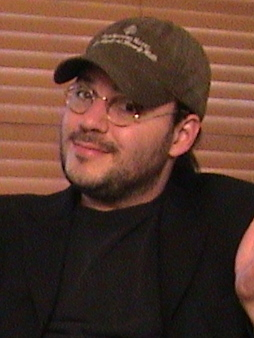
- Rifkin in 2010
- Born: December 31, 1966 (age 59); Chicago, Illinois, United States
- Other name: Rif Coogan
- Occupations: Film director, screenwriter, producer, actor

Adam Rifkin (born December 31, 1966) is an American filmmaker and actor. His career ranges from broad family comedies to dark and gritty urban dramas. He is best known for writing or co-writing family-friendly comedies like Mouse Hunt and 2007's Underdog.

== Early life and education ==
A native of Chicago, Illinois, Rifkin graduated from the Chicago Academy for the Arts in 1984, after which he moved to Los Angeles. He attended the University of Southern California for one year before dropping out. He then began writing scripts and collaborating with Brad Wyman.

== Career ==
As a screenwriter, Rifkin has written several family-friendly movies. He wrote Knucklehead for WWE Studios, starring WWE star Big Show, Underdog for Walt Disney Pictures, Zoom, starring Tim Allen and two films for DreamWorks, Mouse Hunt and Small Soldiers. Continuing in the family film genre, he wrote an unmade big screen version of He-Man for John Woo and 20th Century Fox, that was abandoned by Fox 2000 Pictures. He also wrote the unused draft of Planet of the Apes in 1988.

Rifkin's film The Dark Backward was named one of the top ten films of its year by The New York Post. He was then the director responsible for New Line Cinema's Detroit Rock City.

=== Directing ===
Rifkin directed his first film Never on Tuesday in 1989. As of December 6, 2007, he has directed eleven others, including The Chase (1994), Detroit Rock City (1999) and the Night at the Golden Eagle (2002).

=== Production ===
Rifkin began his production career in 1999 on the production of Touch Me in the Morning by Giuseppe Andrews. Preceding his completion of that project, Rifkin produced his own film Night at the Golden Eagle as well as Getting Hal by Tony Markes.

=== Acting ===
Rifkin began his acting career in 1989 with his directorial debut Never on Tuesday. Rifkin has appeared in small roles and cameos in his other films, Night at the Golden Eagle, Without Charlie, Detroit Rock City, The Dark Backward, Denial and Psycho Cop 2. Rifkin also appeared as Croaker/Miss Spain in the 1989 film, Going Overboard, starring Adam Sandler and Burt Young.

He also wrote, directed and acted in the 2007 film Homo Erectus, in which he portrays a wimpy caveman called Ishbo, the main character in the film. The film's ensemble cast includes Ali Larter, David Carradine, Talia Shire, Gary Busey, and Ron Jeremy.

== Filmography ==
=== Film ===
Year	Title	Director	Writer	Producer	Notes
1989	Never on Tuesday	Yes	Yes	No	
1989	Going Overboard	No	Uncredited	Co-producer	
1989	Tale of Two Sisters	Yes	No	No	
1990	The Invisible Maniac	Yes	Yes	No	Credited as "Rif Coogan"
1991	The Dark Backward	Yes	Yes	No	
1992	The Nutt House	Yes	No	No	
1993	Psycho Cop 2	Yes	No	No	Credited as "Rif Coogan"
1994	The Chase	Yes	Yes	No	
1997	Mouse Hunt	No	Yes	No	
1998	Denial	Yes	Yes	No	
1998	Small Soldiers	No	Yes	No	
1998	Welcome to Hollywood	Yes	Yes	No	Co-directed with Tony Markes
1999	Detroit Rock City	Yes	No	No	
2001	Without Charlie	Yes	Yes	No	
2001	Night at the Golden Eagle	Yes	Yes	Yes	
2006	Zoom	No	Yes	No	
2007	Homo Erectus	Yes	Yes	No	
2007	Look	Yes	Yes	No	
2007	Underdog	No	Yes	No	
2010	Knucklehead	No	Yes	No	
2011	Chillerama	Yes	Yes	Executive	Segment "Wadzilla"
2015	Shooting the Warwicks	Yes	Yes	Yes	
2016	Director's Cut	Yes	No	Yes	
2017	The Last Movie Star	Yes	Yes	Yes	
2021	Willy's Wonderland	No	No	Executive	
2023	The Adam Rifkin Film Festival	Yes	Yes	Yes	Compilation of short films made from 1975 to 1987
2025	Last Train to Fortune	Yes	No	Yes	

Acting credits

Year	Title	Role	Notes
1984	Sixteen Candles	Head Nerd	Uncredited
1989	Never on Tuesday	William	Uncredited
1989	Going Overboard	Croaker / Miss Spain	
1990	Disturbed	Gary	
1991	The Dark Backward	Rufus Bing	
1991	Bikini Island	Desk Boy	Credited as Rif Coogan
1992	Last Dance	Mark	Credited as Rif Coogan
1993	Psycho Cop 2	Man with Video Camera	
1993	The Flesh Merchant	Man In Bondage Room	
1993	Bikini Squad	Singing Teacher	Credited as Rif Coogan
1998	Denial	Reuben	
1998	Susan's Plan	Gambler #1	
1998	Welcome to Hollywood	Himself	
1999	Detroit Rock City	It's Raining Men Billboard Model	Uncredited
2001	Without Charlie	Norman	
2001	Night at the Golden Eagle	Man in Private Booth	Uncredited
2007	Homo Erectus	Ishbo	
2011	Chillerama	Miles Munson	Segment "Wadzilla"
2015	Shooting the Warwicks	Mickey Wagner	
2016	Director's Cut	Himself	

Documentary film

Year	Title	Director	Producer
1999	Touch Me in the Morning	No	Yes
2004	Babysitter	No	Yes
2006	Jacuzzi Rooms	No	Yes
2007	Garbanzo Gas	No	Yes
2014	Giuseppe Makes a Movie	Yes	Yes

=== Television ===
Year	Title	Director	Writer	Executive Producer	Creator
1996	Bone Chillers	Yes	Yes	Co-Executive	Yes
2010	Look: The Series	Yes	Yes	Yes	Yes
2012	Reality Show	Yes	Yes	Yes	No
