= Never on Tuesday =

1988 film by Adam Rifkin

- Directed by: Adam Rifkin
- Written by: Adam Rifkin
- Produced by: Cassian Elwes; Elliott Kastner
- Starring: Claudia Christian; Andrew Lauer; Peter Berg; Nicolas Cage; Cary Elwes; Emilio Estevez; Judd Nelson; Charlie Sheen
- Cinematography: Alan Jones
- Edited by: Ed Rothkowitz
- Music by: Richard Stone
- Distributed by: Palisades Entertainment
- Release date: September 13, 1989
- Running time: 90 minutes
- Country: United States
- Language: English

Never on Tuesday is a 1989 American comedy film written and directed by Adam Rifkin. The film was released on VHS video rental by Paramount Home Entertainment in 1989 and was originally slated to be re-released in the United States on DVD format through City Lights Entertainment before the company went out of business.

== Plot ==
Three people are stranded in the desert after Matt and Eddie total Tuesday's automobile. Tuesday is a lesbian; she is attractive, intelligent, and good natured. She is a woman with ambition and Matt and Eddie do not factor into her plans for her future. Exhibiting an immediate sexual interest in the beautiful Tuesday, the guys begin their efforts to bring her around to being attracted to one of them.

== Cast ==
- Claudia Christian as Tuesday
- Andrew Lauer as Matt
- Peter Berg as Eddie
- Dave Anderson as Zombie
- Mark Garbarino as Zombie
- Melvyn Pearls as Zombie
- Brett Seals as Zombie
- Nicolas Cage as Man in Red Sports Car (uncredited)
- Cary Elwes as Tow Truck Driver (uncredited)
- Emilio Estevez as Tow Truck Driver (uncredited)
- Judd Nelson as Motorcycle Cop (uncredited)
- Charlie Sheen as Thief (uncredited)
- Adam Rifkin as William (uncredited)
- Gilbert Gottfried as Lucky Larry Lupin (uncredited)

== Filming ==
The film was financed by Elliot Kastner.

Filming for Never on Tuesday took place in Borrego Springs, California. The cameo actors were flown out to Borrego Springs on their individual filming days including Charlie Sheen - who had just finished filming Wall Street - and Cary Elwes. The film's crew members included producer Cassian Elwes (brother of Cary) and make up artist Sheryl Berkoff. With a limited budget the cast and crew shot on film; they used 'short ends'– sections of film left over in the canister – cheap to buy but with limited use. Christian says: 'we were constantly trying to shove a 4-minute scene into a 2-minute film stock!'

Never on Tuesday is Rifkin's directorial debut, an independent film with a small cast that features cameos from many of Rifkin's mainstays such as Cary Elwes, Judd Nelson, and Charlie Sheen. Executive Producer Cassian Elwes also worked with Rifkin on The Chase and The Dark Backward.
