= Tom Hodges (actor) =

American actor (b. 1965)

- Born: July 1, 1965 (age 61); Chicago, Illinois, U.S.
- Occupations: Actor; producer
- Years active: 1985–present

Thomas E. Hodges (born July 1, 1965) is an American actor and film producer, famous for roles such as Bruno in the 1986 teen film Lucas, and Rich in the NBC (later CBS) series The Hogan Family.

== Career ==
Hodges appeared in such films as 1987's Revenge of the Nerds II: Nerds in Paradise, 1988's Critters 2: The Main Course, 1989's Going Overboard and Steel Magnolias and 1995's Heavyweights. Hodges was also in the movie Look.

Hodges co-wrote the season six episode of The Hogan Family titled "Best of Friends, Worst of Times", in which his character Rich revealed that he was battling the effects of AIDS.

== Filmography ==
=== Film ===
Year	Title	Role	Notes
1986	Lucas	Bruno	
1987	Revenge of the Nerds II: Nerds in Paradise	Tiny	
1988	Critters 2: The Main Course	Wesley	
1989	Tale of Two Sisters	Aunt Sparkle / Butler	
1989	Going Overboard	Bob / Schecky's Mother	
1989	Steel Magnolias	Louie Jones	
1991	The Dark Backward	Marjorie Zipp	
1991	Frame Up	Don Curran	
1993	The Baby Doll Murders	Les Parker	
1993	Excessive Force	Dylan	
1995	Heavyweights	Lars	
1995	The Killers Within	Fred	
1996	Michael	Groom	
1997	I Love You, Don't Touch Me!	Asshole #3	
1998	Judas Kiss	Jake	
1999	Stigmata	ER Nurse	
2007	Homo Erectus	Bork	
2007	Look	Stuart	
2007	The Grand	Tim Woolrich	
2012	Overnight	Eric	

=== Television ===
Year	Title	Role	Notes
1985	Airwolf	Hal	Episode: "Where Have All the Children Gone?"
1986	Amazing Stories	Tiny	Episode: "No Day at the Beach"
1986	L.A. Law	Not Kuzak	Episode: "Gibbon Take"
1986–1990	The Hogan Family	Rich	30 episodes
1987	Night of Courage	Rob	Television film
1987	The Facts of Life	Ernie	Episode: "A Winter's Tale"
1987	The Wizard	Cole	Episode: "Papa Simon"
1987	Highway to Heaven	Mike Parker	Episode: "In with the 'In' Crowd"
1988	Vietnam War Story	Dale Destel	Episode: "Dusk to Dawn"
1988	ABC Afterschool Special	Tom	Episode: "A Family Again"
1989	China Beach	Corporal Nichols	Episode: "Who's Happy Now?"
1990	Tour of Duty	Alexander Duckworth	Episode: "Vietnam Rag"
1990	Equal Justice	Mark	Episode: "Start of the Fire"
1992	In the Best Interest of the Children	Ray Jacobs	Television film
1992, 1993	Nurses	Carl Slotkin	2 episodes
1993	They've Taken Our Children	Jim Schoenfeld	Television film
1993	The Disappearance of Christina	Manager	Television film
1993	Walker, Texas Ranger	Billy Clancy	Episode: "Crime Wave Dave"
1994	Blind Justice	Soldier #2	Television film
1996	JAG	Lieutenant Hogan	Episode: "High Ground"
1997	Mad About You	Pool Player #3	Episode: "On the Road"
1997	Star Trek: Deep Space Nine	Penchetti	Episode: "Empok Nor"
1997	Dr. Quinn, Medicine Woman	Mr. Copely	Episode: "Civil Wars"
1998	Since You've Been Gone	Pat Prince	Television film
1998	Touched by an Angel	Jasper	Episode: "An Angel on the Roof"
1999	Late Last Night	Passenger Cop	Television film
