= Hayes MacArthur =

American comedian and actor (born 1977)

- Born: April 16, 1977 (age 49); Chicago, Illinois
- Occupations: Actor; comedian; screenwriter
- Years active: 2003–present
- Spouse: Ali Larter (m. 2009)
- Children: 2
- Relatives: Scott MacArthur (brother); William F. Farley (step-father)

Hayes MacArthur (born April 16, 1977) is an American actor and stand-up comedian. He starred in the TBS comedy series Angie Tribeca.

== Early life ==
MacArthur is the son of Bruce and Shelley MacArthur. His stepfather is businessman William F. Farley. His younger brother is fellow actor and writer Scott MacArthur.

MacArthur attended Deerfield Academy and received a B.A. in Government from Bowdoin College in Brunswick, Maine, where he was quarterback on the football team. He has studied at the Groundlings Theater Company and Atlantic Theater Company.

== Acting career ==
MacArthur took first place at the 2003 Rebels of Comedy Competition. He has appeared on such TV shows as Mad TV, Comedy Central's Premium Blend, Pushing Daisies, and Medium.

In 2005, MacArthur co-wrote, produced and starred in a 16-minute short film, The Adventures of Big Handsome Guy and His Little Friend, with Jason Winer. The short was produced as a pilot for TV in 2006. He also appeared as a waiter in the episode of Curb Your Enthusiasm where everyone chooses Larry's wife over him after the break-up. In 2007, MacArthur appeared with fiancée Ali Larter in National Lampoon's Homo Erectus, and also appeared in a comedic supporting role in the Disney movie The Game Plan. Along with recurring roles on the television shows How I Met Your Mother and Worst Week, he appeared in supporting roles in the 2010 films She's Out of My League and Life as We Know It.

In May 2010, NBC announced that MacArthur would star in the television series Perfect Couples. The half-hour romantic comedy premiered in the second half of the 2010–2011 TV season. The show was cancelled in May 2011.

In 2012, MacArthur was featured in several episodes of Whitney, as well as Go On and the Broken Lizard film The Babymakers.

He acted as the male lead for three seasons opposite Rashida Jones in Angie Tribeca on TBS, created by Steve Carell.

He was a series regular alongside Dennis Quaid in television show Merry Happy Whatever for Netflix. The show was created by Tucker Cawley, best known for writing episodes of Everybody Loves Raymond. He appeared in a guest star role on The Morning Show on Apple TV+ and as a guest lead on the Hulu anthology Into the Dark.

MacArthur appeared in the films Super Troopers 2, with the Broken Lizard comedy team and Brian Cox, and Bobby Farrelly's Paramount film Dear Santa, starring opposite Jack Black.

He is a series regular in the upcoming Amazon series The Runarounds from the creators of Outer Banks.

== Personal life ==
MacArthur's first name was in honor of his great-aunt, actress Helen Hayes, who was married to Charles MacArthur, his grandfather Alexander MacArthur's brother. His grandfather's other brother, John D. MacArthur, was an insurance-company owner and executive, and founded the John D. and Catherine T. MacArthur Foundation, the benefactor of the MacArthur Fellowships.

MacArthur became engaged to actress Ali Larter, his girlfriend of three years, in December 2007. On August 1, 2009, MacArthur married Larter in a small ceremony at his parents' estate in Kennebunk, Maine. On July 20, 2010, it was announced that the couple were expecting their first child. Larter and MacArthur have a son born in 2010 and a daughter born in 2015. As of 2013, the couple also had two dogs, Jackpot and Ella.

MacArthur volunteers and serves on the board of directors of Higher Ground USA, a charity that provides recreational therapy for military veterans, first responders, and people with disabilities. In 2014, MacArthur, alongside Larter, was awarded "The Spirit of Elysium" Award. The award is given to an artist that has shown consistency in volunteering for The Art of Elysium, a Los Angeles based charity that provides acting, art, comedy, music, and creative writing workshops for ill children confined to long term stays in hospitals.

== Filmography ==
Film
Year	Title	Role	Notes
2005	Open Mike	Mike Sheppard	Short film
2007	Homo Erectus	Thudnik	
2007	Are We Done Yet?	Jimmy the Bartender	
2007	Look	Tony Gilbert	
2007	The Game Plan	Kyle Cooper	
2008	Lower Learning	Digdug O'Shaughnessy	
2010	Life as We Know It	Peter Novak	
2010	She's Out of My League	Ron	
2011	Answers to Nothing	Taylor	
2012	Bachelorette	Dale	
2012	The Babymakers	Leslie Jenkins	
2012	Jewtopia	Chuck O'Connell	
2012	The Motel Life	Officer Cook	
2013	Another Happy Anniversary	Tom	Short film
2014	Someone Marry Barry	Rafe	
2014	A Haunted House 2	Ned	
2016	Director's Cut	Reed/Himself	
2018	Being Frank	Stan Kempler	
2018	Super Troopers 2	Mountie Henri Podien	
2019	Ode to Joy	Jordan	
2020	The Way Back	Eric	
2020	The Binge	Pompano Mike	
2024	Dear Santa	Bill Turner	
2026	A Love Like This	Paul	

Television
Year	Title	Role	Notes
2005	The King of Queens	Ed	Episode: "Pole Lox"
2005	Medium	Randy Pilgrim	Episode: "Dead Aim"
2005	Wiener Park	Dusty Wurtman	TV film
2006	The Adventures of Big Handsome Guy and His Little Friend	Guy Hansen	TV film
2006	Thick and Thin	Greg	Episode: "Mary Moves On"
2007	Atlanta	Todd	TV film
2007	Curb Your Enthusiasm	Doorman	Episode: "The TiVo Guy"
2007, 2009	How I Met Your Mother	Curt 'The Ironman' Irons	Episodes: "The Platinum Rule" and "Sorry, Bro"
2008	My Boys	Spike Upton	Episode: "The Shirt Contest"
2008	Entourage	Levinson	Episode: "Gotta Look Up to Get Down"
2008	Pushing Daisies	Buddy Amicus	Episode: "Frescorts"
2008–09	Worst Week	Chad	5 episodes
2010–11	Perfect Couples	Rex	Series regular, 14 episodes
2011	Happy Endings	Steven	Episode: "The Code War"
2012	Suburgatory	Walter	Episode: "Driving Miss Dalia"
2012	Whitney	Lance	Episodes: "Lance" and "48 Hours"
2012–13	Go On	Wyatt Achenbach	Recurring role; 7 episodes
2014	The Rebels	Rick Massella	Episode: "Pilot"
2014	Friends with Better Lives	Zac	Episode: "Cyrano de Trainer-Zac"
2015	Looking	Barry Foster	Episode: "Looking for a Plot"
2016–17	Angie Tribeca	Jay Geils	Series regular, 30 episodes
2019	Into the Dark	Chester Conklin	Episode: "I'm Just F*cking with You"
2019	Mr. Mom	Greg Anderson	Series regular, 11 episodes
2019	Single Parents	Xander Fogerty	Episode: "Xander and Camille"
2019	Merry Happy Whatever	Sean Quinn	Series regular, 8 episodes
2019	The Morning Show	Marlon Tate	Episode: "The Interview"
2020	Schooled	Greg	Episode: "Garden Party"
2023	History of the World, Part II	Saint Mark	Episode: "VIII"
2025	The Runarounds		Series regular
