= Night at the Golden Eagle =

2001 film by Adam Rifkin

- Theatrical release poster
- Directed by: Adam Rifkin
- Written by: Adam Rifkin
- Produced by: Steve Bing; Adam Rifkin
- Starring: Donnie Montemarano; Vinny Argiro; Natasha Lyonne
- Cinematography: Francesco Varese
- Edited by: Peter Schink
- Music by: Tyler Bates
- Production company: Shangri-La Entertainment
- Distributed by: Keystone Entertainment
- Release dates: November 2001 (London Film Festival); April 26, 2002
- Running time: 87 minutes
- Country: United States
- Language: English

Night at the Golden Eagle is a 2001 American crime drama film written and directed by Adam Rifkin. The low-budget film was a box office bomb, earning about $18,000 against a budget of $1 million.

== Plot ==
Two elderly criminals spend their final night in Los Angeles, California at the Golden Eagle Hotel prior to their departure to Las Vegas, Nevada, to lead a life without crime. Unfortunately, on the hottest night of the summer, these two ex-criminals seemingly get caught in the malice of prostitutes, pimps, drunken bums, fighting monkeys, and young runaways.

== Cast ==
- Donnie Montemarano as Tommy
- Vinny Argiro as Mick
- Natasha Lyonne as Amber
- Vinnie Jones as Rodan
- Ann Magnuson as Sally
- Nicole Jacobs as Loriann
- Fayard Nicholas as Mr. Maynard
- Sam Moore as Sylvester
- Badja Djola as Gabriel
- Kitten Natividad as Ruby
- Ron Jeremy as Ray
- James Caan as Prison Warden (uncredited)
- Bunny Summers as Waitress
- Adam Rifkin as Man In Private Booth (uncredited)
