= Tale of Two Sisters =

- DVD cover
- Directed by: Adam Rifkin
- Written by: Charlie Sheen (poems)
- Produced by: Lawrence Bender; Randolf Turrow
- Starring: Claudia Christian; Valerie Breiman; Peter Berg
- Narrated by: Charlie Sheen
- Cinematography: John F.K. Parenteau
- Edited by: King Wilder
- Music by: Marc David Decker
- Distributed by: Troma Entertainment
- Release date: 1989
- Running time: 89 min.
- Country: United States
- Language: English

Tale of Two Sisters is a 1989 drama film about two sisters who, having not seen each other for 5 years, catch up and relive childhood experiences. It is directed by Adam Rifkin and narrated by Charlie Sheen, and stars Claudia Christian and Valerie Breiman as the two sisters.

== Premise ==
Phil resents her sister Liz for being the focus of their mother's love and has not spoken to her since she attended Liz's wedding. Years later Phil visits Liz at her expensive home where she lives with their parents and the two argue over their feelings about each other.

== Cast ==
- Claudia Christian as Elizabeth "Liz"
- Valerie Breiman as Phil
- Tom Hodges as Aunt Sparkle / Butler
- Robert Munic as Prince / Jester
- Jeff Conaway as Taxi driver
- Sydney Lassick as Dad
- Dee Coppola as Mom
- Peter Berg as Gardener
- Laurianne Jamison as Housekeeper / murderous woman on beach
- Danielle von Zerneck as Adult bug girl
- Charity Katz as Young Elizabeth "Liz"
- Raeanah Turrow as Young Phyllis
- Samantha Hallie Culp as Young Bug Girl
- Brian Belknap as Grave Digger
- Craig Stark as Elizabeth's Lover
- Hastie Purchase as Chacha
- Raisa Slepoy as Russian Maid
- Beau Jack as Algebra Teacher
- Lawrence Bender as Thug #1
- Harvey S. Seymour as Butcher
- Matt O'Toole as Thug #2
- Robert Paul Munich as Jester
- Buddy Daniels as Meanie the Clown
- Michele Barinholtz as Gum Chewing Broad
- Schmol Stinkystein as himself
- Dean Mynerd as Mime
- Reggie Springer as Dad's Singing Dog
- Bunker Pug as Mom's Dog
- Charlie as Liz's Cat
- Chuck Borden - Stunt Coordinator
