= Going Overboard =

1989 film by Valerie Breiman

- DVD cover
- Directed by: Valerie Breiman
- Written by: Valerie Breiman
- Produced by: Mark Daniel Jones; Adam Rifkin
- Starring: Adam Sandler; Burt Young; Terry Moore; Billy Zane; Lisa Collins Zane; Pete Berg; Tom Hodges; Scott LaRose
- Cinematography: Ron Jacobs
- Edited by: Randy D. Wiles
- Music by: Steven "Scooby" Scott Smalley
- Production company: L.A. Dreams Productions
- Distributed by: Theater Technologies, Inc. Vidmark Entertainment
- Release date: October 27, 1989
- Running time: 97 minutes
- Country: United States
- Language: English
- Budget: $800,000

Going Overboard is a 1989 American comedy film written and directed by Valerie Breiman, and starring Adam Sandler in his film debut, Burt Young, Allen Covert, Billy Zane, Terry Moore, Milton Berle, and Billy Bob Thornton in a small role. It was released on October 27, 1989. The film was also released by Vidmark Entertainment in 1995. Sandler would later have a breakout role for the film Billy Madison after working on Saturday Night Live.

== Plot ==
Shecky Moskowitz is a struggling comedian working on a cruise ship. Shecky gets his chance to be the ship's comedian when it is thought that the regular insult comedian, Dickie Diamond, had fallen overboard and drowned. (Dickie actually locked himself in the men's room.) Shecky is nervous about performing, but King Neptune convinces him to go for the opportunity by telling Shecky about the power of laughter. Shecky's first performance is very unsuccessful as he is booed off the stage, he is especially heckled by the construction worker Dave. However, after a lecture by Milton Berle, Shecky succeeds in making the audience laugh. At that point, two terrorists sent by General Noriega come on board and want to kill Miss Australia after she insulted him. Shecky, remembering the advice about the power of laughter, saves her by promising to put the assassins in a film. Dickie pleads to God for mercy and the men's room door is unlocked; he quickly blasphemes as an insult to God and returns to his performance, but the people no longer like him. The film ends with everyone dancing and Noriega setting off a bomb.

== Cast ==
- Adam Sandler as Shecky Moskowitz
- Tom Hodges as Bob
- Lisa Collins as Ellen
- Scott LaRose as Dickie Diamond
- Burt Young as General Noriega
- Adam Rifkin as Croaker / Miss Spain
- Peter Berg as Mort Ginsberg
- Ricky Paull Goldin as Achmed
- Warren Selko as Ekebem
- Allen Covert as The Bartender
- Billy Zane as King Neptune
- Terry Moore as Mistress
- Milton Berle as himself
- Billy Bob Thornton as Dave
- Steven Brill as Priest
- Gabe Sachs as Funeral Moaner

== Production ==
A week before filming began, 22-year-old Adam Sandler was cast in Going Overboard after some crew members saw him performing comedy at The Improv in Los Angeles. After a show, they approached him and offered him the role outright. The original working title of the film was The Unsinkable Shecky Moskowitz, before alternating to Babes Ahoy as the script title, until finally releasing as Going Overboard.

== Reception ==
On Rotten Tomatoes, the film has three (previously four) reviews listed, all of which are negative.

David Nusair of Reel Film Reviews gave it zero out of four, and called it "...a slapdash and thoroughly amateurish piece of work that suffers from a total dearth of positive attributes." J.R. Taylor of Entertainment Weekly gave it a grade D.
