= Susan's Plan =

- DVD cover
- Directed by: John Landis
- Written by: John Landis
- Produced by: Leslie Belzberg; John Landis; Brad Wyman
- Starring: Nastassja Kinski; Billy Zane; Michael Biehn; Rob Schneider; Lara Flynn Boyle; Carl Ballantine; Thomas Haden Church; Bill Duke; Lisa Edelstein; Sheree North; Adrian Paul; Dan Aykroyd
- Cinematography: Ken Kelsch
- Edited by: Nancy Morrison
- Music by: Peter Bernstein
- Production company: The Kushner-Locke Company
- Distributed by: Edge Entertainment
- Release dates: October 29, 1998 (AFI Film Festival); March 14, 2000 (Video)
- Running time: 89 minutes
- Country: United States
- Language: English
- Budget: $3 million

Susan's Plan (also released as Dying to Get Rich on video) is a 1998 American black comedy film written and directed by John Landis and starring Nastassja Kinski, Dan Aykroyd, Billy Zane, Rob Schneider, Lara Flynn Boyle and Michael Biehn. The plot revolves around Susan Holland (Kinski)'s plan to kill her former husband Paul with the help of a group of misfits and collect his life insurance.

The film was screened at the AFI Film Festival in 1998, but due to poor audience reactions, Susan's Plan was released straight to video in 2000 by Full Moon Features, under the Edge Entertainment label.

== Plot ==
Susan Holland is a suburbanite woman who plots to kill her wealthy husband Paul in order to collect his life insurance policy. Through Susan's adulterous lover, Sam Meyers, she hires two incompetent criminals, Bill and Steve, to kill Paul and make it look like a mugging gone wrong. However, when Bill and Steve show up as expected and shoot Paul outside his car in a parking lot, Paul survives and is taken to the hospital.

Undaunted, Susan insists on continuing with her plans to kill Paul by hiring a biker, Bob, to carry out the deed while Paul is recovering in the hospital. Bob enlists a former prostitute, named Betty Johnson, to seduce Dr. Chris Stillman, the doctor treating Paul, to have the doctor move Paul to a private hospital room for Bob to isolate and kill Paul.

However, Susan's plan starts to unravel when a suspicious police detective, Detective Scott, begins to suspect her of having a hand in the attempt on Paul's life, and Sam's ex-wife, Penny, learns about the plot and wants in on part of Paul's life insurance money. Both Bill and Steve continue to insist that Susan pay them for their work anyway despite having failed to kill Paul as planned. All through the film are fantasy sequences from various characters of their fears over being caught or shot by their own accomplices as details of the plan to kill Paul begin to fall apart.

Despite circumstances, Bob does manage to sneak into Paul's hospital room and kills him by smothering him with a pillow before making a quick getaway. However, the next day, as Susan and Sam plan to go to the police station to give their statement and pay off Bill and Steve for their work, Detective Scott and several policemen arrive and arrest all of them as security cameras at the hospital captured all of the events leading up to Paul's murder. When Bob arrives at Susan's house and the police move to arrest him, he attempts to run and opens fire at the policemen but is shot and killed while trying to escape. Steve is shot and killed by a stray bullet in the crossfire. Susan is taken away to jail, while Sam's ex-wife Penny is also arrested due to her knowledge of the plot. Only Betty manages to escape.

In the final scene, with Susan, Sam, Bill and Penny all in prison serving their time, and the bodies of Bob, Steve and Paul at the local morgue, Betty is shown to be living in Las Vegas in the free and clear while working as a casino cocktail waitress. When Dr. Stillman happens to visit the casino with his girlfriend Janice while on vacation, he spots and recognizes Betty working there under her new alias and knows that she had a hand in Paul's murder. Betty pretends not to know who Dr. Stillman is and he lets her go while he continues his vacation with Janice.

== Cast ==
- Nastassja Kinski as Susan Holland
- Billy Zane as Sam Meyers
- Michael Biehn as Bill
- Rob Schneider as Steve
- Lara Flynn Boyle as Betty Johnson
- Dan Aykroyd as Bob
- Lisa Edelstein as Penny Meyers
- Thomas Haden Church as Dr. Chris Stillman
- Bill Duke as Detective Scott
- Adrian Paul as Paul Holland
- Sheree North as Mrs. Beyers
- Jeff Morris as Larry Cooper
- Lauren Tom as Carol
- Steven Banks as Roy
- Christina Venuti as Janice
- Carl Ballantine as Harold Beyers
- Joey Travolta as Bartender
- Dick Kyker as Officer Francis
- Jake Steinfeld as Himself
- Jeremy Suarez as Kevin
- Randal Kleiser as Doctor #1
- Stuart Gordon as Doctor #2
- Adam Rifkin as Gambler #1
- Danny Huston as Gambler #2

== See also ==
- List of American films of 1998
