= A Love Like This (2026 film) =

- Directed by: John Asher
- Written by: Jeffrey Ruggles
- Starring: Emmanuelle Chriqui; Hayes MacArthur
- Music by: Sarah Trevino
- Production companies: Flux Capacitor Studios; Go West Pictures; Hughes Productions
- Distributed by: Quiver Distribution
- Release date: April 3, 2026
- Country: United States
- Language: English

A Love Like This is a 2026 American romantic drama film written by Jeffrey Ruggles and directed by John Asher. It stars Emmanuelle Chriqui and Hayes MacArthur as former high-school sweethearts who maintain a long-running affair despite both being married to other people. The film was distributed by Quiver Distribution and was released in a limited theatrical run, and on digital platforms in the United States, on April 3, 2026.

== Plot ==
Paul and Leah are former high-school sweethearts who have remained emotionally attached for decades. They rent a luxurious house in Malibu, California, for a weekend together, their reunion initially appearing to be an ordinary romantic getaway, with Paul arranging elaborate surprises and the two reminiscing about their youth. It is revealed, however, that both are married to other people, Paul having a wife named Carrie, and Leah having a husband named David, and a young daughter. They have agreed that their Malibu trip will be their final meeting, after which they will end the affair and return to their respective families.

They attempt to treat the weekend as a normal vacation, but repeatedly find themselves interrupted by their lives outside the relationship, making calls to their spouses and children while pretending to be away on business. Their fantasy is further disrupted when Greg, a neighbor, uses the swimming pool at their rental house. Paul and Leah eventually reveal their situation to Greg, including that they are married to other people and that their relationship is an affair. Paul becomes increasingly determined to turn their affair into a permanent relationship. After an evening out, during which he becomes jealous when Leah dances with another man, Paul tells her that he intends to divorce Carrie and move to Chicago, and wants her to leave David and go with him. Leah rejects the idea due to her daughter and family responsibilities, their argument escalates, and she leaves.

Paul regrets his behavior and tries to contact Leah, while Leah reflects on their relationship, and the consequences of repeatedly deceiving David. The lovers eventually reunite and spend the remainder of the weekend together. At dinner with neighbors, they playfully invent an alternate history in which they married after high school and built a life together. Leah ultimately decides to return to her family rather than leave David and her daughter, and Paul accepts that their relationship cannot become the life they imagined. The two spend one final quiet morning together before leaving Malibu separately. Paul receives a package containing a mixtape Leah had assembled from songs associated with their relationship, along with a recorded message expressing her love for him. The final song, Orchestral Manoeuvres in the Dark's "That Was Then", underscores their decision to leave their affair in the past. Whether this is truly the end of the affair is left up in the air.

== Cast ==
- Emmanuelle Chriqui as Leah
- Hayes MacArthur as Paul
- Joel Michaely as Jeremy
- Jason Caceres as Greg
- Ray Abruzzo as Joel
- Joyce Bulifant as Joyce

== Production and release ==
Directed by John Asher from a screenplay by Jeffrey Ruggles, the film was shot in Malibu, California, in 2023 under a SAG-AFTRA interim agreement during the 2023 Hollywood labor disputes. Producers included Jordan Bogdonavage for Go West Pictures, Michael Manasseri for Flux Capacitor Studios, and Sergey Shtern for Hughes Productions. Chriqui and MacArthur were among the film's producers.

Quiver Distribution acquired the North American and United Kingdom distribution rights in March of 2026. The film was scheduled for a limited theatrical release on April 3, 2026, followed by release digitally and as video-on-demand.

== Reception ==
Peter Gray of The AU Review awarded the film 3.5 out of 5 stars, describing it as an intimate examination of a relationship shaped by secrecy and consequence, and praising the film for "how deeply it commits to that tension between desire and consequence". He also lauded the chemistry between the leads as feeling "entirely unforced", and the film's restraint in allowing its characters to remain morally complicated, while pointing out as a weakness in the film that it "occasionally skirts deeper psychological territory in favour of maintaining its tonal consistency". Debbie Lynn Elias of Behind the Lens praised the performances, particularly Chriqui and MacArthur's chemistry, and the Malibu setting, while criticizing the film's relatively predictable dramatic structure.

Stephen Schaefer, writing for the Boston Herald, particularly praised the Malibu setting as "practically a third character in an eye-opening scenario that deftly blends sex, sincerity and surprise".
