= Sarah Palin: You Betcha! =

2011 documentary film about politician

- Film poster
- Directed by: Nick Broomfield; Joan Churchill
- Produced by: Marc Hoeferlin; Cassian Elwes; Marc Hoeferlin
- Starring: Sarah Palin
- Edited by: Michael X. Flores
- Production company: Channel 4 in association with Awakening Films
- Distributed by: Freestyle Releasing
- Release date: September 11, 2011 (TIFF)
- Running time: 90 minutes
- Language: English

Sarah Palin: You Betcha! is a 2011 documentary film about Sarah Palin. Directed by Nick Broomfield and Joan Churchill, the film was produced by Marc Hoeferlin and Cassian Elwes and edited by Michael X. Flores. Shani Hinton, Sophie Watts and Gregory Unruh executive produced. The documentary premiered at the 2011 Toronto International Film Festival. $31,120 was raised through Kickstarter for the film's distribution and advertising. The film received a limited release in the United States on September 30, 2011.

== See also ==
- The Undefeated, another documentary about Sarah Palin exploring the events of her Wasilla mayorship, Alaskan governorship and run for the vice presidential office.
