= The Nutt House (film) =

- VHS cover
- Directed by: Adam Rifkin; Scott Spiegel (uncredited)
- Screenplay by: Bruce Campbell (as R.O.C. Sandstorm); Ivan Raimi (as Alan Smithee Sr.); Sam Raimi (as Alan Smithee Jr.)
- Story by: Ivan Raimi (as Alan Smithee Sr.); Sam Raimi (as Alan Smithee Jr.); Scott Spiegel (as Peter Perkinson)
- Produced by: David Rotman; Brad Wyman
- Starring: Stephen Kearney; Amy Yasbeck; Traci Lords; Barry Livingston; Stella Stevens; Emil Sitka; King Moody; Joseph Whipp; Sandra Gould
- Cinematography: Bernd Heinl
- Edited by: Michael Mulconery; Walt Mulconery
- Music by: Cameron Allan
- Production company: Connexion Film Productions
- Distributed by: Triboro Entertainment Group
- Release date: September 10, 1992 (Germany)
- Running time: 94 minutes
- Country: United States
- Language: English

The Nutt House, initially titled The Nutty Nut, is a 1992 comedy film directed by Adam Rifkin. It stars Stephen Kearney, Traci Lords and Amy Yasbeck. It was also the last film for Emil Sitka, Sandra Gould and King Moody.

== Plot ==
Identical twins Philbert and Nathan Nutt were separated at birth. Philbert is married to a wealthy heiress with a mistress and a political campaign for President of the United States. Nathan has a severe case of multiple personality disorder and has spent his life in a lunatic asylum. Nathan shows up on his brother's doorstep and what begins as a case of mistaken identity spirals out of control.

== Cast ==
- Stephen Kearney as Philbert Nutt / Nathan Nutt
- Traci Lords as Miss Tress
- Amy Yasbeck as Diane Nutt
- Robert Trebor as Buddy
- Robert Colbert as Board Doctor
- Emil Sitka as Geeves
- Sandra Gould as Ma Belle
- Catherine Bach as Benefit Reporter

== Production ==
Filming took place on location in Los Angeles, California in the summer of 1991. Creative tensions between director Scott Spiegel and one of the film's producers, Brad Wyman, resulted in Spiegel being replaced by another director, Adam Rifkin, three weeks into production. Wyman later stated that he regretted firing Spiegel and blamed it on the fact that he (Wyman) "wasn't a very good producer at the time." As a result, the writers of this film—Sam Raimi, Ivan Raimi, Bruce Campbell, and Scott Spiegel—were so embarrassed with the result that they all used pseudonyms instead of their own names in the credits.

== Release ==
The film was released theatrically in Germany on September 10, 1992 and was not released in the United States until the summer of 1995, where it was released directly to videocassette. Two DVD releases followed. The first in 1999, where it was released by Image Entertainment and the second in 2005, where it was released by Ardustry Entertainment. In Australia, it was released on VHS as The Nutty Nut.

== Reception ==
Entertainment Weekly and TV Guide both panned The Nutt House, with the former writing that "the plot of The Nutt House, such as it is, serves merely as an excuse for uninspired slapstick that makes Pauly Shore look like Buster Keaton."
