= Denial (1998 film) =

- Film poster
- Directed by: Adam Rifkin
- Written by: Adam Rifkin
- Produced by: Peter Abrams; Louise Rosner; Brad Wyman
- Starring: Jonathan Silverman; Leah Lail
- Cinematography: Francis Kenny
- Edited by: Peter Schink
- Music by: Tyler Bates
- Production companies: Denial Venture; Tapestry Films; The Kushner-Locke Company
- Distributed by: The Kushner-Locke Company
- Release date: 1998
- Running time: 93 minutes
- Country: United States
- Language: English
- Budget: $5 million (estimated)

Denial is a 1998 American drama film written and directed by Adam Rifkin. It was first screened at the Seattle International Film Festival on May 21, 1998, and was released to video one year later under the title Something About Sex. The plot revolved around couples as they struggle with the hardships of maintaining a monogamous relationship. It starred Jonathan Silverman, Leah Lail, Patrick Dempsey, Christine Taylor, Ryan Alosio, Amy Yasbeck, and Jason Alexander. It was produced by Brad Wyman.

== Plot ==
Couples Joel and Sophie, Sam and Sammie and Isaac and Claudia are dining with writer Art Witz. The latter talks about his new book, in which he argues that monogamy is a lie and that people are by nature alienated. The three couples react furiously. Feeling insulted by Art's views, they end the dinner.

The next day, Isaac buys a wedding present for his wife Claudia in an antique shop. He has sex with the salesgirl. Later, he and Joel attend a hockey game where he seduces another woman, having wild sex back at her apartment. Meanwhile, Claudia searches for Art and ends up in bed with him, admitting that she and Isaac have been polygamous for a long time, but hide it from their friends.

Jewish lawyer Joel receives an erotic massage in an illegal massage studio. He suffers from his guilty conscience. He is plagued by nightmares and decides to tell his wife Sophie the truth. His brother Reuben advises against it. Reuben is a geeky ne'er-do-well, with a penchant for obese women,

Medical student Sophie meets secretly with her medical professor Dr. Lionel Taft, and sleeps with him. She then realizes that she loves her husband. Joel confesses the event to Sophie, while she keeps her affair secret.

Sam, a chef working for a toy catering company, is about to marry his pregnant fiancé Sammie. He is a fan of pornography, which he keeps secret from his fiancée. When she discovers that, she fears that he can cheat her as well. Sammie hires a private investigator, who in turn decides to use a woman as bait for Sam. He, however, resists the woman's charm, which Sammie registers with great relief. The film ends with a scene depicting Sam and Sammie's wedding, which their friends attend as guests.

== Cast ==
- Jonathan Silverman as Joel
- Leah Lail as Sophie
- Patrick Dempsey as Sam
- Christine Taylor as Sammie
- Ryan Alosio as Isaac
- Amy Yasbeck as Claudia
- Jason Alexander as Art Witz
- Charles Shaughnessy as Dr. Lionel Taft
- Adam Rifkin as Reuben
- Hudson Leick as Deborah

== Production ==
The film was filmed on Los Angeles, California.

== Reception ==
Ken Eisner of Variety considered parts of the film to be "adult tube fare", "obvious", and "forced", but praised Adam Rifkin's direction, stating that "[he] adds enough edge and originality to make it a potential click with theater auds. Marketeers will have to win femmes over to pic's slightly male-skewed view." He also praised the film's music score.
