= A Boy Called Hate =

1995 film by Mitch Marcus

- German DVD cover
- Directed by: Mitch Marcus
- Written by: Mitch Marcus
- Produced by: Steve Nicolaides
- Starring: Scott Caan; Missy Crider; Elliott Gould; Adam Beach; James Caan
- Cinematography: Paul Holahan
- Edited by: Michael Ruscio
- Music by: Pray for Rain
- Production companies: Nickel Productions; Pacific Motion Pictures; Skouras Pictures
- Distributed by: Dove Entertainment
- Release dates: February 11, 1995 (Berlinale); May 22, 1996 (United States)
- Running time: 97 minutes
- Country: United States
- Language: English

A Boy Called Hate is a 1995 American crime drama film written and directed by Mitch Marcus in his directorial debut. It stars Scott Caan in the title role, with Missy Crider, Elliott Gould, Adam Beach, and James Caan in supporting roles. It follows a maladjusted teenager who, after a run-in with the law, starts calling himself "Hate".

== Plot ==
Steve is a troubled Los Angeles teenager who renames himself "Hate" following a run-in with the local police. He lives with his divorced father, who is bilking a former employer in a workers' compensation fraud scheme. One evening while taking a motorcycle ride, Hate witnesses what appears to be an attempted rape. He shoots the would-be attacker and takes off with Cindy, the young girl being assaulted. It turns out that the rapist is an assistant district attorney, who survives the shooting and falsely reports that he was the victim of a robbery. Hate and Cindy leave Los Angeles, but their situation deteriorates when Hate fatally shoots a motorcycle officer whom he mistakenly believes has come to arrest him.

== Cast ==
- Scott Caan as Steve "Hate" Bason
- Missy Crider as Cindy Wells
- Elliott Gould as Richard Wells
- Adam Beach as Billy Little Plume
- James Caan as Jim Bason
- Duane Davis as Ed Jenkins
- Scott Patterson as CHP Officer
- Wade Allain-Marcus as Cool Kid
- Buffalo Child as Billy's Friend
- Brian Frejo as Edwin
- Frank Salsedo as Ted
- Lee Nashold as Suburban Cop
- Kevin Michael Richardson as Staff Member
- Cece Tsou as Local News Woman
- Seth Isler as Bartender
- Stephanie Allain as Waitress
- Mary Louise Gemmill as Woman Lawyer
- Brad Lesley as Moving Truck Driver
- Jon Proudstar as War Bonnet Bartender

== Release ==
A Boy Called Hate premiered in the Panorama section of the 45th Berlin International Film Festival on February 11, 1995. The film was released in New York City on May 22, 1996 and in Los Angeles on May 24, 1996, by Dove Entertainment.

== Reception ==
=== Critical response ===
Lawrence Van Gelder of The New York Times wrote: "Stir with an aspiring film maker and what results, all too often, is the movie equivalent of a prepackaged meal in a jiffy: bland and undistinguished. That judgment pretty much sums up A Boy Called Hate." He also commented that "the undernourished script leaves [Scott Caan] not so much seething with hate that gives way to enlightenment as overflowing with youthful stupidity eventually diluted with regret"; and opined that "the film's most vivid character is Billy Little Plume."

David Kronke of the Los Angeles Times called it "one of those excruciatingly shallow and deeply stupid lovers-on-the-lam movies that really sticks it to Mean Ol' Society." He stated: "Scott Caan swaggers through his role like the son of a movie star, not like the wounded and confused soul he's supposed to be; Crider runs the gamut with her one expression—a sneer, naturally. Their dialogue sounds like bad improvisations."

Peter Stack of the San Francisco Chronicle wrote: "Mitch Marcus succeeds in capturing the grim essence of Los Angeles' arid outskirts as a tacky wasteland. Most of this pretentious bad-boy movie, however, tests viewer patience." He also felt: "The movie has an effective tone of grit and danger, thanks to first-time writer-director Marcus' stark approach. But Marcus pushes the alienated kids theme too far, and some plot twists seem preposterous as well as a bit preachy."

Joe Leydon of Variety wrote: "A Boy Called Hate takes a few unexpected turns while covering familiar ground. Pic is iffy as a mainstream theatrical contender but could generate some coin as a video item." He also noted that Scott Caan "is fine in lead role" and "underplays effectively, especially in edgy confrontations between Hate and his dad"; Crider "has a tough row to hoe with a role that calls for so much off-putting crankiness, but she is never less than believable"; and Beach "steals every scene in which he appears as Billy Little Plume."

Kim Newman of Empire gave the film three out of five stars, describing it as "a decent little road movie, mercifully free from wannabe hip Tarantinoisms." He concluded his review by stating: "Despite a sincere performance by Scott Caan, this road flick examines charted area with little innovation."
