= Look: The Series =

- Title card
- Genre: Drama
- Created by: Adam Rifkin
- Written by: Adam Rifkin
- Directed by: Adam Rifkin
- Starring: Colton Haynes; Sharon Hinnendael; Ali Cobrin; Claudia Christian; Marcus Giamatti; Giuseppe Andrews; Miles Dougal
- Country of origin: United States
- Original language: English
- No. of seasons: 1
- No. of episodes: 11

Production
- Executive producer: Adam Rifkin
- Production company: CapturedTV

Original release
- Network: Showtime
- Release: October 10 – December 19, 2010

Look: The Series is an American television drama series that was broadcast on Showtime from October 10 to December 19, 2010. It is written, produced, and directed by Adam Rifkin. Based on the 2007 film of the same title, Look is shot entirely from the point of view of security cameras.

Look follows several interweaving storylines over the course of a week in Los Angeles, some including characters carried over from the original film, others featuring actors from the film returning as different characters. According to the series, there are now approximately 30 million surveillance cameras in the United States generating more than 4 billion hours of footage every week. Both the film and the series raise questions about privacy and security for the audience in a world with a high proliferation of cameras.

== Cast and characters ==
=== Main cast ===
- Colton Haynes as Shane (a high school student)
- Sharon Hinnendael as Hannah (a devious and manipulative high school student who has a crush on Shane)
- Ali Cobrin as Molly (a high school student and Hannah's friend who competes with her for Shane's affection)
- Claudia Christian as Stella (Lenny's drug addicted wife and mother)
- Marcus Giamatti as Lenny (a lawyer and Stella's husband and father)
- Giuseppe Andrews as Willie (a convenience store clerk and aspiring musician; from the feature film)
- Miles Dougal as Carl (Willie's friend; also from the feature film)
- Robert Curtis Brown as Dan the Weatherman (a TV news anchor and Hannah's father)
- Trevor Torseth as Ron (a mute homeless army veteran)
- Richard Speight, Jr. as a Taxi Driver and serial rapist
- Jhoanna Trias as Armani (an erotic dancer at a local nightclub)
- Matt Bushell as Officer Lewis (a police officer)
- Lee Reherman as Officer Munson (a police officer and Officer Lewis' partner)
- Jordan Belfi as Andy (Dan's cynical and scheming co-worker)
- Haley Hudson as Amanda (Willie's girlfriend)
- Ravi Patel as Vinnay
- Brendan Kelly as Tom (an auto mechanic and Stella's adulterous lover)

=== Guest appearances ===
- Gianna Michaels as an erotic dancer
- Sophie Dee as an erotic dancer
- Alexis Knapp as DeDe (an erotic dancer)
- Ron Jeremy (credited as Ron Hyatt) as 'Ugly Fatso'

== Episodes ==
1. Episode One – October 10, 2010
2. Episode Two – October 17, 2010
3. Episode Three – October 24, 2010
4. Episode Four – October 31, 2010
5. Episode Five – November 7, 2010
6. Episode Six – November 14, 2010
7. Episode Seven – November 21, 2010
8. Episode Eight – November 28, 2010
9. Episode Nine – December 5, 2010
10. Episode Ten – December 12, 2010
11. Episode Eleven – December 19, 2010

== Home media ==
The entire series was released on DVD in 2011, but has since become out of print. As of 2025, the series isn't available to stream.
