= Welcome to Hollywood =

- Theatrical release poster
- Directed by: Tony Markes; Adam Rifkin
- Written by: Tony Markes; Adam Rifkin; Shawn Ryan
- Produced by: Tony Markes; Zachary Matz
- Starring: Tony Markes; Adam Rifkin
- Music by: Richard Mercado; Justin Reinhardt
- Distributed by: Home Box Office
- Release dates: October 28, 1998 (AFI); October 27, 2000 (United States)
- Running time: 89 minutes
- Country: United States
- Language: English

Welcome to Hollywood is a 1998 mockumentary film directed by Adam Rifkin.

== Synopsis ==
A young man (Tony Markes) tries to make it in Hollywood as an actor. Various attempts to get noticed for consideration for roles in film and television fail.

== Cast ==
- Tony Markes as Nick Decker
- Adam Rifkin
- Angie Everhart

== Celebrity cameos ==
The film includes cameos from numerous actors, actresses, producers, models, athletes, and other Hollywood figures, including:

- Allison Anders
- Tom Arnold
- Halle Berry
- Sandra Bullock
- Glenn Close
- Wes Craven
- Cameron Crowe
- Cameron Diaz
- Roger Ebert
- Carmen Electra
- Laurence Fishburne
- Peter Fonda
- Jeff Goldblum
- Cuba Gooding Jr.
- Woody Harrelson
- David Hasselhoff
- Salma Hayek
- Evander Holyfield
- Dennis Hopper
- Ron Howard
- Mike Leigh
- Matthew McConaughey
- Ewan McGregor
- Anthony Minghella
- Kelly Monaco
- Julianne Moore
- Cathy Moriarty
- Pat O'Brien
- Nancy O'Dell
- Jada Pinkett Smith
- Kelly Preston
- Fred Roggin
- Steve Schirripa
- Joel Schumacher
- Ron Shelton
- Will Smith
- Mira Sorvino
- John Travolta
- Ally Walker
- John Waters
- Irwin Winkler
- Peter Facinelli
- Robert Wuhl
