= Director's Cut (2016 film) =

- Film poster
- Directed by: Adam Rifkin
- Written by: Penn Jillette
- Produced by: Penn Jillette; Adam Rifkin; Peter Adam Golden
- Starring: Penn Jillette; Missi Pyle; Harry Hamlin; Hayes McArthur; Teller; Lin Shaye; Gilbert Gottfried
- Edited by: Dan Flesher
- Music by: Kevin Blumenfeld
- Distributed by: Epic Pictures
- Release dates: January 22, 2016 (Slamdance); June 5, 2018 (United States)
- Running time: 82 minutes
- Country: United States
- Language: English
- Budget: $5 million

Director's Cut is a 2016 American independent black comedy horror film directed by Adam Rifkin, starring Penn Jillette and Missi Pyle. Principal photography took place in September 2014 and lasted four weeks. It opened the Slamdance Film Festival on January 22, 2016.

On November 9, 2017, it was announced that the film had been picked up for distribution by Epic Pictures through its new label Dread Central Presents.

== Premise ==
Herbert Blount aspires to replace the real director of a movie and make it his own by capturing the lead actress and inflicting much horror upon her in his version.

== Cast ==
- Penn Jillette as Herbert Blount
- Missi Pyle as herself, an actress who portrays Mabel
- Harry Hamlin as himself, an actor who portrays Godfrey Winters
- Hayes MacArthur as himself, an actor who portrays Reed
- Lin Shaye as Captain Wheeler
- Gilbert Gottfried as Superintendent
- Adam Rifkin as himself, the director of the film
- Marshall Bell as a moving company employee
- Nestor Carbonell as Perry, a crime scene investigator
- Teller as Rudy Nelson
- Dave Anthony as Richard Speck
- Bree Olson as a nurse
- Bridey Elliott as a wardrobe assistant
- Dean Cameron as Brian
- Robert Belushi as Ashby

== Marketing ==
For its presentation at the Slamdance Film Festival, the film was described this way: "This ultimate meta-movie is an insane genre-bending cinematic sleight of hand trick about a cineaste stalker who kidnaps his favorite actress and forces her to star in his amateur movie."

== Release ==
Director’s Cut was released by Epic Pictures on Blu-ray through its new label Dread Central Presents on June 5, 2018.
