= Bikini Island (film) =

- Directed by: Tony Markes
- Written by: Emerson Bixby
- Produced by: Anthony Marks; Zachary Matz
- Starring: Holly Floria; Alicia Anne
- Cinematography: Howard Wexler
- Edited by: Ron Resnick
- Music by: Marc David Decker
- Release date: 1991
- Running time: 85 minutes
- Country: United States
- Language: English

Bikini Island is a 1991 American crime thriller film directed by Tony Markes and starring Holly Floria and Alicia Anne. It has been cited as an "erotic thriller".

== Plot ==
James M. Craddock describes the plot as "Beautiful swimsuit models gather on a remote tropical island for a big photo shoot, each vying to be the next cover girl of the hottest swimsuit magazine. Before long, scantily clad lovelies are turning up dead."

== Cast ==
- Holly Floria as Annie
- Alicia Anne as Ursula
- Jackson Robinson as Jack Denton
- Kelly Poole as Brian Michael
- Sherry Johnson as Anesa Cronin
- Gaston LeGaf as Pat
- Shannon Stiles as Nikki
- Kathleen McOsker as Tasha
- Terry Miller as Frab
- B. Lee Drew as Leon DeLodge
- Cyndi Pass as Kari
- Jim E. Jae as Photographer on Cliff
- Dean Georgopoulos as Producer on Cliff
- Laura Lang as Stylist on Cliff
- Rachel Kligerman as Assistant on Cliff

== Production ==
During filming in Malibu, Stuntman Jay C. Currin was killed on the first day of filming when a stunt-fall off a 55-foot cliff went wrong and he landed on some rocks instead of the airbag that had been placed to break his fall.
