= James Caan =

American actor (1940–2022)

- Caan in 1972
- Born: James Edmund Caan; March 26, 1940; New York City, U.S.
- Died: July 6, 2022 (aged 82); Los Angeles, California, U.S.
- Resting place: Eden Memorial Park Cemetery
- Education: Michigan State University; Hofstra University; Neighborhood Playhouse School of the Theatre
- Occupation: Actor
- Years active: 1961–2022
- Political party: Republican
- Spouses: Dee Jay Mathis (m. 1961; div. 1966); Sheila Marie Ryan (m. 1976; div. 1977); Ingrid Hajek (m. 1990; div. 1995); Linda Stokes (m. 1995; div. 2017)
- Children: 5, including Scott

James Edmund Caan (/kɑːn/ KAHN; March 26, 1940 – July 6, 2022) was an American actor. He came to prominence playing Sonny Corleone in The Godfather (1972), for which he was nominated for an Academy Award and Golden Globe for Best Supporting Actor. He received a star on the Hollywood Walk of Fame in 1978.

After early roles in Howard Hawks' El Dorado (1966), Robert Altman's Countdown (1967) and Francis Ford Coppola's The Rain People (1969), Caan gained acclaim for his portrayal of Brian Piccolo in the 1971 television movie Brian's Song, for which he received a Primetime Emmy Award for Outstanding Lead Actor in a Limited Series or Movie nomination. Caan received Golden Globe Award nominations for his performances in the drama The Gambler (1974), and the musical Funny Lady (1975). He continued to receive significant roles in feature films such as Cinderella Liberty (1973), Rollerball (1975), A Bridge Too Far (1977), Comes a Horseman (1978), Chapter Two (1979) and Thief (1981).

After a five-year break from acting, he returned with roles in Gardens of Stone (1987), Alien Nation (1988), Misery (1990), Honeymoon in Vegas (1992), Eraser (1996), Mickey Blue Eyes (1999), The Yards (2000), City of Ghosts (2002), Elf (2003) and Get Smart (2008).

== Early life ==
Caan was born on March 26, 1940 (although some sources stated 1939), in The Bronx, New York City, to Sophie (née Falkenstein; Yiddish: סאָפֿי פֿאַלקענשטיין קאַן; 1915–2016) and Arthur Caan (Yiddish: אַרטור קאַן; 1909–1986), Jewish immigrants from Bingen am Rhein, Rhineland, Germany. In an interview with Charlie Rose, Caan recounted that his father sold a wide variety of meats, as well as kosher meats. James grew up a lively boy and often participated in street fights. At that time, he enjoyed boxing, rodeo and motorcycle riding. One of three siblings, Caan grew up in Sunnyside, Queens. His sister, Barbara Emily Caan Licker, died of leukemia in 1981, aged 38.

Caan was educated in New York City, and later attended Michigan State University (MSU). He was a member of the Alpha Epsilon Pi fraternity during his two years at Michigan State. During his time at MSU he played football as a walk-on quarterback for Coach Duffy Daugherty but only stayed for one year in 1956. He later transferred to Hofstra University in Hempstead, New York, but did not graduate. His classmates at Hofstra included Francis Ford Coppola and Lainie Kazan.

While studying at Hofstra University, Caan became intrigued with acting. He enrolled in New York City's Neighborhood Playhouse School of the Theatre, where he studied for five years. One of his instructors was Sanford Meisner. "I just fell in love with acting," he later recalled. "Of course all my improvs ended in violence."

== Career ==
=== 1960s ===
Caan began appearing off-Broadway in plays such as Arthur Schnitzler's La Ronde before making his 1961 Broadway debut in Blood, Sweat and Stanley Poole. In 1969, he starred in Coppola's The Rain People.

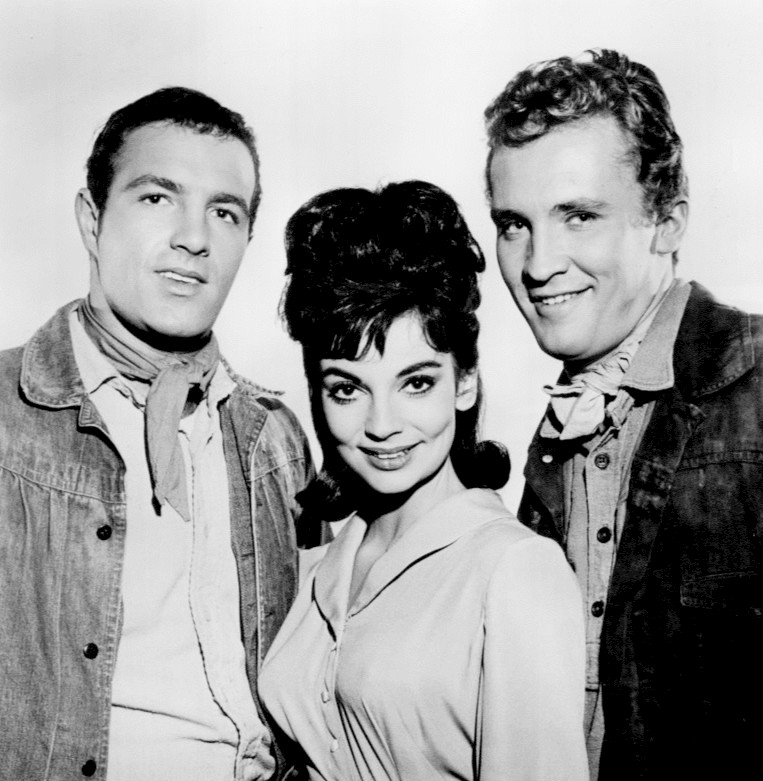
James Caan (left), Karyn Kupcinet, and Roy Thinnes appeared in the "Shadow of Violence" episode of Death Valley Days (1963)

Caan's first television appearance was in an episode of Naked City. He was also seen in episodes of Play of the Week, Route 66, Alcoa Premiere, Dr. Kildare, The Untouchables (in an episode guest starring Lee Marvin), The Doctors and the Nurses, Wagon Train, Death Valley Days (twice), Wide Country, and Combat! as a clever German sergeant. He guest-starred on Ben Casey and Kraft Suspense Theatre.

His first film was Irma la Douce (1963), in which he had an uncredited bit part as a U.S. soldier with a transistor radio more interested in a baseball game than the girl. According to critic Stephen Vagg in Filmink magazine:

People thought Caan was going to be a star pretty much from the get-go. And it's not hard to see why. Watch him in his early movies and TV appearances, and he's simply got "it": he was handsome, virile-looking, and could act (New York trained, Broadway broken). Most of all, he had X factor: a nervous energy and intensity that you can feel off the screen. A lot of stars take a while to warm up – Caan was good from the beginning.

Caan's first substantial film role was as a punk hoodlum who gets his eyes poked out in the 1964 thriller Lady in a Cage, which starred Olivia de Havilland, who praised Caan's performance. He had roles in The Alfred Hitchcock Hour and Wagon Train. He was fourth-billed in a Western feature, The Glory Guys (1965). He turned down the starring role in a TV series around this time, saying, "I want to be an actor not a millionaire."

In 1965, Caan landed his first starring role in Howard Hawks' auto-racing drama Red Line 7000. It was not a financial success. However, Hawks liked Caan and cast him in his next film, El Dorado, playing Alan Bourdillion Traherne, nicknamed Mississippi, in support of John Wayne and Robert Mitchum. He had the starring role in Robert Altman's second feature film, Countdown (1967) and was second billed in the Curtis Harrington thriller Games (1967). Caan went to the United Kingdom to star in a war film, Submarine X-1 (1968), then played the lead in a Western, Journey to Shiloh (1968).

Caan returned to television with a guest role in The F.B.I.. He had an uncredited spot on the spy sitcom Get Smart as a favor to star Don Adams, playing Rupert of Rathskeller in the episode "To Sire with Love".

Caan won praise for his role as a brain-damaged football player in The Rain People (1969), directed by Francis Ford Coppola. He starred with Stefanie Powers in a Western called Gone with the West, filmed in 1969 but not released until 1975.

James Caan starring in Submarine X-1 (1969)

None of these films, apart from El Dorado, was particularly successful at the box office, including Rabbit, Run (1970), based on the John Updike novel of the same name, in which Caan had the lead. He said it "was a film I really wanted to do, really wanted to be involved with." "No one would put me in a movie", he later recalled. "They all said, 'His pictures never make money'."

=== 1970s ===
Caan returned to the small screen with the TV movie Brian's Song (1971), playing dying football player Brian Piccolo, opposite Billy Dee Williams. Caan did not want to return to television and turned down the role several times, but changed his mind after reading the script. The film was a huge critical success and Caan's performance earned him an Emmy nomination. He got a deal to make a film and agreed to be in T.R. Baskin.

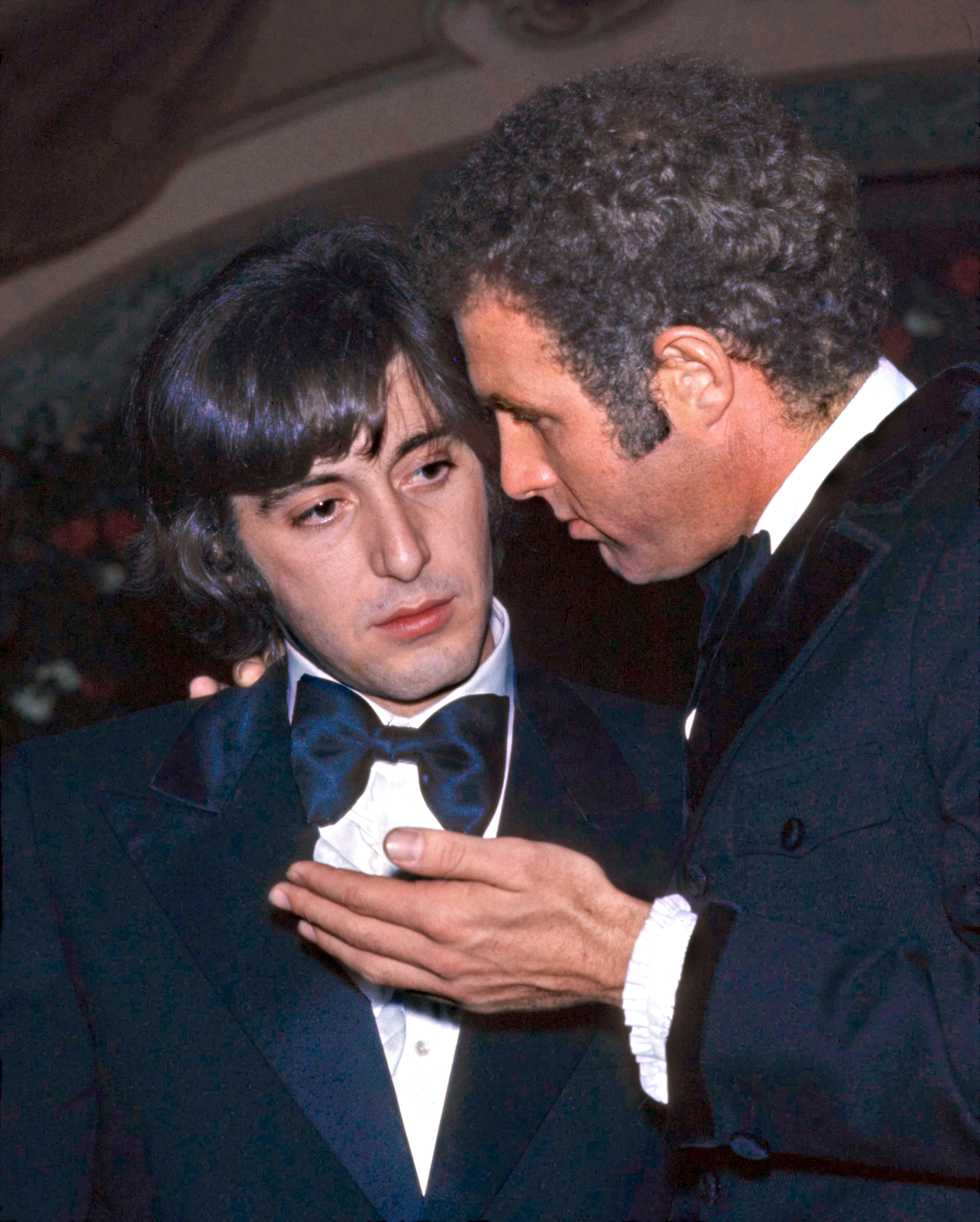
James Caan and Al Pacino in 1972

The following year, Coppola cast him as the short-tempered Sonny Corleone in The Godfather. Originally, Caan was cast as Michael Corleone (Sonny's youngest brother); both Coppola and Caan demanded that this role be played by Al Pacino, so Caan could play Sonny instead. Robert De Niro was also considered to play Sonny. Although another actor, Carmine Caridi, was already signed to play Sonny, the studio eventually insisted on having Caan, so he remained in the production. Caan was nominated for an Academy Award for Best Supporting Actor for his performance in the film, along with co-stars Robert Duvall and Pacino. Caan was closely identified with the role for years afterward: "They called me a wiseguy. I won Italian of the Year twice in New York, and I'm Jewish, not Italian.... I was denied in a country club once. Oh yeah, the guy sat in front of the board, and he says, 'No, no, he's a wiseguy, been downtown. He's a made guy.' I thought, What? Are you out of your mind?"

Caan was now established as a leading movie star. He was in a road movie, Slither (1973), based on a script by W. D. Richter; and a romantic comedy with Marsha Mason, Cinderella Liberty (1973), directed by Mark Rydell. He received good reviews for playing the title role in The Gambler (1974), based on a script by James Toback originally written for Robert De Niro, and directed by Karel Reisz. More popular at the box office was the action comedy Freebie and the Bean (1974) with Alan Arkin.

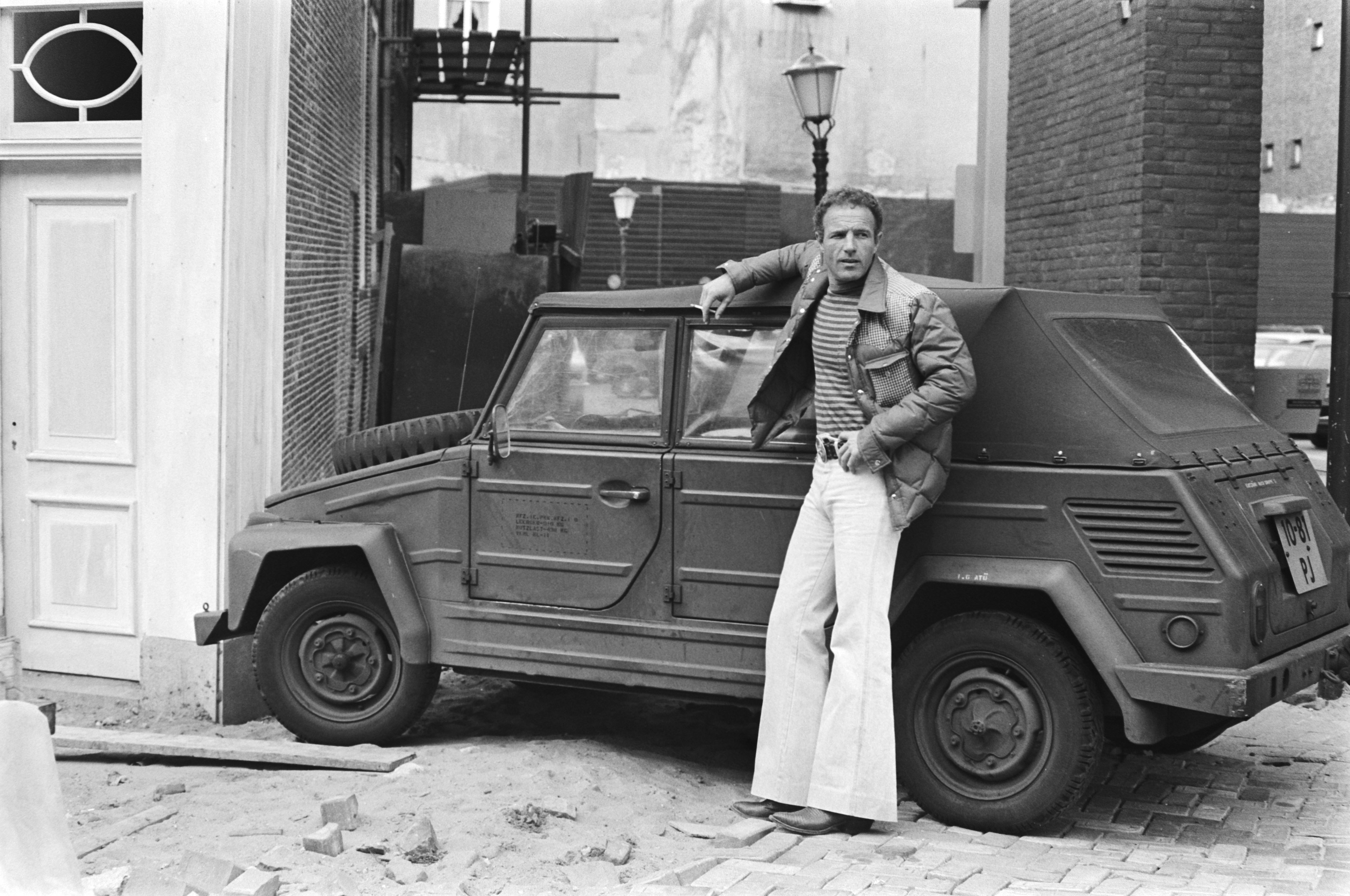
James Caan in 1976 during the filming of A Bridge Too Far

Caan reprised his role as Sonny Corleone for a flashback scene in The Godfather Part II (1974). He had a hit with Funny Lady (1975) playing Billy Rose opposite Barbra Streisand's Fanny Brice. Caan starred in two action films, Norman Jewison's Rollerball (1975) as a star athlete of a deadly extreme sport, and Sam Peckinpah's The Killer Elite (1975). Both were popular, though Caan hated Elite. He made a cameo in Mel Brooks' Silent Movie (1976), and tried comedy with Rydell's Harry and Walter Go to New York (1976). Caan was so unhappy with the latter he sacked his management. He said he did not want to make Elite or Harry but "people kept telling me I had to be commercial."

Caan was one of many stars in the war film A Bridge Too Far (1977). He had a change of pace when he went to France to make Another Man, Another Chance (1977) for director Claude Lelouch alongside Geneviève Bujold, which Caan did for "peanuts" and "loved" the experience.

Back in the United States, Caan made a modern-day Western, Comes a Horseman (1978), with Jane Fonda for director Alan J. Pakula. He was reunited with Marsha Mason in the film adaptation of Neil Simon's autobiographical Chapter Two (1979). Caan later said he only did the film for the money as he was trying to raise money for his directorial debut, but it was a success at the box office.

In 1978, Caan directed Hide in Plain Sight, a film about a father searching for his children, who were lost in the Witness Protection Program. Despite critical praise, the film was only moderately successful with the public.

During Caan's peak years of stardom, he rejected a series of starring roles that proved to be successes for other actors, in films including M*A*S*H, The French Connection, One Flew Over the Cuckoo's Nest, Close Encounters of the Third Kind, Kramer vs. Kramer ("it was such middle class bourgeois baloney"), Apocalypse Now (because Coppola "mentioned something about 16 weeks in the Philippine jungles"), Blade Runner, Love Story, and Superman ("I didn't want to wear the cape".). In 1977, Caan rated several of his movies out of ten – The Godfather (10), Freebie and the Bean (4), Cinderella Liberty (8), The Gambler (8), Funny Lady (9), Rollerball (8), The Killer Elite (5), Harry and Walter Go to New York (0), Slither (4), A Bridge Too Far (7), and Another Man Another Chance (10). He also liked his performances in The Rain People and Thief.

=== 1980s ===
Caan had a role in Claude Lelouch's Les Uns et les Autres (1981), which was popular in France, and won the Technical Grand Prize at the 1984 Cannes Film Festival. In Hollywood, Caan appeared in the neo-noir film Thief (1981), directed by Michael Mann, in which he played a professional safe cracker. Although the film was not successful at the time, Caan's performance was widely lauded and the movie has acquired something of a cult following. Caan always praised Mann's script and direction and often said that, next to The Godfather, Thief was the movie of which he was proudest.

From 1982 to 1987, Caan suffered from depression over his sister's death from leukemia, a growing problem with cocaine, and what he described as "Hollywood burnout" and did not act in any films.

In a 1992 interview, Caan said that this was a time when "a lot of mediocrity was produced. Because I think that directors got to the point where they made themselves too important. They didn't want anything or anybody to distract from their directorial prowess. There were actors who were good and capable, but they would distract from the special effects. It was a period of time when I said, 'I'm not going to work again.'"

He walked off the set of The Holcroft Covenant and was replaced by Michael Caine. Caan devoted much of his time during these years to coaching children's sports. In 1985, he was in a car crash. Caan considered retiring for good but instead of being "set for life", as he believed, he found out one day that "I was flat-ass broke... I didn't want to work. But then when the dogs got hungry and I saw their ribs, I decided that maybe now it's a good idea."

Caan returned to acting in 1987, when Coppola cast him as an army platoon sergeant for the 3rd U.S. Infantry Regiment (The Old Guard) in Gardens of Stone, a movie that dealt with the effect of the Vietnam War on the United States homefront. He only received a quarter of his pre-hiatus salary, and then had to kick in tens of thousands more to the completion bond company because of Holcroft. "I don't know what it is, but, boy, when you're down, they like to stomp on you", he said. The movie was not a popular success but Alien Nation (1988), where Caan played a cop who partnered with an alien, did well. The film received a television spinoff. He had a support role as Spaldoni, under much make up, in Warren Beatty's Dick Tracy.

=== 1990s ===
Caan was planning to make an action film in Italy, but then heard Rob Reiner was looking for a leading man in his adaptation of Stephen King's Misery (1990). Since the script for Misery called for the male lead, Paul Sheldon, to spend most of his time lying in bed tormented by his nurse, the role was turned down by many of Hollywood's leading actors before Caan accepted. Caan had a small role in The Dark Backward (1991) and co-starred with Bette Midler in the expensive For the Boys (1991), directed by Rydell who called Caan "one of the four or five best actors in America".

Caan was a gangster in the comedy Honeymoon in Vegas (1992) and played Coach Winters in The Program (1993). He had supporting roles in Flesh and Bone (1993) and A Boy Called Hate (1995), the latter starring his son Scott Caan. In 1996, he appeared in North Star, a Western; Bottle Rocket, the directorial debut of Wes Anderson; Eraser, with Arnold Schwarzenegger; and Bulletproof with Adam Sandler and Damon Wayans. In 1998, Caan portrayed Philip Marlowe in the HBO film Poodle Springs. He was also in This Is My Father (1998). Caan was a gangster for comedy in Mickey Blue Eyes (1999), with Hugh Grant.

=== 2000s ===
Caan was in The Yards (2000) with Mark Wahlberg and director James Gray, Luckytown (2000) with Kirsten Dunst, and The Way of the Gun (2000) for Christopher McQuarrie. Caan starred in TV movies like Warden of Red Rock (2001) and A Glimpse of Hell (2001), and was in some thrillers: Viva Las Nowhere (2001), In the Shadows (2001), and Night at the Golden Eagle (2002). He was in Lathe of Heaven with Lukas Haas (2002), City of Ghosts (2002) with Matt Dillon, Blood Crime (2002), The Incredible Mrs. Ritchie (2003), and Jericho Mansions (2003). Most of these films were not widely seen, but Dogville (2003) and Elf (2003), in which Caan had key supporting roles, were big successes on the art house and commercial circuit respectively.

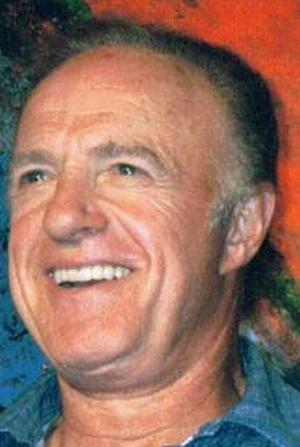
James Caan in 2000

In 2003, Caan portrayed Jimmy the Con in the film This Thing of Ours, whose associate producer was Sonny Franzese, longtime mobster and underboss of the Colombo crime family. The same year, Caan played Will Ferrell's estranged book publisher father in the enormously successful family Christmas comedy Elf, and auditioned for, and won, the role of Montecito Hotel/Casino president "Big Ed" Deline in Las Vegas. On February 27, 2007, Caan announced that he would not return to the show for its fifth season to return to film work; he was replaced by Tom Selleck.

Caan had a role in the TV movie Wisegal (2008), played the President of the United States in the 2008 film Get Smart, and had a part in the movie Cloudy with a Chance of Meatballs (2009). He was one of many stars in New York, I Love You (2008) and had a support role in Middle Men (2009). He did Mercy (2009), which his son Scott wrote and also starred in.

=== 2010s ===
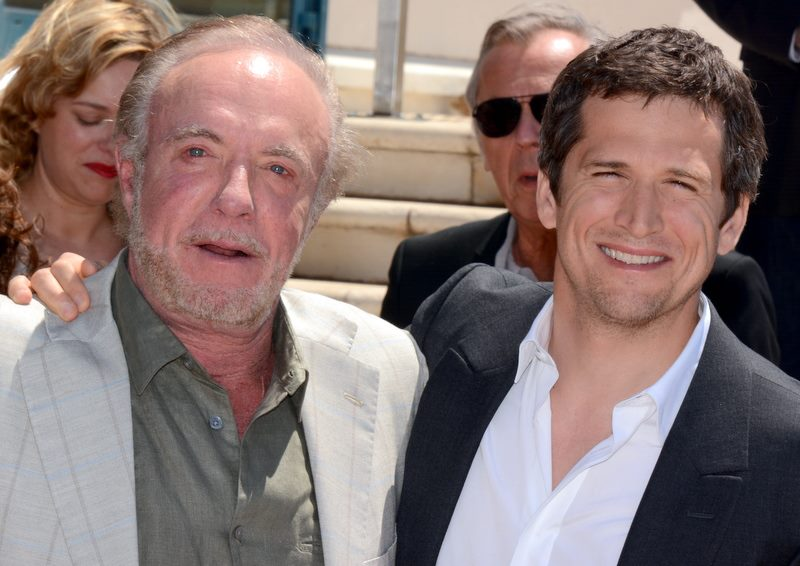
James Caan with Guillaume Canet at the Cannes Film Festival in 2013

Caan appeared in Henry's Crime (2010), Detachment (2011), Small Apartments (2012), That's My Boy (2012) with Adam Sandler, For the Love of Money (2012), and Blood Ties (2013). In 2012, Caan was a guest star on the re-imagined Hawaii Five-0 TV series, playing opposite his son, Scott Caan who played Danny "Danno" Williams. As of 2010 Caan was the chairman of an Internet company, Openfilm, intended to help up-and-coming filmmakers. In 2013, Caan portrayed Chicago mob kingpin Sy Berman in the Starz TV drama Magic City. He tried another regular series, the sitcom Back in the Game (2013) with Maggie Lawson.

Caan returned to film work with A Fighting Man (2013) and The Outsider (2014). In 2014, Caan appeared in the dramatic comedy Preggoland, playing a father who is disappointed with his daughter's lack of ambition, but who becomes overjoyed when she (falsely) announces that she is pregnant. The film premiered in the Special Presentations section at the 2014 Toronto International Film Festival The film had its U.S. premiere on January 28, 2015, at the Santa Barbara International Film Festival. Crackle premiered The Throwaways on January 30, 2015. Caan plays Lt. Col. Christopher Holden, who leads a team fighting a cyberterrorist.

Caan's later films include The Wrong Boyfriend (2015), Sicilian Vampire (2015), JL Ranch (2016), and Good Enough (2016). He had the lead in The Good Neighbor (2016), The Red Maple Leaf (2016), and Undercover Grandpa (2017). In 2019, he starred in Carol Morley's crime drama Out of Blue. In 2021, he appeared in Queen Bees with Ellen Burstyn and Ann-Margret. In 2023, he appeared with Pierce Brosnan in the film Fast Charlie, his final film role.

== Personal life ==
Caan married four times. In 1961, he married Dee Jay Mathis; they divorced in 1966. They had a daughter, Tara (born 1964). Caan's second marriage to Sheila Marie Ryan (a former girlfriend of Elvis Presley) in 1976 was short-lived; they divorced the following year. Their son, Scott Caan, also an actor, was born August 23, 1976.

Caan was married to Ingrid Hajek from September 1990 to March 1994; they had a son, Alexander James Caan, born 1991. In a 1994 interview with Vanity Fair, Hollywood madam Heidi Fleiss claimed to be in a relationship with Caan during his marriage to Hajek in 1992, visiting him on the set of Flesh and Bone in Texas. Caan said his relationship with Fleiss was platonic.

Caan married Linda Stokes on October 7, 1995, they had two sons, James Arthur Caan (born 1995) and Jacob Nicholas Caan (born 1998). Caan filed for divorce in 2017, citing irreconcilable differences.

In 1994, Caan was arrested and released after being accused by a Los Angeles rap artist of pulling a gun on him.

Caan was a practicing martial artist. He trained with Takayuki Kubota for nearly 30 years, earning various ranks. He was a Master (6th Dan) of Gosoku-ryu Karate and was granted the title of Soke Dai by the International Karate Association.

He also took part in steer wrestling at rodeos and referred to himself as the "only Jewish cowboy from New York on the professional rodeo cowboy circuit."

=== Alleged links to organized crime ===
During production of The Godfather in 1971, Caan was known to socialize with Carmine Persico, also known as "The Snake", a notorious mafioso and later head of the Colombo crime family. Government agents briefly mistook Caan, who was relatively unknown at the time, as an aspiring mobster. Caan was also a friend of Colombo Family mobster Andrew Russo who was the godfather of Caan's son Scott Caan.

In 1982, according to a conversation intercepted by the FBI between Caan and mobster Anthony Fiato, Caan requested that Fiato assault actor Joe Pesci over Pesci failing to pay an $8,000 bill to a hotel.

=== Political views ===
Caan supported Donald Trump during the 2016 and 2020 United States presidential elections.

== Death ==
On July 6, 2022, Caan died at Ronald Reagan UCLA Medical Center in Los Angeles, at the age of 82, from a heart attack caused by coronary artery disease. At the time of his death, he also had chronic obstructive pulmonary disease and congestive heart failure. He was buried at Eden Memorial Park Cemetery.

Tributes to Caan were paid by Rob Reiner, Francis Ford Coppola, Barbra Streisand, Al Pacino, Robert De Niro, Talia Shire, Robert Duvall, Kathy Bates, Will Ferrell, and Marsha Mason, among others.

In 2021, Caan was announced to be a member of the cast of Coppola's longtime passion project Megalopolis. Caan petitioned Coppola for a cameo appearance as he saw this film as his potential swan song, leading Coppola to create Nush "The Fixer" Berman for Caan. After Caan's death, Dustin Hoffman was cast in the film.

== Filmography ==
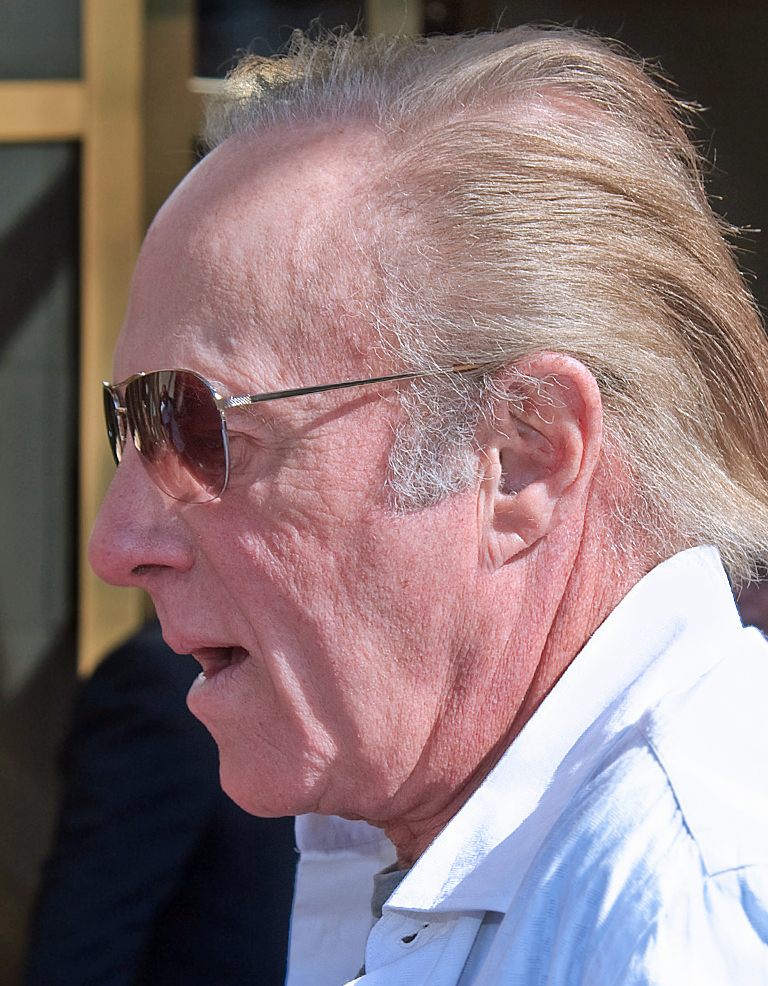
James Caan at the 2010 Toronto International Film Festival

=== Film ===
Year	Title	Role	Notes	Ref.
1963	Irma la Douce	Soldier with Radio	Uncredited	
1964	Lady in a Cage	Randall Simpson O'Connell		
1965	The Glory Guys	Pvt. Anthony Dugan		
1965	Red Line 7000	Mike Marsh		
1966	El Dorado	Alan Bourdillion "Mississippi" Traherne	Director: Howard Hawks	
1967	Games	Paul Montgomery		
1968	Countdown	Lee Stegler		
1968	Submarine X-1	Cmdr. Richard Bolton		
1968	Journey to Shiloh	Buck Burnett		
1969	The Rain People	Jimmy Kilgannon		
1970	Rabbit, Run	Rabbit Angstrom		
1971	T.R. Baskin	Larry Moore		
1972	The Godfather	Santino "Sonny" Corleone		
1973	Slither	Dick Kanipsia		
1973	Cinderella Liberty	John Baggs Jr.		
1974	The Gambler	Axel Freed		
1974	Freebie and the Bean	Freebie		
1974	The Godfather Part II	Santino "Sonny" Corleone	Cameo	
1975	Gone with the West	Jud McGraw	Filmed in 1969; also known as "Man Without Mercy"	
1975	Funny Lady	Billy Rose		
1975	Rollerball	Jonathan E.		
1976	The Killer Elite	Mike Locken		
1976	Silent Movie	Himself		
1976	Harry and Walter Go to New York	Harry Dighby		
1977	A Bridge Too Far	Sgt. Eddie Dohun		
1977	Another Man, Another Chance	David Williams		
1978	Comes a Horseman	Frank "Buck" Athearn		
1979	1941	Sailor in Fight	Uncredited	
1979	Chapter Two	George Schneider		
1980	Hide in Plain Sight	Thomas Hacklin	Also director	
1981	Thief	Frank		
1982	Kiss Me Goodbye	Jolly Villano		
1984	Les Uns et les Autres	Jack Glenn / Jason Glenn		
1987	Gardens of Stone	SFC Clell Hazard		
1988	Alien Nation	Det. Sgt. Matthew Sykes		
1990	Dick Tracy	Spud Spaldoni		
1990	Misery	Paul Sheldon		
1991	The Dark Backward	Doctor Scurvy		
1991	For the Boys	Eddie Sparks		
1992	Honeymoon in Vegas	Tommy Korman		
1993	The Program	Coach Sam Winters		
1993	Flesh and Bone	Roy Sweeney		
1995	A Boy Called Hate	Jim		
1996	North Star	Sean McLennon		
1996	Bottle Rocket	Mr. Abe Henry		
1996	Eraser	U.S. Marshal Robert Deguerin		
1996	Bulletproof	Frank Colton		
1997	Howard Hawks: American Artist	Himself		
1999	This Is My Father	Kieran Johnson		
1999	Mickey Blue Eyes	Frank Vitale		
2000	The Yards	Frank Olchin		
2000	Luckytown	Charlie Doyles		
2000	The Way of the Gun	Joe Sarno		
2001	Viva Las Nowhere	Roy Baker		
2001	In the Shadows	Lance Huston		
2001	Night at the Golden Eagle	Prison Warden	Uncredited	
2002	City of Ghosts	Marvin		
2003	Dogville	The Big Man		
2003	This Thing of Ours	Jimmy "The Con"		
2003	Jericho Mansions	Leonard Grey		
2003	Elf	Walter Hobbs		
2005	Santa's Slay	Darren Mason	Uncredited	
2008	Wisegal	Salvatore Palmeri		
2008	Get Smart	The President		
2008	New York, I Love You	Mr. Riccoli	Segment: "Brett Ratner"	
2009	Middle Men	Jerry Haggerty		
2009	Mercy	Gerry Ryan		
2009	Cloudy with a Chance of Meatballs	Tim Lockwood	Voice	
2010	Henry's Crime	Max Saltzman		
2010	Minkow	Paul Vinsant		
2011	Detachment	Mr. Charles Seaboldt		
2012	Small Apartments	Mr. Allspice		
2012	That's My Boy	Father McNally		
2012	For the Love of Money	Mickey		
2013	Blood Ties	Leon Pierzynski		
2013	Cloudy with a Chance of Meatballs 2	Tim Lockwood	Voice	
2013	The Tale of the Princess Kaguya	The Bamboo Cutter	Voice; English dub	
2014	The Outsider	Karl Schuster		
2014	A Fighting Man	Brother Albright		
2014	Preggoland	Walter Huxley		
2015	The Throwaways	Lt. Col. Christopher Holden		
2015	Sicilian Vampire	Professor Bernard Isaacs		
2016	The Good Neighbor	Harold Grainey		
2016	The Red Maple Leaf	George Lawrence Secord		
2017	Undercover Grandpa	Grandpa - Major Lou Crawford		
2017	Holy Lands	Harry Rosenmerck		
2018	Out of Blue	Col. Tom Rockwell		
2018	Con Man	Agent Gamble		
2021	Queen Bees	Dan Simpson		
2023	Fast Charlie	Stan Mullen	Posthumous release	

=== Television ===
Year	Title	Role	Notes
1961	Route 66	Johnny - street gang leader	Episode: "And the Cat Jumped Over the Moon"
1961	The Untouchables	Keir Brannon	Episode: "A Fast of Five"
1963	Death Valley Days	Jim McKinney / Bob	2 episodes
1963	Kraft Suspense Theatre	Rick Peterson	Episode: "The Hunt"
1964	Combat!	German sergeant	Episode: "Anatomy of a Patrol"
1964	Alfred Hitchcock Presents	Jay Shaw / Phil Beldone	Episode: "Memos from Purgatory"
1965	Wagon Train	Paul	Episode: "The Echo Pass Story"
1969	The F.B.I.	Eugene	Episode "A Life in the Balance"
1969	Get Smart	Rupert of Rathskeller (uncredited)	2 episodes "To Sire, with Love: Parts 1 and 2"
1971	Brian's Song	Brian Piccolo	Television film
1996	NewsRadio	James Caan / Himself	Episode: "Movie Star"
1998	Poodle Springs	Philip Marlowe	Television film
2001	Warden of Red Rock	John Flinders	Television film
2001	A Glimpse of Hell	Capt. Fred Moosally	Television film
2002	Lathe of Heaven	Dr. William Haber	Television film
2002	Blood Crime	Sheriff Morgan McKenna	Television film
2003	The Incredible Mrs. Ritchie	Harry Dewitt	Television film
2003–2007	Las Vegas	Ed Deline	Main role, 88 episodes
2004	Crossing Jordan	Ed Deline	Episode: "What Happens in Vegas Dies in Boston""
2004	The Simpsons	Himself (voice)	Episode: "All's Fair in Oven War"
2010	Family Guy	Himself (voice)	Episode: "Something, Something, Something, Dark Side"
2010	Annoying Orange	Jalapeño (voice)	Web series
2012	Hawaii Five-0	Tony Archer	Episode: "Lekio"
2013	Magic City	Sy Berman	5 episodes
2013	Back in the Game	Terry "The Cannon" Gannon	13 episodes
2015	Wuthering High School	Mr. Earnshaw	Television film
2016	The American West	Himself	Episode 8: "The Last Vendetta"
2016	J.L. Family Ranch	Tap Peterson	Television film
2020	J.L. Family Ranch: The Wedding Gift	Tap Peterson	Television film

=== Video games ===
Year	Title	Role
2006	The Godfather	Sonny Corleone (voice)

== Accolades ==
Year	Award	Category	Project	Result
1965	Golden Globe Award	New Star of the Year – Actor	The Glory Guys	Nominated
1972	Primetime Emmy Award	Outstanding Lead Actor in a Miniseries or Movie	Brian's Song	Nominated
1972	Academy Award	Best Supporting Actor	The Godfather	Nominated
1972	Golden Globe Award	Best Supporting Actor - Motion Picture	The Godfather	Nominated
1974	Golden Globe Award	Best Actor in a Motion Picture - Drama	The Gambler	Nominated
1975	Golden Globe Award	Best Actor in a Motion Picture - Musical or Comedy	Funny Lady	Nominated
1975	Saturn Award	Best Actor	Rollerball	Won
1990	Saturn Award	Best Actor	Misery	Nominated
