= Look (2007 film) =

- Theatrical release poster
- Directed by: Adam Rifkin
- Written by: Adam Rifkin
- Produced by: Barry Schuler; Brad Wyman
- Starring: Rachel Vacca; Sebastian Feldman; Rhys Coiro; Jennifer Fontaine; Heather Hogan; Bailee Madison
- Cinematography: Scott Billups; Ron Forsythe
- Edited by: Martin Apelbaum
- Music by: BT
- Distributed by: Captured Films
- Release date: December 14, 2007
- Running time: 98 minutes
- Country: United States
- Language: English

Look is a 2007 American found footage film directed by Adam Rifkin. The film is composed entirely of material shot from the perspective of surveillance cameras. Though shot using CineAlta movie cameras, all were placed in locations where actual surveillance cameras were mounted. The scenes are staged and scripted. The film's score was provided by electronic music producer BT.

== Plot ==
The film follows several intertwining narratives as the security cameras watch over the characters in several different areas over the course of one week.

Tony, a manager at a housewares store, sexually harasses, and occasionally has sex with, his female employees.

Office worker Marty is a socially awkward geek who seems to be born of bad luck. Over the course of the film, Marty becomes upset by the wide range of pranks pulled on him at work and explodes his frustration onto the person who pranks him, but the co-worker remains unfazed.

Ben and his wife Louise install cameras into their house to look after their baby while they are at work. Their eight-year-old daughter Megan ends up being the target of a pedophile over the course of two days, when she and Louise shop for clothes, housewares and toys at the mall. The pedophile is revealed to be Marty.

Two sociopaths are pulled over by a cop on the highway. They overpower the officer, shoot him, and drive his vehicle into the ditch. They rob a woman at gunpoint, lock her in the trunk, and leave it in the mall parking lot. A convenience store clerk recognizes the pair as the "Candid Camera Killers". The pair make a swift getaway as the clerks watch on a news camera, before colliding head-on with another vehicle. One of the robbers is killed and the other one is injured. The clerks are awarded $50,000 at a public ceremony, while the surviving killer is found guilty of murder.

A high school student named Sherri admits to her friend Holly that she has a secret crush on Berry Krebbs, one of her teachers. Sherri attempts to flirt with Berry several times, but he refuses, citing his wife and the child that they are expecting. He finally relents when she corners him at his car late one night on school grounds. The next day, police arrest Berry on sexual assault and rape charges. Sherri claims that Berry forced her into the vehicle and had unprotected sex with her, but the police mention that her school is equipped with surveillance cameras and that they have a copy of the tape. Sherri drops the rape charges and is expelled. Berry's wife Joan leaves him and moves back to Philadelphia. Berry is charged with statutory rape and forced to register as a sex offender. His lawyer, Ben, advises him to plead no contest at his trial to have his sentence reduced to ten years. Joan gives birth while Berry is incarcerated

A darker-skinned man accidentally leaves his knapsack on a bus. The bus is evacuated and the bomb squad is called in, revealing that the knapsack contains nothing more than college textbooks.

Marty is approached by a police officer at his cubicle. Fearing that he is about to be arrested for the abduction of the little girl, Marty is instead horrified to learn that this is yet another cruel practical joke against him as the officer ends up being a male stripper. The office workers laugh and hurl homophobic insults at the humiliated Marty, unaware of his true nature.

== Critical reception ==
As of March 1, 2023, the review aggregator website Rotten Tomatoes reported that 60% of critics gave the film positive reviews, based on 35 reviews. The website's consensus reads, "Though Adam Rifkin's voyeuristic film sometimes feels like only a clever gimmick, it's for the most part a compelling thriller with political overtones." On Metacritic, the film had an average score of 50 out of 100, based on 9 reviews — indicating mixed or average reviews.

== Television series ==
Showtime confirmed in January 2010 that a television series based on the movie would be released sometime the same year. On September 1, 2010, a teaser trailer was released and the show premiered on October 10, 2010, and the series aired Sunday nights on Showtime through December 19, 2010.

== Postcard controversy ==
During the first week of April 2009, the United States Postal Service announced that they were unwilling to deliver promotional postcards made for Look. The postcard advertisements depict a man with his boxers around his ankles in the midst of sexual intercourse with a woman in a generic mail room setting, as captured on a hidden camera. The nudity in the image is not blatant but the postal service has characterized the content as obscene. The postcard image is headlined by the caption: "It is LEGAL for your company to get permission to install HIDDEN CAMERAS IN THE WORKPLACE!"

== See also ==
- List of films featuring surveillance
