= The Dark Backward =

1991 film by Adam Rifkin

- Theatrical release poster
- Directed by: Adam Rifkin
- Written by: Adam Rifkin
- Produced by: Brad Wyman; Cassian Elwes
- Starring: Judd Nelson; Bill Paxton; Wayne Newton; Lara Flynn Boyle
- Cinematography: Joey Forsyte
- Edited by: Peter Schink
- Music by: Marc David Decker
- Production companies: Backward Films; L.A. Dreams Productions
- Distributed by: Greycat Films
- Release date: July 26, 1991
- Running time: 101 minutes
- Country: United States
- Language: English
- Budget: $700,000
- Box office: $28,654

The Dark Backward (also known as The Man with Three Arms) is a 1991 American black comedy film written and directed by Adam Rifkin. It stars Judd Nelson, Bill Paxton, and Wayne Newton. It follows a garbage man who tries his hand at stand-up comedy, failing miserably until a third arm mysteriously grows from his back.

The film was given a limited theatrical release in the United States on July 26, 1991, by Greycat Films. It received mixed reviews from critics and underperformed at the box office, but has since become a cult film. For his performance, Newton was nominated for the Saturn Award for Best Supporting Actor.

== Plot ==
Marty Malt is an unhappy garbage man who moonlights as an atrociously unfunny standup comic. He lives in a dark, grimy, garbage-strewn urban netherworld, where a company named Blump's apparently owns everything. His best friend and fellow trash collector, Gus, is the only one who laughs at his jokes, and his sincerity is questionable. The obnoxiously exuberant Gus plays an accordion, which he always carries with him. Marty is seeing Rosarita, a waitress, but she doesn't seem too interested in him.

One day, Gus convinces a talent agent, Jackie Chrome, to check out Marty's act. Jackie isn't impressed. Marty's luck seems to take a turn for the worse when a large lump starts growing on his back. He goes to a quack doctor, who calls him a wimp and puts a Band-Aid on the lump. The lump continues to grow, eventually becoming a full-sized arm. While Gus uses Marty's newfound freakishness to impress his morbidly obese girlfriends, a horrified Rosarita breaks up with Marty, and he gets fired from the club where he does his act.

Marty is despondent until Gus brings him to see Jackie, who, it turns out, has always dreamed of finding a real three-armed comic. Re-christened "Desi the Three-Armed Wonder Comic," and with Gus now providing musical accompaniment, Marty gets a fresh start on his career. Marty and Gus have a few semi-successful shows and eventually meet Hollywood talent agent Dirk Delta, who offers them a job. Marty, Gus and Jackie celebrate this big break and everything seems to be looking up until Marty wakes up the following morning and discovers his third arm has inexplicably vanished.

He goes with Gus to see Jackie, who is furious at first but calms down and decides to tell Dirk the truth upon Marty's suggestion. After calling Dirk and telling him the bad news, Dirk surprisingly asks them to send Gus to fill the spot with his accordion playing. Gus is ecstatic and leaves almost immediately. Marty is sad but gets his job back at the club and uses the story of his third arm in his act and finally gets a few laughs from the crowd.

== Cast ==
- Judd Nelson as Marty Malt
- Bill Paxton as Gus
- Wayne Newton as Jackie Chrome
- Lara Flynn Boyle as Rosarita
- James Caan as Dr. Scurvy
- Rob Lowe as Dirk Delta
- King Moody as Twinkee Doodle
- Claudia Christian as Kitty
- Danny Dayton as Syd
- Carrie Lynn as Nicolette
- Anna Berger as Mrs. Malt
- Lydell M. Cheshier as Dexter
- Tom Hodges as Marjorie Zipp
- Theodocia Goodrich as Mrs. Bielfuss
- Laurianne Jameson as Shirley
- Debra Perkins as Pickles
- Charles Knapp as Sloppy
- Clifford Streit as Raoul
- Richard Morrison as Elvis
- Charles Winkler as Dirk Delta's Assistant
- Landon Godfrey as Unfamiliar Waitress
- Gary Vonderlinden as Joey
- Bobs Gannaway as Denny Ginkle
- Marc David Decker as Barber
- Scott Goldman as Mouseman
- Adam Rifkin as Rufus Bing
- Michele Rifkin as Seamstress
- Harold Sokol as Apples Yonahan
- Steve Bing as Basketball Player
- Tony Cox as Human Xylophone

== Production ==
The Dark Backward was the first screenplay that Adam Rifkin ever wrote. He was just 19 years old when he was inspired to write it after watching a night of stand-up comedy in 1985.

Principal photography began on August 14, 1990, in Los Angeles, California, and concluded in mid-September 1990.

== Release ==
=== Theatrical ===
The Dark Backward had its world premiere at the Santa Barbara International Film Festival on March 9, 1991. It was released in New York City on July 26, 1991, and in Los Angeles on November 22, 1991.

=== Home media ===
The film was released on VHS in the United States by RCA/Columbia Pictures Home Video in 1992. Sony Pictures Home Entertainment later released a special edition DVD on October 3, 2007. It was released on Blu-ray on May 19, 2026.

== Reception ==
=== Box office ===
The Dark Backward grossed only $28,654 in North America.

=== Critical response ===
On the review aggregator website Rotten Tomatoes, 42% of 12 critics' reviews are positive. Metacritic, which uses a weighted average, assigned the film a score of 48 out of 100, based on 7 critics, indicating "mixed or average" reviews.

Janet Maslin of The New York Times stated, "The Dark Backward concentrates only on stomach-turning trivia and on the kind of exaggeratedly stupid behavior that amounts to directorial condescension. […] The film's efforts to say something about success and its capriciousness never succeed in rising above an elbow-in-the-ribs obviousness." Maslin opined that Judd Nelson "gives the film's best performance, which is not to say anything pleasant about the others."

Kevin Thomas of the Los Angeles Times wrote, "The Dark Backward is ultimately a tale of liberation with the notion that only when you are truly free can you be truly funny. These may seem awfully sober thoughts for what looks to be a candidate for a midnight cult movie. However, for all its gross-out humor The Dark Backward is a work of real craftsmanship that builds well and boasts superlative production design, incorporating thrift-store kitsch from the past couple of decades, fine moody camera work and a driving, cockamamie carousel music score."

Peter Travers of Rolling Stone commented, "Adam Rifkin wrote the script for this comedy six years ago when he was nineteen. The result would be more excusable if he had written it nineteen years ago when he was six." Travers also stated, "Instead of the high satire of How to Get Ahead in Advertising (in which a boil on Richard E. Grant's neck grows into a talking head), Rifkin has conjured up a new low in cinematic ineptitude."

The film has gained a cult following over the years. In 2018, Rifkin said that "The Dark Backward is and forever will be my sentimental favorite. It is the only thing I ever wrote that isn't influenced by outside voices. Every script you write, to some degree, is influenced by the business at large. […] I wrote it purely from my heart. It was something I wanted to write because it was something I wanted to see. Because that will never ever happen again, that's why it holds such a place in my heart."

=== Accolades ===
Year	Award	Category	Nominee	Result
1992	18th Saturn Awards	Best Supporting Actor	Wayne Newton	Nominated
