= Cabin Fever (franchise) =

American comedy horror film series

- Official franchise logo
- Created by: Eli Roth
- Original work: Cabin Fever (2002)
- Owners: Lions Gate Entertainment (2002–2009); Image Entertainment (2014); IFC Midnight Films (2016)
- Years: 2002–2016

Films and television
- Film(s): Cabin Fever (2002); Cabin Fever 2: Spring Fever (2009); Cabin Fever: Patient Zero (2014); Cabin Fever (2016)

Cabin Fever is an American comedy horror film series created by Eli Roth. It includes the original theatrical films, two straight-to-video follow-ups that both had limited theatrical releases, and a theatrical remake. The plot centers around groups of people who contract an extremely deadly flesh-eating disease, and their attempts to survive its symptoms.

The original film received mixed reviews but was a box-office success. The sequel was more poorly received but remained profitable. The prequel drew negative reviews but earned income through home media sales. The 2016 remake had the weakest critical response and performed poorly financially.

== Films ==
Film	U.S. release date	Director	Screenwriter(s)	Story by	Producers
Cabin Fever	September 12, 2003	Eli Roth	Eli Roth & Randy Pearlstein	Eli Roth	Eli Roth, Sam Froelich, Lauren Moews & Evan Astrowsky
Cabin Fever 2: Spring Fever	February 16, 2010	Ti West	Joshua Malkin	Ti West & Randy Pearlstein	Lauren Moews, Patrick Durham & Jonathan Sachar
Cabin Fever: Patient Zero	August 1, 2014	Kaare Andrews	Jake Wade Wall	Jake Wade Wall	Jaime Pina & Evan Astrowsky
Cabin Fever	February 12, 2016	Travis Z	Eli Roth & Randy Pearlstein	Eli Roth	Tim Zajaros, Evan Astrowsky & Christopher Lemole

=== Cabin Fever (2002) ===
A group of college friends consisting of Paul, Karen, Bert, Marcy, and Jeff plan a week-long vacation getaway together, at an isolated cabin. Upon their arrival, a man infected with an undisclosed flesh-eating disease approaches them for help, though in a panicked frenzy they incinerate the man. When he falls into the local reservoir and dies, the water supply quickly becomes contaminated. Unbeknownst to the friends, their weekend partying is about to become a living nightmare as they one by one contract the sickness, and fight to escape shack in the woods as survivors.

=== Cabin Fever 2: Spring Fever (2009) ===
Following the events of the previous installment, the predatory flesh-eating disease begins to spread. As a group of friends: John, Cassie, Alex, and Liz start their evening in excitement for their high school prom night; contaminated water begins to spread the affliction throughout the night. Through a series of events, one by one the event's attendees succumb to the sickness. Together the friends fight to stay alive through the night, while they watch their peers horrifically die before them.

=== Cabin Fever: Patient Zero (2014) ===
When a group of friends named Marcus, Kate, Josh, Penny, and Dobbs believe that they're going to experience a bachelor party to remember, they travel to a privately owned island in the Caribbean. As they celebrate the occasion together, they discover the locale is not as remote as they had been told when they stumble upon a research facility running tests on an imprisoned man who is infected by an undisclosed disease. When the extremely contagious deadly flesh-eating virus is released from its containment, the friends quickly scramble to escape the island, all while fighting to last the rapid outbreak.

=== Cabin Fever (2016) ===
In October 2014, it was announced that a remake of the 2002 film was being developed, using the same script as the original. Directed by Travis Z, the new adaptation was poorly received by audiences and critics alike. While the production made minor changes, it was declared inferior to its source material with critiques directed at its near shot-for-shot depiction of the first movie, while replacing the comedy elements with a grounded dark interpretation instead.

Despite its rejection from the audience, franchise creator Eli Roth appreciated the movie, praising the filmmaker; stating: "I saw it and I was blown away. I couldn't believe it. Travis Zariwny the director did a fantastic job."

=== Future ===
In December 2023, Eli Roth stated that he intends to develop another Cabin Fever movie; stating that he felt like he had "ignored them for too long." Acknowledging that he has ideas for where to take the story next, the filmmaker confirmed he also wants to once again serve in his role of director.

== Principal cast and characters ==
List indicator

This section includes characters who will appear or have appeared in the franchise in main roles.

- An empty grey cell indicates the character was not in the film, or that the character's official presence has not yet been confirmed.

Character	Original series		Prequel	Remake
Character	Cabin Fever	Cabin Fever 2: Spring Fever	Cabin Fever: Patient Zero	Cabin Fever
Character	2002	2009	2014	2016
Principal cast
Paul	Rider Strong	Rider Strong^{C}		Samuel Davis
Karen	Jordan Ladd			Gage Golightly
Jeff	Joey Kern			Matthew Daddario
Marcy	Cerina Vincent			Nadine Crocker
Bert	James DeBello			Dustin Ingram
John		Noah Segan		
Cassie		Alexi Wasser		
Alex		Rusty Kelley		
Liz Grillington		Regan Deal		
Marcus			Mitch Ryan	
Kate Arias			Claudette Lali	
Josh			Brando Eaton	
Penny			Jillian Murray	
Dobbs			Brando Eaton	
Dr. Edwards			Currie Graham	
Mr. Porter			Sean Astin	
Supporting cast
Grim	Eli Roth (as Justin)			Timothy G. Zajaros (as Connor)
Dep. Winston Olsen	Giuseppe Andrews	Giuseppe Andrews		
Dep. Winston				Louise Linton
Henry Caldwell, the Hermit	Arie Verveen			Randy Schulman
"Old Man" Caldwell	Robert Harris			George Griffith
Tommy Caldwell	Hal Courtney			Aaron Trainor
Dennis	Matthew Helms			Derrick R. Means
Bunny Man	Appeared	Ozzy Alvarez		
Bill	William G. Stone	Larry Fessenden		
Prin. Sinclair		Michael Bowen		
Rick		Thomas Blake, Jr.		
Frederica		Amanda Jelks		
Marc		Marc Senter		
Herman Olsen		Mark Borchardt		
Camila			Solly Duran	
Bridgett			Lydia Hearst	

== Additional crew and production details ==
Film	Crew/Detail					
Film	Composer	Cinematographer	Editor(s)	Production companies	Distributing companies	Running time
Cabin Fever (2002)	Nathan Barr	Scott Kevan	Ryan Folsey	Lions Gate Films, Black Sky Entertainment, Deer Path Films, Down Home Entertainment, Tonic Films	Lions Gate Entertainment	1 hr 34 mins
Cabin Fever 2: Spring Fever	Ryan Shore	Eliot Rockett	Janice Hampton	Lionsgate Films, Tonic Films, Morningstar Films, Aloe Entertainment, Proud Mary Entertainment	Lionsgate	1 hr 26 mins
Cabin Fever: Patient Zero	Kevin Riepl	Norm Li	Michael P. Mason	RLJE Films, Voltage Pictures, Indomina Group, Hypotenuse Pictures	Image Entertainment	1 hr 35 mins
Cabin Fever (2016)	Kevin Riepl	Gavin Kelly	Kyle Tekiela	Armory Films, Contend Entertainment, Pelican Point Media	IFC Midnight	1 hr 38 mins

== Reception ==
=== Box office and financial performance ===
Film	Box office gross			Box office ranking		Video sales gross	Worldwide total gross income	Budget	Worldwide total net income	Ref.
Film	North America	Other territories	Worldwide	All time North America	All time worldwide	Video sales gross	Worldwide total gross income	Budget	Worldwide total net income	Ref.
Cabin Fever (2002)	$21,158,188	$9,395,206	$30,553,394	#3,623	#4,816	Figures not publicly available	>$30,553,394	$1,500,000	≥$29,053,394	
Cabin Fever 2: Spring Fever	—N/a	Figures not publicly available	>$0	—N/a	—N/a	$709,507	≥$709,507	Information not publicly available	≤$709,507	
Cabin Fever: Patient Zero	—N/a	Figures not publicly available	>$0	—N/a	—N/a	$326,291	≥$326,291	Information not publicly available	≤$326,291	
Cabin Fever (2016)	—N/a	$114,835	$114,835	#17,852	#24,776	$125,697	$240,532	Information not publicly available	≤$240,532	
Totals	$21,158,188	>$9,510,041	>$30,668,229	x̄ #7,390	x̄ #7,400	>$1,161,495	>$31,829,724	>$1,500,000	≥$30,329,724	

=== Critical response ===
Film	Rotten Tomatoes	Metacritic
Cabin Fever (2002)	62% (141 reviews)	56/100 (31 reviews)
Cabin Fever 2: Spring Fever	(2 reviews)	—N/a
Cabin Fever: Patient Zero	20% (20 reviews)	30/100 (12 reviews)
Cabin Fever (2016)	0% (29 reviews)	14/100 (7 reviews)

== Cancelled projects ==
In 2011, the announcement of Cabin Fever: Patient Zero and a fourth film was revealed to be in development at Indomina and Hypotenuse Pictures, with both films expected to shoot back-to-back. Texas Chainsaw 3D screenwriters Adam Marcus and Debra Marcus were tapped to pen the script, entitled Cabin Fever: Outbreak, with a planned production start of Spring 2012 in the Dominican Republic. The initial plot served as direct sequel to Patient Zero and followed a doctor on a Caribbean island attempting to contain the virus. However, story changes were made with the final iteration taking place on a cruise ship. Production for Patient Zero was delayed to August and then to October 2012, with no mention of any further updates on Outbreak. By May 2013, Voltage Pictures and Idomina began developments to create a trilogy of films that followed chronologically after Patient Zero. By April 2014 however, these plans were scrapped altogether in favor of producing a remake of the original film. Indomina exited the new project, while Cassian Elwes and Evan Astrowsky boarded the remake as producers.
