= Cabin Fever =

Cabin fever is restlessness from being in a confined area.

Cabin Fever may also refer to:

== Books ==
- Cabin Fever, a 1918 novel by B. M. Bower
- Cabin Fever (novel), a 1990 novel by Elizabeth Jolley
- Cabin Fever (visual novel), a romance visual novel by Sad Panda Studios
- Diary of a Wimpy Kid: Cabin Fever, a graphic novel by Jeff Kinney

== Film and TV ==
- Cabin Fever (2000 film), a Norwegian film by Mona J. Hoel
- Cabin Fever (2002 film), a horror film by Eli Roth
  - Cabin Fever 2: Spring Fever, the sequel to the 2002 horror film
  - Cabin Fever: Patient Zero, the prequel to the 2002 horror film
  - Cabin Fever (2016 film), the remake to the 2002 horror film
- Cabin Fever (2020 film), a 2020 South African film by Tim Greene
- "Cabin Fever" (Lost), a 2008 episode of Lost
- Cabin Fever (TV series), a 2003 Irish reality TV show
- "Cabin Fever / Rinse & Spit", a 1993 episode of Rocko's Modern Life
- "Cabin Fever", a documentary of the making of the Black Crowes' Before the Frost...Until the Freeze
- "Cabin Fever", a 2015 episode of NCIS
- "Cabin Fever", the fiftieth episode of Sonic Boom
- Cabin Fever!, an online spin-off of the BBC Radio 4 sitcom Cabin Pressure
- Diary of a Wimpy Kid Christmas: Cabin Fever, a 2023 animated film adapting the novel by Jeff Kinney
- "Cabin Fever", the fourth episode of the YouTube animated series Murder Drones (2021-2024)

== Music ==
=== Albums ===
- Cabin Fever (Michael Stanley Band album), 1978
- Cabin Fever (Flying Burrito Brothers album), 1985
- Cabin Fever (Lenny Breau album), 1997
- Cabin Fever (Rasputina album), 2002
- Cabin Fever (Scaramanga Six album), 2004
- Cabin Fever (Corb Lund album), 2012
- Cabin Fever (Purple Kiss album), 2023
- Cabin Fever (mixtape), a 2011 mixtape by Wiz Khalifa, or the title track

=== Songs ===
- "Cabin Fever", a song by Nick Cave and the Bad Seeds from From Her to Eternity
- "Cabin Fever", a song by Super Furry Animals from Love Kraft
- "Cabin Fever", a song from Muppet Treasure Island
- "Cabin Fever", a song by Marillion from The Making of Brave
- "Cabin Fever", a song by Roam from Backbone
- "Cabin Fever", a song by Stand Atlantic from F.E.A.R.
- "Cabin Fever", a song by The Wonder Stuff from Construction for the Modern Idiot
- "Cabin Fever", a song by Jaden Smith
