= Cabin =

Cabin may refer to:

== Buildings ==
- Beach cabin, a small wooden hut on a beach
- Log cabin, a house built from logs
- Cottage, a small house
- Chalet, a wooden mountain house with a sloping roof
- Cabin, small free-standing structures that serve as individual lodging spaces of a motel or camp meeting

== Places ==
- Cabin, Shropshire, England
- Cabins, West Virginia, US

== Transportation ==
- Cabin (aircraft)
- Cabin (automobile), the interior of an automobile
- Cabin (ship)
- Cabin (truck), an enclosed space where the driver is seated
- Cabin car or caboose, a crewed rail transport vehicle at the end of a freight train
- Cabin cruiser, a boat with enclosed accommodation
- Cabin motorcycle, a fully or semi-enclosed motorcycle

== Other uses ==
- Cabin (Ferris wheel), a passenger compartment
- Cabin (band), an American indie rock band
- "The Cabin", a song by Haley Blais from Wisecrack
- The Cabin, 2018 Swedish-American horror film

== See also ==
- Cabin rights, an American frontier claim to land
- Cab (disambiguation)
- Cabin boy (disambiguation)
- Cabin fever (disambiguation)
