= Cabin Fever (2016 film) =

Film by Travis Zariwny

- Theatrical release poster
- Directed by: Travis Z
- Written by: Eli Roth; Randy Pearlstein
- Story by: Eli Roth
- Based on: Cabin Fever by Eli Roth
- Produced by: Evan Astrowsky; Christopher Lemole; Tim Zajaros
- Starring: Samuel Davis; Gage Golightly; Matthew Daddario; Nadine Crocker; Dustin Ingram
- Cinematography: Gavin Kelly
- Edited by: Kyle Tekiela
- Music by: Kevin Riepl
- Production companies: Armory Films; Contend; Dragonfly Entertainment; Pelican Point Media
- Distributed by: IFC Midnight
- Release date: February 12, 2016 (United States)
- Running time: 98 minutes
- Country: United States
- Language: English
- Box office: $39,065

Cabin Fever is a 2016 American horror film directed by Travis Zariwny (Note: Under the pseudonym Travis Z) and written by Eli Roth and Randy Pearlstein as a remake of Roth's 2002 film of the same name and the fourth and final installment in the Cabin Fever franchise. The film stars Samuel Davis, Gage Golightly, Matthew Daddario, Nadine Crocker, and Dustin Ingram. The film was released on February 12, 2016, by IFC Midnight. The film was universally panned by critics and underperformed at the box office.

== Plot ==
In the woods, a hermit named Henry discovers his dog has died from a mysterious illness and is sprayed by its blood. Five young friends, Paul, Karen, Bert, Jeff and Marcy have rented a cabin in the same woods for a week-long vacation. The group stops for supplies at a General Store, where Dennis, the mentally impaired son of the store manager, unexpectedly bites Paul's hand.

As Bert ventures into the woods to shoot squirrels, he accidentally shoots Henry. Upon realizing Henry is infected with a disease, he panics and flees, keeping quiet about the incident.

Later that evening, while the group hang out around a campfire, a stranger who calls himself Grim and his Belgian Malinois dog, Dr. Mambo, gatecrash their evening.

Later that night, Henry stumbles into the cabin in search of help. Bert slams the door in his face and the desperate man tries to steal the group's vehicle. A conflict ensues, during which the five friends accidentally cripple their car and set Henry on fire. The infected man runs off into the woods.

The next day, Jeff and Bert head out in search of help. They encounter a farmer who offers to help them, but hastily leave when they discover that Henry is her cousin. Meanwhile, Deputy Winston arrives at the cabin to investigate reports of the previous night's commotion. Paul explains things without mentioning Henry's presumed death. Winston promises to send a tow truck before departing.

Dr. Mambo returns to the cabin without Grim and seemingly infected. He threatens Paul and Bert, before Marcy scares him off with the rifle.

While Paul and Karen make out, they discover that Karen is infected with the flesh-eating disease and her leg has started to decay. Fearful of contagion, the others lock her in the shed. Paul leaves on foot to find help, but the only people he encounters chase him away, mistaking him for a peeping Tom.

The following morning, the group's attempt to evacuate is botched when Karen vomits blood all over the car's interior. While Bert drives to the general store alone, Jeff abandons everybody and flees to a remote shack. Marcy and Paul lament their poor chances of surviving and have sex, believing they won't live long enough to regret it. They later discover marks on Marcy's back that reveals she, too, is sick.

At the general store, Dennis bites Bert's hand just as he did with Paul. His father, Tommy, lashes out at Bert for exposing his son to the virus, and he and his friends chase Bert down in order to contain the disease. While searching for help, Paul encounters the severely-burnt but still alive Henry in the lake. Henry attacks Paul, who fends him off and finally kills him.

Marcy draws a bath and shaves her legs, causing the infected flesh to gruesomely peel from her body. She stumbles outside in distress and is mauled to death by Dr. Mambo.

Paul returns to the boat shed where Karen begs him to kill her. His gun is empty and since he's unable to finish the job of splitting her face with a shovel, Paul sets the shed on fire and watches in horror as Karen is burned alive. Bert makes it back to the cabin, but he is followed and shot dead by Tommy. Paul recovers Bert's rifle and guns down Tommy and his two accomplices. Paul escapes in Tommy's truck, but crashes it into a tree and explodes. Covered in blood, Paul stumbles upon a small campfire party attended by Deputy Winston. Winston receives a radio call from the sheriff ordering her to shoot Paul on sight. However, Paul convinces Winston to let him go instead.

The next morning, Jeff returns to the cabin. He finds the corpses of his friends and Tommy's accomplices, and rejoices in having survived the ordeal himself, until he sees signs of the infection on his hand. He is then shot and killed by Deputy Winston with a sniper rifle. Paul succumbs to infection and drops dead in the woods where Dennis discovers his corpse. Back at the cabin, as the authorities and a hazmat crew clean up the scene, it's revealed that Jeff's corpse landed near the lake, which is now infected with his blood.

== Cast ==
- Samuel Davis as Paul
- Gage Golightly as Karen
- Matthew Daddario as Jeff
- Nadine Crocker as Marcy
- Dustin Ingram as Bert
- Randy Schulman as Henry, Infected Hermit
- George Griffith as Cadwell, Store Owner
- Derrick R. Means as Dennis, The Boy With Mask
- Louise Linton as Deputy Winston
- Timothy G. Zajaros as Connor / Grim
- Aaron Trainor as Tommy
- Jason Rouse as Fenster
- Benton Morris as Baily
- Laura Kenny as Hog Lady
- Teresa Decher as Emily Bishop
- Travis Zariwny as Sheriff Lincoln

== Production ==
In 2011, alongside the announcement of Cabin Fever: Patient Zero, a fourth film was revealed to be in development at Indomina and Hypotenuse Pictures (Films original producer Evan Astrowsky's Production Company), with both films expected to shoot back-to-back. Texas Chainsaw 3D screenwriters Adam Marcus and Debra Marcus were tapped to pen the script, entitled Cabin Fever: Outbreak, with a planned production start of Spring 2012 in the Dominican Republic. The initial plot served as direct sequel to Patient Zero and followed a doctor on a Caribbean island attempting to contain the virus. However, story changes were made with the final iteration taking place on a cruise ship. Production for Patient Zero was delayed to August and then to October 2012, with no mention of any further updates on Outbreak. By May 2013, Voltage Pictures and Idomina proposed a trilogy of films following Patient Zero.

By April 2014, plans for Outbreak were scrapped altogether in favor of producing a remake of the original film. By this point, Indomina had moved on from the project, while Cassian Elwes and Evan Astrowsky boarded the film as producers. Astrowsky and Elwes conceived of the remake after a chance encounter with Eli Roth at the Academy Awards bar between awards. In October, Travis Zariwny, director of The Midnight Man and Intruder, was announced as director and would utilize the original script written by Eli Roth and Randy Pearlstein. That same month, Teen Wolf actress Gage Golightly, Dustin Ingram, Samuel Davis, Matthew Daddario, and Nadine Cocker joined the cast, while Chris Lemole and Tim Zajaros signed on to produce the film alongside Astrowsky, while Elwes and Roth would act as executive producers. Impressed with Zariwny's pitch, Roth decided to join the film, but had no involvement due to his obligations to South of Hell.

While using the original script from Roth and Pearlstein, Zariwny made his own changes to the script; such as making the characters more likable, changed the deaths of the characters, incorporated elements Roth was not able to in the original, and removed the comedic aspects. Zariwny also trimmed the page count from 124 to only 92. In this version, the character of Deputy Winston is gender-swapped, this time played by Louise Linton, a frequent collaborator of Zariwny. The director opted to make this choice because he felt there was no other way to emulate the performance of Giuseppe Andrews, who portrayed the character in Cabin Fever and Cabin Fever 2: Spring Fever.

Principal photography took place in Portland, Oregon in October 2014.

== Release ==
In September 2015, IFC Midnight acquired North American distribution rights to the film, The film was released for limited release and through video on demand on February 12, 2016.

=== Home media ===
The film was released on DVD and Blu-ray on July 5, 2016. In Australia, it was released early on April 28, 2016. It was later released on home media on June 27, 2016, in the UK and Ireland with a behind the scenes feature.

== Reception ==
=== Critical response ===
On Rotten Tomatoes, the film has a rare approval rating of 0% based on 30 reviews, with an average rating of 2.60/10. The site's critics' consensus reads: "No need for a quarantine -- enthusiasm for this inert remake is not contagious." On Metacritic, the film holds a rating of 14 out of 100, based on 7 critics, indicating "overwhelming dislike".

Geoff Berkshire of Variety gave the film a negative review, writing: "It's little surprise that Roth himself is the exec producer of this nearly beat-for-beat redo. Who else would feel as much passion for the middling material? And who better to ensure the copy does nothing to improve on the original? The silver lining of a day-and-date limited theatrical and VOD release is that there's no chance this repurposed dud duplicates the original's commercial performance." Glenn Kenny of The New York Times also gave the film a negative review, writing: "Who benefits from the existence of this film? Certainly not the largely bland ensemble of post-adolescent actors cast as the leads, who here can scarcely be called characters." Peter Bradshaw of The Guardian gave the film a score of 1/5 stars, writing: "There is no interesting new slant on this material: it’s just the same old stuff, being served up in a tired and cynical fashion, without anything inventive in the way of humour or fear." Martin Tsai of the Los Angeles Times wrote: "One criticism often lobbed against remakes is that they dumb down the originals. Cabin Fever … is guilty as charged."
