= Garbanzo Gas =

Garbanzo Gas is a 2007 American independent comedy film written, directed, edited, and filmed by Giuseppe Andrews. The film revolves around Cow (played by Vietnam Ron), who wins an all-expenses paid, weekend vacation to a motel, where it meets two friends, Alan (played by Walt Dongo) and Leon (Played by Miles Dougal) who plan to commit suicide after their stay in the hotel for fear of gambling debts. The trio along the way, cross paths with two serial killers, one who is compelled to kill by a talking dish towel, and the other who is compelled to kill by a talking orthopedic shoe.

The film was shot and edited in the span of two days, a goal which Andrews had set for himself in pre-production.

Garbanzo Gas is the subject of the documentary Giuseppe Makes a Movie, directed by Adam Rifkin, producer of Garbanzo Gas.
