= All the Same (disambiguation) =

"All the Same" is a song by Sick Puppies.

All the Same may also refer to:

- "All the Same", a song by Joshua Homme, Nick Oliveri, and Brad Wilk from The Dangerous Lives of Altar Boys soundtrack
- "All the Same", a song by Quasi from Field Studies
- "All the Same", a song by Blue Meanies (Illinois band)
- "All the Same", a song by Roam from Backbone
- "All The Same", a song by Deerhunter from Fading Frontier
- "All the Same", a song by Does It Offend You, Yeah?
- "All the Same", a song by Maggie Rogers from Don't Forget Me
