= Touch Me in the Morning =

Touch Me in the Morning may refer to:

- Touch Me in the Morning (album), a 1973 album by Diana Ross
  - "Touch Me in the Morning" (song), a 1973 song by Diana Ross
- Touch Me in the Morning (film), a 1999 American film by Giuseppe Andrews
