= Dustin Ingram =

American actor and musician

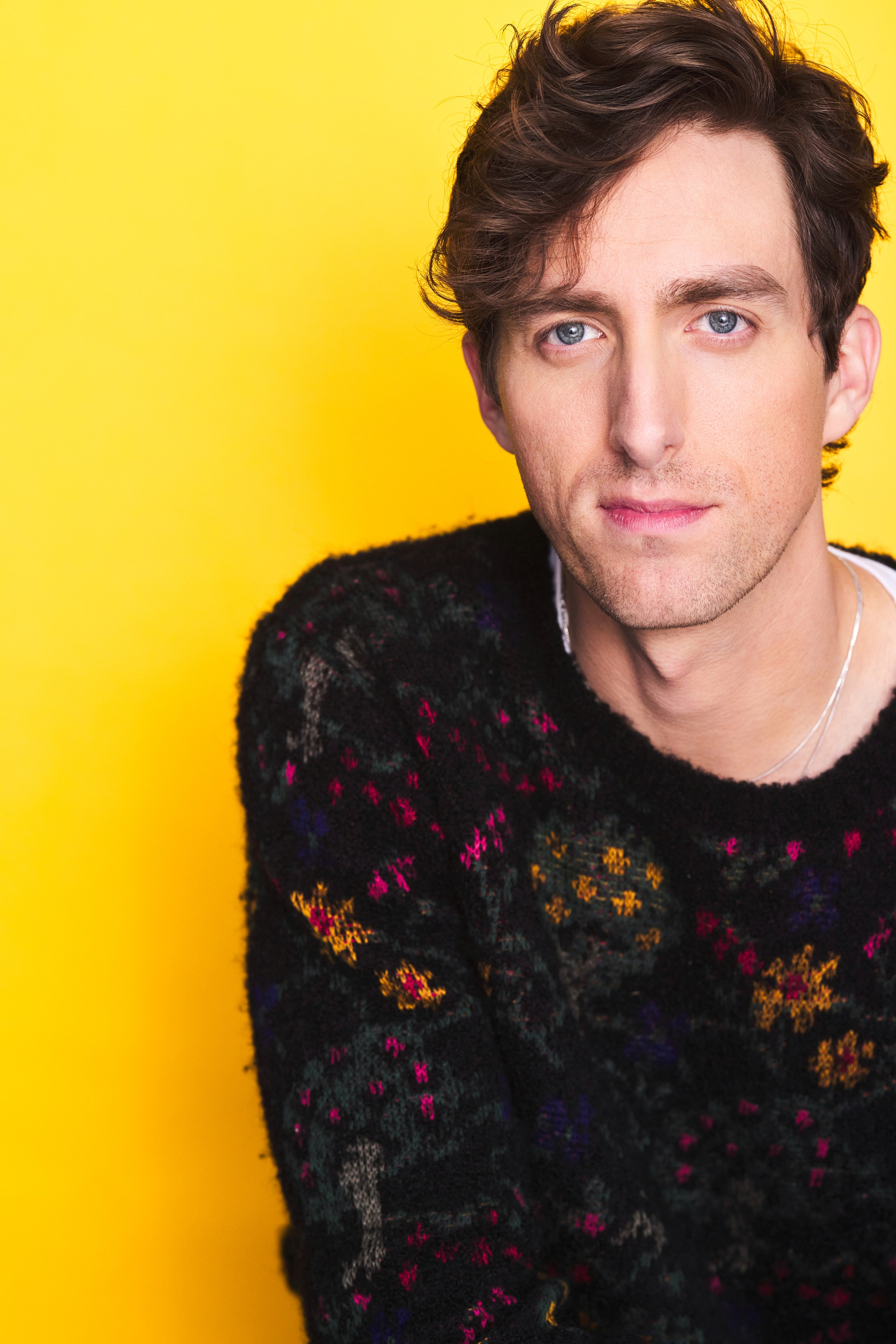
- Ingram in 2024
- Born: Dustin Kyle Ingram; January 25, 1990 (age 36); Riverside County, California, U.S.
- Occupations: Actor, musician
- Years active: 2003–present

Dustin Kyle Ingram (born January 25, 1990) is an American actor and musician. He is best known for his role as Bert in the 2016 remake of Cabin Fever, as Duane Ogilvy in Nickelodeon's Unfabulous, and as Agent Petey in HBO's Watchmen.

== Early life and career ==
Ingram was born in Riverside County, California to Raymond and Cindy (née Johnson) Ingraham. The child of two actors, Ingram developed an early appreciation for theater and production. Ingram had his first role at the age of 6 in a production of Joseph and the Amazing Technicolor Dreamcoat.

After his time in theater, Ingram sought a career in film and television, saying that he asked himself the question, “What would it be like to strive for complete and ultimate truth in a performance rather than making sure the people in the back row of a 3,000 seat theater knew what you were feeling?”. At 15, he landed his first major role as Duane Oglivy in Unfabulous (2004-2007).

In 2016, Ingram starred in a remake of Cabin Fever, a 2002 horror film directed, written, and produced by Eli Roth who also produced the remake.

In 2019, he was cast in Watchmen, a TV series based on the DC Comics limited series of the same name.

Despite his current focus on television and film, Ingram continues to occasionally star in plays. In 2012, he portrayed the lead role of Jared in Annie Baker's Barrymore Award-winning Body Awareness.

Ingram is also a musician, leading the "one-man band" Gypzïrafe.

== Filmography ==
=== Film ===
Year	Title	Role	Notes
2003	Carter's Wish	Billy Wachowski	Short film
2005	Sky High	Carbon Copy Kid	
2010	Meet Monica Velour	Tobe	
2010	Sneak Out	Andrew	Short film
2011	Paranormal Activity 3	Randy Rosen	
2014	Bar America	Hank	
2016	Cabin Fever	Bert	
2016	Salt Water	Toast	
2017	Magnum Opus	Private Sattler	
2022	The Cow	Braydon	
2022	Secret Headquarters	Jerry	
2024	Jane Austen's Period Drama	Dr. Bangley	Short film
2026	Loves Company	Dan	Song credit

=== Television ===
Year	Title	Role	Notes
2004–2007	Unfabulous	Duane Ogilvy	32 episodes
2007	The Suite Life of Zack and Cody	Extra No. 265	Episode: "Nugget of History"
2008	Everybody Hates Chris	Team Leader	Episode: "Everybody Hates Tattaglia"
2009	There Will Be Brawl	Saki	2 episodes
2009	Brothers	Cody	Episode: "Mike's Comeback"
2010	Zeke and Luther	Customer 32	Episode: "Local Hero"
2010	Glee	Pizza Guy	Episode: "Audition"
2012	NCIS: Los Angeles	Jeff Foster	Episode: "Sans Voir (Part I)"
2013	Browsers	Josh Gribb	Television movie
2013	The Neighbors	Raffi	Episode: "Supreme Like Me"
2013	Betas	Stuart	2 episodes
2014	Longmire	Trey/Wolverine	Episode: "In the Pines"
2014	True Blood	Ronnie	4 episodes
2014	Lab Rats	Scott	4 episodes
2015	Castle	Chad	Episode: "Dead from New York"
2015	Bones	Big Phill Leeds	Episode: "The Promise in the Palace"
2016	Vinyl	Alice Cooper	Episode: "Whispered Secrets"
2016	The Last Tycoon	Wylie White	Episode: "Pilot"
2016	Murder in the First	Noah Carson	Episode: "Kat's Meow"
2017	Sun Records	Carl Perkins	2 episodes
2018	NCIS	Ozzie Duncan	Episode: "Keep Your Friends Close"
2018–2019	The Magicians	Hyman Cooper	6 episodes
2019	Watchmen	Agent Petey	3 episodes
2019–2020	Good Trouble	Alex Wood	16 episodes
2020	Utopia	Tallman	1 episode
2021	Looks Like His Dog	Man with Dog	Liberty Mutual Television Advertisement
2022–2023	National Treasure: Edge of History	Myles	4 episodes
