= Briar Patch (film) =

- Directed by: Zev Berman
- Written by: Deborah Pryor
- Produced by: Sam Froelich; Andrea Magder
- Starring: Dominique Swain; Henry Thomas; Arie Verveen; James Urbaniak; Karen Allen
- Cinematography: Scot Kevan
- Edited by: Martin Apelbaum; Wayde Faust; Eric Strand
- Music by: Nathan Barr
- Production companies: Down Home Entertainment; Tonic Films
- Release date: April 2002 (United States)
- Running time: 100 minutes
- Country: United States
- Language: English

Briar Patch (alternatively titled Plain Dirty) is a 2002 American romantic thriller drama film directed by Zev Berman, starring Dominique Swain, Henry Thomas, Arie Verveen, James Urbaniak and Karen Allen.

== Plot ==
Inez Macbeth (Dominique Swain) and Edgar Macbeth (Henry Thomas) are an unhappy married couple, who are in poverty, living in a rundown cabin somewhere in the rural countryside near a small town. Edgar is abusive to Inez and jealous, always accusing her of seeing someone else when she leaves the house to hang out with friends, and Inez hates him and wants out of the relationship. Edgar has his strange childhood friend Flowers (Arie Verveen) who lives in an RV in the woods, to keep an eye on her. Flowers seems to take a liking to Inez, but she finds him creepy.

Inez visits her friend Butcher Lee (Karen Allen) who is supposedly a witch and can see the future. Butcher tells her that she had a vision earlier that a man was standing at a door at the top of a stairs and he wanted to see her. Inez thinks this is her true love. It's later revealed she's been having an affair and seeing a kind wealthy man named Druden Hunt (James Urbaniak). They kiss and give each other gifts as Flowers secretly catches them. When he returns to Edgar he lies saying she was with Butcher the whole time. Edgar and Flowers break into a jewelry store in town and successfully rob it. Druden asks Inez to runaway with him to Richmond, which she accepts. When Inez returns home late, Edgar starts a fight and becomes even more angry when he sees Inez wearing the locket Druden gave her. He viciously attacks her and injures her eye. Afterwards, he gives her a necklace he stole and forces her to say she loves him. Flowers shows up, observing them, but then leaves after Edgar tries to invite him in.

Inez has to wear a patch over her injured eye now. Edgar, with Flowers tagging along, tries to win back her affection by buying her stuff at the store. Edgar has a meltdown over Inez rejecting his gifts and she runs off from them, while Edgar and Flowers are pulled over by Officer Avon (Debra Monk), who gives Edgar a warning. Inez goes to Butcher and she tries to convince Inez to tell the police so Edgar will be taken away. Inez decides go back to him so he'll calm down and when she returns home Edgar decides to keep her chained to the house. Inez tries to kill him with a baseball bat the next morning, but backs out.

Edgar leaves to go sell the rest of the jewelry he stole and he has Flowers watch Inez. Flowers has a conversation with Inez about her grandfather giving him his first black eye after he was spying on him. The conversation weirdly changes to her toes and he sucks on them, then Inez leaves in disgust. At Druden's birthday party, he is shown to be unhappy with the whole thing and seems bored with his life, family and friends. In the backyard, Inez asks Flowers if he is really loyal to Edgar to which he responds no. At her request, Flowers pulls her around in a wagon while she talks about violent dreams, one especially with Edgar dying. The two then decide to come up with a plan to get rid of Edgar. Flowers gets Edgar's hidden money in his lock box and Inez can finally be free.

With the jewelry not giving Edgar enough money and his marijuana plants being a fail, Flowers tells Edgar about a man that can give him better seeds, all he has to do is write him a letter and Flowers will mail it to him. Edgar does it and later the man writes back and wants Edgar to meet him somewhere in the woods near the swamp. Flowers and Inez actually wrote back with another letter pretending to be the man to lure Edgar away. Flowers has Inez go into town to get drunk and party with other people, to make it look like she and Edgar were out having fun and he left her there after drinking. Flowers surprises Edgar in the woods with alcohol which Edgar instantly takes. When Edgar finally gets really drunk, Flowers strangles him to death while wearing oven mitts, then dumps his body in the swamp waters. At midnight, Inez goes home and starts packing up to leave and is startled when Flowers shows up. She gives him Edgar's money, but to her surprise he starts to burn it. Inez discovers Flowers didn't want the money. He is in love with her and wanted her all for himself this whole time. Inez rejects Flowers, but ends up sleeping with him outside, hoping it will make him stop.

The next day, Druden is waiting for her at his place so they can runaway together, but he goes to her cabin when she doesn't show up. He finds her with Flowers and a fight almost starts when he thinks Flowers was helping Edgar abuse her. Officer Avon shows up and informs Inez that Edgar is dead, appearing to have accidentally drowned after getting drunk in the swamp. Inez and Druden leave, while Avon tries to get information from Flowers to what is going on between Inez and Druden, but he acts like he knows nothing. Inez moves in with Druden and all is happy. She becomes disappointed when he changes his mind about moving to Richmond since Edgar is now dead and can't bother them anymore. She tries to kill a goose to make food in the kitchen and is embarrassed when Druden's rich family suddenly show up to see her all bloody and messy.

Later that night, Flowers suddenly breaks in, telling her she doesn't belong with Druden, then tries to force himself on her, before she makes him leave. Druden wants to go after Flowers, but Inez convinces him to stay and have sex with her. Afterwards, Inez tells Druden the truth on how she had Flowers murder Edgar so they can be together. Druden is appalled by the confession and wants to go to the police. Inez becomes hurt by this and Druden accidentally hurts her other eye with her suitcase when she attempts to go. Inez confronts Butcher, calling her a fake and accuses her of lying about the visions, telling her Druden doesn't love her and is gonna send her away to prison. Inez passes out after crying in Butcher's arms just as Flowers shows up. He tells Butcher that he is gonna fix everything and Butcher realizes something about him. Inez wakes up sometime later and decides to go look for Flowers to murder him. Flowers calls Avon, telling her that Druden murdered Edgar so Inez could be with him and he is arrested for the murder.

Flowers goes into the woods and enters a basement door that leads underground. Inez is waiting for him there and he tells her what he has done for her. Inez is surprised, repeatedly shouting "You done that for me!?", while scaring him out of the basement with the gun. She tackles him to the ground and wants to kill him, but she changes her mind. She starts to walk away, then tells him off that she doesn't have to be with him and can go anywhere she wants, which Flowers is fine with. Inez runs back to him, touching his face, while saying "It's you!" realizing he must be her true love and they both hug and caress each other in the rain.

== Cast ==
- Dominique Swain as Inez Macbeth
- Henry Thomas as Edgar Macbeth
- Arie Verveen as Flowers
- James Urbaniak as Druden Hunt
- Karen Allen as Butcher Lee
- Debra Monk as Officer Avon
- Blake Lindsley as Raeburn

== Reception ==
Contactmusic.com gave the film a rating of 2/5 wrote, "This boring melodrama has little going for it, proving once again that no one will ever give Swain the chance to appear in a movie that doesn't suck out loud."

Film Threat wrote that the film is "so bleak that it actually fails to satisfy, and sympathy is hard to come by for any of the characters, let alone Inez."

Scott Foundas of Variety called the film a "Southern Gothic melodrama so deep-fried you can just about feel your arteries hardening", and wrote that it "might have worked as a rollicking Tennessee Williams send-up, if only the filmmakers weren’t so unwaveringly straight-faced."
