= Trailer Town =

- Directed by: Giuseppe Andrews
- Written by: Giuseppe Andrews
- Produced by: Giuseppe Andrews
- Starring: Bill Nowlin; Walt Dongo; Bill Tyree; Stan Patrick; Gayle Wells; Sparky Sparks; Vietnam Ron
- Edited by: Giuseppe Andrews
- Distributed by: Troma Entertainment
- Release date: March 9, 2003 (New York Underground Film Festival)
- Running time: 80 minutes
- Country: United States
- Language: English

Trailer Town is a 2003 low-budget film shot on digital video, written and directed by Giuseppe Andrews and distributed by Troma Entertainment. The film is set in the trailer park in Florida where Andrews lives and stars many of the people who were his neighbors at the time. The film has drawn comparisons to the cult films of John Waters for its semi-realistic yet off-the-wall portrayal of lower-class individuals.

== Home media ==
The film was at one time available for on-demand viewing and DVD rental on Netflix.
