= Caught (1996 film) =

- Theatrical release poster
- Directed by: Robert M. Young
- Written by: Edward Pomerantz
- Produced by: Richard Brick
- Starring: Edward James Olmos; Arie Verveen; María Conchita Alonso; Bitty Schram
- Cinematography: Michael F. Barrow
- Edited by: Norman Buckley
- Music by: Chris Botti
- Distributed by: Sony Pictures Classics
- Release date: January 24, 1996
- Running time: 110 minutes
- Country: United States
- Language: English

Caught is a 1996 erotic thriller film about a drifter who disrupts the simple life of a fish market owner and his wife. The film was directed by Robert M. Young, and stars Edward James Olmos, Arie Verveen, María Conchita Alonso, and Bitty Schram.

== Plot ==
Joe and Betty, husband and wife, own and run a small Jersey City retail fish market (store). They have a son, Danny, who has left for Los Angeles to try to become an actor. Joe's job is his main focus and he feels that Betty interferes with it. By contrast, Betty is frustrated that he does not accept a good offer to sell the business and feels neglected when Joe goes to bed early as he has to get an early start to buy fish from the wholesale market.

Into their life comes Nick, a young homeless man. Joe and Betty take a liking to Nick and offer him a job as well as lodging in Danny's old room. Nick becomes an apprentice to Joe, showing an interest in the business that Danny never did. Nick also shows an interest in Betty, and it's mutual.

By the time Danny returns home, he finds that he has been all but replaced in the family by a surrogate son, and also rightly suspects that this interloper is having an affair with his mother.

== Cast ==
- Edward James Olmos as Joe
- María Conchita Alonso as Betty
- Arie Verveen as Nick
- Steven Schub as Danny
- Bitty Schram as Amy
- Shawn Elliott as Santiago
- Sandra Kazan as Bag Lady
- Edward Pomerantz as Man In Window
- Joseph D'Onofrio as Crack Dealing Kid
- Dominick Oliveri as Fish Dealer
- Antonio Oliveri as John "Big John"
- Irma St. Paule as Fish Store Customer
