= 72 Hours (2024 film) =

- Film poster
- Directed by: Christian Sesma
- Written by: Christian Sesma; Sean Crayne
- Story by: Roberto Sanchez
- Produced by: Manoj Narender Madnani; Ojan Missaghi; David Wachs
- Starring: Cam Gigandet; Sam Trammell; Pierson Fodé; Nicky Whelan; Jessica Serfaty; Max Amini
- Cinematography: Tyler Eckels
- Edited by: Eric Potter
- Production companies: Beacon Media; Toric Films; Workhorse Cinema
- Distributed by: Brainstorm Media
- Release date: November 1, 2024
- Country: United States
- Language: English

72 Hours is a 2024 American action thriller film directed by Christian Sesma and starring Cam Gigandet and Sam Trammell.

It was released in limited theaters on November 1, 2024.

== Plot ==
At the FBI Field Office in Georgia, senior agent Sebastian James and his team remotely monitor an unfolding guns-for-crypto transaction at night, concerned for their undercover agent Sean. An unknown third party closes in on them, so Carl speeds off with Sean to complete the transfer at a hotel. Marco calls Carl to alert him that Sean is undercover, so he kills Sean and takes off with the laptop and hard drive before the FBI can get him.

A few days later, an intoxicated Sebastian wakes up late. Morose over his agent’s loss, he finally signs divorce papers before heading over to his younger brother Alex’s fancy rural home. It’s his niece Christina’s sixteenth birthday. He’s late to the party. But he’s in time to witness Alex’s expensive gift to his daughter: a new BMW. Alex’s life appears to be going well, while Sebastian laments his bad week and failed marriage. Brothers take a moment to catch up over beers.

Trying again, the crypto deal takes place late at night south of Grantville as Sebastian and two agents monitor from a van. It’s dark. There are new faces. Once the transfer is successful, agents raid the place. One of the hooded figures flees with cash and Sebastian follows. At gunpoint, he reveals himself. Sebastian is horrified to see that it’s his own brother. After a bitter feud, Alex reminds him that he put work over family.

Now, Tye Revello, a gun smuggler, is in town. He’s flown from California to clean up this mess. He and Marco go way back. Alex has been their accountant. First they beat up Carl for letting in the rat. Then they raid Alex’s house, certain he’s with the FBI and has the hard drive. Alex and his wife escape, but daughter Christina is kidnapped and taken to Tye’s estate. Tye tells Alex he has 72 hours to return the hard drive.

Alex and Sebastian put together a crew: mechanic Tess, gambler Johnny and private mercenary Vincent. Johnny knows Daun, who supplies them with guns—which are from Tye. After Marco threatens him over this, Daun summons Johnny to his place to sell him out.

Daun calmly lights a cigarette and recounts to Johnny a traumatic childhood accident. This give time for Marco’s men to surround them. Years ago, their family vehicle crashed into a river and he lost his brother. Johnny gets trapped inside and killed. Duan warns Tye that they’re coming, but Tye’s answer is a fatal shot from a hitman.

The next day, Tye moves everything to a warehouse where Alex will finally meet him. Tye’s boss reminds him of client reactions should they not be successful, which include government agencies. At the warehouse, it all goes down fast. Tess picks off Tye’s guys from above and Vincent blows up their vehicles. Tye holds a gun to Christina’s head even after Alex hands over the hard drive. But she head butts Tye, allowing Tess to shoot him.

Christina is reunited with her parents and Sebastian retires to spend more time with his own family.

== Cast ==
- Cam Gigandet
- Sam Trammell
- Pierson Fodé
- Nicky Whelan
- Jessica Serfaty
- Max Amini

== Production ==
In October 2022, it was announced that Gigandet and Trammell were cast in the film. In November 2022, it was announced that Fodé, Whelan, Serafty and Amini were also cast in the film.

In February 2023, it was announced that the film was in post-production.

== Release ==
72 Hours was released in limited theaters by Brainstorm Media on November 1, 2024.
