= Pierson Fodé =

American actor (born 1991)

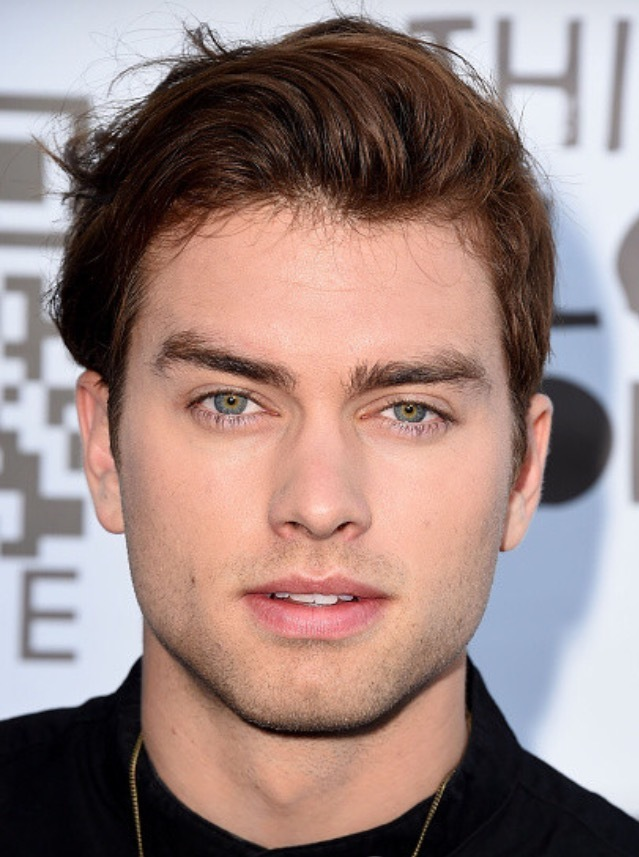
- Fodé in August 2015
- Born: November 6, 1991 (age 34); Moses Lake, Washington, U.S.
- Occupations: Actor; model
- Years active: 2012–present
- Height: 6 ft 4 in (1.93m)

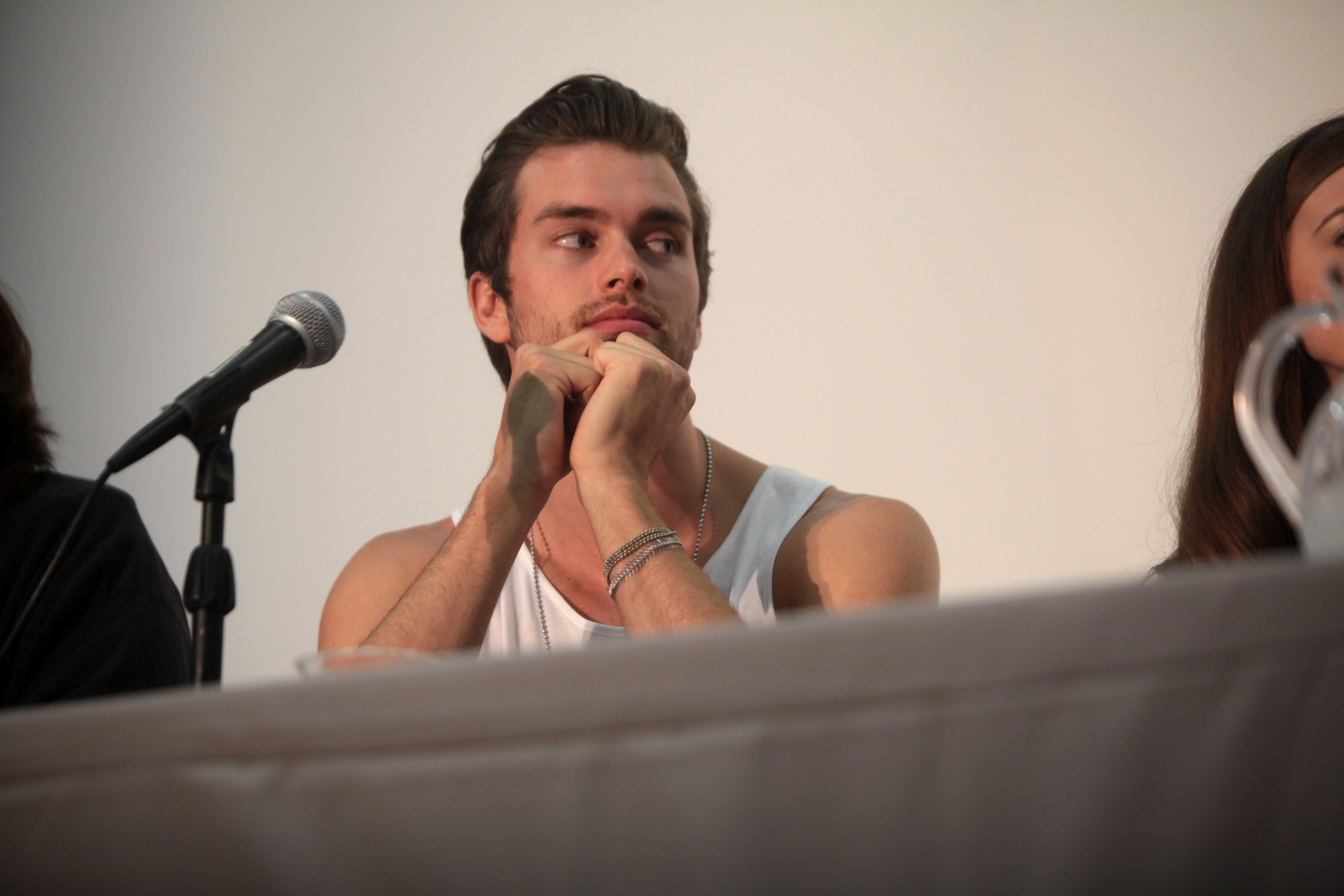
Fodé at VidCon 2014

Pierson Dane Fodé (born November 6, 1991) is an American actor, Internet personality, and model known for his roles as Brooks on Disney Channel's Jessie and Ely in the 2015 romantic comedy film Naomi and Ely's No Kiss List. Fodé has gone on to portray Thomas Forrester on the CBS drama series The Bold and the Beautiful, as well as make appearances in Tacoma FD, Dynasty, Animal Kingdom, and The Real Bros of Simi Valley.

== Early life ==
Fodé was born in Moses Lake, Washington, a small town in eastern Washington, to Ron and Robin. He has two older brothers, Preston and Payton, and a younger sister, Pharron. He currently resides in Los Angeles.

== Career ==
=== Acting ===
Fodé made his acting debut in 2012 in the Nickelodeon sitcom iCarly, where he appeared as Todd. He appeared in the television film Wrath of God: Confrontation as Kruger and had a guest role in Hello Ladies.

From 2013 to 2014, Fodé portrayed Blazer in the web series Storytellers. In 2014, he starred in the horror film Indigenous, which was shown at the Tribeca Film Festival, and acted in films Kill Game and Drag Worms. He also had a recurring role in the Disney Channel series Jessie for a five-episode story arc.

In 2015, Fodé starred opposite Victoria Justice as “Ely” in the romantic comedy indie film Naomi and Ely's No Kiss List. He also returned to TV to take over the role of Thomas Forrester on the CBS Daytime soap opera The Bold and the Beautiful. On September 7, 2017, Soap Opera Digest announced that Fodé would depart the role of Thomas; he made his last appearance on September 13, 2017 before reprising his portrayal of Thomas for a short-term storyline in 2018.

Fodé appears in the film The Man from Toronto. In 2025, Fode starred as bachelor Trey McAllen III in romantic comedy The Wrong Paris.

=== Model ===
Fodé signed to Wilhelmina Models in 2011. As a model, he has shot with Bruce Webber for Abercrombie & Fitch; Vanity Fair; G-Star; Demand Magazine; Akira Clothing; and Gilly Hicks.

== Personal life ==
In June 2019, Fodé revealed on Instagram that he suffered brain trauma and blackouts, and was wearing a heart monitor to help track his blackouts. He has made a full recovery and is actively engaged in trying to help others with serious trauma and those who want to help. Pierson enjoys riding his motorcycle; skydiving; parkour; and actively volunteering with charities such as Saving Innocence, Heifer International, and St. Jude in Los Angeles.

Fodé dated actress Saxon Sharbino from 2020 to 2022.

== Filmography ==
=== Film ===
Year	Title	Role
2014	Indigenous	Trevor
2015	Naomi and Ely's No Kiss List	Ely
2017	The Outcasts	Prom-goer
2017	MDMA	Alex
2018	Kill Game	Ryan
2020	It's Time	Brad Gaines
2020	Reboot Camp	Keef
2022	The Man from Toronto	The Man from Miami
2022	All the Men in My Life	Compeysom
2024	Out of Hand	David
2024	72 Hours	Tye Revello
2025	Marshmallow	Kazswar
2025	Dope Queens	Blake
2025	The Wrong Paris	Trey McAllen
2025	A Merry Little Ex-Mas	Chet Moore
2025	Swiped †	Michael Herd
TBA	The Last Mrs. Parrish †	

=== Television ===
Year	Title	Role	Notes
2012	iCarly	Todd	Episode: "iHalfoween"; deleted scene
2012	Wrath of God: Confrontation	Kruger	Television film
2013	Hello Ladies	Bartender	Episode: "Pool Party"
2014	The Assault	Reed	Television film
2014–2015	Jessie	Brooks Wentworth III	5 episodes
2015–2018	The Bold and the Beautiful	Thomas Forrester	Main role
2018	Hit the Floor	Chris Banks	Episode: "Bad Blood"
2019	Dynasty	Joel Turner	2 episodes
2020	Supergirl	Angus / Gregory Bauer	Episode: "Reality Bytes"
2020	Tacoma FD	Jan Damme	2 episodes
2022	Animal Kingdom	Ryan	2 episodes
2022	Leverage: Redemption	Kyle Fury	Episode: "The Tournament Job"
2023	Based on a True Story	Chloe's date	2 episodes

=== Web ===
Year	Title	Role	Notes
2012	Runaways	Jared Slater	13 episodes
2013	Storytellers	Blazer	5 episodes
2018	Real Bros of Simi Valley	Yonder	5 episodes

== Awards and nominations ==
List of acting awards and nominations
Year	Award	Category	Title	Result	Ref.
2016	Daytime Emmy Award	Outstanding Younger Actor in a Drama Series	The Bold and the Beautiful	Nominated	
2017	Daytime Emmy Award	Outstanding Younger Actor in a Drama Series	The Bold and the Beautiful	Nominated	
