= The Man from Toronto (2022 film) =

2022 film by Patrick Hughes

- Official release poster
- Directed by: Patrick Hughes
- Screenplay by: Robbie Fox; Chris Bremner
- Story by: Robbie Fox; Jason Blumenthal
- Produced by: Todd Black; Jason Blumenthal; Steve Tisch
- Starring: Kevin Hart; Woody Harrelson; Kaley Cuoco; Jasmine Mathews; Lela Loren; Pierson Fodé; Jencarlos Canela; Ellen Barkin
- Cinematography: Rob Hardy
- Edited by: Craig Alpert
- Music by: Ramin Djawadi
- Production companies: Sony Pictures; Bron Creative; Escape Artists
- Distributed by: Netflix
- Release date: June 24, 2022
- Running time: 112 minutes
- Country: United States
- Language: English
- Budget: $75 million

The Man from Toronto is a 2022 American action comedy film directed by Patrick Hughes. The film stars Kevin Hart and Woody Harrelson, Kaley Cuoco, Jasmine Mathews, Lela Loren, Pierson Fodé, Jencarlos Canela, and Ellen Barkin. The Man from Toronto was released on June 24, 2022, by Netflix. The film received generally negative reviews from critics.

== Plot ==
Teddy Jackson is a struggling fitness entrepreneur in Yorktown, Virginia who is fired from his job at a local gym for giving ad brochures without the gym's address. He decides not to tell his wife Lori and takes her to Onancock for her birthday. Leaving her at a spa, Teddy arrives at the wrong cabin, where a man named Coughlin is being held hostage. Mistaken for "The Man from Toronto", a mysterious assassin with a talent for brutal interrogation, the clueless Teddy manages to intimidate Coughlin into giving up a code. The cabin is raided by the FBI, who convinces Teddy to pose as the Man from Toronto to help capture would-be Venezuelan dictator Colonel Marín in exchange for the FBI paying off his overdue mortgage.

Much to Teddy's jealousy, an agent is assigned to accompany Lori and her friend Anne on a day of luxury in Washington, D.C., telling them the trip has been provided by Teddy's job. As Toronto, Teddy meets Marín's wife Daniela, who flies him to San Juan, Puerto Rico with orders to identify Green, Coughlin's partner, and bring him to the Colonel in D.C. En route, Teddy is ambushed by the Man from Toronto, whose real name is Randy. Planning to complete the $2 million contract by maintaining the ruse that Teddy is Toronto, Randy informs his Handler, who sends another assassin, the Man from Miami. Randy and Teddy arrive at a tech conference where Marín's men have captured Green's research team. Randy guides Teddy through interrogating the hostages; accidentally stabbing one of the men in the eye, Teddy vomits all over him and another hostage, who admits he is Green.

Green explains that he and Coughlin worked for DARPA developing a seismic bomb with a dual failsafe — Coughlin's code and Green's thumbprint — but realized they were working on behalf of Marín, who plans to use the weapon to assassinate the President of Venezuela during a visit to D.C. Teddy leaves the room while Randy cuts off Green's thumb and they are attacked by the Man from Miami, but manage to subdue him and escape. They return to D.C. to attend Lori's birthday dinner, where Randy finds himself connecting with Anne. Miami steals the thumb, which he and the Handler deliver to Marín. Teddy and Randy crash the deal and the FBI arrives; Randy flees with the $2 million, while Miami and the Handler escape. The FBI discovers that the thumb belonged to Marín's henchman as Randy chose not to let Marín arm the weapon. Teddy returns home to find Lori has gone to stay with her mother, having learned that he lost his job and lied to her.

Racing to stop her, Teddy is nearly killed by Miami, but Randy intervenes. They fight off several other assassins summoned by the Handler, who arrives demanding the money. She pursues them into a warehouse, where Teddy unintentionally drops her into a vat of boiling oil, frying her alive. Teddy is confronted by a final assassin, the Man from Tokyo, but Randy dispatches him with "Debora", his beloved 1969 Dodge Charger. Taking the car, Teddy reconciles with Lori at the train station, but parks on the tracks, and the car along with the money are destroyed by a train. A year later, Randy has followed through on his dream of opening his restaurant and is in a relationship with Anne. Teddy declares Randy as his partner in his new online gym, presenting him with a small payment toward replacing Debora, but Randy later calls Teddy during a live stream workout to threaten him.

== Cast ==
- Kevin Hart as Teddy Jackson
- Woody Harrelson as Randy AKA "The Man from Toronto"
- Jasmine Mathews as Lori Jackson
- Kaley Cuoco as Anne
- Kate Drummond as Agent Lawrence
- Ronnie Rowe as Agent Davis
- Alejandro de Hoyos as Colonel Marin
- Lela Loren as Daniela Marin
- Ellen Barkin as The Handler
- Pierson Fodé as "The Man from Miami"
- Tomohisa Yamashita as "The Man from Tokyo"
- Oleg Taktarov as "The Man from Moscow"
- Glenn Ennis, Justin Howell and Nathaniel Shuker as The Tacoma Brothers, collectively known as "The Man from Tacoma"
- Jencarlos Canela as Agent Santoro
- Martin Roach as Marty

== Production ==
It was announced in January 2020 that Patrick Hughes was set to direct Robbie Fox's script The Man from Toronto, with Jason Statham and Kevin Hart set to star; Jason Blumenthal, Todd Black, Bill Bannerman, and Steve Tisch producing through Escape Artists; and Sony Pictures distributing. In March, Statham abruptly exited the project six weeks prior to filming after clashing with producers over the tone and rating of the film. Woody Harrelson was cast to replace him. Kaley Cuoco was added to the cast in April, and Pierson Fodé was added in May. Jasmine Mathews, Ellen Barkin, Lela Loren, and Tomohisa Yamashita were added in October. Filming was set to begin in April 2020 in Atlanta, but in March, production was shut down due to the COVID-19 pandemic. Filming began on October 12, 2020, in the Toronto area. Many major scenes were filmed in Milton, Ontario. Rob Hardy was the cinematographer. During post-production, the film's music was composed by Ramin Djawadi.

== Release ==
The Man from Toronto was released on Netflix on June 24, 2022.

The film was initially scheduled to be theatrically released by Sony Pictures Releasing on November 20, 2020. On April 24, 2020, the date was moved to September 17, 2021, due to the COVID-19 pandemic delaying the film's production. In March 2021, it was pulled from the schedule. In April 2021, the film was rescheduled to be released on January 14, 2022. In November 2021, it was again delayed to August 12, 2022. Netflix signed a deal with Sony Pictures for the right to exclusively stream upcoming films, including this film after their theatrical and home media windows. In April 2022, Sony sold the film's distribution rights to Netflix, who is distributing the film worldwide excluding China, where Sony would distribute. Sony would also retain home entertainment and linear television rights to the film.

== Reception ==
On the review aggregator website Rotten Tomatoes, 23% of 73 critics' reviews are positive, with an average rating of 4/10. The website's consensus reads: "The Man From Toronto has a crackerjack premise and a fine pair of stars, but this toothless comedy mismatches its promising elements and winds up neither funny or thrilling." On Metacritic, the film has a weighted average score of 34 out of 100 based on reviews from 20 critics, indicating "generally unfavorable reviews".
