= Running Free (film) =

2000 American film

- Theatrical release poster
- Directed by: Sergei Bodrov
- Screenplay by: Jeanne Rosenberg
- Story by: Jeanne Rosenberg; Jean-Jacques Annaud
- Produced by: Jean-Jacques Annaud
- Starring: Chase Moore; Jan Decleir; Arie Verveen; Maria Geelbooi
- Cinematography: Dan Laustsen
- Edited by: Ray Lovejoy
- Music by: Nicola Piovani
- Production company: Columbia Pictures Moonlighting Films
- Distributed by: Sony Pictures Releasing
- Release date: June 2, 2000
- Running time: 85 minutes
- Countries: France; South Africa; United States
- Language: English
- Budget: $30 million
- Box office: $117,608

Running Free is a 2000 adventure drama film about a horse born into captivity in 1914. The film began production in 1998 and was released in the US in June 2000. It was directed by Sergei Bodrov, written and produced by Jean-Jacques Annaud, narrated by Lukas Haas, and distributed by Columbia Pictures.

== Plot summary ==
The film takes place primarily in German South-West Africa (now Namibia) in 1914 during World War I. An Arabian mare gives birth to a beautiful chestnut foal during a voyage to Swakopmund for work in the copper mines. The foal is separated from his mother upon arrival at a German colonial mining town and nearly expires from dehydration. He is subsequently saved from certain death by the 12-year-old sympathetic town stable boy, Richard (Chase Moore).

Richard allows Lucky to live in the thoroughbred stable - much to the resentment of Caesar, resident stallion and the prize horse of a wealthy colonial resident. Lucky is finally reunited with his mother, but she is killed by Caesar, furious that a workhorse has trespassed into his stable. Lucky wanders away from the town upon the death of his mother but returns after being struck by a desert snake. Richard treats the bite with Caesar's personal medication, but Richard is caught by an 8-year-old boy named Hans (Nicholas Trueb) despite being threatened with grave consequences from the latter's vengeful master (Jan Decleir). After being savagely punished, the duo depart to seek a much-sought oasis in the nearby mountains.

Alone in the Namib Desert with Lucky, Richard encounters a 12-year-old girl named Nyka (Maria Geelbooi) who teaches them how to survive in the harsh landscape. When they eventually return to the mining settlement, it is struck by a South African air raid. The local Schutztruppe garrison begins evacuating civilians, but Richard refuses to leave Lucky. He is forced to do so against his will when Allied biplanes return to strafe the railroad. Back at the camp, Lucky is repelled by Caesar and the other horses who treat him with contempt. He sets off for the oasis once more, vowing to beat Caesar one day.

After the evacuation, Nyka was left to watch over Lucky and even brought him to her tribe. When he picked up a familiar smell from the hunt done by Nyka's tribe, Lucky leaves. After making the acquaintance of several exotic animals in the desert, Lucky finally stumbles upon the hidden oasis. Two years later, he returns, defeats Caesar, and leads the remaining horses to the water.

Another twelve years pass with Lucky presiding over his new herd before a 26-year-old Richard (Arie Verveen) returns to South-West Africa, now a South African mandate. He finds the mining town deserted and flies into the desert searching for the oasis, which can be glimpsed from the sky. Upon landing, Richard stumbles upon the horses and is nearly killed by Lucky who attacks him. However, the latter soon recognizes his friend's unique whistle and the two rekindle their relationship. The movie ends with Lucky continuing to lead the herd through the Namib desert.

== Cast ==
- Chase Moore as Young Richard
- Arie Verveen as Richard
- Maria Geelbooi as Nyka
- Jan Decleir as Boss Man
- Graham Clarke as Mine Supervisor
- Patrick Lyster as Officer
- Morne Visser as Groom
- Dan J. Robbertse as Colonel
- Nicholas Trueb as Hans, The Boss' Son
- Lukas Haas as The Narrator Lucky

== Filming ==
The film was directed by Sergei Bodrov, who had previously directed the Oscar-nominated Prisoner of the Mountains. Screenwriter Jeanne Rosenberg had previously worked on the film adaptation of Black Stallion directed by Carroll Ballard. The film was produced by Jean-Jacques Annaud, who had previously worked on such films as Quest for Fire and The Bear. Animal action was monitored by American Humane with under the supervision of Animal Anti-Cruelty League.

== Reception ==
The film received generally negative reviews from critics. A New York Times review of the film was unenthusiastic, saying the film "vacillates between cutesy Disney-style anthropomorphism and Born Free exoticism" and that the "equine action sequences are poorly edited", while the musical score was "sugary". The reviewer was disappointed in the filmmakers, given their previous accomplishments, and the fact that the film portrayed horses as "masters of the obvious who think and speak entirely in movie cliches". Film critic Roger Ebert also panned the film, giving it 1.5 out of 4 stars. Ebert called the human characters "one-dimensional cartoons" and criticized the plot for historical and cultural errors. He was also disappointed with the filmmakers, given their previous efforts, and stated the film "might have been more persuasive if the boy had told the story of the horse, instead of the horse telling the story of the boy." The review aggregation website Rotten Tomatoes reports that 27% of critics have given the film a positive review based on 30 reviews, with an average score of 4.3/10. The site's consensus reads: "The narration in Running Free detracts from its beauty, and pushes the film to the point of absurdity."

== See also ==
- List of films about horses
