= Loves Company =

2026 American comedy film

- Release poster
- Directed by: Jason Laurits
- Written by: Jason Laurits
- Produced by: Joshua J. Bagnall; Jason Laurits; Sarah Davie
- Starring: Rachel Dratch; Jack Plotnick; Sarah Baker; Bryan Batt; Dustin Ingram; Lady Camden
- Cinematography: Joshua J. Bagnall
- Edited by: Kate Emerson
- Music by: Ronen Landa
- Production company: Glue Productions
- Distributed by: Tribeca Films
- Release dates: June 19, 2026 (Frameline50); November 10, 2026 (United States)
- Running time: 95 minutes
- Country: United States
- Language: English

Loves Company is a 2026 American comedy film written and directed by Jason Laurits. Starring Rachel Dratch and Jack Plotnick, it is a comic reworking of Misery in which a washed-up television personality is rescued by his only remaining fan. The film screened at Frameline50 in San Francisco and at the 2026 Reeling Film Festival in Chicago.

== Plot ==
Antoinette is a lonely fan of fading star Blake De Troy. After attempts to revitalize his career fall flat, Blake decides to visit his one remaining fan. When his limousine crashes into a swamp, he is rescued by Antoinette. Bruised and believing he has been kidnapped, Blake tries to escape, only to learn that Antoinette is a veterinary technician who is nursing him back to health. When a studio calls with an offer on condition that he becomes topical, Blake hatches a plan to use the "kidnapping" to relaunch his career and go viral.

== Cast ==
- Rachel Dratch as Antoinette
- Sarah Baker as Shoney
- Jack Plotnick as Blake De Troy
- Bryan Batt as Jimmy
- Dustin Ingram as Dan
- Brian Stivale as Hollywood Surprise Announcer/Cuddles/Kitty Litter Voice
- Paul Wilson as Don Humphries
- Tristen J. Winger as Tom
- Jeanne Caldarera as Nosey Shopper (credit only)
- Ned Yousef as Simms
- Evan Daigle as Dillon
- Sarai Betsabe as Axl Malone (as Betsy Borrego)
- Brinda Dixit as Game Show Announcer
- Lady Camden as Tyler
- Sarah Davie as Sarah

== Production ==
=== Filming ===
The film was shot in 15 days in and around New Orleans, standing in for the Florida Everglades. After filming, writer and director Jason Laurits decided to move from California to New Orleans.

== Release ==
On late July 2026, Tribeca Films acquired the distribution rights to the film, and set a November 10, 2026, digital release date.

== Reception ==
Brian Orndorf described the film as a riff on Stephen King's Misery that reverses its central situation, and praised Plotnick and Dratch for "sharp, amusing performances" that enliven the low-budget production. Screen Zealots called the casting "nothing short of perfect", singling out Dratch's broad but sympathetic performance and Plotnick's balance of ego and desperation.
