= Naomi and Ely's No Kiss List =

2015 film by Kristin Hanggi

- Official poster
- Directed by: Kristin Hanggi
- Screenplay by: Amy Andelson; Emily Meyer
- Based on: Naomi and Ely's No Kiss List by Rachel Cohn and David Levithan
- Produced by: Alexandra Milchan; Skip Klintworth; Lesley Vogel; Emily Gerson Saines; Kristin Hanggi; Robert Abramoff
- Starring: Victoria Justice; Pierson Fodé; Matthew Daddario; Ryan Ward; Griffin Newmanp; Monique Coleman; Daniel Flaherty
- Cinematography: Anka Malatynska
- Edited by: Michelle Harrison; Elisabet Ronalds
- Music by: Deborah Lurie
- Production company: One Two Films
- Distributed by: Millennium Entertainment
- Release dates: July 17, 2015 (Outfest); September 18, 2015
- Running time: 90 minutes
- Country: United States
- Language: English

Naomi and Ely's No Kiss List is a 2015 American romantic comedy-drama film written by Amy Andelson and Emily Meyer, and directed by Kristin Hanggi. It is based on the 2007 book of the same name by Rachel Cohn and David Levithan. The film stars Victoria Justice, Pierson Fodé, and Matthew Daddario. It had its world premiere at the Outfest Film Festival on July 17, 2015.

== Plot ==
Naomi and Ely have been best friends and neighbors in the same apartment building in New York City for years. Ely is gay, often having casual hook-ups with other guys, while Naomi is heterosexual and has recently begun dating "Bruce 2," although she has always been secretly in love with Ely.

Naomi and Ely have a "No Kiss List" where the guys on the list are forbidden to them both. In the beginning of the film, they add Gabriel, their young and handsome doorman, to the list. Everything is going well until Ely isn't always available when Naomi needs him. She has been struggling to help her mother recover from her father leaving after having an affair. Furthermore, Naomi has always fantasized about him falling in love with and marrying her one day.

Frustrated about the hopelessness of the situation, she lashes out at Ely's promiscuity. He replies that Naomi, who is still a virgin, is just taking her sexual frustration out on him.

One night, Naomi brings Ely along on a date with Bruce 2. After a fun night out, Naomi wants to go home but Ely pushes her to go home with Bruce to have sex, which she reluctantly agrees. They awkwardly make out in Bruce's dorm room until they are accidentally interrupted. A few days later, Ely discovers Bruce 2 waiting for Naomi in the hallway and offers him a drink while he waits. In Ely's bedroom, Bruce discovers his X-Men comics and they start bonding. They kiss spontaneously, but Ely immediately regrets it and apologizes.

While Naomi and Ely are shopping for Halloween costumes the next day, Ely confesses the kiss but Naomi brushes it off. She then discovers a mixtape in her mail from an admirer. While they are getting ready for the Halloween party, Bruce visits Ely, admitting he enjoyed their kiss and wants to pursue it further. Naomi arrives and Ely quickly hides Bruce in the closet while he hastens her out. He then goes back claiming he "forgot" something to tell Bruce to wait for him. Bruce agrees and gives him Orbit gum, to add to the alibi that he forgot something. Naomi remembers that Bruce 2 chews sugar free gum and Ely doesn't. She then figures out that Bruce 2 is in Ely's apartment and it wasn't just a kiss.

This results in a feud between them. She confides in her friend Robin, admitting she is more upset about Ely's betrayal than Bruce's. She then creates a list of things and places for Ely to avoid in order for them to stay away from each other. Ely breaks one of her requests, which results in another messy dispute. Naomi realizes that her dream to be with Ely will never come true.

During their time apart, Naomi grows closer to Robin and discovers that the mixtape was from Gabriel, who admits he's had a crush on her since they'd met. They slowly start a relationship and Naomi applies for a job to help her mother. She also convinces her mother to let go of her father, just as she is letting go of Ely. Naomi admits that although her life is better, she still misses her best friend and reaches out to Ely. They reconcile, Naomi finally accepting his sexuality. Ely, meanwhile, is settling down with Bruce 2. The film ends with Naomi stating that relationships and friendships are different kinds of love, but are still love and therefore, can have the same effects. She then says that everyone can have more than one special person in their life.

== Cast ==
- Victoria Justice as Naomi Mills
- Pierson Fodé as Ely Diamond
- Matthew Daddario as Gabriel
- Ryan Ward as Bruce II
- Griffin Newman as Bruce I
- Monique Coleman as Girl Robin
- Daniel Flaherty as Boy Robin
- Gary Betsworth as Mr. McAllister
- Dean Kapica as George
- Marianne Hagan as Mom Susan
- Maddie Corman as Mom Ginny
- Petronia Paley as Mrs. Loy
- Kathy Tong as Cassandra
- Cliff Samara as Mahmood
- Roger Yeh as Generally Geeky Guy
- Olamide Faison as Otis the Singer

== Release ==
The film had its world premiere at the Outfest LGBT Film Festival on July 17, 2015. The film was released on September 18, 2015, through video on demand.

== Post-release ==
In a 2016 interview, Victoria Justice stated that "...the film is a drama, to say the least. There is no true plot to the film and I feel like after the movie ended, Ely and Naomi got an apartment together and finally lived their true happy endings."

== See also ==
- List of lesbian, gay, bisexual or transgender-related films of 2015
