= Big Bear (film) =

2017 American film directed by Joey Kern

- Promotional release poster
- Directed by: Joey Kern
- Written by: Joey Kern
- Produced by: Brandon Evans; Brett Forbes; Joey Kern; Patrick Rizzotti
- Starring: Pablo Schreiber; Adam Brody; Ahna O'Reilly; Tyler Labine; Zachary Knighton; Joey Kern
- Cinematography: Timothy A. Burton
- Edited by: Franklin Peterson
- Music by: Anton Sanko
- Production companies: MTY Productions; Fortress Features
- Distributed by: Blue Fox Entertainment
- Release date: September 22, 2017 (U.S.)
- Running time: 88 minutes
- Country: United States
- Language: English
- Budget: $3.5 million

Big Bear is a 2017 American comedy film directed, produced, written and starring Joey Kern, also starring Pablo Schreiber, Adam Brody, Ahna O'Reilly, Tyler Labine and Zachary Knighton.

== Plot ==
When Joe shows up for his bachelor party that his friends, Eric, Nick and Colin, have thrown for him, he has to tell them that his fiancé, Jess, broke up with him the night before as she's in love with someone else. They encourage him to stay and party anyway to help cheer him up. The next morning after a long night of drinking, Eric shows them that he has kidnapped the guy Jess left Joe for, "Dude". He is tied and bound to a chair in the basement of the cabin they are staying and Joe debates whether to let him go or scare him into leaving Jess.

== Cast ==
- Pablo Schreiber as Dude
- Adam Brody as Eric
- Ahna O'Reilly as Jess
- Toby Huss as Cop
- Tyler Labine as Nick
- Zachary Knighton as Colin
- Joey Kern as Joe
- Patricia Rae as Waitress
- Heidi Heaslet as Susan

== Production ==
The film is Joey Kern's directorial debut, which he also wrote and produced the film with MTY Productions President Brandon Evans, Brett Forbes and Patrick Rizzotti of Fortress Features and Luke Edwards.
