= Matthew Daddario =

American actor (born 1987)

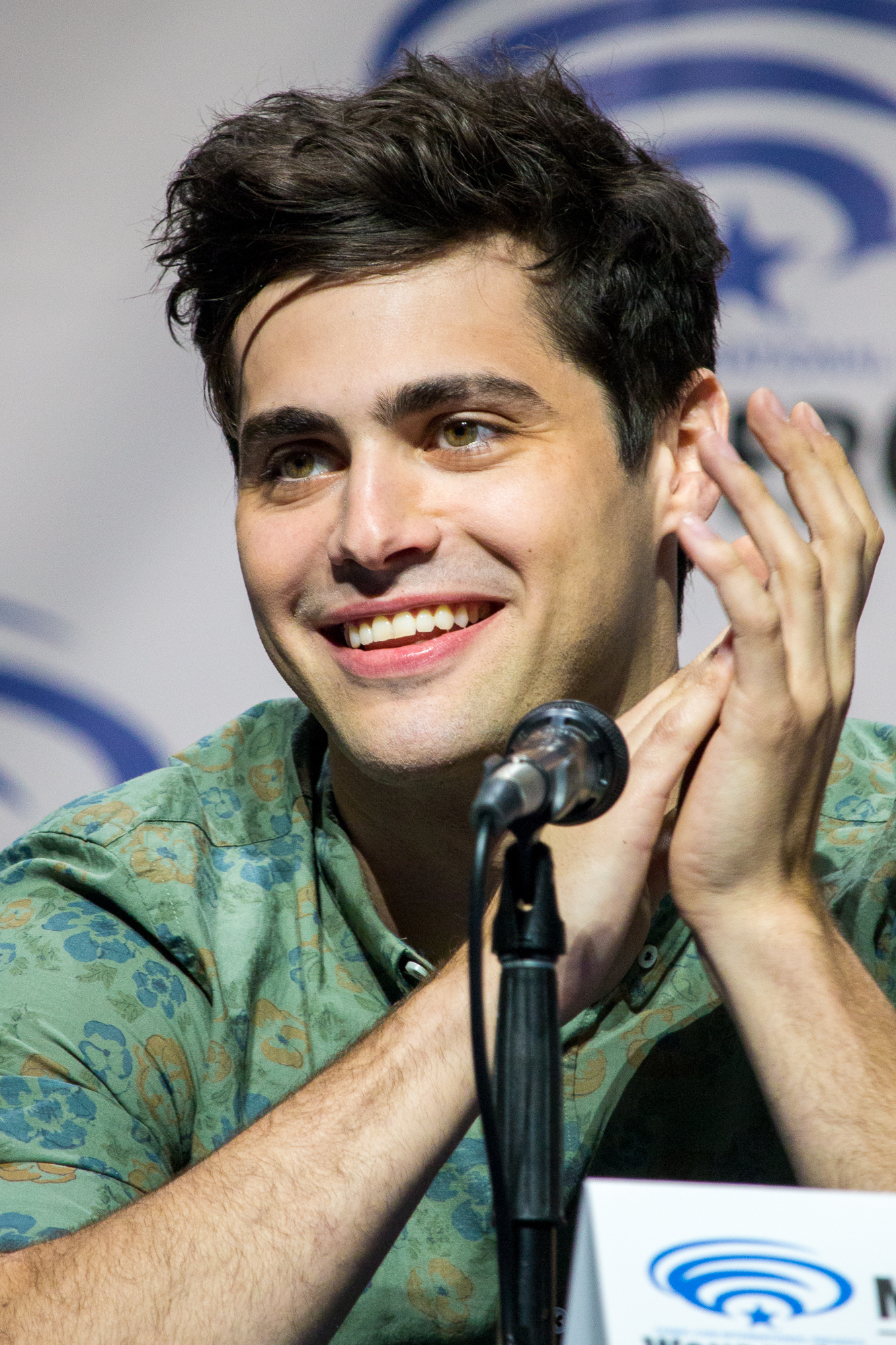
- Daddario in 2016
- Born: Matthew Quincy Daddario; October 1, 1987 (age 39); New York City, U.S.
- Education: Indiana University Bloomington
- Occupation: Actor
- Years active: 2012–present
- Spouse: Esther Kim (m. 2017)
- Children: 2
- Relatives: Alexandra Daddario (sister); Andrew Form (brother-in-law); Emilio Daddario (grandfather)

Matthew Quincy Daddario (born October 1, 1987) is an American actor. He gained recognition for his role as Alec Lightwood in the television series Shadowhunters (2016–2019).

== Early life ==
Daddario was born and raised in New York City, the son of Christina Daddario, a lawyer, and Richard Daddario, a prosecutor and former head of NYPD Counterterrorism under Mayor Michael Bloomberg. His older sister is actress Alexandra Daddario.

Daddario's paternal grandfather was Emilio Daddario, a Democratic representative to the United States House of Representatives for the state of Connecticut from 1959 to 1971. He is of Italian, English, Irish, and Slovak ancestry. Daddario attended the Collegiate School, before graduating with a degree in economics from Indiana University Bloomington in 2010.

== Career ==
Daddario made his major film debut as Aaron in the romantic drama film Breathe In, which was directed by Drake Doremus. In the same year he had a supporting role as Channing in the Vince Vaughn-led comedy film Delivery Man, directed by Ken Scott. In 2014, Daddario portrayed Danny Ladouceur in the sports drama film When the Game Stands Tall, co-starring alongside Jim Caviezel, Laura Dern, and Alexander Ludwig. The film is based on the achievements of football coach Bob Ladouceur and the De La Salle Spartans, who set a record 151-game winning streak.

In 2015, he co-starred as Gabriel in the teen comedy-drama Naomi and Ely's No Kiss List. In May 2015, it was announced that Daddario would portray Alec Lightwood on the Freeform fantasy series Shadowhunters, based on The Mortal Instruments series of novels by Cassandra Clare. He received a variety of nominations including Teen Choice Awards and GLAAD awards for his performance in the series. The show began airing on January 12, 2016 and ended on May 6, 2019. Also in 2016, he starred in the remake of Eli Roth's horror film Cabin Fever which was directed by Travis Z. In 2020, he joined the cast of Why Women Kill for the show's second season. He portrayed Scooter, a wannabe actor described as "charming but not so bright."

== Personal life ==
Daddario married Esther Kim on December 31, 2017. They have two children, the first of which was born in 2020. In February 2024, Kim revealed that they were expecting their second child and gave birth later in 2024.

== Filmography ==
=== Film ===
Year	Title	Role	Notes
2012	The Debut	Peter Hamble	
2013	Breathe In	Aaron	
2013	36 Saints	Sebastian	
2013	Delivery Man	Channing	
2014	When the Game Stands Tall	Danny Ladouceur	
2015	Growing Up and Other Lies	Peter	
2015	Naomi and Ely's No Kiss List	Gabriel	
2016	Cabin Fever	Jeff	
2016	The Last Hunt	Matthias	Short film; also director and executive producer
2021	Trust	Owen	
2021	Wild Game	Donny	
2022	Into the Deep	Ben	
2022	Dance Dads	Dom Feliciani	released direct to streaming video. Also Co-executive Producer.
2024	Party People	Marty	
2025	The Italians	Nico	

=== Television ===
Year	Title	Role	Notes
2016–2019	Shadowhunters	Alec Lightwood	Main role
2020	Tommy	Blaine	Episode: "To Take a Hostage"
2021	Why Women Kill	Scooter	Main role (season 2)
2023	Blue Bloods	John DiPierro	Episode: "Family Matters"
2024	Sister Wife Murder	Caleb	Television film
2025	Holiday Touchdown: A Bills Love Story	Gabe DeLuca	Television film
2026	Second Chance Holiday	Matty Hall	Television film

== Awards and nominations ==
Year	Nominated work	Award	Category	Result	Ref
2016	Shadowhunters	Teen Choice Awards	Choice TV: Breakout Star	Won	
2016	Shadowhunters	MTV Fandom Awards	Ship of the Year (shared with Harry Shum Jr.)	Nominated	
2017	Shadowhunters	Teen Choice Awards	Choice TV: Sci-Fi/Fantasy Actor	Nominated	
2017	Shadowhunters	Teen Choice Awards	Choice TV: Ship (shared with Harry Shum Jr.)	Nominated	
2017	Shadowhunters	Teen Choice Awards	Choice TV: Liplock (shared with Harry Shum Jr.)	Nominated	
2018	Shadowhunters	Teen Choice Awards	Choice TV: Sci-Fi/Fantasy Actor	Won	
2018	Shadowhunters	Teen Choice Awards	Choice TV: Ship (shared with Harry Shum Jr.)	Nominated	
