= Cabin Boy (disambiguation) =

Cabin Boy is a 1994 fantasy comedy film directed by Adam Resnick.

Cabin Boy may also refer to:

- Cabin boy, a servant on a ship
- "Cabin Boy", a 1951 science fiction story by Damon Knight
- "Cabin Boy", a 1984 song by Tom Robinson from Hope and Glory
