= Giuseppe Makes a Movie =

- Film poster
- Directed by: Adam Rifkin
- Produced by: Adam Rifkin; Mike Plante
- Edited by: David Nordstrom
- Music by: Giuseppe Andrews
- Distributed by: Cinelicious Pics
- Release dates: April 16, 2014 (Hot Docs); January 15, 2015
- Running time: 82 minutes
- Country: United States
- Language: English

Giuseppe Makes a Movie is a 2014 documentary film created by Adam Rifkin about the micro-budget films of actor/director Giuseppe Andrews.
