= Cabin Fever 2: Spring Fever =

2009 film by Ti West

- DVD cover
- Directed by: Ti West
- Screenplay by: Joshua Malkin
- Story by: Randy Pearlstein; Ti West
- Produced by: Lauren Moews; Patrick Durham; Jonathan Sachar
- Starring: Noah Segan; Alexi Wasser; Rusty Kelley; Marc Senter; Giuseppe Andrews
- Cinematography: Eliot Rockett
- Edited by: Janice Hampton
- Music by: Ryan Shore
- Production companies: Tonic Films; Morningstar Films; Aloe Entertainment; Proud Mary Entertainment; Tunnel Inc; Deerpath Films
- Distributed by: Lionsgate
- Release dates: September 23, 2009 (Fantastic Fest); February 16, 2010 (United States)
- Running time: 86 minutes
- Country: United States
- Language: English

Cabin Fever 2: Spring Fever (also known simply as Cabin Fever 2) is a 2009 American comedy horror film directed by Ti West. It is a sequel to the 2002 film Cabin Fever and the second installment in the Cabin Fever franchise. The film stars Noah Segan, Rusty Kelley, Alexi Wasser, Marc Senter, Rider Strong and Giuseppe Andrews, with Strong and Andrews reprising their roles from the first film. The film is about a high school prom that descends into chaos when a deadly flesh-eating disease spreads via a popular brand of bottled water.

== Plot ==
Some time after the events of the first film, a disfigured Paul escapes from the creek and makes it to the highway, only to be splattered by a school bus. Deputy Winston Olsen checks the remains and assures the shocked bus driver that he has hit a moose, then dumps the body near a creek. Paul's infected blood enters the creek and makes its way into a local bottled water company.

High school senior John is debating whether to go to prom with his long-time crush Cassie or stay home. His friend Alex is against going until he hooks up with a girl named Liz who drags him to the toilet where she gives him a blowjob. Alex notices a large yellowhead on her lip but thinks nothing of it. She says if she can get off work that night, she will meet him at the Prom. John's friends Darryl and Dane recommend that he watch a movie with them instead of going to prom. While walking Cassie home, John asks her to go to prom but she refuses.

Winston is at a restaurant and sees a worker from the bottled water company die and realizes the cause was Paul's body. He goes to the water plant to inform its operators, who are quickly killed by a group of soldiers in NBC suits. Winston leaves before they can get to him.

At the high school, where the infected bottles are distributed, the infection spreads, causing several deaths. Alex is disappointed that Liz did not come, while John gets into a fight with Cassie's boyfriend Marc. As the prom queen is named, the soldiers storm in and put the school under lockdown. As more students in the gym show signs of infection and die, the gym is gassed from the outside. Cassie, John, and Alex watch the carnage in horror. Winston is picked up by his cousin Herman, ready to leave town.

Alex discovers he is infected with necrotizing fasciitis and stays behind. John shows signs of the infection on his hand and has Cassie amputate his hand in the wood shop to stop it. Marc hits Cassie with a hammer and tries to kill John but Cassie kills him with a nail gun. The two leave the school only to be ambushed by the soldiers. John, weakened by loss of blood, stalls them, allowing Cassie to escape. She finds herself on the highway and flags down Herman's van. Winston and Herman take Cassie with them, not knowing she is also infected.

Meanwhile, Alex's date Liz is at her workplace. She is a stripper at Teazers and she spreads the infection to the customers, who in turn spread it further around the country and even to Mexico.

In a post-credits scene, Darryl and Dane are shown watching a movie and Dane says "prom blows".

== Cast ==
- Noah Segan as John
- Rusty Kelley as Alex
- Alexi Wasser as Cassie
- Giuseppe Andrews as Deputy Winston Olsen
- Regan Deal as Liz Grillington
- Marc Senter as Marc
- Michael Bowen as Principal Sinclair
- Lindsey Axelsson as Sandy
- Angela Oberer as Ms. Hawker
- Amanda Jelks as Frederica
- Judah Friedlander as Toby
- Taylor Kowalski as Darryl
- Alexander Thomas as Dane
- Patrick Durham as Banker Lucas
- Mark Borchardt as Herman
- Larry Fessenden as Bill
- Lisa H. Sackerman as Sores Girl / Prom Goer
- Michael Nesbitt as Custodian
- Rider Strong as Paul

== Production ==
The film was produced by Tonic Films, Morningstar Films, Carr Miller Entertainment, and Tunnel Post. The special effects are from Quantum Creation FX who created the make-up effects. Rider Strong and Giuseppe Andrews are the only two Cabin Fever cast members to come back for the sequel.

The film's production originally wrapped in April 2007.

After extensive re-editing and re-shooting by the producers, director Ti West requested to have his name removed from the film and replaced with the popular pseudonym Alan Smithee. Because he was not a member of the Directors Guild of America, his request was denied by the producers and he remains credited as the film's director. West has since disowned the final product claiming that it is more a product of the producers and executives than that of his own.

== Music ==
The film score was composed by Ryan Shore. The film also featured songs that of "Dancing On Our Graves" by the Washington-based band The Cave Singers, "Tonight Is Prom Night" by Gordean Simpson from the 1980 film Prom Night and "Inner Station" by Minimal Compact.

== Release ==
The film premiered on October 24, 2009, at the Mann Chinese 6 theaters in Hollywood, California as part of the 2009 Screamfest Horror Film Festival Los Angeles.

=== Home media ===
The film's theatrical release after its film festival run was ultimately skipped and was instead released Straight-to-DVD on February 16, 2010, in the United States. The DVD was also released in the UK on February 22. The DVD release for this film coincided with the Blu-ray disc release in the United States with the Unrated Directors Cut version of Eli Roth's first Cabin Fever film.
