= Amanda Jelks =

American actress (born 1986)

- Born: Amanda Renee Jelks; October 9, 1986 (age 39); Hammond, Louisiana, U.S.
- Occupation: actress

Amanda Renee Jelks (born October 9, 1986) is an American actress. She was born in Hammond, Louisiana to Rodney Jelks Sr. and Melissa Miller.

== Early life ==
Jelks was the second born child of Rodney Jelks Sr and Melissa Miller. Her father is of French and British descent and works as a linesman for Entergy. Her mother is of Scottish, English, and German descent and works as a registered nurse. She has three siblings and three step-siblings. Jelks started taking ballet lessons at the age of 2. When she was 10, she won the lead in a church play at Old Zion Hill Baptist in Tickfaw, Louisiana. She enjoyed it so much she started auditioning for roles in the Hammond Community Theater and won the lead in You Can't Take It With You. In 1998, she worked with Missoula's Children Theater as a singer and dancer for the production of Cinderella and The Pied Piper.

In 2005, she was awarded a scholarship to attend New Orleans Center for Creative Art NOCCA where she was trained in theater, dance, and voice. After graduating from Hammond High School, she attended the University of New Orleans, where she was a theater and education major. Hurricane Katrina flooded the university which resulted in UNO closing the theater department. Afterwards, she stayed in New Orleans for four months working as a personal assistant on Glory at Sea, which was directed by Benh Zeitlin.

== Career ==
Jelks' first feature film was as Frederika in Cabin Fever 2: Spring Fever. She has stated in interviews her inspirations are Kathy Bates and Melissa McCarthy because both women have opened the door for plus sized actresses to work in roles typically reserved for "normal sized" women.

In October 2011, she filmed a new drama, Untouched, which was released in 2017 on Amazon Prime. She was given a brief cameo in Scary Movie 5, which was released in theaters April 2013. She played a supporting role in the Stephen King miniseries Mr Mercedes.
