= Prom Night (soundtrack) =

Soundtrack album by Paul Zaza and Carl Zittrer
- Released: 1980
- Recorded: 1979
- Genre: Soundtrack; film score; disco
- Length: 37:16
- Label: RCA
- Producer: Paul Zaza; Carl Zittrer

Prom Night: Original Soundtrack from the Motion Picture is the soundtrack album of the 1980 Canadian-American slasher film Prom Night. It features the original musical score by Paul Zaza and Carl Zittrer, with contributions from Blue Bazar and Gordean Simpson. It was first officially released only in Japan in 1981. In 2019, it received two reissues on vinyl from Perseverance Records and 1984 Publishing.

== Background ==
The Prom Night soundtrack was composed by Paul Zaza and Carl Zittrer, with additional writing by Bill Crutchfield and James Powell. Director Lynch sought Zittrer after hearing his compositions in Black Christmas (1974). The soundtrack of Prom Night includes several disco songs which are featured prominently in the film's prom scene. Originally, the film was shot with the actors dancing to then-popular tracks by Gloria Gaynor ("I Will Survive"), Donna Summer, France Joli, Patrick Hernandez ("Born to Be Alive"), and Cheryl Lynn ("Star Love") among others, but according to Zaza, the publishing rights to the songs were far outside the film's budget.

Under orders from producer Peter Simpson, Zaza wrote a series of disco songs over a five-day period, closely copying the original tracks that were intended to be used in the film. This resulted in a copyright lawsuit for $10 million, which was eventually settled for $50,000.

== Release ==
The film's soundtrack was originally released only in Japan on LP and cassette in 1981. A 7-inch single of "All Is Gone" b/w "Forever" was also released; however, neither of these songs appears in the film. The soundtrack was likely not released in North America due in part to disco's sharply declining popularity in the United States by 1980. Many bootleg CD releases have also found their way onto the marketplace. Some of the music used in the film was later reused in Canadian horror productions also scored by Paul Zaza, such as Ghostkeeper (1981) and Curtains (1983).

=== Reissues ===
In May 2019, Perseverance Records released the first official and complete CD release of the Prom Night soundtrack. Perseverance worked closely with Carl Zittrer and Paul Zaza to locate and unearth the original masters and all music recorded for the film including unreleased disco songs and score not used in the final production, never heard before anywhere.

The same year, the independent 1984 Publishing issued a limited-edition 12-inch vinyl pressing of the full soundtrack cut at 45 rpm, with exclusive color variants.

== Track listing ==
All tracks are written by Paul Zaza and Carl Zittrer.

1980 Japanese release (RPL-8089)
No.	Title	Artist	Length
1.	"All Is Gone"	Blue Bazar	4:12
2.	"Prom Night"	Gordean Simpson (uncredited)	3:01
3.	"Changes"		4:19
4.	"Dancing in the Moonlight"		2:57
5.	"Fade to Black"	Gordean Simpson	3:12
6.	"All Is Gone" (Instrumental)	Blue Bazar	4:12
7.	"Time to Turn Around"		4:24
8.	"Love Me Till I Die"		3:11
9.	"Prom Night 2"		3:34
10.	"Forever"	Blue Bazar	4:14
Total length:			37:16

2019 Perseverance Records reissue (PRD 098)
No.	Title	Length
1.	"Opening"	3:12
2.	"Killer's Call List"	2:18
3.	"Tearing Up Yearbook"	1:00
4.	"Beach Flashback"	1:12
5.	"Prom Night Cello Theme"	1:48
6.	"Killer Tension"	1:11
7.	"Prom Night Suspense Theme"	1:18
8.	"Piano Theme"	1:32
9.	"Hallway Chase"	1:03
10.	"Haunting Robin"	2:53
11.	"Calm Before the Storm"	0:45
12.	"Caught in the Web"	0:25
13.	"Eerie"	1:20
14.	"Escape"	0:36
15.	"Hunted"	0:59
16.	"Lurking"	0:37
17.	"Quivering"	0:28
18.	"Trapped"	0:23
19.	"Who's There?"	0:42
20.	"Vertigo"	0:30
21.	"Waiting"	0:33
22.	"Mystery Build"	0:51
23.	"Dancin' in the Moonlight"	3:03
24.	"Love Me Till I Die"	3:10
25.	"Tonight Is Prom Night"	3:33
26.	"Changes"	4:15
27.	"Time to Turn Around"	4:20
28.	"Fade to Black"	3:12
29.	"Prom Night"	3:07
30.	"Disco Out the Back Door"	3:37
31.	"You Can Be What You Want to Be"	3:52
32.	"Another Disco Funk Track"	3:07
33.	"Funk Dat Disco"	2:44
34.	"Burnin' with Desire"	3:37
Total length:		66:21

== Sources ==
- Felsher, Michael (director) (2014). The Horrors of Hamilton High: The Making of Prom Night (documentary). Synapse Films/Red Shirt Pictures.
- Osborne, Jerry (2010). Movie/TV Soundtracks and Original Cast Recordings Price and Reference Guide. Osborne Enterprises. ISBN 978-0-932117-37-3.
