= Cabin, Shropshire =

Coordinates: 52.498°N 3.010°W

Cabin
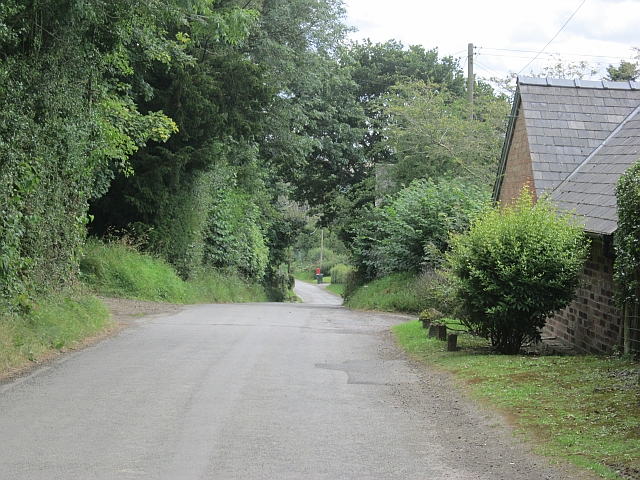
- Welsh Street, Cabin

- Location within Shropshire
- OS grid reference: SO314894
- Civil parish: Bishop's Castle
- Unitary authority: Shropshire
- Ceremonial county: Shropshire
- Region: West Midlands
- Country: England
- Sovereign state: United Kingdom
- Post town: BISHOPS CASTLE
- Postcode district: SY9
- Dialling code: 01588
- Police: West Mercia
- Fire: Shropshire
- Ambulance: West Midlands
- UK Parliament: Ludlow

Cabin is a village in Shropshire, England.
