= Arie Verveen =

Irish actor (born 1976)

- Born: 28 September 1976 (age 49); Ireland
- Occupation: Actor
- Website: arieverveen.com

Arie Verveen (born 28 September 1976) is an Irish actor. He has received an Independent Spirit Award Nomination (1997) and two Satellite Awards from the International Press Academy for his roles in the feature films Caught and The Thin Red Line.

== Biography ==
Verveen studied under acting coach David G. Bennett in London, where he made his stage debut in a production of A Hatful Of Rain by Michael V. Gazzo, which he co-produced and starred in. His appearance in Caught (1996) was his first lead role in a feature film, opposite Edward James Olmos and María Conchita Alonso, directed by Robert M. Young. This role garnered him a 1997 Special Achievement Satellite Award for Outstanding New Talent, an Independent Spirit Award nomination for Best Debut Performance, and critical acclaim for his work.

In 2010, Verveen appeared in season three of Sons of Anarchy as Liam O'Neill, a corrupt member of the Belfast charter of the Sons of Anarchy Motorcycle Club. Verveen has also worked with directors such as Terrence Malick (The Thin Red Line), Robert Rodriguez and Frank Miller (Sin City), Guy Ritchie (Suspect), Eli Roth (Cabin Fever), Sergei Bodrov (Running Free).

== Filmography ==
=== Film ===
Year	Title	Role	Notes
1995	Clouds of Magellan	Counsel	
1996	Caught	Nick	
1998	The Thin Red Line	Private Charlie Dale	
1999	Running Free	Adult Richard	
1999	Killers	Buddy	
2001	The Journeyman	Horace Marywell	
2002	Briar Patch	Flowers	
2002	Cabin Fever	Henry, The Hermit	
2003	Descendant	Edgar Allan Poe	
2003	Red Roses and Petrol	"Doc"	
2003	Sin	Marty Kraken	
2005	Sin City	Murphy	
2008	Boiler Maker	"Flex"	
2009	No Fury	Bobby	Direct-to-video
2009	Across the Hall	Lucas	
2012	Fire with Fire	Darren	
2014	Swelter	Reverend Joshua Stone	
2016	Saturday in the Park	Finton	
2016	Tao of Surfing	Pete	

=== Television ===
Year	Title	Role	Notes
2001	UC: Undercover	Marlon Chambers	Episode: "The Siege"
2003	The Handler	Paul	3 episodes
2006	Vanished	Aaron Hensleigh	2 episodes
2007	Suspect	Calvin McCall	Television film
2010	Cold Case	Cliff Harper	Episode: "Shattered"
2010–2011	Sons of Anarchy	Liam O'Neill	9 episodes

== Awards ==
- Satellite Award for Best New Talent 1997
