= Touch Me in the Morning (film) =

- DVD Cover
- Directed by: Giuseppe Andrews
- Written by: Giuseppe Andrews
- Produced by: Lloyd Kaufman; Michael Herz; Adam Rifkin
- Starring: Bill Nowlin; Giuseppe Andrews
- Edited by: Giuseppe Andrews
- Music by: Giuseppe Andrews
- Distributed by: Troma Entertainment
- Release date: 1999
- Running time: 80 minutes
- Language: English

Touch Me in the Morning is a 1999 independent film written and directed by Giuseppe Andrews. Andrews made the film with his friends and neighbors from the trailer park community he lives in, he has since made numerous films and shorts with this same group of people as his regular cast. In early 2006, Troma Entertainment released "Touch Me in the Morning" on DVD including other short films by Andrews and an interview with Andrews by Lloyd Kaufman.

The film is very gratuitous and is reminiscent of films such as Pink Flamingos and Gummo due to its collection of oddball characters and its blunt depiction of the grotesque living standards of its characters.

== Plot ==
Coney Island (Giuseppe Andrews) is a young trailer-park resident who spends his days cheering up the various characters in his neighborhood with songs that he writes and performs on his keyboard. After his dad comes home from prison, Coney Island turns to him for advice on love and life.
