= Joey Kern =

American actor and director (born 1976)

- Born: Joseph Daniel Kern; September 5, 1976 (age 49); Kentucky, U.S.
- Occupation: Actor
- Years active: 1997–present

Joseph Daniel Kern (born September 5, 1976) is an American actor and director. He is most widely known for his roles in the 2003 films Cabin Fever and Grind.

== Early life ==
Kern was born in Kentucky and was raised in northern Kentucky in the towns of Florence and Independence. In 1995, he graduated from St. Xavier High School in Cincinnati, and subsequently studied at New York University, earning his Bachelor of Fine Arts (BFA) in drama. While at NYU he studied at the Royal Academy of Dramatic Arts in London. He started acting on stage with various companies such as Atlantic Theater Company, New Group Theater and Theatre for a New Audience, where he played the title role of Troilus in Shakespeare's Troilus and Cressida directed by Sir Peter Hall.

== Career ==
His feature film debut came in 1999 with the film Die Jungfrau (The Virgin), an Austrian film shot in Austria, Greece and Egypt that cast Kern out of New York City. He had a guest appearance on the HBO series Sex and the City followed by a role in the Broken Lizard 2001 movie Super Troopers as one of the stoners. He had a few more roles in some indie films but his career picked up a little in 2002 with the movie Cabin Fever and then in 2003 when Grind was released. At one point, he had 5 movies in post-production, including The Sasquatch Gang (released in 2007), All the Days Before Tomorrow, and Just Add Water (2008).

In 2007, Kern co-hosted a week of Attack of the Show on G4. In 2010, he appeared in the TV movie, Playing with Guns, alongside Danny Masterson.

In 2016, Kern was cast in a recurring role on TNT's new drama series Good Behavior, starring Michelle Dockery, which ran two seasons. In 2017, Kern wrote, directed, and starred in Big Bear, which is based on his broken engagement to actress Ginnifer Goodwin.

== Personal life ==
He began dating Ginnifer Goodwin in April 2009. The couple announced their engagement December 24, 2010. They announced their break-up on May 20, 2011.

His brother is Broadway actor Kevin Kern.

== Filmography ==
=== Film ===
Year	Title	Role	Notes
2001	Super Troopers	College boy 2	
2002	Cabin Fever	Jeff	
2003	Grind	Sweet Lou	
2006	The Sasquatch Gang	Shirts	
2009	The Goods: Live Hard, Sell Hard	Ricky Big Ups!	
2012	Alter Egos	"C-Thru"	
2013	Beneath	Randy	
2015	Bloodsucking Bastards	Tim	
2017	Big Bear	Joe	Also director, writer and producer
2020	Useless Humans	Zachary	

=== Television ===
Year	Title	Role	Notes
2000	Sex & The City	Garth	1 episode, Boy, Girl, Boy, Girl
2006	Totally Awesome	Kipp Vanderhoff	Television movie
2008	The Middleman	Cecil Rogers	Episode: "The Cursed Tuba Contingency"
2008	Gaytown	Lance	Episode: "Small & Bald"
2008	Numb3rs	Kevin Warshaw	Episode: "Charlie Don't Surf"
2009	Celebrities Anonymous	Jake Williams	Television movie
2009	Ghosts/Aliens	Trey Hamburger	Television movie
2010	Party Down	Gem	Episode: "Party Down Company Picnic"
2012	Electric City	Frank Deetleman (voice)	Web series
2014	Workaholics	Todd	Episode: "Timechair"
2015	Bloodsucking Bastards	Tim	
2016–17	Good Behavior	Rob McDaniels	Series regular

== Stage ==
Year	Film	Role	Notes
1997	Mojo by Jez Butterworth	Silver Johnny	Atlantic Theater Company dir. Neil Pepe with Clark Gregg and Matt Ross
1998	The Fastest Clock in the Universe by Philip Ridley	Foxtrot Darling	The New Group dir. Jo Bonney
2001	Saved by Edward Bond	Mike	TFANA dir. Robert Woodruff with Amy Ryan and Norbert Leo Butz
2001	Troilus and Cressida by William Shakespeare	Troilus	TFANA dir. Sir Peter Hall with Idris Elba
2002	Spanish Girl by Hunt Holman	Bucky	Second Stage Theater dir. Erica Schmidt with Ari Graynor
