= Cabin Fever: Patient Zero =

2014 film by Kaare Andrews

- Theatrical release poster
- Directed by: Kaare Andrews
- Written by: Jake Wade Wall
- Produced by: Evan Astrowsky; Jaime Pina
- Starring: Ryan Donowho; Brando Eaton; Jillian Murray; Mitch Ryan; Lydia Hearst; Sean Astin
- Cinematography: Norm Li
- Edited by: Michael P. Mason
- Music by: Kevin Riepl
- Production companies: Indomina Group; Hypotenuse Pictures; Voltage Pictures
- Distributed by: Tiberius Film (Germany); Image Entertainment (US)
- Release dates: February 6, 2014 (Germany); August 1, 2014 (United States)
- Running time: 95 minutes
- Country: United States
- Language: English

Cabin Fever: Patient Zero is a 2014 American science fiction horror film directed by Kaare Andrews and written by Jake Wade Wall; it serves as a prequel to Cabin Fever, and the third installment of the Cabin Fever franchise. Starring Ryan Donowho, Brando Eaton, Jillian Murray, Mitch Ryan, Lydia Hearst and Sean Astin; the plot centers around a bachelor party on an isolated island, which inadvertently releases the disease from the previous two installments.

The film was theatrically released in Germany on February 6, 2014. It was released in the United States on June 26, 2014, on VOD and on August 1, 2014, in select theaters.

== Plot ==
At a secluded island laboratory run by the medical organisation CPEC, Dr. Edwards and fellow researchers Camila and Bridgett studies Mr. Porter, carrier of a deadly flesh-eating virus. Porter is asymptomatic and shows no signs of necrosis. For two months, Porter asks to see his wife Christina, his request is continually denied.

Marcus prepares to marry wealthy heiress Kate Arias in the Dominican Republic. Marcus's best friend Dobbs, his brother Josh, and Josh's girlfriend Penny charter a boat and take Mark to a supposedly unpopulated island for a bachelor party. On the way, Penny, Marcus's former flame, attempts to seduce him but is rebuffed.

Porter briefly warns a sympathetic Camila that he is dangerous. He attacks and infects Jorge, one of the researchers. Later, an outbreak occurs in the lab and Bridgett becomes infected.

Josh and Penny go snorkeling and see the decomposing carcasses of sea animals littering the ocean floor. When they return to camp, Josh and Penny discover strange rashes on their skin. While Josh performs oral sex on her, Penny begins spitting up large amounts of blood and her flesh starts melting. Josh radios for help and a voice claiming to be Dr. Edwards provides him with instructions.

Realizing that they need help but are stranded, Marcus and Dobbs search the island and find a bunker. Inside, the two friends discover research related to the virus. They also find mutated men who attempt to kill them. The two get away, but Dobbs becomes infected.

The bunker turns out to be connected to Dr. Edwards’ laboratory. Josh reunites with Marcus and Dobbs and they find the researchers. After formulating a plan for extraction, Bridgett and Josh split off to gather Penny and wait for the boat on the beach. Dobbs and Edwards also go on their own while Porter, Camila, and Marcus initiate the laboratory's self-destruct sequence.

Bridgett kills Josh and makes for the beach. Penny sees Bridgett trying to steal the dinghy and the two infected women fight to the death, dismembering each other in the process. Penny kills Bridgett, but succumbs to her illness and dies on the shore. Edwards also manages to kill Dobbs and escape to the beach with a rifle.

After rigging the lab to explode, Porter, Camila, and Marcus discover Dobbs’ and Josh's bodies and confront Dr. Edwards, who prepares to shoot Marcus. Porter, having been informed by Camila that his wife has been dead the entire time and Edwards has been lying to him, shoots and kills Edwards. Porter, Camila, and Marcus escape when the boat arrives.

On the boat, Porter gives Camila and Marcus each a bottled water to drink. Shortly thereafter, Camila and Marcus hear gun shots. They discover that Porter infected their water by injecting his blood into the bottles with a syringe before killing the boat captain and escaping in the dinghy. Camila and Marcus begin showing signs of infection.

Flashbacks reveal that it was Porter who lead Josh and the others to the bunker, using a radio he stole from Jorge to impersonate Edwards. Porter also infected a mouse, which led to the initial outbreak. The film ends with Porter heading to the mainland and the implication that he plans to spread the infection to the world.

== Cast ==
- Mitch Ryan as Marcus
- Ryan Donowho as Dobbs
- Brando Eaton as Josh
- Jillian Murray as Penny
- Currie Graham as Dr. Edwards
- Lydia Hearst as Bridgett
- Sean Astin as Porter
- Solly Duran as Camila
- Claudette Lali as Kate
- Juan "Papo" Bancalari as Mr. Arias
- Marie Michelle Bazile as Witch
- Roberto Linval as Jorge
- Magio Mojica as Captain Magio

== Music ==
=== Soundtrack ===
Cabin Fever: Patient Zero Original Motion Picture Soundtrack was released on July 22, 2014, under the record label Sumthing Else Music Works. The music was composed by Kevin Riepl, who has previously worked with Kaare Andrews on The ABCs of Death.

== Reception ==
=== Critical response ===
Cabin Fever: Patient Zero received mostly negative reviews from critics. Review aggregator website Rotten Tomatoes reported an approval rating of 20% based on 20 reviews, with an average rating of 4.20/10. On Metacritic, the film has a 28 out of 100 rating based on 11 critic reviews, indicating "generally unfavorable reviews".

Brian Tallerico of RogerEbert.com gave the film a score of 1.5/4 stars, describing the first act as being "so defiantly stupid that I imagine most who rent it or struggle through it in a theater won't care that there's actually some material in the final act that clicks, mostly due to some incredibly strong makeup work." Scott Foundas of Variety described the film as "thoroughly lousy" and wrote: "Characters reliably behave with the utmost stupidity, entering a quarantine zone with no hazmat suit and venturing alone into the woods, as they navigate the obligatory genre gauntlet of zombified corpses and poor cell-phone reception." Robert Abele of the Los Angeles Times called the film a "slack, dumb prequel", and wrote: "Director Kaare Andrews’ and screenwriter Jake Wade Wall's interminable set-up is hardly worth the uninspired rollout of the second half's carnage follies, which save the most debilitating anatomical shredding and pulverizing for two female characters, who square off ... for the benefit of misogynistic gore pervs everywhere." Ben Kenisberg of The New York Times wrote: "Less methodical and witty than its predecessors, Patient Zero often turns its infected characters into mindless, lurching zombies."

Rob Staeger of The Village Voice was more positive in his review, writing that the film "delivers its share of anticipated gross-outs, which director Kaare Andrews presents with a sly, often lipless, grin", and praised the makeup effects.

== Cancelled sequel ==
A fourth entry in the series, titled Cabin Fever: Outbreak, was planned to be filmed back-to-back with Cabin Fever: Patient Zero, but was scrapped.

== Remake ==
The remake of Cabin Fever was released in February 2016. Eli Roth, the writer and director of the original film, produced the remake.
