= Giuseppe Andrews =

American actor

- Born: Joey Murcia Jr. April 25, 1979 (age 47); Key Largo, Florida, U.S.
- Years active: 1989–2014

Joey Murcia Jr. (born April 25, 1979), known professionally as Giuseppe Andrews, is a former American actor, filmmaker, and musician. Known for directing and producing multiple avant-garde films, which commonly featured trailer parks and their residents, Andrews gained a cult following for his work before disappearing from the public eye in 2015.

Andrews began his career as a child actor, making his film debut in Getting It Right (1989). He had supporting roles in the films Independence Day (1996), American History X (1998), Pleasantville (1998), and Never Been Kissed (1999) before his breakout with a starring role in the teen comedy film Detroit Rock City (1999). Andrews also had a main role as Miles Novack on season 2 of the WB sitcom Nick Freno: Licensed Teacher (1997–1998). In the 2000s, Andrews had starring roles in the films Cabin Fever (2002), Neo Ned (2005), 2001 Maniacs (2005), Look (2007), and Cabin Fever 2: Spring Fever (2009). In the 2010s, he reprised his Look role in the Showtime television series of the same name.

After making his directorial debut with the independent film Touch Me in the Morning (1999), which he also starred in, Andrews directed over 50 films, many of which were classified as experimental films.

== Biography ==
Andrews was born Joey Murcia Jr. in Key Largo, Florida. His cinéma vérité-meets-exploitation filmmaking style has been compared to that of John Waters and Harmony Korine. He grew up in trailer parks, which feature prominently, along with their inhabitants, in many of his films. He also spent time living in a van with his father before they were both cast in an infomercial, which led to more acting jobs for Giuseppe.

Director Adam Rifkin has said of Andrews "Giuseppe Andrews is the most ferociously original filmmaker working in cinema today. No matter what new things he tries, everything is always signature Giuseppe Andrews. He is a true auteur." Rifkin also directed a documentary about Andrews, titled Giuseppe Makes a Movie.

Andrews reprised his role as a sheriff's deputy in the Cabin Fever sequel Cabin Fever 2: Spring Fever (2009).

== Filmography ==
=== Film ===
==== As actor ====
Year	Title	Role	Notes
1989	Getting It Right	Luke	Film debut; credited as Joey Andrews
1993	12:01	Kyle	Television film; credited as Joey Andrews
1994	Prehysteria! 2	Roughneck Leader	Credited as Joey Andrews
1995	Sleepstalker	Young Sandman	Credited as Joey Andrews
1995	White Dwarf	Never the Shifter / Doug	Television film; credited as Joey Andrews
1995	Unstrung Heroes	Ash	Credited as Joey Andrews
1996	Invisible Mom	Johnny Thomas	Credited as Joey Andrews
1996	Independence Day	Troy	
1998	American History X	Jason	
1998	Pleasantville	Howard	
1998	David and Lisa	Joey	Television film
1999	The Other Sister	Tough Guy Trevor	
1999	Never Been Kissed	Denominator	
1999	Detroit Rock City	Lex	
1999	Student Affairs	Dave	Television film
1999	Touch Me in the Morning	Coney Island	
2002	Local Boys	Willy	
2002	Cabin Fever	Deputy Winston	
2005	Neo Ned	Josh	
2005	Tweek City	Bill Jensen	
2005	2001 Maniacs	Harper Alexander	
2007	Homo Erectus	Zig	
2007	Look	Willie	
2007	Careless	Young Male Addict	
2009	Cabin Fever 2: Spring Fever	Deputy Winston	
2011	From the Head	Ramone	

==== As director ====
- Touch Me in the Morning (1999)
- In Our Garden (2002)
- Trailer Town (2003)
- Dad's Chicken (2003)
- Air Conditioning (2003)
- Wiggly Harris (2003)
- After School Specials (2003)
- Monkey (2004)
- Actor (2004)
- Babysitter (2004)
- The Date Movie (2004)
- Who Flung Poo? (2004)
- Dribble (2004)
- Tater Tots (2004)
- Period Piece (2004)
- 5th Wheel (2005)
- Gwank (2005)
- Grandpa (2005)
- Jacuzzi Rooms (2006)
- Ants (2006)
- Doily's Summer of Freak Occurrences (2006)
- Long Row to Hoe (2006)
- Cross Breeze (2006)
- Okie Dokie (2007)
- Garbanzo Gas (2007)
- Cat Piss (2007)
- Golden Embers (2007)
- Holiday Weekend (2007)
- Everlasting Pine (2007)
- Orzo (2008)
- It's All Not So Tragic (2008)
- Schoof (2008)
- Airplane Pillows (2008)
- The Check Out (2009)
- Esoterica (2009)
- Zoo Dung Zero (2009)
- The Fast (2010)
- Diary (2011)
- Love-Seat: A Portrait of Self (2011)
- Only the Music Tells Me Where to Go (2012)
- Pure Artisti Dal (2013)
- Sex Acid (2013)
- The Fire Dancers (2013)
- Closet Africa (2013)
- Birth of the Pool (2013)
- Tugboat (2013)
- Doll Bottle (2014)
- Homo Robot Paradise Slob (2014)
- Pregnant with a Swastika (2014)
- Japanese Confusion (2014)
- Coffee Cake (2014)
- Vagrant Womb (2014)
- Ninos (2014)
- Give Me Cinema or Give Me Death (2014)

=== Television ===
Year	Title	Role	Notes
1994	Beverly Hills, 90210	Cowboy	Episode: "Things That Go Bang in the Night"; credited as Joey Andrews
1997–1998	Nick Freno: Licensed Teacher	Miles Novack	Main role (season 2); 21 episodes
1999–2001	Two Guys, a Girl and a Pizza Place	Germ	Recurring role (seasons 3–4); 13 episodes
2002	Boston Public	Bobby Mendoza	Episode: "Chapter Thirty-Nine"
2006	The Minor Accomplishments of Jackie Woodman	Mike Ackerman	3 episodes
2008	CSI: Crime Scene Investigation	Joe	Episode: "Let It Bleed"
2010	Look	Willie	Main role; 3 episodes

== Discography ==
- Giants – self-released
- Night Owl Vol. 2 – self-released
- Night Owl Vol. 1 – self-released
- Race Cars – self-released
- Hobo Jungle – self-released
- Chow Mein Noodle CD (2003) – self-released
- Night Owl (2005) – self-released
- Me for All You (2006) – self-released
- Laroo (2006) – self-released
- Waiting Room (2007) – self-released
- Open Mic (2008) – self-released
- Reason (2009) – self-released
- Umami (2010) – self-released
- Stranger Than a Dream Vol 1 (2010) – self-released
- Stranger Than a Dream Vol 2 (2010) – self-released
- Sumami e.p. (2010) – self-released

Dates of some releases are unknown, albums are available to buy on his website and iTunes.
