= Backbone (Roam album) =

Studio album by Roam
- Released: 22 January 2016
- Studio: Steel City Studio, Sheffield; Futureworks Studios, Manchester; Mill Bank Farm Studios, East Sussex
- Genre: Pop punk
- Length: 35:11
- Label: Hopeless
- Producer: Drew Lawson

Roam chronology
Viewpoint (2015)	Backbone (2016)

Singles from Backbone
- 1. "Deadweight" Released: 11 October 2015; 2. "Hopeless Case" Released: 15 December 2015; 3. "Bloodline" Released: 15 January 2016

Backbone is the debut album by British pop punk band Roam.

== Production ==
Recording took place at Steel City Studio in Sheffield, Futureworks Studios in Manchester and Mill Bank Farm Studios in East Sussex. Drew Lawson produced the album. Phil Gornell engineered the proceedings with assistance from Grant Berry, Oliver Horner and Rian Dawson. Matt Wilson of Set Your Goals/Chains provides guest vocals on "Deadweight". Elliott Ingham performs additional drums. Lawson mixed the album, while Berry mastered it.

== Promotion ==
On 11 October 2015, a music video for "Deadweight" was released. On 13 December 2015, a music video for "Hopeless Case" was released. On 9 March 2016, a music video for "Tracks" was released.

== Release ==
The album was released on 22 January 2016 through Hopeless. The band is set to go on the 2016 Warped Tour. In April and May 2017, the band supported As It Is on their first US headlining tour.

== Critical reception ==
Professional ratings
Review scores
Source	Rating
Alternative Press	Favourable
idobi Radio	8/10 stars
Kerrang!	4/5
Rock Sound	7/10
Upset Magazine	3/5 stars

Backbone charted at number 178 in the UK.

== Track listing ==
All lyrics and music by Roam.

Backbone
No.	Title	Length
1.	"The Desmond Show"	0:27
2.	"Cabin Fever"	3:10
3.	"Deadweight"	3:04
4.	"All the Same"	2:21
5.	"Hopeless Case"	3:16
6.	"Bloodline"	3:06
7.	"R.I.P in Peace"	3:07
8.	"Tracks"	3:22
9.	"Head Rush"	3:19
10.	"Goodbyes"	2:32
11.	"Tell Me"	3:55
12.	"Leaving Notice"	3:32
Total length:		35:11

== Personnel ==
Personnel per sleeve.

Roam

- Alex Costello – lead vocals
- Alex Adam – vocals, lead guitar
- Sam Veness – rhythm guitar
- Matt Roskilly – bass
- Charlie Pearson – drums

Additional musicians

- Elliott Ingham – additional drums
- Matt Wilson (Set Your Goals/Chains) – guest vocals on "Deadweight"

Production

- Drew Lawson – producer, mixing
- Phil Gornell – engineer
- Grant Berry – assistant engineer, mastering
- Oliver Horner – assistant engineer
- Rian Dawson – assistant engineer
- Jordan Pryke – artwork
- Elliott Ingham – photographs

== Chart performance ==
Chart (2016)	Peak position
UK Albums Chart	178
