= Cabin Fever (2002 film) =

Film by Eli Roth

- Theatrical release poster
- Directed by: Eli Roth
- Written by: Eli Roth; Randy Pearlstein
- Story by: Eli Roth
- Produced by: Lauren Moews; Sam Froelich; Evan Astrowsky; Eli Roth
- Starring: Rider Strong; Jordan Ladd; James DeBello; Cerina Vincent; Joey Kern; Arie Verveen; Giuseppe Andrews
- Cinematography: Scott Kevan
- Edited by: Ryan Folsey
- Music by: Nathan Barr; Angelo Badalamenti
- Production companies: Deer Path Films; Cabin Films; Down Home Entertainment; Tonic Films; Black Sky Entertainment
- Distributed by: Lionsgate Films
- Release dates: September 14, 2002 (TIFF); September 12, 2003 (United States)
- Running time: 94 minutes
- Country: United States
- Language: English
- Budget: $1.5 million
- Box office: $30.6 million

Cabin Fever is a 2002 American comedy horror film, co-written and directed by Eli Roth in his directorial debut. It follows a group of college students who rent a cabin in the woods, where they unwittingly come in contact with an unknown flesh-eating disease. It stars Rider Strong, Jordan Ladd, James DeBello, Cerina Vincent, Joey Kern, and Giuseppe Andrews.

Roth was inspired to write the screenplay after developing a skin infection during a trip to Iceland. Principal photography of Cabin Fever took place in North Carolina in late 2001.

Cabin Fever premiered at the 2002 Toronto International Film Festival before being acquired by Lionsgate Films, who released it theatrically in the United States on September 12, 2003. The film was a sleeper hit, grossing over $30 million against a $1.5 million budget. The film was followed by several films in a franchise, including Cabin Fever 2: Spring Fever (2009) and Cabin Fever: Patient Zero (2014), as well as a remake in 2016.

== Plot ==
Henry, a hermit walking in the woods, encounters his dog, dead from a blood infection, and becomes infected himself from contact with his dog's blood.

College students Jeff, Marcy, Paul, Karen, and Bert take a vacation to a remote cabin to celebrate October break. Bert leaves to hunt squirrels but accidentally shoots the now disfigured and bloody Henry. Despite Henry's pleas for aid, Bert flees and remains silent about the incident.

As the friends gather around a campfire that night, they are joined by a friendly drifter named Grimm and his pet dog, Dr. Mambo. When it rains, Grimm leaves with his dog. While the friends wait for Grimm, Henry stumbles into their camp begging for help. When Bert shuts the door on the sick hermit, he tries to steal the group's car while vomiting blood. When Henry approaches Marcy and Karen, Paul accidentally sets him on fire.

The next day, while seeking help fixing their truck, Jeff and Bert encounter a butcher, but leave after learning that she is Henry's cousin. Paul calls police Deputy Winston, who promises to send up a tow truck. Paul tries comforting Karen, who is upset over Henry's death. After calming her down, Paul attempts to have sex with her, only to discover a bloody, infected wound on her thigh. The group isolates her in a shed.

After fixing the truck, Bert coughs up blood but hides it from the others and drives off after Paul and Jeff find out. Jeff takes the remaining beer and leaves, terrified of becoming infected. Bert seeks help at a convenience store but angers the owner after his disturbed son, Dennis, bites him. Bert flees, chased by Dennis's father and two friends. At the cabin, Marcy worries that they will all contract the disease. Paul comforts her and they impulsively have unprotected sex. Soon after he leaves the cabin to find Jeff, while Marcy takes a bath, crying. As she shaves her legs, the flesh begins to peel off and she runs outside in a panic, where she is mauled and eaten alive by Dr. Mambo.

Paul discovers Henry's body floating in the reservoir, and realizes that the infection is spreading through the water supply. Returning to the cabin, Paul finds Marcy's bloody remains and sees Dr. Mambo feeding on a weakened Karen, whose face has now become fully decayed by the infection. After killing the dog with Bert's gun, Paul bludgeons Karen to death with a shovel in a mercy killing.

A dying Bert returns to the cabin pursued by Dennis's father and his two companions. The posse kills Bert, and Paul kills all three of them. Paul looks for Jeff and instead finds Grimm's corpse in a cave. Paul takes the convenience store's truck, and, while driving, discovers that he is infected before hitting a deer. He reunites with Deputy Winston, who is partying with underage drinkers. Paul requests a ride to the hospital, but before the group departs, Winston is ordered to kill on sight several infected people on a killing spree.

Paul attacks but does not kill Winston. As he attempts to hitch a ride, he falls unconscious and gets picked up by a passing vehicle, whose occupants drop him off at a hospital. The doctors request Deputy Winston to transfer Paul to another medical facility.

The next day, Jeff, who has been hiding out and drinking in the woods, returns to the cabin. Initially crying after seeing the remains of his friends, he becomes ecstatic upon realizing that he survived. As he raises his arms in victory, he is killed by local police and his body burned with the remains of Bert and Karen. The sheriff asks Winston if he took care of Paul.

Two kids get water from the lake for their lemonade stand, not realizing that a barely alive Paul is in the lake and contaminating the water. The sheriff and his deputies stop by the convenience store, owned by the children's grandfather, where they buy glasses of lemonade.

== Cast ==
- Rider Strong as Paul
- Jordan Ladd as Karen
- James DeBello as Bert
- Cerina Vincent as Marcy
- Joey Kern as Jeff
- Arie Verveen as Henry, The Hermit
- Giuseppe Andrews as Deputy Winston
- Eli Roth as Justin / Grimm
- Adam Roth as The Happy Bald Guy
- Robert Harris as Old Man Cadwell
- Hal Courtney as Tommy
- Matthew Helms as Dennis
- Richard Boone as Fenster
- Tim Parati as Andy
- Rock (dog) as Dr. Mambo

== Production ==
=== Writing ===
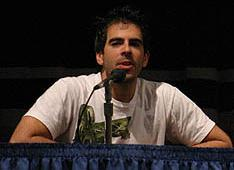
Director Eli Roth in 2007

Roth was inspired to write the script after getting an intense skin infection after working on a farm in Iceland. The original title for the film was "Flood" and the plot originally followed an infected member of a group of friends stuck in a cabin during a torrential rainstorm. Eli Roth showed the script to his friend and former NYU roommate Randy Pearlstein in 1995 while Roth was working as a production assistant for Howard Stern's Private Parts. Roth and Pearlstein would rework the script into Cabin Fever. Early attempts to sell the script were unsuccessful because studios felt that the horror genre had become unprofitable. In 1996, the film Scream was released to great success, leading studios to once again become interested in horror properties. Roth still could not sell his script, as studios told him that it should be more like Scream. Many potential financiers also found the film's content to be unsettling, including not only the gore but also the use of the racial slur "nigger" early in the film.

Various elements of the script were inspired by Roth's favorite horror films, including The Texas Chain Saw Massacre (1974), The Last House on the Left (1972), and The Evil Dead (1981). David Lynch, whom Roth had worked under during the early stages of his career, had signed on to executive produce the film. However, Lynch is not credited in the final product.

=== Casting ===
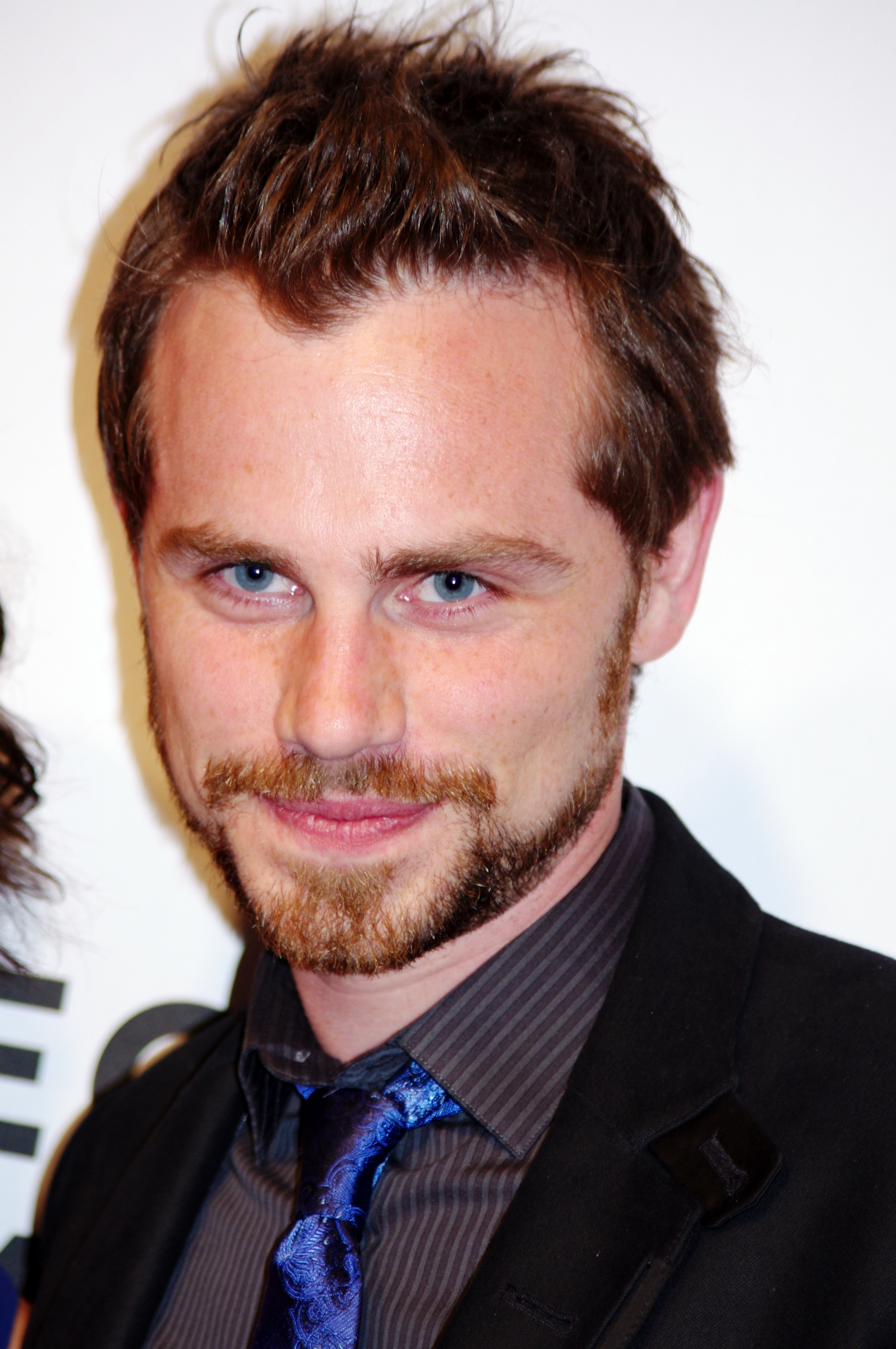
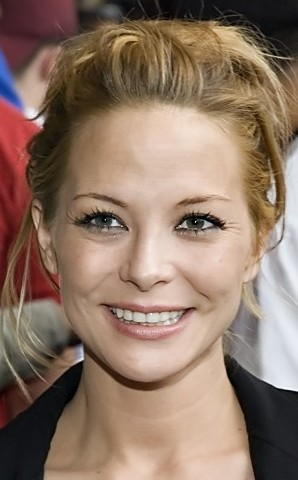
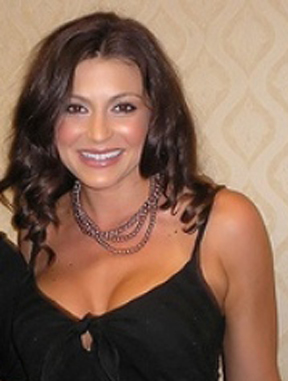
Top to bottom: Rider Strong, Jordan Ladd, and Cerina Vincent

The auditions for the character of Marcy had been scheduled to take place on September 11, 2001. The scene the producers had chosen for the auditioning actresses was the build-up to Marcy's sex scene with Paul. In the scene, Marcy is convinced that all the students are doomed and despite Paul's reassurances, she describes their situation as "like being on a plane, when you know it's gonna crash. Everybody around you is screaming 'We're Going Down! We're Going Down!' and all you want to do is grab the person next to you and fuck them, because you know you're going to be dead soon, anyway." Eli Roth and the producers tried to cancel the Marcy auditions, but the general chaos caused by the attacks made it impossible for them to reach many of the actresses who were scheduled to try out for the role. In October 2001, Jordan Ladd and James DeBello entered negotiations to join the film. Michael Rosenbaum was set to star in the film, but would later vacate the project.

=== Filming ===
Filming on Cabin Fever began in late 2001 and lasted 24 days, on location in North Carolina. Production was stalled after one day of filming due to an anthrax scare. According to Roth, filming was shut down a second time due to a union dispute. Cabin scenes were filmed at Catawba cabin, an isolated spot at Raven Knob Scout Reservation, near Mount Airy, North Carolina. Roth originally wanted Cerina Vincent to show her naked buttocks during her sex scene with Rider Strong. Vincent, who had previously played a nude foreign exchange student in Not Another Teen Movie (2001), was afraid that exposing too much of herself would lead to being typecast as a nudity actress and vehemently refused to bare her buttocks. At the peak of this conflict between the two, Vincent told Roth that if he wanted the shot so badly, he would need to re-cast the role with another actress. But they managed to reach a compromise, in which Vincent showed one inch of her buttocks on camera before Roth measured it for it to be precise. Bedsheets were then taped to her backside at the designated level and the scene was filmed.

== Music ==
Composer Angelo Badalamenti agreed to compose some musical themes for the film out of enthusiasm for the material. However, the bulk of the film's score was composed by Nathan Barr. Some of the music selected for the film was deliberately chosen by Roth for their connection to other horror films; in the opening scene for example, while the main characters are driving to the cabin, "The Road Leads to Nowhere", a song written and recorded for The Last House on the Left (1972), is playing on the radio.

== Release ==
=== Theatrical ===
The film premiered at the Midnight Madness section of the Toronto International Film Festival (TIFF) in September 2002 and was the festival's closing feature film. After a successful run at TIFF, the distribution rights to the film was sold to Lionsgate for $3.5 million.

=== Home media ===
Cabin Fever was released on VHS and DVD in March 2004, which includes audio commentary tracks with director Eli Roth and the main cast as well as a featurette entitled "Beneath the Skin", which provides a behind the scenes look on the film. The Blu-ray was released in February 2010, featuring Roth's edited version of the film that was screened at TIFF. The Blu-ray was created from the film's original camera negative overseen by Roth, and includes a brand-new audio commentary with Roth and the main cast as well as a gallery of rare behind the scenes photos.

On January 13, 2026, Lionsgate released a 4K UHD Blu-ray edition in a limited steelbook package through their official online store, as part of the Lionsgate Limited series.

== Reception ==
=== Box office ===
Cabin Fever was released in the United States on September 12, 2003; it landed at no. 3 during its opening weekend, grossing $8.3 million on 2,087 theaters (an average of $4,137 per screen). The film became a sleeper hit, ending its theatrical run with a gross of $21.2 million in the U.S. and Canada and $30.6 million worldwide, making it the highest-grossing film released by Lionsgate that year.

=== Critical response ===
Uproxx reported that Cabin Fever drew "better-than-average" reviews. Some critics complimented the performances from the leads as "solid" while others judged them merely "adequate". Their characters, however, were met with negative reactions: IGN and the Los Angeles Times' Manohla Dargis described them, respectively, as stereotypical and "monumentally irritating". Furthermore, IGN and Dargis criticized the film's lack of scares, delivering more jokes and gore. Stephen Holden of The New York Times and Peter Travers of Rolling Stone disagreed; Holden said Cabin Fever "finds an unusually potent blend of dread, gore and gallows humor", and Travers called it "a blast of good gory fun that just won't quit". Kim Newman in Empire and Maitland McDonagh in TV Guide awarded Cabin Fever three stars out of five.

Reviewers observed the film's homage to low-budget horror and thriller films, including Night of the Living Dead, Deliverance, The Texas Chain Saw Massacre, The Evil Dead and its sequel Evil Dead II, and The Blair Witch Project. IGN said Cabin Fever "struggles valiantly to be both a worthy addition and simultaneous homage to these genres ... becoming instead a passably enjoyable slab of schlock", criticizing its failure to reinvent the films that inspired Roth's. Conversely, Newman said: "There's a fine line between homage and simply stealing, but writer-director Eli Roth mostly manages the former". Stephen Hunter in The Washington Post said Cabin Fever compared poorly to The Evil Dead and The Blair Witch Project, describing it as "a loud, derivative grade-Z horror film of no particular distinction". McDonagh said Cabin Fever was "more Straw Dogs than Night of the Living Dead", citing its theme of "degeneration of relationships under pressure".

Some critics said Cabin Fever suffered from genre and tone inconsistencies, with Roger Ebert in the Chicago Sun-Times comparing the flaw to "kids on those arcade games where the target lights up and you have to stomp on it". Ebert was critical that the film alternates between horror and "weird humor", getting nowhere; he said it "could develop its plague story in a serious way, like a George Romero picture or 28 Days Later". Owen Gleiberman in Entertainment Weekly said, "Cabin Fever is what 28 Days Later would have looked like had it been made without style, subtlety, grunge-of-night video photography, or fashionable apocalyptic pretensions." Ebert gave Cabin Fever one-and-a-half stars out of four, and Gleiberman said it was "a big, dumb, crude, noisy, goose-the-audience bash and proud of it".

The review-aggregation website Rotten Tomatoes gives the film a score of 62% based on 140 reviews, with an average rating of 5.6/10. The website's consensus reads, "More gory than scary, Cabin Fever is satisfied with paying homage to genre conventions rather than reinventing them." On Metacritic, the film earned "mixed or average reviews," with a weighted average of 56 out of 100 based on 31 reviews. Peter Jackson, the director of The Lord of the Rings film series, was a notable fan of Cabin Fever. Having seen the film from a print sent to him, Jackson suspended production on The Return of the King twice in his native New Zealand to have it screened to his cast and crew members. He complimented the film as "unrelenting, gruesomely funny bloodbath". Quentin Tarantino also expressed his admiration for Cabin Fever, calling Roth "the future of horror".

== Franchise ==
=== Sequel ===
Roth revealed in a 2010 interview that he had written a treatment for the sequel to Cabin Fever as part of Lionsgate's distribution deal, pitching it as "a Song of the South horror movie filled with corpses and sex." Since Lionsgate was unwilling to produce his idea, Roth entrusted Ti West to direct the sequel entirely from West's own version. Cabin Fever 2: Spring Fever was released in 2009.

=== Prequel ===
A prequel to the two previous films, Cabin Fever: Patient Zero, was directed by Kaare Andrews in 2014.

=== Remake ===
A remake of the original, also titled Cabin Fever, was subsequently announced that same year, with Roth staying on as executive producer. Travis Zariwny directed the film using Cabin Fever's original screenplay co-written by Roth. Despite being panned by critics upon its 2016 release, with critics calling it "pointless" and derivative, Roth said he was genuinely happy with the remake.

== Sources ==
- Tompkins, Joe (2009). "Pop Goes the Horror Scene: Left Alone in The Last House on the Left". In Lerner, Neil (ed.). Music in the Horror Film: Listening to Fear. New York City, New York: Routledge. ISBN 978-1-135-28044-4.
- Piatti-Farrell, Lorna (2017). Consuming Gothic: Food and Horror in Film. New York City, New York: Springer. ISBN 978-1-137-45051-7.
- Reyes, Xavier Aldana (2014). Body Gothic: Corporeal Transgression in Contemporary Literature and Horror Film. Cardiff, Wales: University of Wales Press. ISBN 978-1-783-16092-1.
