= That's Amore (disambiguation) =

"That's Amore" is a 1953 hit song.

That's Amore may also refer to:

- That's Amore! (film), an upcoming American musical romantic comedy film
- That's Amore (game show), a short-lived 1992-1993 American adaptation of Italian program C'eravamo tanto amati (We Loved Each Other So Much)
- That's Amore! (TV series), a short-lived 2008 spinoff of MTV reality dating show A Shot at Love with Tila Tequila
- "That's Amore" (The White Lotus), a 2022 TV episode

== See also ==
- That's Amore Italian Cafe
- "That's Amorte", a 2023 episode of Rick and Morty
- "That's Not Amore!", a 2022 episode of Summer House
