= Gregory Joujon-Roche =

American actor

Greg Joujon-Roche
- Born: Gregory Metcalfe Joujon-Roche; December 7, 1966; California, U.S.
- Died: July 31, 2016 (aged 49); Los Angeles, California, U.S.
- Occupations: Personal trainer, author
- Spouse: Irma Joujon-Roche
- Children: 2

Gregory Metcalfe Joujon-Roche (/ˈʒuːˌʒɒn ˈroʊʃ/; December 7, 1966 – July 31, 2016) was an American personal trainer and author who founded Holistic Fitness in Los Angeles in 1994.

== Career ==
Joujon-Roche was born in Los Angeles, California and raised in Kauai, Hawaii. He later moved back to Los Angeles where he worked as a model and appeared in the 1989 direct-to-video horror film, Psycho Cop. In the early 90s, Joujon-Roche began working as a personal trainer and, in 1994, opened Holistic Fitness. His first celebrity client was actress Demi Moore who hired Joujon-Roche to get her into shape for the 1996 film Striptease. He went on to train other celebrities including actors Brad Pitt (for the 2004 film Troy), Tobey Maguire (for 2002's Spider-Man) and Leonardo DiCaprio, singers Gwen Stefani and Pink and supermodel Gisele Bündchen. He wrote a fitness book One Body, One Life : Six Weeks to the New You, released in April 2006. The following year, Joujon-Roche opened Real Raw Live, a juice bar, in Los Angeles.

In 2014, Joujon-Roche, his wife Irma and their two children relocated to Sydney, Australia where he opened a second Real Raw Live juice bar.

== Death ==
On July 31, 2016, Joujon-Roche died of cholangiocarcinoma in Los Angeles at the age of 49.
