= Rudolf Nureyev =

Soviet-born ballet dancer (1938–1993)

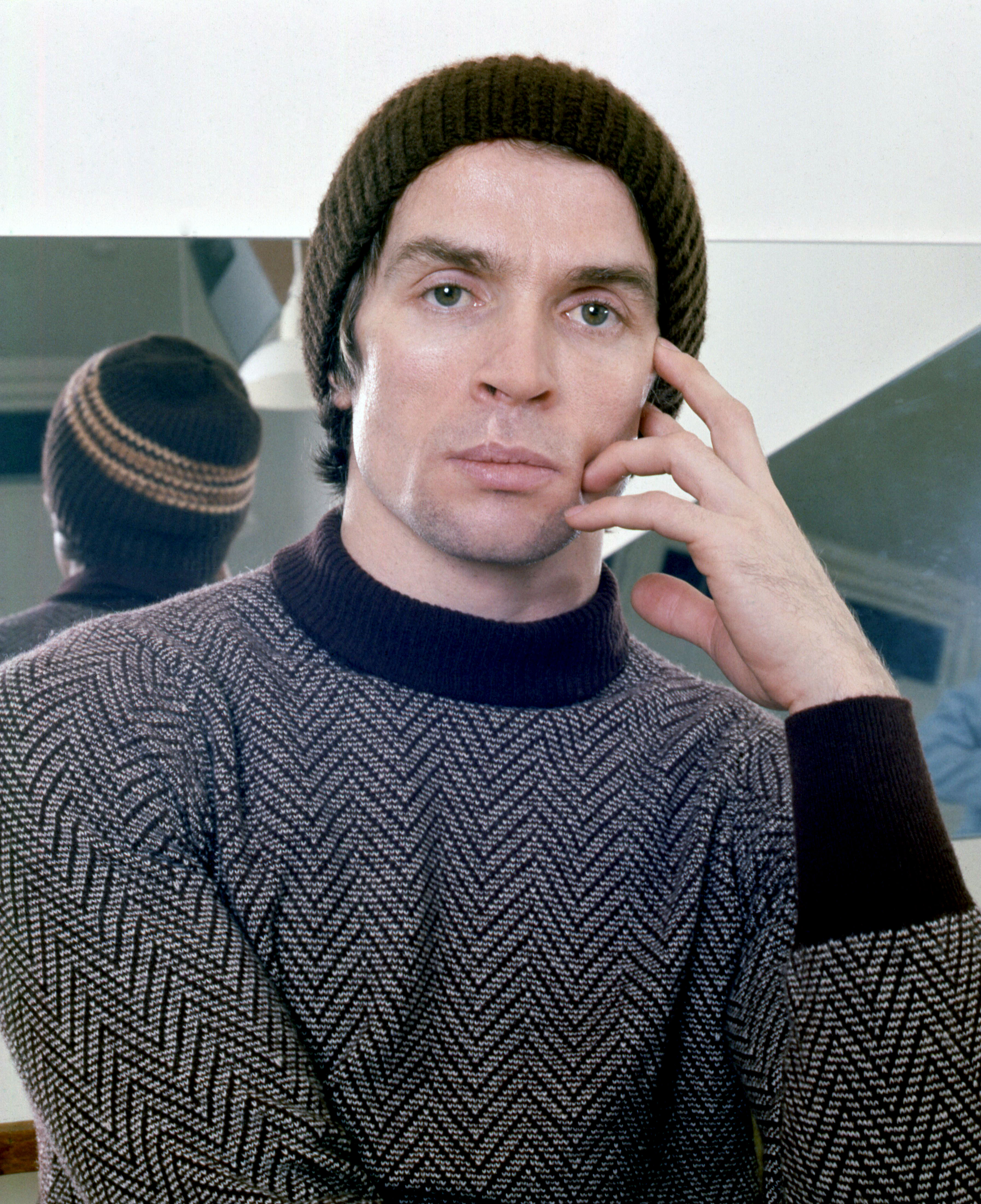
- Nureyev in 1973
- Born: Rudolf Khametovich Nureyev; 17 March 1938; Near Lake Baikal, Russian SFSR, USSR
- Died: 6 January 1993 (aged 54); Levallois-Perret, France
- Cause of death: AIDS-related complications
- Resting place: Sainte-Geneviève-des-Bois Cemetery, Paris, France
- Citizenship: Soviet Union (until 1961); Stateless (1961–1982); Austria (from 1982)
- Education: Kirov Ballet School
- Occupations: Dancer; choreographer; ballet director
- Years active: 1958–1992
- Height: 173 cm (5 ft 8 in)
- Partners: Erik Bruhn (1961–1966); Wallace Potts (1969–1975); Robert Tracy (1979–1992)
- Website: nureyev.org

Rudolf Khametovich Nureyev (Note: In this name that follows East Slavic naming customs, the patronymic is Khametovich and the family name is Nureyev.) (Note: /ˈnjʊəriɛf, njʊˈreɪɛf/ NURE-ee-ef, nyuurr-AY-ef; Russian: Рудольф Хаметович Нуреев [rʊˈdolʲf xɐˈmʲetəvʲɪtɕ nʊˈrʲejɪf]; Tatar: Rudolf Xämit ulı Nuriev; Bashkir: Рудольф Хәмит улы Нуриев.) (17 March 1938 – 6 January 1993) was a Soviet-born ballet dancer and choreographer. Nureyev is widely regarded as the preeminent male ballet dancer of the 20th century, as well as one of the greatest ballet dancers of all time. (Note: Attributed to multiple sources.)

Nureyev was born on a Trans-Siberian train near Lake Baikal, in Siberia, Soviet Union. He began his career in Leningrad with the company that in the Soviet era was called the Kirov Ballet. In 1961, he defected to the West, despite KGB efforts to stop him. This was the first defection of a Soviet artist during the Cold War, and it created an international sensation.

He went on to dance with The Royal Ballet in London and became a global star. Known for his charisma, technical brilliance, and intense stage presence, Nureyev helped elevate the role of the male dancer in ballet. From 1983 to 1989, he directed the Paris Opera Ballet and became its chief choreographer. He also produced his own interpretations of numerous classical works, including Swan Lake, Giselle, and La Bayadère.

== Early life and education ==
Nureyev's grandfather, Nurakhmet Fazlievich Fazliev, and his father, Khamit Fazleevich Nureyev (1903–1985), were from Asanovo in the Sharipov volost of the Ufa District of the Ufa Governorate (now the Ufa District of the Republic of Bashkortostan). His mother, Farida Agliullovna Nureyeva (Agliullova) (1907–1987), was born in the village of Tatarskoye Tyugulbaevo, Kuznechikhinsky volost, Kazan Governorate (now Alkeyevsky District of the Republic of Tatarstan).

Nureyev was born on a Trans-Siberian train near Lake Baikal, in Siberia, while his mother Farida was travelling to Vladivostok, where his father Khamet, a Red Army political commissar, was stationed. He was raised as the only son with three older sisters in a Tatar Muslim family. In his autobiography, Nureyev noted about his Tatar heritage: "My mother was born in the beautiful ancient city of Kazan. We are Muslims. Father was born in a small village near Ufa, the capital of the Republic of Bashkiria. Thus, on both sides our relatives are Tatars and Bashkirs. I cannot define exactly what it means to me to be a Tatar, and not a Russian, but I feel this difference in myself. Our Tatar blood flows somehow faster and is always ready to boil".

=== Education at Vaganova Academy ===
When his mother took Nureyev and his sisters to a performance of the ballet Song of the Cranes, he fell in love with dance. As a child, he was encouraged to dance in Bashkir folk performances and his precocity was soon noticed by teachers who encouraged him to train in Leningrad (now Saint Petersburg). On a tour stop in Moscow with a local ballet company, Nureyev auditioned for the Bolshoi ballet company and was accepted. However, he felt that the Mariinsky Ballet school was the best, so he left the local touring company and bought a ticket to Leningrad.

Owing to the disruption of Soviet cultural life caused by World War II, Nureyev was unable to enroll in a major ballet school until 1955, aged 17, when he was accepted by the Vaganova Academy of Russian Ballet of Leningrad, the associate school of the Mariinsky Ballet. The ballet master Alexander Ivanovich Pushkin took an interest in him professionally and allowed Nureyev to live with him and his wife.

== Career ==
=== The Kirov Ballet ===
Upon his graduation in 1958, Nureyev joined the Kirov Ballet (now Mariinsky). He moved immediately beyond the corps level, and was given solo roles as a principal dancer from the outset. Nureyev regularly partnered with Natalia Dudinskaya, the company's senior ballerina and wife of its director, Konstantin Sergeyev. Dudinskaya, who was 26 years his senior, first chose him as her partner in the ballet Laurencia.

Before long, Nureyev became one of the Soviet Union's best-known dancers. From 1958 to 1961, in his three years with the Kirov, he danced 15 roles, usually opposite his partner, Ninel Kurgapkina, with whom he was very well paired, although she was almost a decade older than he was. Nureyev and Kurgapkina were invited to dance at a gathering at Khrushchev's dacha, and in 1959 they were allowed to travel outside the Soviet Union, dancing in Vienna at the International Youth Festival. Not long after, he was told by the Ministry of Culture that he would not be allowed to go abroad again. In one memorable incident, Nureyev interrupted a performance of Don Quixote for 40 minutes, insisting on dancing in tights and not in the customary trousers. He relented in the end, but his preferred dress code was adopted in later performances.

=== Defection from the Soviet Union ===
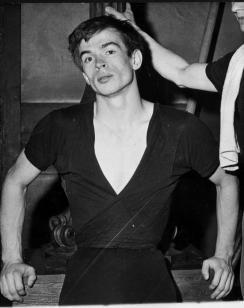
Rudolf Nureyev after his defection from the Soviet Union in 1961.

By the late 1950s, Nureyev had become a sensation in the Soviet Union. Though Nureyev's rebellious character and non-conformist attitude made him an unlikely candidate for the tour with the Kirov Ballet, it became more essential he join the tour which the Soviet government considered crucial to its ambitions to demonstrate its "cultural supremacy" over the West.

Furthermore, tensions were growing between Nureyev and the Kirov's artistic director Konstantin Sergeyev, who was also the husband of Nureyev's former dance partner Natalia Dudinskaya. After a representative of the French tour organisers saw Nureyev dance in Leningrad in 1960, the French organisers urged Soviet authorities to let him dance in Paris, and he was allowed to go. In Paris, his performances electrified audiences and critics.

Nureyev was seen to have broken the rules about mingling with foreigners and reportedly frequented gay bars in Paris, which alarmed the Kirov's management and the KGB agents observing him. The KGB wanted to send him back to the Soviet Union. On 16 June 1961, when the Kirov company gathered at Le Bourget Airport in Paris to fly to London, Sergeyev took Nureyev aside and told him that he must return to Moscow for a special performance in the Kremlin, rather than go on to London with the rest of the company. Nureyev became suspicious and refused.

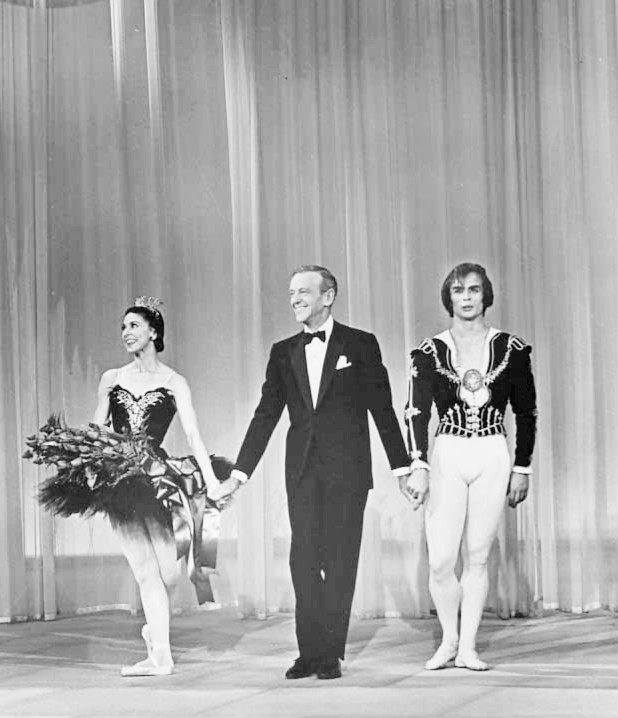
Margot Fonteyn, Fred Astaire and Nureyev from a 1965 appearance on the U.S. television show The Hollywood Palace

Next he was told that his mother had fallen severely ill and he needed to go home immediately to see her. Nureyev refused again, believing that on return to the USSR he was likely to be imprisoned. With the help of French police and a Parisian socialite friend, Clara Saint, who had been engaged to Vincent Malraux, the son of the French Minister of Culture, André Malraux, Nureyev escaped his KGB minders and asked for asylum. Sergeyev and the KGB tried to dissuade him, but he chose to stay in Paris. Soviet authorities made Nureyev's father, mother, and dance teacher Pushkin write letters to him, urging him to return, without effect.

Within a week, he was signed by the Grand Ballet du Marquis de Cuevas and performed The Sleeping Beauty with Nina Vyroubova. On a tour of Denmark, he met Erik Bruhn, soloist at the Royal Danish Ballet, who became his lover.

In October 1961, Nureyev was secretly invited to make his London debut at the annual gala organised by prima ballerina Dame Margot Fonteyn for the Royal Academy of Dance. Nureyev danced Poème Tragique, a solo choreographed by Frederick Ashton, and the Black Swan pas de deux from Swan Lake with Rosella Hightower. During this time, he met Dame Ninette de Valois, director of The Royal Ballet, who invited him to dance with Fonteyn the next season. After the gala, he danced in the South of France and in New York before returning to London.

=== The Royal Ballet ===
As a guest performer of The Royal Ballet, Nureyev first danced with Fonteyn on 21 February 1962. Nureyev received such a warm reception that he was given a contract to stay with the Royal Ballet for several more months and became a principal dancer. He quickly became a favourite dancer among the British and gained a following of young admirers. London critics called him the "Russian version of James Dean." Ballet critic Richard Buckle wrote for The Sunday Times: "A pop dancer—that's what we've got—a pop dancer at last. What the telly did for art, what Billy Graham did for religion and what the Duke of Bedford did for architecture, Nureyev has done for ballet."

In November 1961, their Pas de deux from Le Corsaire at the Royal Opera House was met with rave reviews. The Sunday Observer hailed Nureyev as a "Nijinsky reborn" and predicted the pair would go down in ballet history. The Daily Express called Nureyev's performance "incredibly breathtaking" and added that Fonteyn, who was 19 years his senior, "shed half her years to match him with contrasting grace and sparkle." Fonteyn and Nureyev were so well received that they proceeded to form a partnership that endured for many years. They premiered Romeo and Juliet for the company in 1965. Fans of the duo would tear up their programmes to make confetti to throw at the dancers. Nureyev and Fonteyn sometimes did more than 20 curtain calls. A film of this performance was made in 1966 and is available on DVD.

On 11 July 1967, Fonteyn and Nureyev, after performing in San Francisco, were arrested on nearby roofs, having fled during a police raid on a home in the Haight-Ashbury district. They were bailed out, and charges of disturbing the peace and visiting a place where marijuana was used were dropped later that day for lack of sufficient evidence.

Nureyev stayed with the Royal Ballet until 1970, when he was promoted to Principal Guest Artist, enabling him to concentrate on his increasing schedule of international guest appearances and tours. He continued to perform regularly with The Royal Ballet until committing his future to the Paris Opera Ballet in the 1980s.

=== International appearances ===
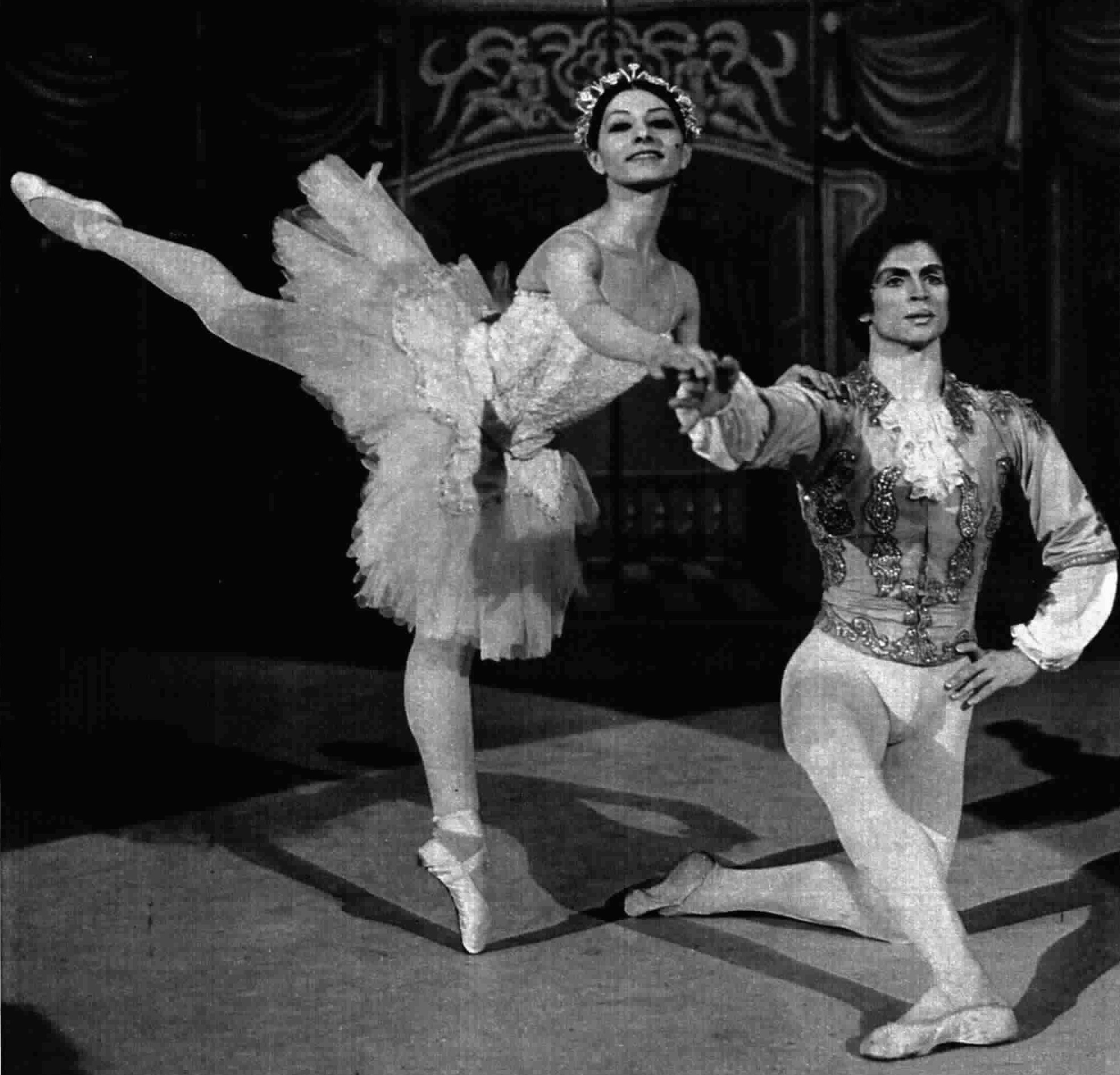
Nureyev with Liliana Cosi in Rome, 1972

Nuryev made his New York stage debut at the Brooklyn Academy of Music in New York on 10 March 1962, dancing the Don Quixote pas de deux with Sonia Arova.

In October 1962, he had a major showing as soloist with the Chicago Lyric Opera and the Chicago Opera Ballet.

Nuryev and his partner Braun appeared as guest dancers with the newly formed Australian Ballet at Her Majesty's Theatre, Sydney in December 1962.

Among many appearances in North America, Nureyev developed a long-lasting connection with the National Ballet of Canada, appearing as a guest artist on many occasions. In 1972, he staged a spectacular new production of Sleeping Beauty for the company, with his own additional choreography augmenting that of Petipa. The production toured widely in the U.S. and Canada after its initial run in Toronto, one performance of which was televised live and subsequently issued on video.

Among the National Ballet's ballerinas, Nureyev most frequently partnered with Veronica Tennant and Karen Kain. In 1975 Nureyev worked extensively with American Ballet Theatre resurrecting Le Corsaire with Gelsey Kirkland. He recreated Sleeping Beauty, Swan Lake, and Ramonda with Cynthia Gregory. Gregory and Brun joined Nureyev in a pas des trois from the little-known August Bournonville ballet La Ventana.

=== The Paris Opera Ballet ===
In January 1982, Austria granted Nureyev citizenship, ending more than 21 years of statelessness. He had been travelling on a United Nations Geneva Convention passport.

In 1983, he was appointed director of the Paris Opera Ballet, where, as well as directing, he continued to dance and to promote younger dancers. He remained there as a dancer and chief choreographer until 1989. Among the dancers he mentored were Sylvie Guillem, Isabelle Guérin, Manuel Legris, Elisabeth Maurin, Élisabeth Platel, Charles Jude, and Monique Loudières.

His artistic directorship of the Paris Opera Ballet was a great success, lifting the company out of a dark period. His version of Sleeping Beauty remains in the repertoire and was revived and filmed with his protégé Manuel Legris in the male lead.

Despite advancing illness towards the end of his tenure, he worked tirelessly, staging new versions of old standbys and commissioning some of the most ground-breaking choreographic works of his time. His own Romeo and Juliet was a popular success. When he was sick towards the end of his life, he worked on a final production of La Bayadère which closely follows the Mariinsky Ballet version he danced as a young man.

=== Illness and final years ===
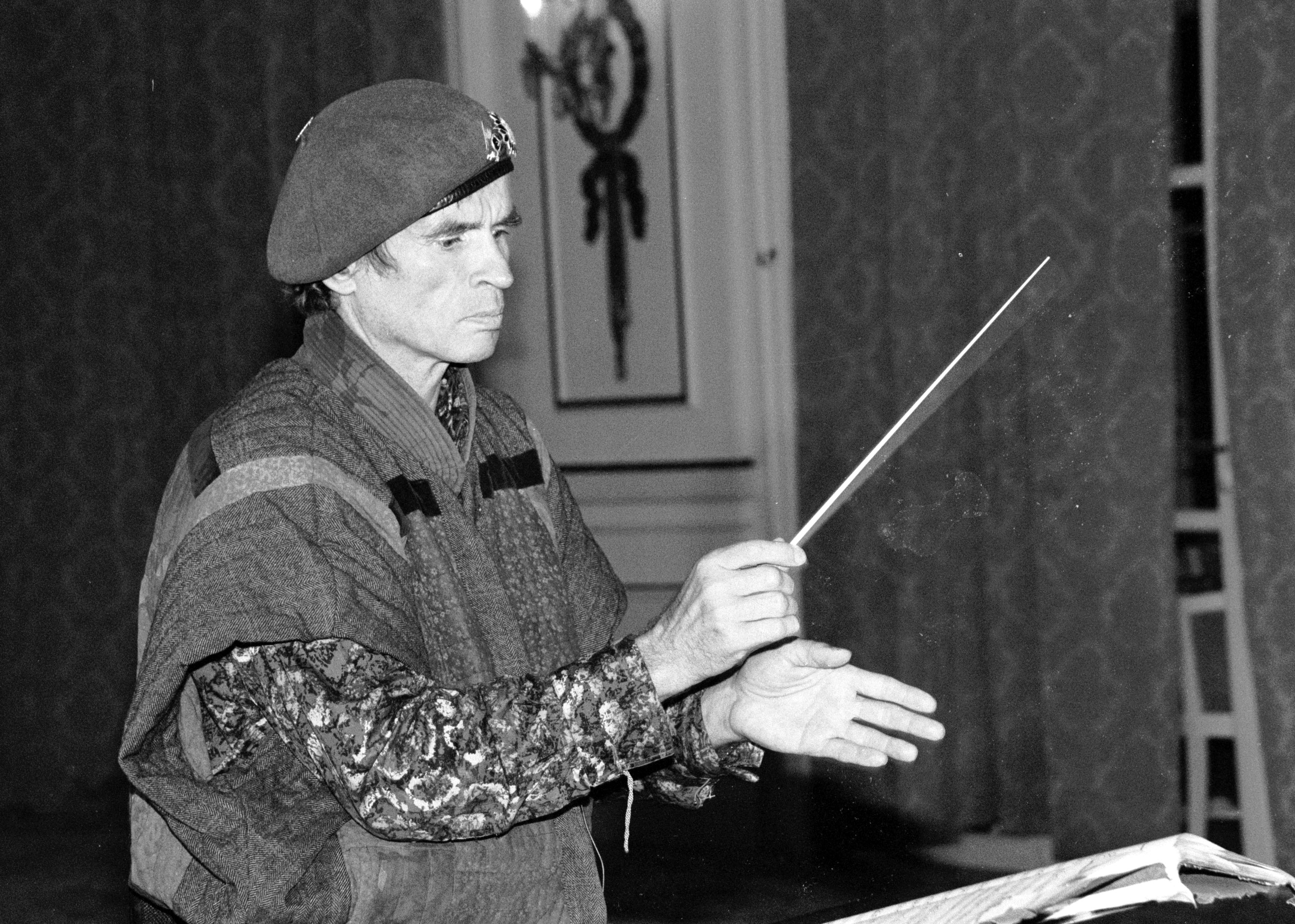
Nureyev's first time conducting an ensemble, in Deauville, France (1991)

Nureyev tested positive for HIV in 1984, but for several years he denied that anything was wrong with his health. However, by the late 1980s his diminished capabilities were becoming obvious.

Although he petitioned the Soviet government for many years to be allowed to visit his mother, he was not allowed to do so until 1987, when his mother was dying and Mikhail Gorbachev consented to the visit.

In 1989, he was invited to dance the role of James in La Sylphide with the Mariinsky Ballet at the Mariinsky Theatre in Leningrad. The visit gave him the opportunity to see many of the teachers and colleagues he had not seen since his defection.

Nureyev began a marked decline in the summer of 1991 and entered the final phase of the disease in the spring of 1992. In March 1992, living with advanced AIDS, he visited Kazan and appeared as a conductor in front of the audience at Musa Cälil Tatar Academic Opera and Ballet Theatre, which now presents the Rudolf Nureyev Festival in Tatarstan. Returning to Paris, with a high fever, he was admitted to the Notre Dame du Perpétuel Secours hospital in Levallois-Perret, a suburb northwest of Paris, and was operated on for pericarditis, an inflammation of the membranous sac around the heart. He was determined to recover so that he could fulfill an invitation to conduct Prokofiev's Romeo and Juliet at an American Ballet Theatre benefit on 6 May 1992 at the Metropolitan Opera House in New York. He did so and was elated at the reception.

In July 1992, Nureyev showed renewed signs of pericarditis but declined further treatment. His last public appearance was on 8 October 1992, at the premiere at Palais Garnier of a new production of La Bayadère that he choreographed after Marius Petipa for the Paris Opera Ballet. Nureyev had managed to obtain a photocopy of Ludwig Minkus' original score when in Russia in 1989. The ballet was a personal triumph although the gravity of his condition was evident. The French Culture Minister, Jack Lang, presented him that evening on stage with France's highest cultural award, the Commandeur de l'Ordre des Arts et des Lettres.

== Death ==
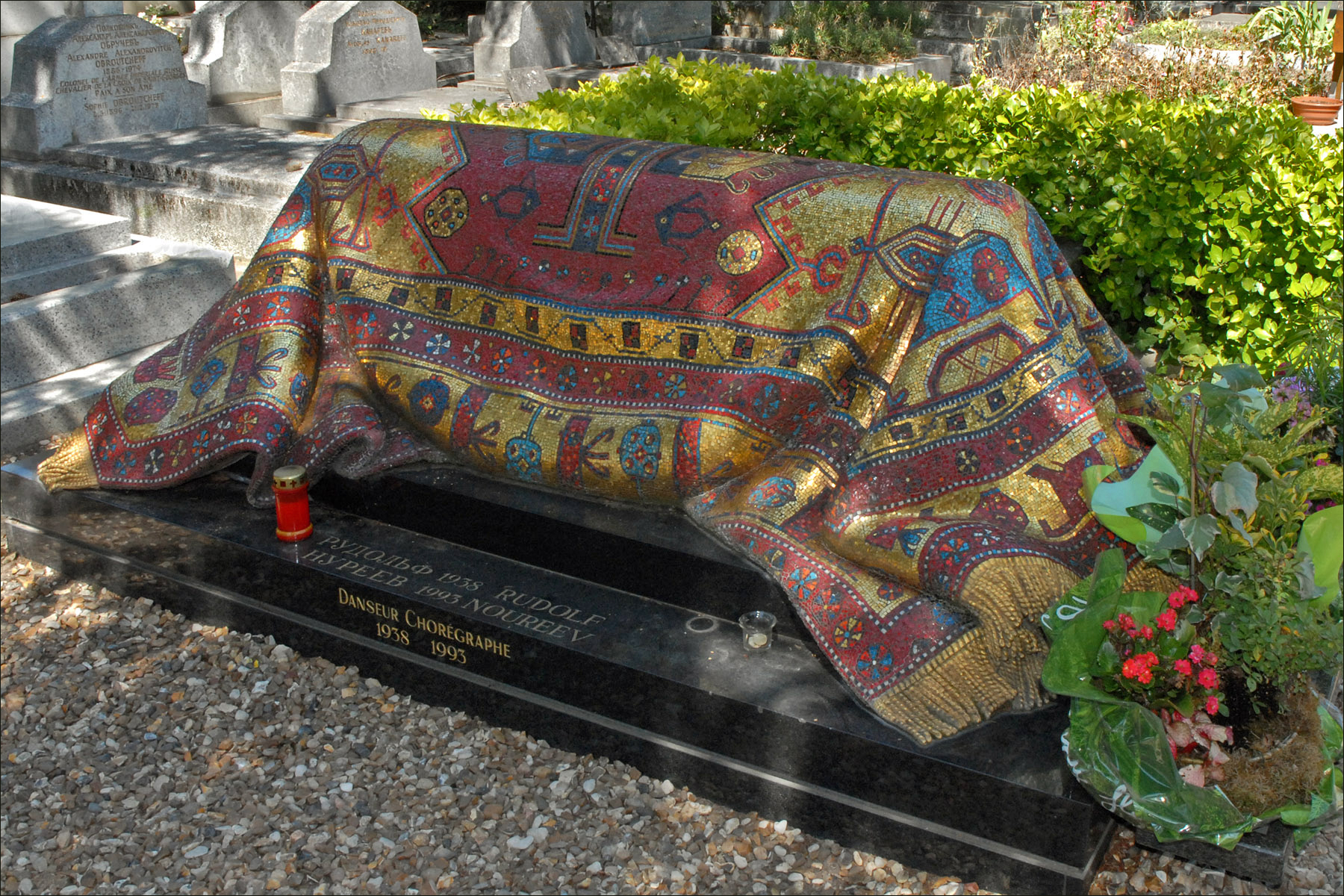
Nureyev's tomb in Sainte-Geneviève-des-Bois, draped in a mosaic of a traditional Tatar carpet

Nureyev re-entered the Notre Dame du Perpétuel Secours hospital in Levallois-Perret on 20 November 1992, and remained there until he died on 6 January 1993, at the age of 54, from AIDS complication; his diagnosis was not made public until the morning of his death.

His funeral was held in the marble foyer of the Palais Garnier Opera House. Many paid tribute to his brilliance as a dancer. One such tribute came from Oleg Vinogradov of the Mariinsky Ballet, stating: "What Nureyev did in the West, he could never have done here."

Nureyev's grave, at the Russian cemetery in Sainte-Geneviève-des-Bois near Paris, features a tomb draped in a mosaic of an Oriental carpet, a kilim. Nureyev was an avid collector of beautiful carpets and antique textiles. As his coffin was lowered into the ground, music from the last act of Giselle was played and his ballet shoes were cast into the grave along with white lilies.

== Repertoire ==
A selected list of ballet performances, ballet productions and original ballets.

- Laurencia – Frondoso
- Swan Lake – Prince Siegfried, Rothbart
- The Nutcracker – Drosselmeyer, Prince
- Sleeping Beauty – Blue Bird, Prince Florimund (Desiree)
- Marguerite and Armand – Armand
- La Bayadere – Solor
- Raymonda – Four Knights, Jean de Brienne
- Giselle – Count Albrecht
- Don Quixote – Basilio
- Le Corsaire – Ali
- Romeo and Juliet – Romeo, Mercutio
- La Sylphide – James
- Petrushka – Petrushka
- Le Spectre de la rose – The Spirit of the Rose
- Scheherazade – Golden Slave
- Afternoon Rest of the Faun – Faun
- Apollo – Apollo
- The Young Man and Death – Youth
- Prodigal Son
- Phaedra's Dream, choreographed by Martha Graham as the role of Hippolyte
- Paradise Lost, choreographed by Roland Petit
- Les Sylphides – Youth
- Hamlet by Robert Helpmann – Hamlet
- Cinderella, choreographed and produced by Nureyev
- Gayane, choreographed by Nina Anisimova (solo performance)
- Pierrot Lunaire, choreographed by Glen Tetley as the role of Pierrot
- Lucifer, choreographed by Martha Graham – Lucifer
- Idiot by Valery Panov – Prince Myshkin
- Coppélia
- Songs of a Wayfarer, choreographed by Maurice Béjart
- The Rite of Spring
- The Moor's Pavane – Othello
- Orpheus, choreographed by George Balanchine as the role of Orpheus
- Songs Without Words, choreographed by Hans van Manen
- The Tempest, choreographed by Nureyev as the role of Prospero
- Night Journey, choreographed by Martha Graham as the role of Oedipus
- The Scarlet Letter, choreographed by Martha Graham as the role of Rev. Dimsdale
- Notre Dame of Paris, choreographed by Roland Petit as the role of Quasimodo
- La Esmeralda, choreographed by Vakhtang Chabukiani
- Ecuatorial, choreographed by Martha Graham, lead with Yuriko Kimura

=== Dance partners ===
Yvette Chauviré of the Paris Opera Ballet often danced with Nureyev; he described her as a "legend". Chauviré attended his funeral with French dancer and actress Leslie Caron.

At the Royal Ballet, Nureyev and Margot Fonteyn became long-standing dance partners. Nureyev once said of Fonteyn, who was 19 years older than him, that they danced with "one body, one soul". Together Nureyev and Fonteyn premiered Sir Frederick Ashton's ballet Marguerite and Armand, a ballet danced to Liszt's Piano Sonata in B minor, which became their signature piece. Kenneth MacMillan was forced to allow them to premiere his Romeo and Juliet, which was intended for two other dancers, Lynn Seymour and Christopher Gable. Films exist of their partnership in Les Sylphides, Swan Lake, Romeo and Juliet, and other roles. They continued to dance together for many years after Nureyev's departure from the Royal Ballet. Their last performance together was in Baroque Pas de Trois on 16 September 1988 when Fonteyn was 69, Nureyev was aged 50, with Carla Fracci, aged 52, also starring.

He celebrated another long-time partnership with Eva Evdokimova. They first appeared together in La Sylphide (1971) and in 1975 he selected her as his Sleeping Beauty in his staging for London Festival Ballet. Evdokimova remained his partner of choice for many guest appearances and tours across the globe with "Nureyev and Friends" for more than fifteen years.

During his American stage debut in 1962, Nureyev also partnered with Sonia Arova at New York City's Brooklyn Academy of Music. In collaboration with Ruth Page's Chicago Opera Ballet, they performed the grand pas de deux from Don Quixote.

== Personal life ==
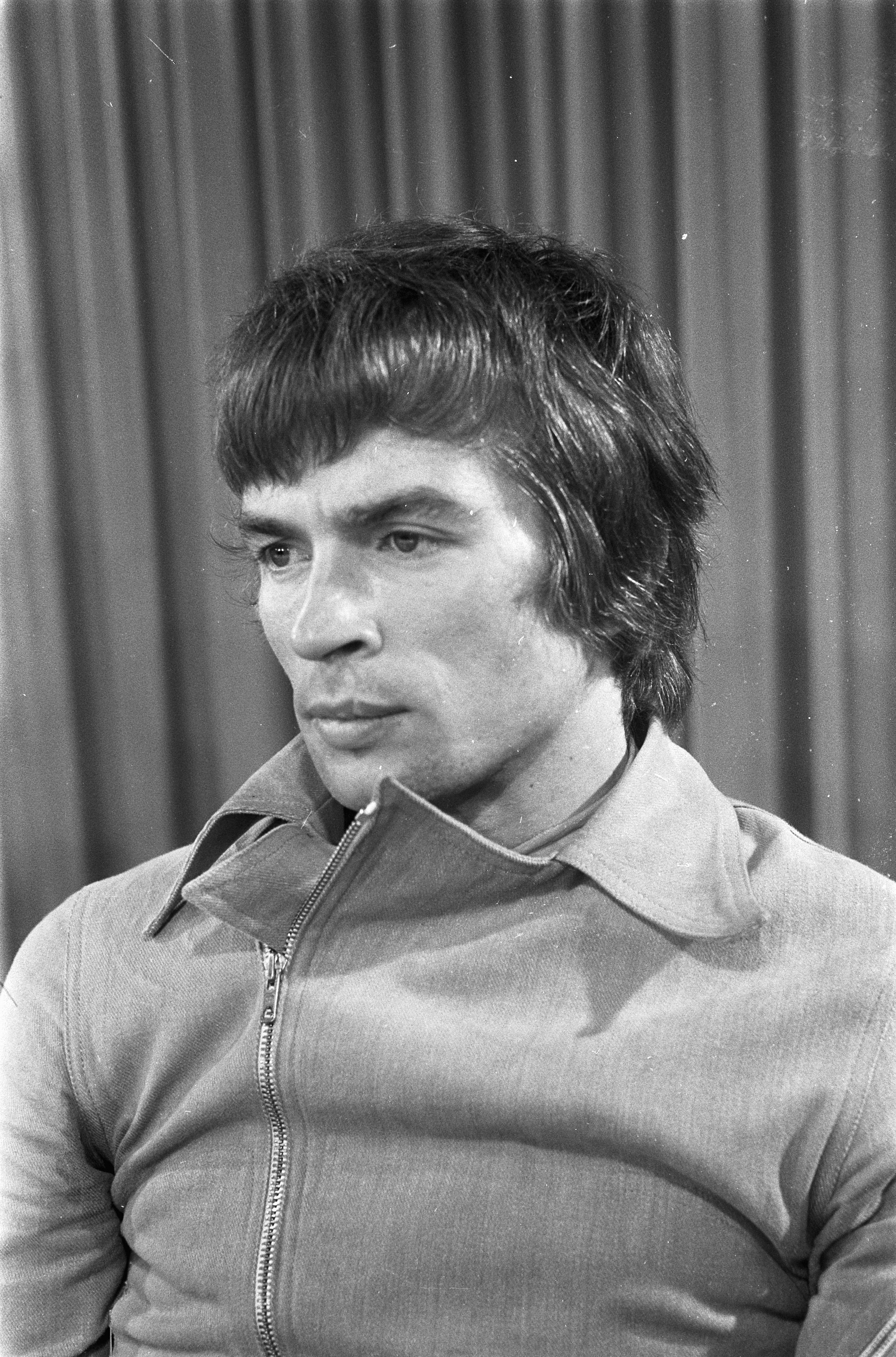
Nureyev in 1968

=== Personality and friendships ===
Nureyev did not have much patience with rules, limitations and hierarchical order and had at times a volatile temper. He was apt to throw tantrums in public when frustrated. His impatience mainly showed itself when the failings of others interfered with his work.

In the 1970s, he went to the New York discotheque Studio 54 on occasion and socialised with Ringo Starr, Gore Vidal, Jackie Kennedy Onassis, Mick Jagger, Liza Minnelli, Andy Warhol, Lee Radziwill, Talitha Pol, Jessye Norman, and Tamara Toumanova. However, he developed an intolerance for celebrities. He kept up old friendships in and out of the ballet world for decades, and was considered to be a loyal and generous friend.

In 1977, Nureyev and Jamie Wyeth became unexpected friends when the dancer was staying at the artist's property in Maine. Wyeth compared Nureyev's off-stage charisma to "having a panther in the house." Nureyev posed for 41 drawings and paintings, which have been described as some of Wyeth's "most vibrant, vivacious works.

Most ballerinas with whom Nureyev danced, including Antoinette Sibley, Cynthia Gregory, Gelsey Kirkland and Annette Page, paid tribute to him as a considerate partner. He was known as extremely generous to many ballerinas, who credit him with helping them during difficult times. In particular, the Canadian ballerina Lynn Seymour – distressed when she was denied the opportunity to premiere MacMillan's Romeo and Juliet – says that Nureyev often found projects for her even when she was suffering from weight problems and depression and thus had trouble finding roles.

=== Sexuality and relationships ===
Depending on the source, Nureyev is described as either bisexual, as he did have heterosexual relationships as a young man, or homosexual. Even though he had several long-term partners, he was promiscuous, and frequented gay bathhouses and engaged in anonymous pick-ups. "I used to fly to Paris from London for sex," he once boasted. "God, it was great. The English were too prudish and reserved, but in Paris . . . !"

Nureyev met Erik Bruhn, the celebrated Danish dancer, after Nureyev defected to the West in 1961. Nureyev was a great admirer of Bruhn, having seen filmed performances of the Dane on tour in the Soviet Union with the American Ballet Theatre, although stylistically the two dancers were very different. Bruhn and Nureyev became a couple and they had a volatile on-and-off relationship until 1966. They remained friends until Bruhn died in 1986.

In 1969, Nureyev met Wallace Potts in Atlanta during the Royal Ballet Tour of North America. Potts, a recent physics graduate from Georgia Tech, had a greater passion for theatre and cinema. Immediately drawn to one another, the two men were soon living together. Potts often accompanied Nureyev on tour and made 16mm films of him rehearsing and performing. Life with Potts developed into "a kind of marriage," offering the stability he so desperately sought, but Nureyev's infidelities caused a strain in their relationship. In 1975, Potts left Nureyev when he walked in on him having sex with a Frenchman. According to a friend, "there had been no lover whose loyalty" Nureyev valued more than Potts and he regretted not staying with him. Following Nureyev's death, Potts worked as a film archivist for the Rudolf Nureyev Foundation.

In 1979, Nureyev met American dancer and classical arts student Robert Tracy. They were lovers for the first two and a half years, and Tracy became Nureyev's secretary. Tracy lived at Nureyev's New York apartment at the Dakota until 1993. In 1992, Tracy had hired a lawyer to negotiate a settlement from Nureyev. Despite working on books, Tracy had no reliable source of money and was concerned about his own health. Although he continued to reside at the Dakota, Nureyev's lawyer sent him three eviction notices the week before Nureyev died.

Following Nureyev's death, under an agreement with the Rudolf Nureyev Foundation, Tracy was paid $600,000 in instalments on the condition that he would not speak publicly about their relationship. After the agreement lapsed, Tracy spoke to The Guardian about their relationship in 2003: "He was content not to commit himself to one person. I was happy not to be committed too, it meant I was free. It was 1979, towards the end of the gay revolution. I never thought he would live exclusively with me. I had boyfriends—and girlfriends—too." According to Tracy, Nureyev said that he had a relationship with three women in his life, he had always wanted a son, and once had plans to father one with Nastassja Kinski.

=== Residences and collections ===
In 1979, Nureyev purchased an apartment in the Dakota in New York. In 1981, he bought an apartment at 23 Quai Voltaire in Paris.

In January 1995, the contents of Nureyev's six-room Manhattan apartment were auctioned at Christie's in New York. Proceeds from the sale went to the Rudolf Nureyev Foundation. There were rows of his worn ballet slippers, a collection of his famous hats, and the costumes he donned in ballets. There was also a copper Victorian bathtub, a rococo Venetian glass chandelier, an Elizabethan carved oak tester bed that he kept covered with exotic shawls and kilims, and two upholstered sofas that had belonged to the soprano Maria Callas. His collection of paintings included Joshua Reynolds' Portrait of George Townshend, Lord de Ferrars and Henry Fuseli's Satan Starting From the Touch of Ithuriel's Lance. A total of $7.94 million was accumulated during the two-day sale.

In November 1995, the items in Nureyev's Paris apartment were put up for auction at Christie's in London. Four paintings by Theodore Gericault were among the collection, but the major letdown of the sale was that they were not sold. However, there was a lot of interest in items that showed the dancer's unique taste: a Russian Karelian-birch library table; a double manual harpsichord made by Johannes Ruckers in 1627; five velvet 18th-century gaming purses; Japanese obis and sashes for kimonos; formal dresses, court suits and waistcoats from 18th- and 19th-century France and England; a large collection of 19th-century Kashmir scarves; and dozens of classical LPs of symphonic, ballet, chamber, and baroque music. The two-day sale brought in $2.79 million, and the proceeds went to the Rudolf Nureyev Foundation.

== Legacy ==
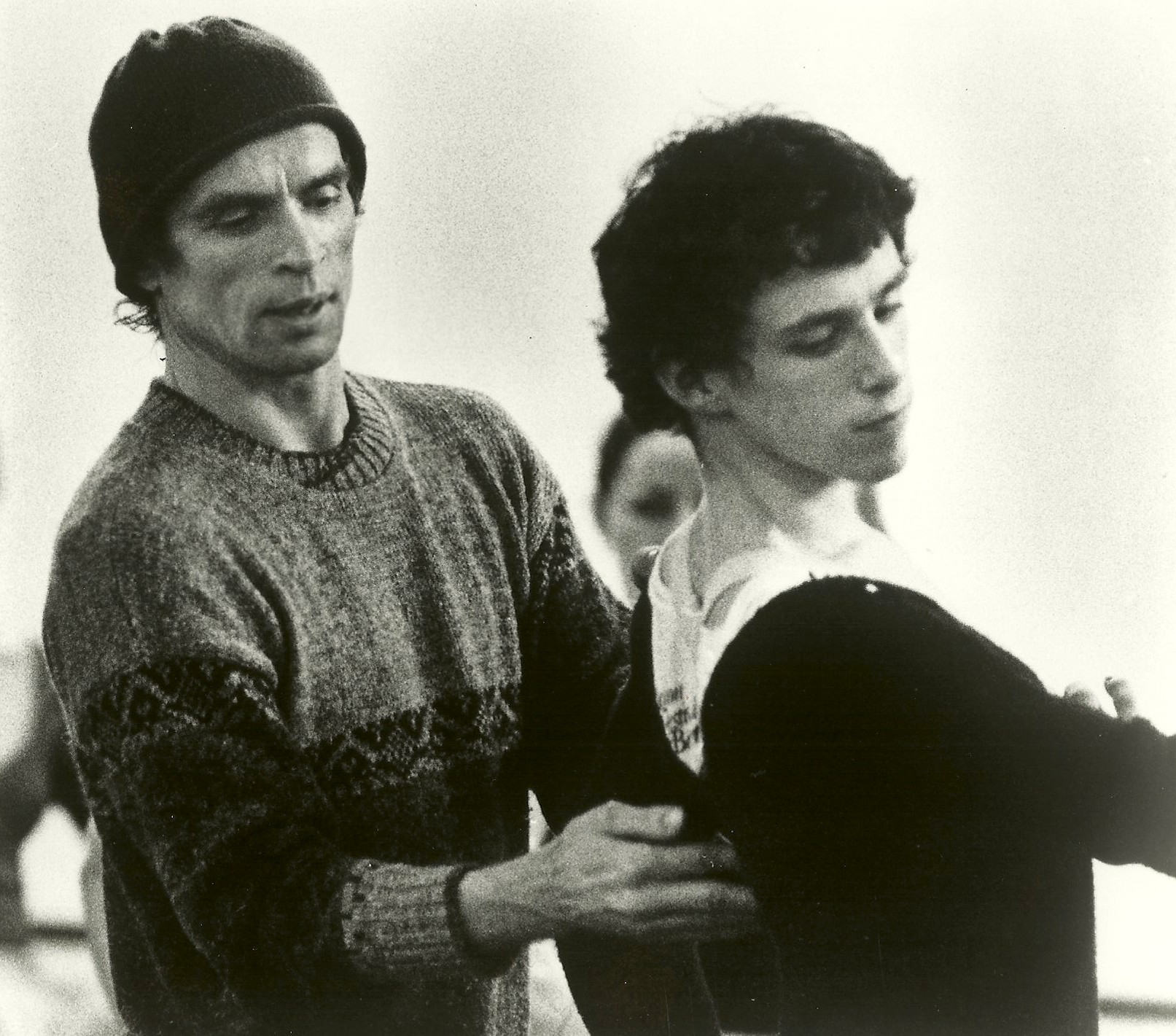
Nureyev coaching Devon Carney in his production of Don Quixote

=== The Rudolf Nureyev Foundation ===
In 1975, Nureyev founded the Ballet Promotion Foundation with the goals of managing and investing an endowment fund and any other assets, as well as allocating grants from investment revenue to the Foundation's beneficiaries. He left an estimated $33 million to his nonprofit, which was renamed after him in 1994. Its objects essentially stayed the same, albeit some were clarified and broadened as directed by Nureyev prior to his death. The Rudolf Nureyev Foundation "protects and preserves Nureyev’s legacy for the future, ensuring his choreography is performed to the highest possible standards."

=== As an influence ===
Nureyev was above all a stickler for classical technique, and his mastery of it made him a model for an entire generation of dancers. If the standard of male dancing rose so visibly in the West after the 1960s, it was largely because of Nureyev's inspiration.

Nureyev's influence on the world of ballet changed the perception of male dancers; in his own productions of the classics the male roles received much more choreography. Another important influence was his crossing the borders between classical ballet and modern dance by performing both. Today it is normal for dancers to receive training in both styles, but Nureyev was the originator and excelled in modern and classical dance. He went out of his way to work with modern dance great, Martha Graham, and she created a work specially for him. Nureyev made great strides in gaining acceptance of Modern Dance in the "Classical Ballet" sphere.

External videos
- Nureyev and the Joffrey Ballet in PBS's Tribute to Nijinsky dancing: Petrouchka (Fokine); Le Spectre de la Rose (Fokine); L'Apres midi d'un Faune (Nijinsky) in 1981

Nureyev's charisma, commitment and generosity were such that he did not just pass on his knowledge. He personified the school of life for a dancer. Several dancers, who were principals with the Paris Opera Ballet under his direction, went on to become ballet directors themselves inspired to continue Nureyev's work and ideas. Manuel Legris was director of the Vienna State Ballet and now directs La Scala Theatre Ballet, Laurent Hilaire was ballet director of the Stanislavski Theatre of Moscow and is now director of Bavarian State Ballet at Munich, and Charles Jude was ballet director of the Grand Théâtre de Bordeaux.

Mikhail Baryshnikov, the other great dancer who like Nureyev defected to the West, holds Nureyev in high regard. Baryshnikov said in an interview that Nureyev was an unusual man in all respects, instinctive, intelligence, constant curiosity, and extraordinary discipline, that was his goal of life and of course love in performing.

=== Technique and quest for perfection ===
Nureyev had a late start to ballet and had to perfect his technique to be a success. John Tooley wrote that Nureyev grew up very poor and had to make up for three to five years in ballet education at a high-level ballet school, giving him a decisive impetus to acquire the maximum of technical skills and to become the best dancer working on perfection during his whole career. The challenge for all dancers whom Nureyev worked with was to follow suit and to share his total commitment for dance. Advocates to describe the Nureyev phenomenon precisely are John Tooley, former general director of the London's Royal Opera House, Pierre Bergé, former president of Opéra Bastille, venue of the Paris Opera Ballet (in addition to the Palais Garnier) and Manuel Legris, principal dancer with the Paris Opera Ballet nominated by Nureyev in New York.

Nureyev put it like this: "I approach dancing from a different angle than those who begin dancing at eight or nine. Those who have studied from the beginning never question anything." Nureyev entered the Vaganova Ballet Academy at the age of 17 staying there for only three years compared to dancers who usually become principal dancers after entering the Vaganova school at nine and go through the full nine years of dance education. Nureyev was a contemporary of Vladimir Vasiliev, who was the premiere dancer at the Bolshoi. Later, Nureyev was a predecessor to Mikhail Baryshnikov at the Kirov Ballet, now the Mariinsky Theater. Unlike Vasiliev and Baryshnikov, Nureyev did not build his reputation on success in international ballet competitions, but rather through his performances and popular image.

Paradoxically, both Nureyev and Mikhail Baryshnikov became masters of perfection in dance. Dance and life was one and the same, Pierre Bergé said about Nureyev: "He was a dancer like any other dancer. It is extraordinary to have 19 points out of 20. It is extremely rare to have 20 out of 20. However, to have 21 out of 20 is even much rarer. And this was the situation with Nureyev." Legris said: "Rudolf Nureyev was a high-speed train (he was a TGV)." Working with Nureyev involved having to surpass oneself and "stepping on it."

== Awards and honours ==

Chevalier of the Legion of Honour (France)	Commandeur of the Ordre des Arts et des Lettres (France)

After so many years of having been denied a place in the Mariinsky Ballet's history, Nureyev's reputation was restored. His name was re-entered in the history of the Mariinsky, even though he danced there for only three years. Some of his personal effects were placed on display at the theatre museum in what is now St. Petersburg. A rehearsal room was named in his honour at the famed Vaganova Academy. As of October 2013, the Centre National du Costume de Scène has a permanent collection of Nureyev's costumes "that offers visitors a sense of his exuberant, vagabond personality and passion for all that was rare and beautiful."

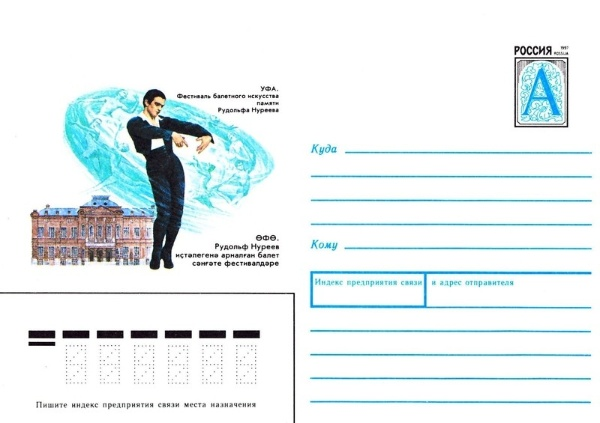
1997 Russian postal cover honouring Nureyev

Since his death in 1993, the Paris Opera has instituted a tradition of presenting an evening of dance homage to Nureyev every 10 years. Because he was born in March, these performances have been given on 20 March 2003, 6 March 2013 and 18 March 2023.

In 2015, Nureyev was inducted into the Legacy Walk in Chicago and the National Museum of Dance and Hall of Fame in Saratoga Springs.

On 7 November 2018, a monument honouring Nureyev was unveiled at the square near the Musa Cälil Tatar Academic Opera and Ballet Theater in Kazan. The monument was designed by Zurab Tsereteli and its unveiling ceremony was attended by President of Tatarstan Rustam Minnikhanov, state adviser of the Republic of Tatarstan Mintimer Shaimiev and mayor of Kazan Ilsur Metshin. At a speech in the unveiling event, Minnikhanov stated "I think, not only for the Republic, Rudolf Nureyev is an international value. Such people are born once in a hundred years."

== Film, television and musical roles ==
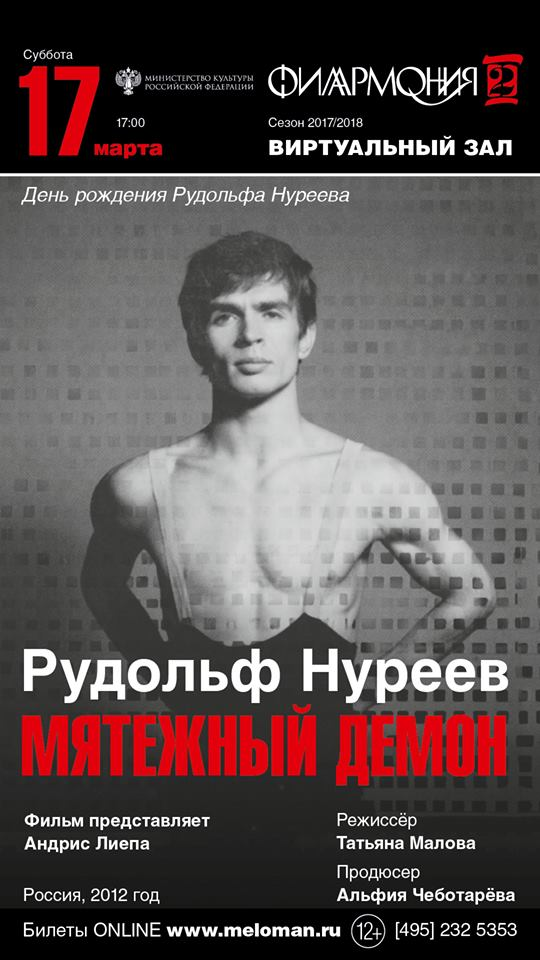
Poster of the 2012 Russian documentary film about Nureyev, Rudolf Nureyev: Rebellious Demon

In 1962, Nureyev made his screen debut in a film version of Les Sylphides. He decided against an acting career to branch into modern dance with the Dutch National Ballet in 1968. Nureyev also made his debut in 1962 on network television in America partnered with Maria Tallchief dancing the pas de deux from August Bournonville's Flower Festival in Genzano on The Bell Telephone Hour.

In 1972, Sir Robert Helpmann invited him to tour Australia with Nureyev's production of Don Quixote. In 1973, a film version of Don Quixote was directed by Nureyev and Helpmann and features Nureyev as Basilio, Lucette Aldous as Kitri, Helpmann as Don Quixote and artists of the Australian Ballet.

In 1972, Nureyev was a guest in David Winters' television special The Special London Bridge Special. In 1973 he appeared in a cameo for The Morecambe & Wise Show Christmas Special.

In 1977, Nureyev played Rudolph Valentino in Ken Russell's film Valentino.

In 1978, he appeared as a guest star on the television series The Muppet Show where he danced in a parody called "Swine Lake", sang "Baby, It's Cold Outside" in a sauna duet with Miss Piggy, and sang and tap-danced in the show's finale, "Top Hat, White Tie and Tails". His appearance is credited with making Jim Henson's series become one of the most sought after programmes to appear in.

In 1979, Nureyev collaborated with Stanley Dorfman to direct a stage and television special performance of Giselle, with music composed by Adolphe Adam. Dorfman also took on the role of producer. The ballet was recorded in a studio setting and remains the only filmed performance of the unabridged version featuring Nureyev. Nureyev portrayed the character of Prince Albrecht, while Lynn Seymour took on the role of Giselle. Monica Mason from The Royal Ballet performed as Myrtha, the Queen of the ghostly Wilis. The Ballet of the Bavarian State Opera played a significant part in the production, and The New World Philharmonic was conducted by David Coleman.

In 1983, he had a non-dancing role in the movie Exposed with Nastassja Kinski.

In 1989, he toured the United States and Canada for 24 weeks with a revival of the Broadway musical The King and I.

=== Documentary films ===
- Rudolf Noureev au travail à la barre (Rudolf Noureev Exercising at the Barre) (1970) (4 min 13)
- Nureyev (1981), by Thames Television. Includes a candid interview, as well as access to him in the studio.
- Nureyev (1991). Directed by Patricia Foy, the 90-minute documentary chronicles the ups and downs of Nureyev's career, and his professional relationship with Margot Fonteyn, his rumoured depression and his overall effect on modern dance.
- Rudolf Nureyev – As He Is (1991). Directed by Nikolai Boronin, the 47-minute Soviet documentary about Nureyev also includes a long interview with Nureyev during his visit to Leningrad in 1990.
- Nureyev: From Russia with Love (2007), by John Bridcut
- Rudolf Nureyev: Rebellious Demon (2012). Directed by Tatyana Malova, the Russian documentary explores the life of Nureyev. The documentary was released on the 80th birth anniversary of Nureyev.
- Rudolf Nureyev – Dance to Freedom (2015), Richard Curson Smith
- Rudolf Nureev. The Island of His Dream (2016) (Russian: Рудольф Нуреев. Остров его мечты, Rudolf Nureyev. Ostrov ego mechty) by Evgeniya Tirdatova
- Nureyev: Lifting the Curtain (2018). Directed by David and Jacqui Morris, the documentary looks into the extraordinary life of Nureyev, with archive interviews and dance sequences.

== In pop culture ==
Ballet

- Nureyev (2017), a ballet production of the Bolshoi Theatre, directed by Kirill Serebrennikov and Yuri Posokhov. The premiere, scheduled for 11 July 2017, was suddenly cancelled by theatre director Vladimir Urin three days before the opening, reportedly by the intervention over "gay propaganda" by Culture Minister Vladimir Medinsky, and finally opened on 9 and 10 December 2017. It was permanently dropped from the theatre's repertoire in April 2023, due to the signing into law of LGBT censorship. In March 2026, "Nureyev" premiered with the Staatsballett Berlin, for the first time outside Russia.

Books

- McCann, Colum (2003). Dancer. Weidenfeld. ISBN 978-0-8050-6792-7. Novel based on Nureyev's life.

Film

- The White Crow (2018). Directed by Ralph Fiennes, Oleg Ivenko plays Nureyev as an adult. The film culminates in his defection at Le Bourget Airport when he was 23 years old. Earlier scenes narrate Nureyev's life: from his birth aboard the train, to childhood lessons in his native Tatar dance, his "ruthless dedication" to the art form, his rigorous training and early ballet performances at the Mariinsky Theatre. The film shows his strong individualist tendency and aloof demeanour, at times appearing arrogant and even cruel.
- In 2026, it was announced that filming would begin on "Margot & Rudy." The film tells the story of the relationship between Rudolf Nureyev and Margot Fonteyn. Naomi Watts will play Margot.

Music

- "Dancing Star", a 2024 song by English synth-pop duo Pet Shop Boys, recounts Nureyev's life and career.

== See also ==
- List of dancers
- List of Eastern Bloc defectors
- List of Russian ballet dancers
- List of Soviet and Eastern Bloc defectors
