= Robert R. Shafer =

American actor (born 1958)

- Shafer in 2007
- Born: Robert Ray Shafer Jr. April 10, 1958 (age 68); Charleston, West Virginia, U.S.
- Education: Broward College (attended)
- Height: 6 ft 4 in (193 cm)

Robert Ray Shafer (born April 10, 1958) is an American character actor who has appeared in film and television. Shafer, sometimes credited as Bobby Ray Shafer, is best known for playing Bob Vance on the American sitcom The Office. In 1989, he portrayed Officer Ted Warnicky (also known as Joe Vickers) in the horror-comedy Psycho Cop and later reprised the role in Psycho Cop 2.

== Early life and education ==
Robert Ray Shafer, Jr. was born in Charleston, West Virginia, in 1958. His father, a heavy equipment operator, died in a car accident when he was nine years old. He attended high school in Romeo, Michigan, and graduated in 1976.

Shafer attended Broward College in Fort Lauderdale, Florida, before moving to Los Angeles where he modeled and took acting classes with Peggy Feury.

== Filmography ==
=== Film ===
| Year | Title | Role | Notes |
|---|---|---|---|
| 1984 | The Rosebud Beach Hotel | Rodney | |
| 1986 | Echo Park | Commercial Director | |
| 1987 | Hollywood Shuffle | Commercial Director | |
| 1989 | Future Force | David Harris | |
| 1989 | Psycho Cop | Officer Joe Vickers | |
| 1990 | Dark Romances Vol. 1 | Voice overs | Direct-to-video |
| 1991 | Inside Out | Cuddy Dalton | Direct-to-video |
| 1993 | Psycho Cop Returns | Officer Joe Vickers | |
| 1994 | A Brilliant Disguise | Jimmy Brennan | |
| 1997 | The Corporate Ladder | Jack Sherman | |
| 1997 | Mister Atlas | Wilshire Frodden | |
| 2000 | Finding Kelly | Sheriff Posey | |
| 2002 | Contagion | Wallace | |
| 2003 | Monster Man | Police Officer #1 | |
| 2005 | Choker | Clark | |
| 2006 | All In | Slick Moustached Player | |
| 2006 | Slip' | M-16 Man | |
| 2007 | Protecting the King | Officer Gibbs | |
| 2008 | Stiletto | Krieger | Direct-to-video |
| 2008 | Dark Honeymoon | Sheriff Fields | Direct-to-video |
| 2009 | Heat Wave | Roy Rogan | TV film |
| 2009 | The Scenesters | George Porter | |
| 2009 | The Gold Retrievers | Sheriff Mike Denton | |
| 2009 | Reconciliation | Pastor Hughes | |
| 2009 | Maneater | Gus | Direct-to-video |
| 2010 | Turbulent Skies | Jackson | TV film |
| 2010 | Screwball: The Ted Whitfield Story | Nick Middlesworth | |
| 2010 | Mega Shark Versus Crocosaurus | Charlie Ross | Direct-to-video |
| 2011 | Hard Hats | Arno Jones | Short film |
| 2011 | Mega Python vs. Gatoroid | Zeke | TV film |
| 2011 | Knifepoint | Michael | |
| 2011 | Video Breakups | | Short film |
| 2011 | Getting That Girl | Coach Thieson | |
| 2011 | Super Shark | Commander Williams | |
| 2012 | The Temple | Zipper | Voice role |
| 2012 | Collision Course | Pilot | |
| 2012 | Revelations | Dad | Short film |
| 2012 | FDR: American Badass! | Robby Kreeger | |
| 2012 | Retribution | James Cooper | TV film |
| 2012 | The Adventures of Soap Man | Sexual Harasser | Short film |
| 2013 | Abner, the Invisible Dog | Charlie | |
| 2013 | Mrs. Sweeney | Mr. O'Neal | Short film |
| 2014 | Zombeavers | Trucker | |
| 2014 | Asteroid vs Earth | Lieutenant Rouse | TV film |
| 2014 | Friended to Death | Chuck Henson | |
| 2015 | Loaded | Mechanic | |
| 2015 | Helen Keller vs. Nightwolves | Arthur | |
| 2015 | A Christmas Reunion | Frank O'Brien | TV film |
| 2016 | Pee-wee's Big Holiday | Construction Worker | |
| 2016 | Mark Upon the Flesh | Homeless Man | Short film |
| 2017 | Awaken the Shadowman | Tom | |
| 2017 | Blotched | Edward Gluer | |
| 2018 | Dick Dickster | Dick Dickster | |
| 2020 | The Onania Club | Military Dad | |
| 2020 | Caged | Officer Ganser | |

=== Television ===
| Year | Title | Role | Notes |
|---|---|---|---|
| 1985 | Highway to Heaven | Dennis | Episode: "As Difficult as ABC" |
| 1993 | Wings | Otto | Episode: "The Key to Alex" |
| 1998 | Arli$ | Reporter | Episode: "Where Do Clients Come From?" |
| 1999 | Becker | Mr. Preston | Episode: "Hate Thy Neighbour" |
| 2000 | Titus | Bar Patron | Episode: "Red Asphalt" |
| 2001 | Malcolm in the Middle | Police Officer | Episode: Flashback |
| 2001 | Ultimate Revenge | Mobster | Episode: "2 December 2001" |
| 2002 | Son of the Beach | Main Crony | Episode: "The Long Hot Johnson" |
| 2004 | The West Wing | Cable Pundit | Episode: "The Dover Test" |
| 2005 | Las Vegas | Wally Ford | Episode: "For Sail by Owner" |
| 2005 | Boston Legal | Smith | Episode: "Gone" |
| 2005–2013 | The Office | Bob Vance | Recurring role; 24 episodes |
| 2006 | In Justice | Prison Guard | Episode: "Pilot" |
| 2008 | MANTIME with Fran and Ramis | Santa | Episode: "Christmas Special" |
| 2008 | The Young and the Restless | Howard Sullivan | Guest role, 1 episode |
| 2009 | Desperate Housewives | Supervisor | Episode: "The Coffee Cup" |
| 2010 | Cold Case | Nate 'Red Scare' Beecher '10 | Episode: "One Fall" |
| 2011 | How I Met Your Mother | Uncle Pete | Episode: "Last Words" |
| 2012 | The Life & Times of Tim | Rodney's Dad | Episode: "Strip Club Hostage Situation/Game Night" |
| 2012 | Pair of Kings | King Malakai | Episode: "The Evil King" |
| 2012 | Sherman's in Sanity | Vern Pfinger | 2 episodes |
| 2013 | The Silicon Assassin Project | | Episode: "The Medusa Meeting" |
| 2013 | The Bridge | Karl Millwright | Episode: "Pilot" |
| 2013 | Side Effects | Police Chief | Episode: "Pilot" |
| 2015 | The Messengers | Earl Cowen | Episode: "Why We Fight" |
| 2016 | Criminal Minds | Chief Arthur Emmett | Episode: "The Crimson King" |
| 2016-2017 | Adam Ruins Everything | Ray Murphy | Recurring role, 4 episodes |
| 2017 | A Girl Is a Gun | Van De Moortel | |
| 2018 | I'm a Man | Frank | Mini-series |
| 2025 | The Paper | Bob Vance | Episode: "Pilot" |
