= Wallace Potts =

American film director (1947 – 2006)

- Born: February 4, 1947; Birmingham, Alabama, U.S.
- Died: June 29, 2006 (aged 59); Los Angeles, California, U.S.
- Occupations: Film director; screenwriter; archivist
- Known for: Work for the Rudolf Nureyev Foundation
- Partner: Rudolf Nureyev

Wallace Potts (February 4, 1947 – June 29, 2006) was an American film director, screenwriter, and archivist. The former lover of ballet dancer Rudolf Nureyev, Potts was best known for his work as the research archivist for the Rudolf Nureyev Foundation from 1993 until his death in 2006. Potts accompanied Nureyev on his travels and filmed his working life on the road. During his years with Nureyev, Potts had opportunities to work in various capacities for such well-known film directors as Pier Paolo Pasolini, Mike Nichols, and James Bridges.

== Biography ==
=== Early life ===
Wallace Bean Potts was born on February 4, 1947, in Birmingham, Alabama, the son of Wallace and Ruth Potts. He grew up in the Crestline and Mountain Brook areas and was a member of Kobe fraternity at Shades Valley High School. He went on to attend Georgia Institute of Technology in Atlanta, where he was graduated summa cum laude with a bachelor's degree in physics.

=== Relationship with Rudolf Nureyev ===
In June 1969, Potts met Rudolf Nureyev in Atlanta, during a Royal Ballet tour of North America. Nureyev was an international star of the ballet renowned for his technical prowess. The two men were immediately attracted to each other and began an on-and-off relationship that lasted for the next six years. Potts described seeing Nureyev onstage as "like having sex again." "The wild animal that we had all heard about was magnificent. You have never witnessed anything like that, particularly in Atlanta."

A few hours after taking Nureyev to the airport, Potts received a call inviting him to spend a few days in Los Angeles. After returning to Atlanta, Potts applied to USC School of Cinematic Arts because he was interested in filmmaking. After being accepted, he and his friend Bronte "Myron" Woodward drove to California. In May 1970, he reconnected with Nureyev who was in New York. After spending a week with him in New York, Nureyev invited him to join him for three months in Europe. They settled into a stable domestic relationship. Potts stated that Nureyev, who had a reputation for having a fiery temper, had "mellowed, and I’d adjusted," finding ways to cope with his lover's demands and handling any outbursts with humor and indulgence. Additionally, Potts was able to defuse Rudolf's constant state of being "really wired" following a performance: "Half the time our sex was mechanical — more like a release for him — and he quite separated it from any feelings of tenderness or romance. Afterwards he used to read, and I would snuggle up until we fell asleep. He used to call me 'Boo-boo' [after the TV bear] because he liked the sound of it."

Potts, who had just missed getting drafted into the Vietnam War, returned to film school in Los Angeles at the end of the summer. Missing Nureyev, Potts dropped out of school a few months later to join him in London. With a 16-mm Aeroflex camera that Nuryev had purchased so that Potts could record his performances, Potts had begun working on a short film right away in an attempt to make up for having given up on his studies. Einstein's theory of relativity was explored through dancing in the movie, which featured three dancers of the Royal Ballet: Wayne Sleep, Vyvyan Lorrayne, and David Drew.

Potts parents were disappointed that he dropped out of film school, but they visited him in Europe. His life with Nuryev had become "a kind of marriage," giving the dancer the security and continuity he so desperately sought. Nureyev's promiscuity, however, caused problems in their relationship because Potts wanted to remain faithful. Nevertheless, Potts had a fling with actor Hiram Keller while in Rome in 1972. Potts returned to London after six weeks in Italy after Nureyev threatened to break up with him if he failed to return. Later that year, he abruptly left London and returned to Los Angeles to complete editing his Einstein film since he felt so consumed by Nuryev and distracted from his work.

In 1973, Potts joined Nureyev on the road while he was on tour. In 1975, Nureyev arranged for Potts to live with an acquaintance in New York. "He thought it would be more creative and stimulating than LA." That summer, Nureyev introduced Potts to the gay bathhouses in New York. Although he was reluctant at first, Potts understood that if he wanted to be with Nureyev, he would have to make accommodations. Potts contracted hepatitis during the Royal Ballet's visit, and all of the dancers in the company were required to receive gamma globulin shots since the infection can be fatal. Shortly after, when the couple were staying with a friend in Villefranche, Potts walked in on Nureyev having sex with a Frenchman. Potts stormed out and soon returned to New York, marking the end of their romantic relationship.

=== Film and archive career ===
In October 1971, Potts had toured England as a production assistant for Pier Paolo Pasolini's The Canterbury Tales. In 1972, he worked on a spaghetti Western film that Franco Rossellini was directing in Italy.

Potts was the assistant director of the 1972 Australian film version of the ballet Don Quixote, directed by Nureyev and Robert Helpmann, both of whom appeared in the film: Nureyev as the dashing barber Basilio and Helpmann in the critical title role. The ballerina in the role of Kitri was the effervescent Lucette Aldous. This was an exceptionally successful endeavor, bringing the excitement of live performance to a video screen. Many years later, Potts was the driving force behind the restoration of the film by the Australian Broadcasting Corporation in 1999 for use in several international tributes to Nureyev.

Potts worked as writer and director of the films Demi-Gods (1974), More, More, More (1976), Le Beau Mec (a.k.a. Dude, 1979), a gay erotic film shot in Paris, Tales of the Unliving and the Undead (1988), and Psycho Cop (1989).

In his last years, Potts was responsible for assembling, on behalf of the Rudolf Nureyev Foundation and the Foundation Rudolf Noureev, all film footage of the dance star. In putting the collection together, Potts built upon the library Nureyev had himself compiled. He added all the many 16mm films he had made of Nureyev rehearsing and performing, and he brought together every other known film and video from sources around the world. The result is an exhaustive record of Nureyev as dancer and man, now available in both the New York Public Library for the Performing Arts and in the Centre national de la danse in Paris.

=== Illness and death ===
Potts contracted the HIV infection that would ultimately kill him, as it did Nureyev in 1993, with whom he had maintained a love connection. After several years of battling lymphoma, Potts died on June 29, 2006, in a Los Angeles hospital. He was buried close to his parents in Montgomery, Alabama.
