= Scott Alan Smith =

American actor and academic

- Born: November 8, 1961 (age 64); New York City, New York, U.S.
- Education: George Mason University (BA); American Conservatory Theater (MFA)
- Occupations: Actor, academic

Scott Alan Smith (born November 8, 1961) is an American character actor and academic who is known for his roles in film, television and theatre.

== Background ==
Smith was born in New York City in 1961. He earned a Bachelor of Arts degree in English from George Mason University and a Master of Fine Arts from the American Conservatory Theater. In addition to his acting roles, Smith has also been a visiting professor of theatre at Pepperdine University and the Savannah College of Art and Design.

== Filmography ==
=== Film ===
Year	Title	Role	Notes
1994	Stargate	Officer	
1997	Mouse Hunt	Paramedic	
1998	The X-Files	Technician	
1999	Magnolia	E.R. Doctor	
2000	Rules of Engagement	Another Lawyer	
2000	Bounce	Jack	
2001	The Perfect Nanny	Conrad	
2005	Bewitched	Dinner Party Guest	Uncredited
2006	Déjà Vu	Trauma Doctor	
2008	Fling	Jeremy Levine	
2008	Shattered!	Narrator	Voice
2014	A Matter of Faith	Phil Jamison	
2016	The Curse of Sleeping Beauty	Billings	
2018	Vice	Intelligence Officer	

=== Television ===
Year	Title	Role	Notes
1992	Brooklyn Bridge	Bobby	Episode: "On the Road"
1992	Running Mates	Reporter A	Television film
1993	Caught in the Act	Michael	Television film
1994	A Time to Heal	Dr. Martin	Television film
1994	Amelia Earhart: The Final Flight	Reporter	Television film
1996	Race Against Time: The Search for Sarah	Sarah's doctor	Television film
1996	High Incident	Paramedic	2 episodes
1996	Apollo 11	Reporter #2	Television film
1997	The Pretender	Shore Patrol Officer	Episode: "Bazooka Jarod"
1997	Lois & Clark: The New Adventures of Superman	Suit #1	Episode: "Meet John Doe"
1997	Party of Five	Technician, #1	Episode: "Adjustments"
1998	Vengeance Unlimited	Associate	Episode: "Cruel and Unusual"
1998	Seven Days	Bomb Expert	Episode: "Doppleganger: Part 1"
1998	The X-Files	Prison Doctor	Episode: "Drive"
1999	7th Heaven	Man #1	Episode: "We the People"
1999	Time of Your Life	Lawyer	Episode: "The Time She Came to New York"
1999	Snoops	Atty. Richard Weeks	Episode: "Blood Lines"
2000	Felicity	Anesthesiologist	Episode: "Help for the Lovelorn"
2000	Zoe, Duncan, Jack and Jane	Ernie	Episode: "No Good Deed"
2000	Judging Amy	Colin Wright	Episode: "Culture Clash"
2000	The Jersey	Mr. Neil	Episode: "Elliot and Goliath"
2000	Trial by Media	Politician	Television film
2000	Star Trek: Voyager	Doyle	Episode: "Repression"
2001	The Practice	Doctor	Episode: "The Thin Line"
2001	Dharma & Greg	Waiter	Episode: "Educating Dharma: Part 2"
2001	Six Feet Under	Job Applicant #2	Episode: "The New Person"
2001	Boston Public	Michael Sardo	Episode: "Chapter Twenty-Five"
2001–2002	Philly	A.D.A. Jerry Bingham	10 episodes
2001, 2004	The Division	IA Officer / Dr. Raye	2 episodes
2002	Family Law	William Prince	Episode: "Once Removed"
2002	Alias	Chris Schmidt	Episode: "Trust Me"
2002	The District	Tracht	Episode: "Small Packages"
2003	DC 9/11: Time of Crisis	Ari Fleischer	Television film
2003	CSI: Crime Scene Investigation	Stuart Gardner	2 episodes
2004	The Handler	Roger Ledingham	Episode: "Give Daddy Some Sugar"
2004	Without a Trace	Walter Miller	Episode: "Wannabe"
2004	NYPD Blue	Defense Attorney Gimble / Richard Weeks	2 episodes
2004	JAG	Colonel Lawson	Episode: "Coming Home"
2004	Boston Legal	Dr. Randall	Episode: "Questionable Characters"
2005	Landslide	Jack Zane	Television film
2005	NCIS	Det. Mark Mauceri	Episode: "Pop Life"
2005	Halley's Comet	Father	Television film
2005	Cold Case	Henry Jones	Episode: "Strange Fruit"
2005, 2006	CSI: NY	Matthew Palmer / Marshall Palmer	2 episodes
2006	Big Love	Doctor	Episode: "Easter"
2006	Entourage	UTA Agent	Episode: "The Release"
2006	Justice	Frank Walsh	Episode: "Pilot"
2006	Veronica Mars	Roger Hearst	Episode: "Lord of the Pi's"
2007	House	Dr. Brady	Episode: "Guardian Angels"
2007	Chuck	Professor Fleming	Episode: "Chuck Versus the Alma Mater"
2007	The Closer	Geoffrey / Lawyer #3	3 episodes
2008	12 Miles of Bad Road	Dr. Heller	Episode: "Tremors"
2008	True Blood	Dr. Offutt	Episode: "Escape from Dragon House"
2008	Prison Break	Neurologist	Episode: "The Legend"
2008	Dirty Sexy Money	Financial Executive	Episode: "The Summer House"
2009	Lie to Me	Jeremy Levine	Episode: "Moral Waiver"
2009	The Young and the Restless	Dr. Lancaster / Dr. Jack Gannon	4 episodes
2009	Bones	Bruce Hanover	Episode: "The Critic in the Cabernet"
2009	Three Rivers	Dr. Craig Stevens	Episode: "Good Intentions"
2010	NCIS: Los Angeles	Connor Lavery	Episode: "The Bank Job"
2010	CSI: Miami	Doctor	Episode: "Backfire"
2010	Hung	Dermatologist	Episode: "Fat Off My Love or I'm the Allergen"
2011	Medium	Byron Knox	Episode: "Me Without You"
2011–2012	Private Practice	Therapist	21 episodes
2012	Sketchy	Dad	2 episodes
2013	Rizzoli & Isles	Dr. Thornton	Episode: "Cold as Ice"
2014	Revenge	Dr. Johnson	Episode: "Execution"
2014	Murder in the First	Dr. Shrake	Episode: "Pilot"
2015	State of Affairs	Eli Green	Episode: "The War at Home"
2015	The Fosters	Surgeon	Episode: "Not That Kind of Girl"
2015	American Horror Story: Hotel	Justice of the Peace	Episode: "She Wants Revenge"
2016	Supergirl	Chester Dunholtz	Episode: "Childish Things"
2016	Rosewood	Dr. Moore	Episode: "Negative Autopsies and New Partners"
2016	Scorpion	Doctor	Episode: "Ticker"
2016	Scandal	Governor Alden McKay	Episode: "That's My Girl"
2017	Switched at Birth	Leonard	Episode: "The Wolf Is Waiting"
2017	Shameless	Fox	Episode: "We Become What We... Frank!"
2018	Lethal Weapon	Manager Gus	Episode: "An Inconvenient Ruth"
2018	Bosch	Jacob Lamb	Episode: "Ask the Dust"
2019	Big Little Lies	Federal Prosecutor James Taylor	Episode: "Tell-Tale Hearts"
2019	For All Mankind	Dr. David Josephson	Episode: "Rupture"
2021	Them	Fuller	Episode: "Day 7: Morning"
