= Scott Terra =

American actor

- Born: Scott Weston Terra; June 25, 1987 (age 38); Connecticut, U.S.
- Occupation: Actor
- Years active: 1997—2010

Scott Weston Terra (born June 25, 1987) is an American former actor perhaps best known for his role as Mike Parker in the 2002 film Eight Legged Freaks and Young Matthew Murdock in the 2003 film Daredevil. Terra also played Sam Finney in Dickie Roberts: Former Child Star.

== Filmography ==
- Power Rangers Time Force (2001)-young boy
- Spin City (1996), episode "Miracle Near 34th Street" (aired Dec 17, 1997) - Justin
- One Zillion Valentines (1998), animated short film - voice of Milton
- Shadrach (1998) - Paul
- Beverly Hills, 90210 (1990), episode "I Wanna Reach Right Out and Grab Ya" (aired April 13, 1999) - Peter Foley
- Charmed (1999), episode "Out of Sight" (aired May 5, 1999) - David
- Touched by an Angel (1994), episode "The Occupant", (aired Oct 13, 1999) - Lonnie at 10
- The Perfect Nanny (2000) - Ben Lewis
- Going Home (2000) (TV) - Dylan
- Then Came You (2000), pilot episode "Then Came You" (aired March 22, 2000) - Small Boy
- Ground Zero (2000) - Justin Stevenson
- Strong Medicine (2000), episode "Dependency" (aired Oct 8, 2000) - David Tyrell
- 7th Heaven (1996), three episodes, aired in May 2000 & Feb 2001 - Bert Miller
- Motocrossed (2001) (TV) - Jason Carson
- The Sons of Mistletoe (2001) (TV) - Wylie Armstrong
- Providence (1999). episode "Shadow Play" (Jan 11, 2002) - Ethan O`Brien
- Redemption of the Ghost (2002) - Jack
- Eight Legged Freaks (2002) - Mike Parker
- Daredevil (2003) - young Matthew Murdock
- Dickie Roberts: Former Child Star (2003) - Sam Finney
- Notes from the Underbelly (2006)
