= In the Kingdom of the Blind, the Man with One Eye Is King =

- Directed by: Nick Vallelonga
- Written by: Nick Vallelonga
- Starring: Leo Rossi; William Petersen; Michael Biehn
- Music by: Jan Hammer
- Release date: 1995
- Running time: 99 minutes
- Country: United States
- Language: English

In the Kingdom of the Blind, the Man with One Eye Is King (also titled Kingdom of the Blind) is a 1995 American crime drama film written and directed by Nick Vallelonga and starring Leo Rossi, William Petersen, Michael Biehn and Vallelonga.

== Cast ==
- Nick Vallelonga as Al
- Michael Biehn as Jackie Ryan
- Leo Rossi as Moran
- William Petersen as Tony C.
- Paul Winfield as Papa Joe
- Kristian Alfonso as Jeanna

== Reception ==
Entertainment Weekly graded the film a C−.

TV Guide gave the film a negative review: "A crime drama that is as interminable (and as pretentious) as its title, IN THE KINGDOM OF THE BLIND, THE MAN WITH ONE EYE IS KING is ambitious in its themes--including family loyalty, betrayal, and redemption--but sadly lacking in quality."
