= The Sons of Mistletoe =

2001 television film directed by Steven Robman

- Written by: Darrah Cloud
- Directed by: Steven Robman
- Starring: Roma Downey; George Newbern; Scott Terra; Cathy Lee Crosby; Doris Roberts
- Composer: Lawrence Shragge
- Countries of origin: Canada; United States
- Original language: English

Production
- Executive producers: Howard Braunstein; Darrah Cloud; Roma Downey; Michael Jaffe; Tom Todoroff
- Producer: Randi Richmond
- Cinematography: Derick V. Underschultz
- Editor: Ron Spang
- Running time: 100 minutes
- Production companies: CBS Productions; Jaffe/Braunstein Films; Downey/Todoroff Productions; Pebblehut Productions

Original release
- Network: CBS
- Release: December 19, 2001

The Sons of Mistletoe is a Christmas drama television film that aired on CBS on December 19, 2001. A co-production of Canada and the United States, the film was directed by Steven Robman and written by Darrah Cloud. It stars Roma Downey, George Newbern, Scott Terra, Cathy Lee Crosby, and Doris Roberts.

== Plot ==
A cold businesswoman threatens to close a boys foster home during the holidays when she returns to her home town to settle her late father's estate.

== Cast ==
- Roma Downey as Helen Radke
- George Newbern as Jimmy Adams
- Scott Terra as Wylie Armstrong
- Cathy Lee Crosby as Mary
- Doris Roberts as Margie
- Adam Schurman as Benny
- Mathew Peart as Howard
- Kit Weyman as Evan
- Austin Di Iulio as Alex
- Kyle Kass as Miguel
- Dylan Rosenthal as Victor
- Jack Jessop as Floyd

== Awards and nominations ==
Year	Award	Category	Nominee	Result	Ref.
2002	23rd Young Artist Awards	Best Performance in a TV Movie (Comedy or Drama): Young Actor Age 10 or Under	Adam Schurman	Nominated	

== See also ==
- List of Christmas films
