= Kristian Alfonso =

American actress (born 1963)

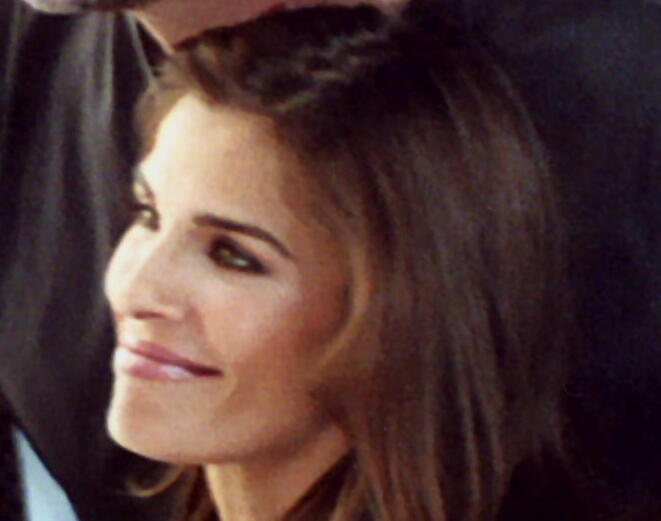
- Alfonso in 2004
- Born: Kristian-Joy Alfonso; September 5, 1963 (age 62); Brockton, Massachusetts, U.S.
- Occupations: Actress; model
- Years active: 1977–present
- Spouses: Simon Macauley (m. 1987; div. 1991) Danny Daggenhurst (m. 2001)
- Children: 2
- Website: www.kristianonline.com

Kristian-Joy Alfonso (born September 5, 1963) is an American actress and fashion model. She is best known for playing the role of Hope Williams Brady on the NBC soap opera Days of Our Lives (1983 to 1987, 1990, 1994 to 2020, return appearances from 2023 to present). She was nominated for a Daytime Emmy Award for Outstanding Younger Actress (then known as Outstanding Ingénue) in 1985 for her role on Days. Alfonso also played Pilar Ortega on Falcon Crest (1988 to 1990) and Lauren Ethridge on Melrose Place (1993 to 1994).

== Early life ==
Alfonso was born in Brockton, Massachusetts. Her grandparents hailed from Sicily and Calabria, giving her full Italian heritage. She has one sibling, an older sister. As a teenager, she was an above-average student. Her extra-curricular activities were focused on ice skating and dance classes. Alfonso won the gold medal in a figure skating championship when she was thirteen years old. After injuring her leg in a tobogganing accident, she had to give up skating and dancing. Alfonso soon received opportunities that led to a modeling career and eventually acting. She graduated from Brockton High School in 1982.

== Career ==
=== 1977–1981: Early work ===
After her skating career ended, Alfonso was signed to Wilhelmina Models. By the time she was fifteen, she had appeared on the covers of 30 international magazines, including Vogue and Harper's Bazaar. She appeared on the cover of Seventeen in 1979. Alfonso considered herself lucky to be working as a model because she stands at only 5 feet 4 inch tall. She sometimes had to stand on apple boxes to appear taller.

Alfonso's modeling work gained attention from NBC and she received her first acting role. She was cast as Kelly Blake in the television film The Star Maker (1981), co-starring with Rock Hudson. She was asked to audition for the role of Hope Williams on the NBC soap opera Days of Our Lives, but she declined because she didn't want to move to Los Angeles.

=== 1983–1986: Days of Our Lives ===
In 1983, Alfonso had another opportunity to audition for the role of Hope on Days of Our Lives and she took it. During her screen test, she tripped and fell down the staircase at the Horton house. The producers were charmed by her clumsiness and she was signed to a contract. Alfonso was the fifth actress to play Hope. The role had previously been played by Tammy Taylor in 1981. Alfonso's first air date was April 14, 1983.

The character of Hope Williams was paired with Bo Brady (played by Peter Reckell). Soap Opera Digest said the love story was "classic in its origins and continues to make people melt: gruff boy from the wrong side of the tracks...tames the spoiled rich girl who was getting into all sorts of trouble."

Alfonso won a Soap Opera Digest Award for Exciting Female Newcomer for her role on Days in 1984. She was nominated for a Daytime Emmy Award for Outstanding Younger Actress (then known as Outstanding Ingénue) in 1985. She also received Young Artist Award nominations in 1983, 1984, and 1985.

In 1985, Alfonso guest starred on Amazing Stories. In 1986, she and Peter Reckell received a Soap Opera Digest Award nomination for Favorite Daytime Super Couple.

=== 1987–1994: Other work ===
Alfonso and Peter Reckell decided to leave Days of Our Lives, last airing in April 1987. The characters of Bo and Hope left Salem to sail around the world with their son, Shawn. After leaving Days, Alfonso made guest appearances on Who's the Boss? and Murder, She Wrote. She played Cassandra in the television film Out of Time (1988). From 1988 to 1989, she had recurring roles on MacGyver and Full House.

In 1988, Alfonso joined the cast of the CBS series Falcon Crest, playing Pilar Ortega. In April 1990, it was announced that she would return to Days of Our Lives for a few months during a hiatus from Falcon Crest. Since Peter Reckell was able to make a long term return to Days and Alfonso wasn't, the character of Hope was killed off.

Alfonso co-starred with Dolph Lundgren in the film Joshua Tree (also titled Army of One) (1993). She had a recurring role on Baywatch. From 1993 to 1994, Alfonso played the recurring role of Lauren Ethridge, a Hollywood madam, on Melrose Place. She guest starred on Burke's Law. Alfonso played Chris Madigan in the television film Blindfold: Acts of Obsession (1994). She was considered to play figure skater Nancy Kerrigan in a television film.

=== 1994–2009: Days return ===
Alfonso returned to Days of Our Lives, first airing May 6, 1994. She signed a long-term contract with the show. She received a Soap Opera Digest Award nomination in 1996 for Hottest Actress for her role on Days. She played Jeanna in the film In the Kingdom of the Blind, the Man with One Eye Is King. In 1997, Alfonso played Chelsea Coals in the television film What Happened to Bobby Earl? She also appeared in the television film Steve.Oedekerk.com.

In 1999, she won a Soap Opera Digest Award for Hottest Female Star for her role on Days of Our Lives. In 2000, she played her Days character, Hope Brady, on an episode of Friends. She also played Hope in the primetime special Days of Our Lives' 35th Anniversary. In 2000, Alfonso received a Soap Opera Digest Award nomination for Favorite Actress. In 2001, Alfonso and Peter Reckell won a Soap Opera Digest Award for Favorite Couple. In 2002, they won a special Daytime Emmy Award, voted on by fans, for America's Favorite Couple.

Alfonso played Mary Everly in the film Day of Redemption (2004). She and Peter Reckell were nominated for a Daytime Emmy Award in 2005, voted on by fans, for Most Irresistible Combination. She guest starred with Reckell, playing their Days characters, on an episode of 30 Rock in 2009.

=== 2019–present ===
In November 2019, it was announced that the entire cast of Days of Our Lives had been released from their contracts. The show was put on an indefinite hiatus. In January 2020, the show was renewed for season 56. Alfonso returned as Hope in February 2020. Days suspended filming in mid-March 2020 because of the COVID-19 pandemic. In July 2020, Alfonso announced that she wouldn't be returning to the show when it resumed production in September. In a statement, she said, "It is now time for me to write my next chapter."

In October 2020, it was announced that Alfonso would join her former Days co-star Alison Sweeney in the Hallmark Channel film Chronicle Mysteries. In 2021, she joined the cast of Lifetime's four-movie V. C. Andrews event, appearing in the episodes All That Glitters and Hidden Jewel. In July 2022, Alfonso returned to the role of Hope Brady in Days of Our Lives: Beyond Salem, a spinoff series streaming on Peacock. In 2023, she returned to Days of Our Lives for a short time, along with her former co-stars Peter Reckell and Victoria Konefal. In April 2024, it was announced that Alfonso would make a brief return to Days for the funeral of Doug Williams (Bill Hayes), airing November 29.

== Personal life ==
Alfonso married Simon Macauley, a realtor, in 1987. They had a long distance marriage, with Macauley based in Sint Maarten and Alfonso working in Los Angeles. Their son was born in October 1990. They divorced in 1991.

She married Danny Daggenhurst on October 6, 2001. He is an attorney and chairman of a palm oil company in Bangkok. Their son was born in July 2002. Alfonso also has a stepson from Daggenhurst's previous marriage.

In November 2006, she created her own jewelry line called Hope Faith Miracles and a fashion line, Hope by Kristian Alfonso. In 2016, she announced the company had been purchased, and she was no longer involved.

== Filmography ==
=== Film ===
Year	Title	Role	Notes
1993	Joshua Tree	Rita Marek	
1995	In the Kingdom of the Blind, the Man with One Eye Is King	Jeanna	
2004	Day of Redemption	Mary Everly	
2019	Cool Cat's Crazy Dream	Dream World Kristian	Video

=== Television ===
Year	Title	Role	Notes
1981	The Star Maker	Kelly Blake	Television film
1983–1987; 1990; 1994–2020; 2023, 2024	Days of Our Lives	Hope Williams Brady	Contract role (1983–1987; 1994–2020); Recurring role (1990; 2023; 2024)
1985	Amazing Stories		Episode: "Remote Control Man"
1987	Who's the Boss?	Frankie	Episode: "Frankie and Tony Are Lovers"
1988	Murder, She Wrote	Michele Gambini	Episode: "A Very Good Year for Murder"
1988	Out of Time	Cassandra Barber	Television film
1988; 1989	MacGyver	Deborah	2 episodes
1988; 1989	Full House	Judge; Robin Winslow	2 episodes
1988–1990	Falcon Crest	Pilar Ortega Cumson	Series regular 44 episodes
1993	Baywatch	Debra Harris	2 episodes
1993–1994	Melrose Place	Lauren Ethridge	Recurring role 7 episodes
1994	Burke's Law	Susan Bell	Episode: "Who Killed the Legal Eagle?"
1994	Blindfold: Acts of Obsession	Chris Madigan	Television film
1997	What Happened to Bobby Earl?	Chelsea Coals	Television film
1997	Steve.Oedekerk.com	Lisa	Television film
2000	Friends	Hope Brady	Episode: "The One That Could Have Been: Part 1"
2000	Days of Our Lives' 35th Anniversary	Hope Williams Brady	Television film
2003	Secret Lives	Host	
2009	30 Rock	Hope Brady	Episode: "Dealbreakers Talk Show No. 0001"
2021	The Chronicle Mysteries	Sheriff Williams	Television miniseries
2021	V.C. Andrews' Landry Family	Gladys	2 episodes
2022	Days of Our Lives: Beyond Salem	Hope Williams Brady	Television miniseries 5 episodes

== Awards and nominations ==
Year	Award	Category	Title	Result	Ref.
1982–1983	Young Artist Award	Best Young Actress in a Daytime Soap	Days of Our Lives	Nominated	
1983–1984	Young Artist Award	Best Young Actress in a Daytime or Nighttime Television Series	Days of Our Lives	Nominated	
1984–1985	Young Artist Award	Outstanding Young Actress - Regular Daytime Serial	Days of Our Lives	Nominated	
1984	Soap Opera Digest Award	Exciting Female Newcomer	Days of Our Lives	Won	
1985	Daytime Emmy Award	Outstanding Younger Actress in a Drama Series	Days of Our Lives	Nominated	
1986	Soap Opera Digest Award	Favorite Daytime Super Couple (shared with Peter Reckell)	Days of Our Lives	Nominated	
1996	Soap Opera Digest Award	Hottest Actress	Days of Our Lives	Nominated	
1999	Soap Opera Digest Award	Hottest Female Star	Days of Our Lives	Won	
2000	Soap Opera Digest Award	Favorite Actress	Days of Our Lives	Nominated	
2001	Soap Opera Digest Award	Favorite Couple (shared with Peter Reckell)	Days of Our Lives	Won	
2002	Daytime Emmy Award	America's Favorite Couple (voted on by fans, shared with Peter Reckell)	Days of Our Lives	Won	
2005	Daytime Emmy Award	Most Irresistable Combination (voted on by fans, shared with Peter Reckell)	Days of Our Lives	Nominated	

== See also ==
- Hope Williams Brady
- Bo Brady and Hope Williams
- Supercouple
