= Psycho Cop 2 =

- VHS cover art
- Directed by: Adam Rifkin
- Screenplay by: Dan Povenmire
- Produced by: David Andriole
- Starring: Dave Bean; Barbara Niven; Julie Strain; John Paxton; Miles Dougal; Justin Carroll; Rod Sweitzer; Nick Vallelonga; Robert R. Shafer
- Cinematography: Adam Kane
- Edited by: William G. Bernard
- Music by: George Andrian; Marc David Decker
- Production companies: Film Nouveau; Penn-Eden West Pictures Inc.
- Distributed by: Columbia TriStar Home Video
- Release date: November 8, 1993 (Germany)
- Running time: 85 minutes
- Country: United States
- Language: English

Psycho Cop 2 (also known as Psycho Cop Returns) is a 1993 American slasher film directed by Adam Rifkin, and written by Dan Povenmire. It is the sequel to the 1989 film Psycho Cop.

In the film, a serial killer is party crashing at a bachelor party, and proceeds to attack both the guests and the strippers attending the party.

== Plot ==
In a coffeehouse, Officer Joe Vickers, a serial killer empowered by Satan, overhears Brian and Larry, a pair of white-collar workers, discussing a bachelor party that they are planning to throw in their workplace for their friend Gary. Vickers follows the two to their office, and stakes it out in his car (which is full of body parts and demonic imagery) until after hours, which is when Larry bribes the security guard into letting in three strippers. Vickers tricks the guard into letting him in, then stabs him in the eye with a pencil.

Vickers sabotages the lifts, and when Mike goes downstairs to tell the night watchman about it, Vickers throws him down an elevator shaft. Vickers proceeds to send vaguely threatening faxes to the partiers, though this does not deter the drunken Gary from going up onto the roof with one of the strippers. The two are found by Vickers, who shoots Gary in the head, and throws the stripper off of the building. Vickers continues to send faxes, prompting Brian, Larry, and the remaining two strippers to go to the copy room, while elsewhere Vickers uses a decorative spear to impale a pair of workers who were having sex in a storage closet.

Larry, Brian, and the strippers flee when Mike and Gary's bodies fall through the ceiling of the copy room, and run into Sharon, an accountant who had stayed late. The quintet try to call 911, but the lines are not working, and while looking around to see if anyone else is in the building, they find the skewered couple, and are confronted by Vickers. Initially feigning being there to help, Vickers shoots Larry in the mouth, wounds Brian, and chases the others. The women try to escape through the front entrance, but the door is shatterproof, and handcuffed shut. While the trio make their way up to the garage exit, they are attacked by Vickers, who shoots one stripper, and snaps the neck of the other. Sharon is pursued by Vickers, but manages to set his face on fire (causing one of his sunglasses lenses to melt to his eye) and knock him down an elevator shaft, but he survives the fall.

Sharon makes it out through the garage, and is chased through the streets by Vickers, who catches her outside a bar. The patrons of the bar see Vickers attacking Sharon, and in a parody of the Rodney King incident, they beat down the officer as a bystander videotapes the scene from his apartment balcony. Sharon, Brian, and Vickers are all taken to a hospital, where Vickers is healed by demonic forces, massacres the police officers and medical staff watching him, and storms out of his room.

== Cast ==
- Robert R. Shafer as Officer Joe Vickers / Gary Henley / Ted Warnicky
- Barbara Niven as Sharon Wells (credited as Barbara Lee Alexander)
- Rod Sweitzer as Lawrence
- Miles Dougal as Brian
- Nick Vallelonga as Michael
- Dave Bean as Gary
- John Paxton as Frederick Stonecipher
- Julie Strain as Stephanie
- Melanie Good as Cindy
- Priscilla Huckleberry as Lisa
- Justin Carroll as Tony Michaels
- Carol Cummings as Chloe Wilson
- Al Schuermann as Gus
- David Andriole as Vinnie, The Bartender
- Adam Rifkin as Man With Video Camera

== Production ==
Writer Dan Povenmire was offered the chance to direct the film, but as this would require him to quit his job working on The Simpsons, he declined.

== Home media ==
The film was released on DVD by Ardustry Home Entertainment in 2005 in an edited version that removed most of the violent and sexual content. On April 25, 2017, the film was restored and released on DVD and Blu-ray by Vinegar Syndrome.
