= Robert Tracy (dancer) =

American dancer and writer (1955–2007)

Robert Tracy (1955 – June 7, 2007) was an American dancer, writer, and educator in New York City. He taught dance history as an associate professor at Fordham University and published well-reviewed books. During his life, he was better known for his literary work, but he was a trained dancer. Tracy was the personal assistant to his companion, ballet dancer Rudolf Nureyev. After Nureyev's death in 1993, Tracy dedicated his life to AIDS awareness and LGBT legal advocacy.

== Biography ==
=== Early life and education ===
Robert Tracy was born in Boston, in 1955, the son of an English teacher. He grew up in a culturally dynamic home in Massachusetts. Tracy initially earned a bachelor's degree in performing arts, classical studies and dance from Skidmore College. Upon graduation, he attended studies in Greek and Latin, as well as classical ballet dance at New York University, where he was encouraged to train as a professional dancer. He was eventually accepted at the George Balanchine's School of American Ballet, and in 1979, he was one of a few students hand-picked by Balanchine to perform in Le Bourgeois Gentilhomme, a work the Russian-born choreographer created for Nureyev.

=== Relationship with Rudolf Nureyev ===
In 1979, when Tracy was 23 years old, he met Nureyev in New York City, and they became lovers for two and a half years. Tracey moved into Nureyev's New York apartment at the Dakota. Nureyev employed Tracy as his personal assistant and production coordinator when working out of New York and Paris, while Tracy kept his job teaching dance history at Fordham University.

Tracy and Nureyev had open relationship and remained companions after their sexual relationship ended. They entertained the idea of becoming parents and Nureyev had plans to father a child with Nastassja Kinski, a plan that never materialized.

In 1983, Tracy and Nureyev both tested positive for HIV/AIDS. By 1991, their relationship had deteriorated and according to friends, Nureyev wanted Tracy to move out of his apartment at the Dakota. While witnessing the execution of Nureyev's will in April 1992, Tracy observed that no provisions had been made for him. Shortly after, Tracy hired renowned palimony attorney Marvin Mitchelson to negotiate a settlement with Nureyev because he had no reliable source of money and was concerned about his own health. "I hired Mitchelson to protect me, because I wasn't being protected," Tracy said. Although he continued to reside at the Dakota, Nureyev's attorney, Barry Weinstein, sent him three eviction notices the week before Nureyev died.

Following Nureyev's death, his fortune, estimated at US$33 million at the time, was transferred by his lawyer to his Ballet Promotion Foundation, which was named after him. Eventually, under a legal agreement with the foundation, which recognized Tracy's entitlement to some security for their long-term relationship, he received $600,000, paid in small installments with the condition that he could not talk publicly about their relationship, write a book, or sell this information to the media during his lifetime.

=== Writing career ===
In 1983, his first book, Balanchine's Ballerinas: Conversations With the Muses, was published by Simon & Schuster; described by The Wall Street Journal as "this year's great ballet book."

Subsequent books included Goddess: Martha Graham's Dancers Remember (1997) and Ailey Spirit: The Journey of an American Dance Company (2004), both published by Limelight.

Tracy reportedly worked as an editor. He edited Nigel Gosling's Prowling the Pavements: Selected Writings From London, 1950-1980 (Winchell, 1986) and contributed to Isamu Noguchi's 1994 anthology Essays and Conversations and to the International Encyclopedia of Dance. The main focus of his writing was on dance, theater, music, art and film creating magnificent reports and articles for main newspapers and magazines, including The New York Times, Vanity Fair, Dance, Elle, and Vogue.

=== Death ===
On June 7, 2007, Tracy died from complications of AIDS; upon his death the information was revealed by The New York Times with the legal consent of the Nureyev Foundation.
