= Choker (film) =

- 2006 DVD cover
- Directed by: Nick Vallelonga
- Written by: Nick Vallelonga
- Produced by: Geza Decsy; James Quattrochi; Nick Vallelonga
- Starring: Paul Sloan; Colleen Porch; Hayley DuMond; Anthony John Denison; Robert R. Shafer; Katrina Law; Jesse Corti
- Cinematography: Vladimir Van Maule
- Edited by: David Risotto
- Music by: Harry Manfredini
- Distributed by: MTI Home Video
- Release dates: March 19, 2005 (Other Venice Film Festival)
- Running time: 95 minutes
- Country: United States
- Language: English
- Budget: $35,000

Choker is a 2005 American science fiction action horror film written and directed by Nick Vallelonga and starring Paul Sloan, Colleen Porch, Hayley DuMond, Anthony John Denison, Robert R. Shafer, Katrina Law, and Jesse Corti. The film premiered on March 19, 2005, at the Other Venice Film Festival and was released under the title Disturbance on DVD by MTI Home Video in October 2006.

== Plot ==
Hud Masters (Paul Sloan) is recruited by a specialized agency to track and eliminate a viral alien race. He is partnered with Logan (Colleen Porch) to execute the mission, and pair must navigate a city-wide infestation to locate the alien leader (Hayley Dumond). throughout the operation, Masters struggles with internal conflict as he attempts to suppress his inherent violent tendencies and avoid reverting to his former nature.

== Cast ==
- Paul Sloan as Hud Masters
- Colleen Porch as Logan
- Hayley DuMond as Leader
- Anthony John Denison as Lt. Murcer
- Robert R. Shafer as Lt. Clark
- Katrina Law as Santo
- Jesse Corti as Mr. Carter
- Kimberly Estrada as Kat
- Ella Thomas as Godiva
- Nina Kaczorowski as Nina
- Nick Vallelonga as Frank Russo
- James Quattrochi as Detective Rourke
- Susse Budde as Stacy Russo
- Paula Miranda as Kitten
- Arthur Lupetti as John
- Timon Kyle as Willis the Pimp
- Adrienne Janic as Gorgeous Brunette

== Production ==
The film was shot on locations in Los Angeles, California, and was completed over a twelve-day schedule. Notably, the roles of the "Leader" and the "Coroner" were originally played for male actors; however, they were ultimately recast and performed by actresses Haley Dumond and Katrina Law, respectively.

== Critical response ==
Critical reception for Disturbance (originally titled Choker) was divided, with reviewers often contrasting its high-end visual style against its low-budget constraints.

JoBlo provided a largely positive assessment, describing director Nick Vallelonga's work as a "colorful, stylishly shot, tightly paced and overall vibrant effort." The review commended film editor David Risotto for the film's "free flowing feel" and Harry Manfredini for an "exciting and pulse pounding" film score. The performances were also noted as highlight; the publication described Paul Sloan as "magnetic and convincing," Colleen Porch as delivering an "impeccable" emotional performance, and Hayley DuMond as providing the necessary "intensity, focus and menace." While noting that the fight choreography could have been improved, JoBlo concluded that the film was an "ingeniously written mish-mash of horror, action and Sci-Fi".

Conversely, DVD Reviews offered a more measured critique, characterizing the film as "standard stuff" that frequently relied on genre clichés. While the reviewer acknowledged that the "arresting visuals and a better-than-average cast" elevated the project above typical low-budget fare, they argued the film remained "immersed in triteness." The publication specifically criticized the action sequences and fight choreography as "substandard" and suggested that "pretentious visual manipulation" hindered several scenes. Ultimately, the review concluded that despite the "visual splendor and appealing performers," the film failed to transcend its "direct-to-video status."

Film Critics United remarked on the film's thematic uniqueness, specifically noting the "unambitious" nature of the alien protagonists who sought survival rather than world domination. The reviewer observed that although the story was "a bit derivative," Vallelonga's commitment to the project and his casting of Paul Sloan brought "a little extra to the table." Despite noting that the production was rough around the edges," the publication found the film possessed a "certain amount of charm" and evident creative effort.

Chad Clinton Freeman, writing for PollyStaffle.com, evaluated the film as a successful example of low-budget film. Freeman highlighted the "great audio and visuals" and the film's noir-inspired atmosphere. He argued that the lack of traditional hero and the refusal to adhere to a single subgenera were effective, intentional choices by Vallelonga. Freeman's analysis concluded that the film's strength lay in its ensemble nature and the director's "subtle references to other films.

== Release ==
The film screened at various film festivals in 2005 before being picked up by MTI Home Video for release in 2006, when it was released on DVD in the United States under the title Disturbance and in the United Kingdom as B.E.I.N.G..
