= A Time to Heal (film) =

- Genre: Drama
- Written by: Cathleen Young
- Directed by: Michael Toshiyuki Uno
- Starring: Nicollette Sheridan; Gary Cole; Mara Wilson
- Music by: Jay Gruska
- Country of origin: United States
- Original language: English

Production
- Producers: Susan Baerwald; Lewis Abel
- Cinematography: Newton Thomas Sigel
- Editor: David A. Simmons
- Running time: 90 minutes
- Production companies: NBC Productions; Susan Baerwald Productions

Original release
- Network: NBC
- Release: April 18, 1994

A Time to Heal is a 1994 American drama television film starring Nicollette Sheridan, Gary Cole and Mara Wilson. It was directed by Michael Toshiyuki Uno.

== Plot ==
A mother that has been paralyzed from a stroke during childbirth recovers with the help of her husband.

== Cast ==
- Nicollette Sheridan as Jenny Barton
- Gary Cole as Jay Barton
- Mara Wilson as Barbara Barton
- Annie Corley as Michelle Rogers
- Ken Jenkins as Don Peterson
- Ben Masters as Dr. Klein
- Tim Ransom as Mitch Barton
- Lorraine Toussaint as Zelda
- Doris Roberts as Maddy
- Bryan Clark as Mr. Barton
- Toni Sawyer as Mrs. Barton
- Scott Alan Smith as Dr. Martin
- Trisha Simmons as Nurse Johnson
- Wesley Hayashi as Burt
- Sarah Freeman as Sandra
- Lauren Kopit as Beth
