= Cindy Guyer =

American model, producer, actress and restaurateur

- Born: February 9, 1965 (age 61); Stamford, Connecticut, U.S.A.
- Occupations: Model, actress, and businesswoman
- Website: http://www.cindyguyer.com deadlink

Cindy Guyer is an American model, producer, actress and restaurateur from Stamford, Connecticut.

== Modeling career ==
Discovered by Wilhelmina International Inc. (Wilhelmina Models) at the age of 14, Guyer went on to become the most prolific model to be featured on romance novels. She has appeared on hundreds of covers, which earned her the nickname "Miss Romance". The commercial print model and celebrity Playmate was featured in a tribute pictorial in Playboy magazine for her contribution to this popular genre of fiction literature and millions of book sold worldwide.

== Acting career ==
Since opening Guyer's, an eatery and bar named after her father on Manhattan‘s Upper Westside, Guyer has also made occasional television appearances on reality programs, including The Real Housewives of New York City and the Millionaire Matchmaker.

Guyer was cast in the game-show/reality television series Mr. Romance, which was her debut role in non-scripted programming.

== Personal life ==
Guyer was briefly engaged to actor Corey Haim in 2000. Haim proposed to Guyer two days after they met at a Chicago autograph show. Guyer spoke out about Haim's obsessive behaviour after he allegedly threw her against a car, leaving her needing stitches on her chin. Haim reportedly wept afterwards as he apologized. "I saw a sweet little person in there that really needed help," said Guyer. Fearing his volatile mood swings, she paid to book him into the Betty Ford Center, but Haim left after eight days and their relationship soon disintegrated.

== Film and television appearances ==
- Jack's Back (1988) as Neighbor
- Warm Summer Rain (1989) as Nurse 1
- Psycho Cop (1989) (as Cynthia Guyer) as Julie
- Cool Blue (1990) as Girl in Gallery
- Soldier's Fortune (1991) (as Cynthia Guyer) as Jennifer
- Space Ghost Coast to Coast (1994) as herself (1 episode – "Punch")
- The Mirror Has Two Faces (1996) as Taxi Stealer
- Summer of Fun (1997)
- Martial Law (1998) as Bunny (1 episode – "Lock-Up")
- Hit and Runway (1999) as Model Hostage
- The Perfect Nanny (2001) as Mandy
- The Millionaire Matchmaker (Herself)
