= The Perfect Nanny (film) =

American television film

- Genre: Thriller; Psychological thriller
- Written by: Mark Castaldo; Victor H. Schiller; Christine Conradt; Richard Gilbert Hill
- Directed by: Robert Malenfant
- Starring: Tracy Nelson; Bruce Boxleitner; Dana Barron; Scott Terra; Darren Gray Ward; Cindy Guyer; Scott Alan Smith; Susan Blakely; Katherine Helmond
- Music by: Richard Bowers
- Country of origin: United States
- Original language: English

Production
- Executive producers: Larry Gershman; Anita Gershman
- Producer: Pierre David
- Production locations: Linda Vista Community Hospital, 610-30 South St. Louis Street, Los Angeles, California
- Cinematography: Don E. FauntLeRoy
- Editors: Robert Pergament; Gregg London
- Running time: 91 minutes
- Production companies: Happy Home Productions; World International Network Inc. (distributor)

Original release
- Release: March 16, 2001

The Perfect Nanny is a 2001 American psychological thriller television film directed by Robert Malenfant. It stars Tracy Nelson, Bruce Boxleitner, Dana Barron and Katherine Helmond. It centers on a mentally disturbed woman who becomes obsessed with a man, and assumes a hidden identity in order to apply for the position of a nanny in his home, while she is ultimately determined to be his wife.

The film marks the second collaboration between Malenfant and Tracy Nelson, the first being the 1998 film The Night Caller, in which Nelson played a similar role.

== Plot ==
Andrea McBride discovers her husband in bed with another woman and attempts suicide by stabbing herself. Upon her release from a psychiatric hospital, Andrea decides to start fresh. While working for a nanny agency, Andrea comes across a client, widower, Dr. James Lewis, who is in need of a nanny. Driven by her fascination of romance novels, particularly "The Passion of Mandy", she applies for the job in an attempt to marry James, a similar theme which takes place in her favorite book. Under a new persona and a new physical appearance, Andrea becomes Nikki Harcourt, as she is told that she bears a strong resemblance to a woman of the same name who used to work with the agency, but has since relocated to Paris.

Nikki is initially rejected for the position, until she kills the successful applicant, Beth O'Reilly, and suddenly moves into the Lewis household, where she is welcomed by the family, including James's teenage daughter, Fawn, and son, Ben. Nikki, as well as Fawn, becomes jealous of James's relationship with colleague, Dr. Julia Bruning, forcing Nikki to resort to self-harm as a means of drawing James's attention away from Julia. Nikki then tries to convince Fawn that Julia is having an affair with another colleague, which turns out to be untrue. Nikki makes a desperate bid to have James for herself by murdering Julia, prompting Fawn to become suspicious of Nikki's intentions.

Nikki's husband, Troy, begins to enquire into her whereabouts, and asks for her estranged mother's help. Fawn continues to keep a watchful eye on Nikki, and when she finds Nikki going through her deceased mother's clothes, she expresses her concern to James, whom she believes Nikki has fallen in love with, which he dismisses. Upon overhearing that James's job could be in jeopardy, Nikki takes matters into her own hands by stabbing a hospital staff member, Conrad, to death, which saves James's position at the hospital.

James makes preparations for Nikki's upcoming birthday, and she sees to it that it will just be the two of them for the evening. Meanwhile, Troy finds Nikki and attempts to kidnap her, before she manages to kill him. Fawn decides to do some investigating on Nikki, beginning with a library ticket she found in one of her books, with the name Andrea McBride printed. She locates Andrea's address, while Mrs. McBride claims not to recognise "Nikki" from a photograph shown by Fawn. Fawn later gains entry to Mrs. McBride's home and discovers that Andrea and Nikki are one and the same.

Mrs. McBride goes to the Lewis household and confronts Nikki, revealing that she is aware that she killed Troy, and blackmails her into making continuous payments to her, otherwise she'll see that Nikki is sent back to the psychiatric hospital. Nikki stabs her to death and tries to go on with her evening as normal. When James rejects Nikki's advances, she attacks him and ties him up. Fawn returns home and Nikki attempts to kill her, before a fight erupts. James breaks free, just as Nikki tries to stab Fawn, and sympathetically reasons with her, before she gives up her weapon. Some time later, she is securely locked away in the psychiatric hospital, where she writes out wedding invitations, believing that she and James are getting married.

== Cast ==
- Tracy Nelson as Nikki Harcourt/Andrea McBride
- Bruce Boxleitner as Dr. James Lewis
- Dana Barron as Fawn Lewis
- Scott Terra as Ben Lewis
- Susan Blakely as Dr. Julia Bruning
- Katherine Helmond as Mrs. McBride
- Darren Gray Ward as Troy Hatfield
- Cindy Guyer as Mandy
- Amy Stock-Poynton as Beth O'Reilly
- Sara Van Horn as Nurse Thelma
- Scott Alan Smith as Conrad
- David Sederholm as Handsome Man
- Joyce Fessides as Doris
- Charles O'Glenn as Dr. Tanner Wallace
- Christopher Kriesa as Librarian
- Sherrie Rose as Rosalee

== Reception ==
The Perfect Nanny had received a mixed critical reception. In a review for the website The Movie Scene, it was rated at 3 out of 5 stars, while it was pointed out that the film adheres to the usual cliches seen in a Lifetime movie, and that the film is "simply a formula driven TV movie". However, praise was given for it good casting, particularly Tracy Nelson and Bruce Boxleitner. It was stated that "Tracy Nelson who does a nice job of bringing out her character's paranoia and unsettled nature which makes her dangerous whilst a little over the top. As such Nelson makes for an entertaining psycho which is what the movie really calls for." Finally, it was said that "What this all boils down to is that "The Perfect Nanny" is just your routine delusionally obsessed young woman drama where she is capable of killing to try and get her way. It does mean that it is predictable yet thanks to Nelson as well as Boxleitner it is also entertaining."

In a review for science-fiction, horror and fantasy reviews website Moira, the film was rated at 3 stars, and again criticised for its predictable plot line and storytelling, and that "The Perfect Nanny never quite scales the same heights that The Landlady did but is better than average among [Pierre] David’s psycho-thrillers." On a more positive note, Robert Malenfant was acknowledged for his direction: "Rob Malenfant manages to conduct a reasonable degree of tension and some fair surprises," while the cast were praised for their performances.

== Home media ==
The Perfect Nanny was released on DVD via York Entertainment on August 14, 2001.
