= That's Amore Italian Cafe =

Italian restaurant in Seattle, Washington, U.S.

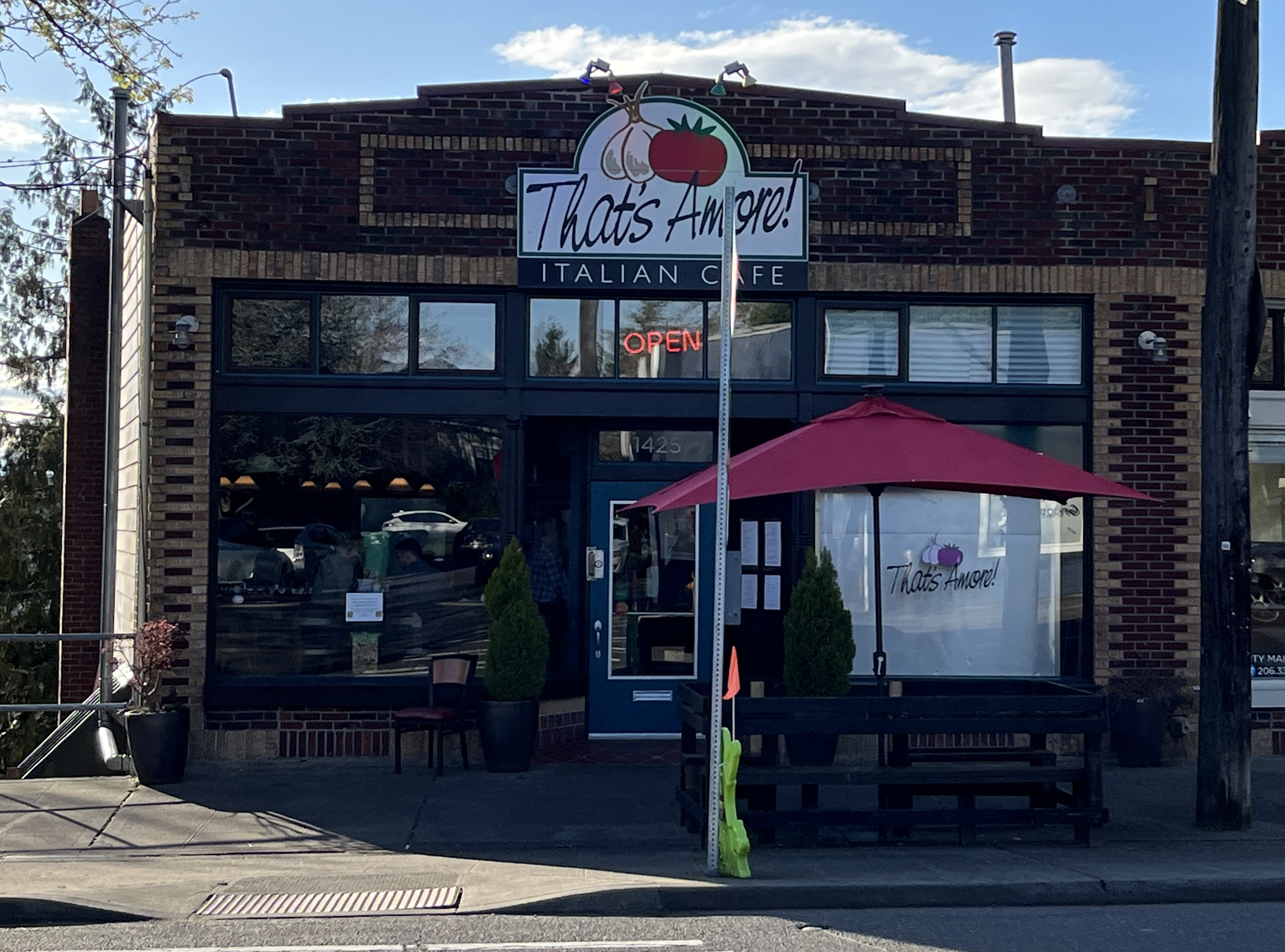
- The restaurant's exterior in 2024
- Interactive map of That's Amore Italian Cafe

Restaurant information
- Owners: Guy Devillier; David Hoefer
- Previous owners: Celester Gray; Salina Gray; Paul McMillion
- Food type: Italian
- Location: 1425 31st Avenue S, Seattle, King, Washington, 98144, United States
- Coordinates: 47.5896°N 122.2926°W

That's Amore Italian Cafe is an Italian restaurant in Seattle's Mount Baker neighborhood, in the U.S. state of Washington. The cafe has operated from a 1920s commercial building within a historic commercial district since 1994, and has changed ownership. Offering views of Seattle's skyline, That's Amore has garnered a positive reception and is considered one of the city's best Italian restaurants.

== Description ==
That's Amore Italian Cafe serves Italian cuisine in Seattle's Mount Baker neighborhood. It operates in a 1920s brick commercial building, called Mount Baker Pharmacy, within a historic commercial district. The approximately 14-table restaurant has "Spartan" furnishings, according to The Stranger, and offers views of the city's skyline. Seattle Best Places (1996) describes That's Amore as "cheery" and "urbane", with "decent" portions. The restaurant is dog-friendly, according to Seattle Post-Intelligencer. The menu includes pastas, pizza and calzones, tortellone, and risotto. The Bisteca e Gamberi has grilled top sirloin medallions and prawns with a tomato balsamic relish. The Fettuccine Pietro has a lemon pepper cream sauce. The Insalata Pera has crumbled blue cheese, glazed pears, walnuts, wild greens, and a honey chardonnay vinaigrette.

== History ==
Celester and Salina Gray opened That's Amore in 1994. Paul McMillion was later an owner. The restaurant was purchased by Guy Devillier and David Hoefer in 2018. Like many restaurants, That's Amore operated via take-out during the COVID-19 pandemic.

== Reception ==
The Not for Tourists Guide to Seattle has described That's Amore as "a real gem in the restaurant doldrums of Mt. Baker, despite the clichéd name". Seattle Metropolitan says, "A thousand devoted regulars can't be wrong about the swoony Italian fare at the aptly named Italian haunt on the Mount Baker Ridge. Ooh, and the view." Allecia Vermillion included That's Amore in the magazine's 2022 overview of the city's best Italian restaurants. Lynsi Burton included the business in the Seattle Post-Intelligencer's 2018 overview of the city's best pizza, according to Yelp. Thrillist says the cafe "touts perhaps one of the awesomest table-side views of Seattle, but we recommend making a reservation in advance to secure the spot for extra romantic value."

== See also ==
- List of Italian restaurants
