= Asanovo, Republic of Bashkortostan =

Asanovo Асаново
- Selo
- Location within Bashkortostan Location within Russia
- Coordinates: 54°53.7′N 55°29.2′E
- Country: Russia
- Region: Bashkortostan
- District: Ufimsky District
- Time zone: UTC+5:00

Asanovo (Russian: Асаново; Bashkir: Әсән, Äsän) is a rural locality (a selo) in Karmasansky Selsoviet, Ufimsky District, Bashkortostan, Russia. The population was 427 as of 2010. There are 3 streets.

== Geography ==
Asanovo is located 52 km northwest of Ufa (the district's administrative centre) by road. Karmasan is the nearest rural locality.
