= Nick Vallelonga =

American actor, screenwriter, and film director (born 1959)

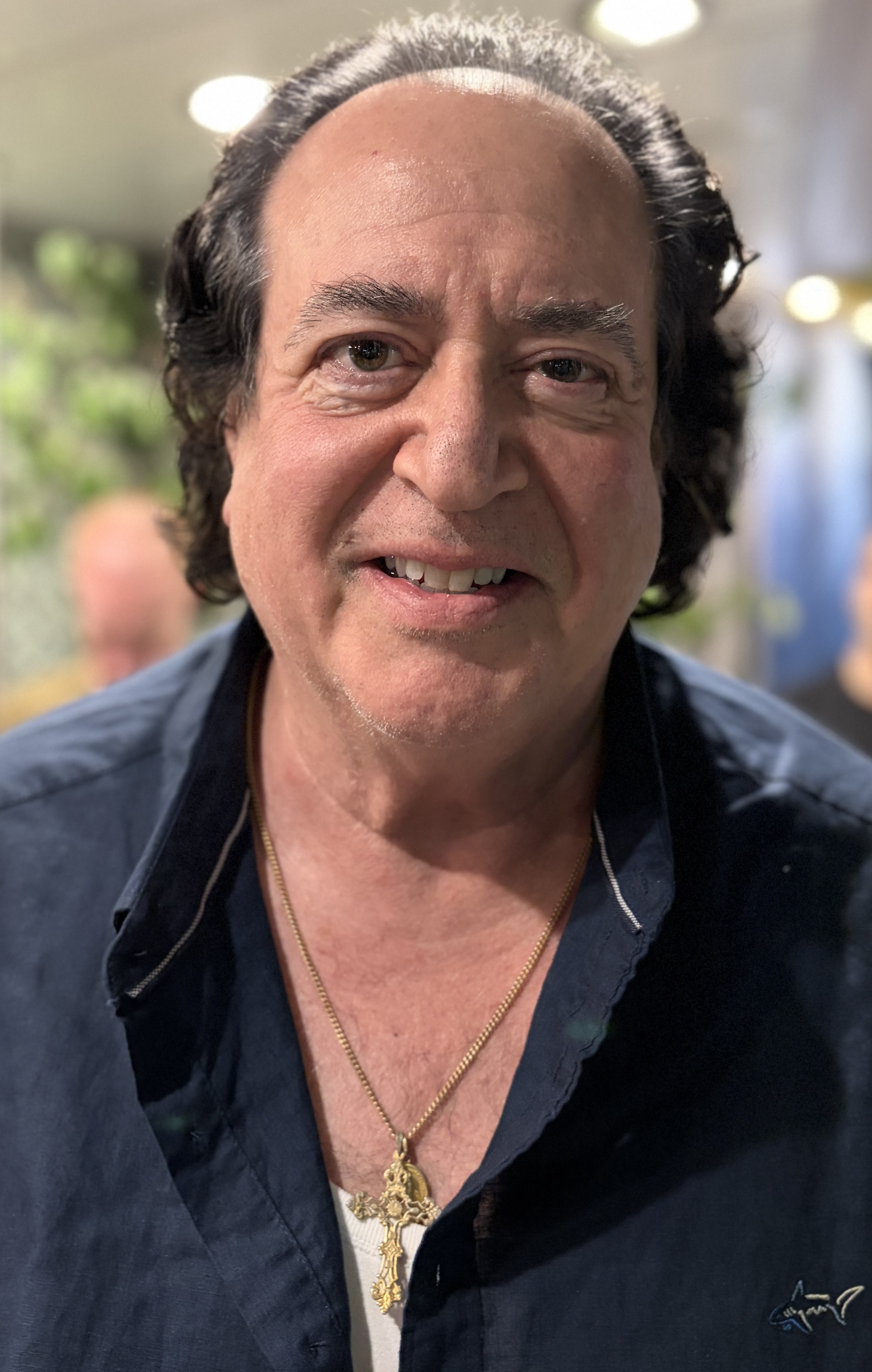
- Vallelonga in 2026
- Born: Nicholas Anthony Vallelonga; September 13, 1959 (age 67); The Bronx, New York City, U.S.
- Occupations: Actor, filmmaker
- Years active: 1972–present
- Parent(s): Tony Lip; Dolores Venere

Nicholas Anthony Vallelonga (born September 13, 1959) is an American actor and filmmaker. He is best known for co-writing and producing the film Green Book, for which he received two Academy Awards for Best Original Screenplay and Best Picture. He also won two Golden Globes in the same categories, as well as the PGA Award for Best Film. He has also directed the films In the Kingdom of the Blind, the Man with One Eye Is King, Choker and Stiletto, and co-wrote the screenplay to Deadfall.

== Life and career ==
Vallelonga was born in 1959, the son of Tony and Dolores Vallelonga. He had a younger brother, Frank, who died in November 2022. He initially followed his father into acting, with minor roles in films including The Godfather, Splash, Goodfellas, and Prizzi's Honor. He made his screenwriting debut with Deadfall, directed by Christopher Coppola. While continuing his acting career, he continued to write and direct various independent films, such as A Brilliant Disguise, The Corporate Ladder, Choker, Stiletto, and Yellow Rock.

Vallelonga achieved prominence with Green Book, which he co-wrote and produced. Based on the friendship of his father and Don Shirley, Green Book was critically praised and received dozens of award nominations, although the film was not without controversy, as Shirley's family accused Vallelonga of falsifying information in the movie. In Variety, Vallelonga disputed the allegations: "There's a lot of information [the Shirley family] doesn't have, and they were hurt that I didn't speak to them. But to be quite honest with you, Don Shirley himself told me not to speak to anyone. And he only wanted certain parts of his life … So obviously, to say I didn't contact them, that was hard for me because I didn't want to betray what I promised him."

In 2019, Vallelonga apologized for a 2015 tweet that agreed with Donald Trump's false claim that Muslims in Jersey City cheered when the World Trade Center towers collapsed.

== Filmography ==
Year	Title	Director	Writer	Producer
1993	Deadfall	No	Yes	No
1994	A Brilliant Disguise	Yes	Yes	No
1995	In the Kingdom of the Blind, the Man with One Eye Is King	Yes	Yes	No
1997	The Corporate Ladder	Yes	Yes	No
2005	Choker	Yes	Yes	No
2006	All In	Yes	No	No
2008	Stiletto	Yes	No	No
2011	Yellow Rock	Yes	No	No
2018	Green Book	No	Yes	Yes
TBA	That's Amore!	Yes	Yes	Yes
TBA	Red Card	No	Yes	No

Producer

- A Modern Twain Story: The Prince and the Pauper (2007)
- Jerseyboy Hero (2011)
- Vigilante Diaries (2016)
- Black Antenna (2019)
- Songs of Solomon (2020)

Acting credits

- The Godfather (1972)
- Splash (1984)
- The Pope of Greenwich Village (1984)
- Prizzi's Honor (1985)
- Goodfellas (1990)
- Psycho Cop 2 (1993)
- Coyote Ugly (2000)
- Machine (2006)
- Jersey Shore Shark Attack (2012)
- Vigilante Diaries (2016)
- Green Book (2018)
- The Poison Rose (2019)
- Paydirt (2020)
- The Comeback Trail (2020)
- Vanquish (2021)
- The Birthday Cake (2021)
- Aileen Wuornos: American Boogeywoman (2021)
- The Many Saints of Newark (2021)
- Every Last One of Them (2021)
- Monstrous (2022)
