= Psycho Cop =

- VHS artwork by Southgate Entertainment
- Directed by: Wallace Potts
- Written by: Wallace Potts
- Produced by: Jessica Rains; Cassian Elwes
- Starring: Jeff Qualle; Palmer Lee Todd; Linda West; Cindy Guyer; Dan Campbell; Robert R. Shafer; Greg Joujon-Roche
- Cinematography: Mark Walton
- Edited by: Ian McVey
- Music by: Alex Parker; Keyth Pisani
- Production company: Smoking Gun
- Distributed by: Southgate Entertainment
- Release date: November 28, 1989 (United States)
- Running time: 87 minutes
- Country: United States
- Language: English

Psycho Cop is a 1989 American slasher film, released direct-to-video. It was written and directed by Wallace Potts, noted for its similarities to the previous year's Maniac Cop by William Lustig and Larry Cohen. It was followed by a 1993 sequel entitled Psycho Cop 2.

== Plot ==
Two lost newlyweds named Barbra and Greg stumble onto the site of the ritualistic murder of a woman by Joe Vickers, a corrupt police officer and serial killer who is also a Devil worshiper. Vickers murders both of them. The next day, three couples travel to a secluded mansion that they have rented and are given a tour by the property's caretaker, who is later murdered by Vickers. Upon noticing the caretaker's disappearance, the couples go looking for him and encounter Vickers, who reassures them by claiming that the caretaker injured himself chopping wood and is now recovering in the hospital. That night, Zack leaves to get beer and is killed by Vickers via billy club being shoved down his throat.

Vickers proceeds to butcher Eric, Julie, and Sarah. Doug and Laura realize that Vickers is the culprit by his shoes prints and are chased into the forest where they are found by a pair of policemen, Chris and Bradley. Before being killed by Vickers, the officers reveal that he is really Gary Henley, a discharged psychiatric patient who has somehow infiltrated the California Police Department. Laura is pursued by Vickers to a clearing containing the crucified bodies of Zack, Julie, Eric, and Sarah. Laura shoots Vickers with his own sidearm, but he is unaffected. Vickers is finally defeated (and seemingly killed) when he has a "sharp" log thrown through him by Doug. Emergency services greet Laura and Doug at the mansion as Vickers recovers and a newscast announces that further evidence indicates that he is actually an escaped psychopathic serial killer named Ted Warnicky. The film ends with Vickers smiling evilly at the camera.

== Cast ==
- Robert R. Shafer as Officer Joe Vickers/Gary Henley/Ted Warnicky
- Jeff Qualle as Doug
- Palmer Lee Todd as Laura
- Dan Campbell as Eric
- Cindy Guyer as Julie
- Linda West as Sarah
- Greg Joujon-Roche as Zack
- Bruce Melena as Officer Bradley
- Glenn Steelman as Officer Chris
- Julie Araskog as Dead Woman
- Denise Hartman as Barbara/Cop #3
- David L. Zeisler as Greg/Cop #4

== Reception ==
Scott Aaron Stine, author of The Gorehound's Guide to Splatter Films of the 1980s, referred to Psycho Cop as "completely lifeless, homogenized fare" further hampered by the "grating" Robert R. Shafer. Conversely, Kent Byron Armstrong, writer of Slasher Films: An International Filmography, 1960 Through 2001, found Shafer to be "great" and opined that "Psycho Cop provides enough humor to be an enjoyable film".

Ozus' World Movie Reviews's Dennis Schwartz awarded Psycho Cop a C+, calling it "dumb" and "ridiculous" while Todd Martin of Horror News wrote, "I think that it is just a fun little movie and if you are looking for a nice brainless slasher film that doesn't make you think too hard then you should give this movie a shot". Digital Retribution condemned Psycho Cop, giving it a 1/5 while dismissing it as a "Routine slasher flick that's trying to be a riff on William Lustig's Maniac Cop but instead ends up as a poorly acted and weakly penned misfire" with terrible special effects and direction that was "some of the worst in filmic history". JA Kerswell of the Hysteria Lives! gave the film a similarly low score of 2/5, noting, "If you had to pick a perfect example of a join-the-dots slasher flick then this hopelessly generic addition to the subgenre would fit the bill perfectly".

== Home media ==
In North America, the film is only available on the VHS format as of July 2023.
