= That's Amore! (film) =

- Directed by: Nick Vallelonga
- Written by: Nick Vallelonga
- Produced by: Nick Vallelonga; Cassian Elwes; Brenda Emmett; Vince Emmett
- Starring: John Travolta; Mira Sorvino; Chazz Palminteri; William Fichtner; Robert Davi; Drea de Matteo; Joe Cortese; D. B. Sweeney
- Cinematography: Dante Spinotti
- Production companies: Vallelonga Productions; American Troubadours; Elevated Films
- Country: United States
- Language: English
- Budget: $34 million

That's Amore! is an upcoming American musical romantic comedy film written and directed by Nick Vallelonga, and starring John Travolta, Mira Sorvino, Chazz Palminteri, William Fichtner, Robert Davi, Drea de Matteo, Joe Cortese, and D. B. Sweeney.

== Cast ==
- John Travolta as Nick Venere
- Mira Sorvino
- Chazz Palminteri
- William Fichtner
- Robert Davi
- Drea de Matteo
- Joe Cortese
- D. B. Sweeney
- Angelo Boffa
- Paul Luquet

== Production ==
In May 2023, it was announced that Travolta and Katherine Heigl were cast in the film, with Christopher Walken in talks to co-star. In November 2023, it was reported that Walken had officially joined the cast alongside Fichtner, Sweeney, and de Matteo. However, both Heigl and Walken ultimately departed the project. They were replaced by Mira Sorvino and Chazz Palminteri, who assumed the leading roles opposite Travolta.

Production commenced in September 2022. It lasted until November that same year.

It was announced in December 2023 that the International Alliance of Theatrical Stage Employees filed a lawsuit against the filmmakers, alleging that the production failed to pay $570,000 in wages to 77 union workers.

Principal photography reportedly resumed in April 2026.
