= Luke Elwes =

British artist

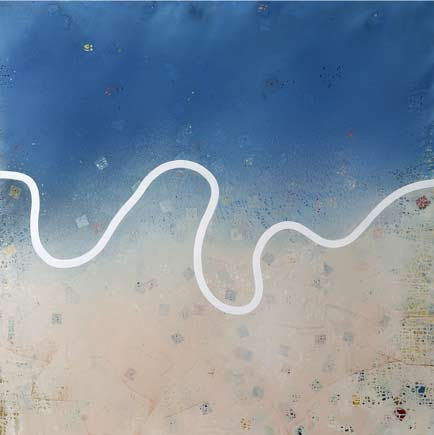
- Fold, 2006
- Born: 26 July 1961 (age 65); London, United Kingdom
- Known for: Contemporary art, Painting
- Spouse: Anneke Elwes
- Children: Jake; Toby
- Relatives: Simon Elwes (grandfather)
- Website: lukeelwes.com

Luke Andrew Cary Elwes (/ˈɛl.wɪs/; born 26 July 1961) is a British contemporary artist whose paintings capture his encounters with the landscape and with the elements. He gained prominence in the early nineties when he returned from his travels in India, Asia and North Africa with a series of key paintings.

== Biography ==
Elwes was born in London, where he now works and lives with his wife, Anneke (daughter of Hans du Moulin, of Farnham, Surrey), and their two children Jake Elwes and Toby Elwes. He is the eldest of three sons of Peter John Gervase Elwes (1929–2017), an businessman in the oil, gas and banking industries, and Rosalie Ann, daughter of the Army officer James Hennessy. His grandfather was the painter Simon Elwes RA, son of Victorian opera singer Gervase Elwes. He is also first cousin of the actor Cary Elwes. His early years were spent in Tehran, Persia, where the light and space of the desert were a formative influence.

He attended Worth School then between 1979 and 1985 he studied history at Bristol University and Painting at Camberwell School of Art. In 2007 he pursued postgraduate research in Art History at Birkbeck, University of London.

While working at Christie's, he began to travel and write, and after meeting Bruce Chatwin in 1987 he went to the central Australian desert to explore the landscape and its use in indigenous storytelling and artforms.

Since then he has continued to travel extensively, frequently returning to remote locations in India, Asia Minor and North Africa. In 1998, he served as artist-in-residence on an expedition to Mount Kailash, a holy mountain in western Tibet.

His work has also been inspired by the landscapes of Osea Island where he rented a cottage with his family for many years. Since 2007, he has worked in the former studio of Nigel Henderson in Landermere on the Essex marshes. In 2015, he was artist-in-residence at the Albers Foundation.

Since his first exhibition in 1990 he has had over twenty-five one-man shows in London, Paris and New York City. He also writes about contemporary painting for journals including Modern Painters (magazine), Galleries and the Royal Academy magazine.

== Exhibitions ==
=== Solo exhibitions ===
- Constellation, Frestonian Gallery, London (2024)
- Landermere, Frestonian Gallery, London (2021)
- Passage, Frestonian Gallery, London (2019)
- Floating world, Adam Gallery, London & Bath (2017)
- Floating world, National Trust, Flatford, Suffolk (2016)
- Albers Foundation, Broadbent Gallery, London (2015)
- Reflection, Campden Gallery (UK) (2015)
- Water Diaries, The Minories, Colchester (UK) (2014)
- Writing on water, Adam Gallery, London & Bath (2014)
- Luke Elwes: 10 Year survey, Young Gallery, Salisbury (2013)
- Constellation, Adam Gallery, London & Bath (2012)
- Celestial Confetti, North House Gallery, Essex (2012)
- Silent Kingdom, Adam Gallery, London & Bath (2011)
- Secret Water, Broadbent Gallery, London (2009)
- Peintures Recente, Galerie Marceau Bastille, Paris (2009)
- Refugia, Art First, London (2007)
- Flowing Ground, Broadbent Gallery, London (2005)
- Compass, Art First, London (2004)
- Recent Paintings, Art First, New York (2002)
- The Osea Paintings, Art First, London (2002)
- Peintures, Galerie Vieille du Temple, Paris (2001)
- Sanctuary, Art First, London (2000)
- Pilgrim, Art First, London (1998)
- Island, Rebecca Hossack Gallery, London (1995)
- Peintures, Galerie Vieille du Temple, Paris (1993)
- Storyline, Rebecca Hossack Gallery, London (1993)
- Landcross, Rebecca Hossack Gallery, London (1991)
- Bungle Bungle, Rebecca Hossack Gallery, London (1990)

=== Selected group shows ===
- Vision + The Visionary, Kookmin University Gallery, Seoul, South Korea (including Bridget Riley, Sammy Lee & Vakki) (2022)
- The Green Fuse, Frestonian Gallery, London (including Adrian Berg, Tim Braden & Bridget Riley) (2020)
- Natural Beauty, North House Gallery, Essex UK (2020)
- Landscape of Memory, Galleria Ceribelli, Italy (2019)
- SAID Business School, University of Oxford (2019)
- Currents, Sladers Yard Gallery, Dorset UK (2018)
- Amici Pittori Di Londra, Galleria Ceribelli, Italy (2017)
- Sladers Yard Gallery, UK (with Emma Stibborn, Alex Lowery, Daisy Cook) (2016)
- Segni di Londra, Museo della Grafica, Palazzo Lanfranchi, Pisa, Italy (2016)
- Segni di Londra, Fondazione Bottari Lattes, Monforte d’Alba, Italy (2015)
- Royal Academy Summer Exhibition (curated by Tess Jaray), London (2015)
- Vital signs: 12 London Artists, Clifford Chance, London & Galleria Ceribelli, Italy (with Tony Bevan, Lebrun, Hyman, Jackowski, James, Johnson, Lowry, Mannocci, Newbolt, Di Stefano, Verity) (2015)
- Radiance, Sladers Yard Gallery, Dorset UK (2014)
- Cross Country, Broadbent Gallery, London (with Andrew Vass & Kate Palmer) (2012)
- Threadneedle Prize for Painting, London (2012)
- Royal Academy Summer Exhibition, London (2011)
- Another Country, Estorick Collection, London (with Tony Bevan, Di Stefano, Hyman, Jackowski, James, Johnson, Lowery, Mannocci, Newbolt) (2010)
- Critics Choice, Browse & Darby, London (selected by Andrew Lambirth) (2010)
- L'Isle Joyeuse, Art First & Falle Fine Art, Jersey (with Alex Lowery & Bridget Macdonald) (2009)
- Hester Gallery, Leeds (with Maurice Cockrill, Stephen Chambers, Lino Mannocci & Christopher Wood) (2009)
- Genius Loci, Galleria Ceribelli, Bergamo, Italy (2008)
- Gli Amici Pittori Di Londra, Galleria Ceribelli, Bergamo & Galleria Ghelfi, Vicenza, Italy (2007)
- Mapping, Bury Art Gallery, Manchester (2007)
- Celeste Art Prize, London (2007)
- Translations, work from the National Gallery (London), Art First, London (2006)
- Singer & Friedlander/Sunday Times Watercolour Exhibition, London (2005)
- Royal Academy Summer Exhibition(2005)
- Look, Stranger! Art First, London (Luke Elwes, Alex Lowery, Bridget MacDonald) (2003)
- Royal Academy Summer Exhibition(2003)
- Water’s edge, Art First, London (Luke Elwes, Anthony Whishaw, Lino Mannocci) (2002)
- 10th Anniversary Exhibition, Art First, London (2001)
- Galerie Vieille du Temple, Paris (2000)
- The Hunting Group Art Prizes, London and Bath (1999)
- Royal Academy Summer Exhibition(1998)
- 14th Annual Open, Royal Overseas League, London & Edinburgh (1997)
- Bayer Earth Art Prize,(Highly Commended), London (1996)
- Endangered Spaces, Council for the Protection of Rural England, Christies, London (1996)
- Royal Academy Summer Exhibition (as invited artist) (1995)
- Centenary, Contemporary British Art & the National Trust, Christie’s, London (1995)
- Sanctuary Commission Project (with Maggi Hambling, Shirazah Houshiary, Keith grant, Mali Morris), Chelsea & Westminster Hospital, London (1994)
- Celebration, New British Art, Benjamin Rhodes Gallery, London (1994).
- Reflections, Edinburgh & London (chosen by The Spectator)(1993)
- Spring, Barbican, London (chosen by The Spectator)(1992)
- Songlines, Barbican, London (1991)
- Earthscape, Hastings & Southampton City Art Gallery (1991)
- Il Sud Del Mondo, L’Altra Arte Contemporanea, Marsala, Sicily, and Milan, Italy (1991)
- The Broad Horizon, Agnews, London (1990)
- Richard Demarco Gallery, Edinburgh (1988)
- 39eme Salon de la Jeune Peinture, Grand Palais, Paris (1988)
- 38eme Salon de la Jeune Peinture, Grand Palais, Paris (1987)

== Selected collections ==
Collections include the Bayer Collection; Chelsea and Westminster Hospital; Christie's Contemporary Art Collection; Deutsche Hypo Bank; Luther Pendragon Collection and The National Trust Foundation for Art.

== Publications ==
- Genius loci, Luke Elwes (2008), Ediz. italiana e inglese, Editore Lubrina-LEB (collana Arte moderna e contemporanea)
- Roger Hilton: Swinging Out into the Void by Andrew Lambirth (Author), Luke Elwes (Author), Anett Hauswald (Author), Kettle's Yard Gallery (August 2, 2008), ISBN 1-904561-29-2
- Luke Elwes at Art First, The (London) Independent, Sep 21, 2004 by Sue Hubbard
- Luke Elwes, Sanctuary, by Nicholas Usherwood, Art First Contemporary Art (2000), ISBN 1-901993-17-5
- Pilgrim, by Andrew Lambirth, Art First (February 1998), ISBN 1-901993-03-5
- Island, Rebecca Hossack Gallery (1995), ISBN 1-872022-90-1
- Bungle Bungle, the Australian Paintings, by Colin Gleadell, Rebecca Hossack Gallery (1990), ISBN 1-872022-20-0
