= Nicos Ladommatos =

British mechanical engineer

Nicos Ladommatos is a British mechanical engineer. From 2004, he was the Kennedy Professor for Mechanical Engineering and Head of Department for UCL Mechanical Engineering. In his career, he authored or co-authored over 150 peer-reviewed papers., specialising in the areas of combustion, combustion engines, fuel development and future fuels.

== Academic career ==
Ladommatos studied for his first degree in Mechanical Engineering at Queen Mary College (University of London). This was followed by an MSc in Thermal Power and PhD from Imperial College in Energy Utilisation. Following his studies, Ladommatos worked as a Project Engineer with multinational professional services firm Arup. In 1984, he became a Mechanical Engineering Lecturer at Brunel University

He became Head of the Mechanical Engineering Department at Brunel in 1994. He then went on to become Dean of the Faculty of Technology & Information Systems between 1998 and 2001 and then Pro-Vice Chancellor, Research & Enterprise between 2001 and 2003, all at Brunel University.

In 2004, Ladommatos began working at UCL where he held the position of Kennedy Chair and was the Head of the Department of Mechanical Engineering until September 2013. Throughout this time, he continued his research in combustion and fuels.

== Societies and Institutions ==
- Chartered Mechanical Engineer (CEng)
- Member of the Energy Institute
- Fellow of the Institution of Mechanical Engineers (FIMechE)
- Member, Academic Standards Committee, Institution of Mechanical Engineers (1997-2002)
- Member of the EPSRC College of Assessors (2000 – to date)
- Chairman of UNICEG (Universities Internal Combustion Engines Group) (2001 - 2003)
- Member, Editorial Board of International Journal of Engine Research (2003 - to date)

== Publications ==
Ladommatos co-authored the book Engine Instrumentation, Flow and Combustion Diagnostics with Professor H. Zhao, published in 2001 by SAE.

Ladommatos has authored and co-authored over 150 peer-reviewed scientific publications, with a focus on the areas of combustion, combustion engines, fuel development, and future fuels.
