= Damian Elwes =

British artist (born 1960)

- Born: Dusan Damian Cary Elwes; 10 August 1960 (age 66); London, England
- Citizenship: British
- Occupation: Artist
- Years active: 1984–present
- Spouse: Lewanne Collie (m. 1996)
- Children: 2
- Parents: Dominick Elwes (father); Tessa Kennedy (mother)
- Relatives: Cassian Elwes (brother); Cary Elwes (brother)
- Website: damianelwes.com

Dusan Damian Cary Elwes (born 10 August 1960) is a British artist with studios in Los Angeles and the Colombian rainforest. His paintings explore themes such as the cycle of life and creativity. These artworks can be monumental and three-dimensional, such as a painting in which visitors walk from room to room on the ground floor of the "Villa La Californie" (2006–2018), to witness the extent of Pablo Picasso's creativity in April, 1956 or an immense landscape painting on the ground, Amazon (1999), on which visitors can walk above the exotic, flowering plants of a cloud forest and search for the source of the river.

In 2018, the Musée en Herbe in Paris hosted "Secrets of the Studio, from Claude Monet to Ai Weiwei," a retrospective of Elwes's Artist Studio paintings. These paintings transport viewers directly into the worlds of creative geniuses from the 19th century to the present. More than one hundred thousand people attended his immersive and interactive exhibition. Visitors could walk through Picasso's Villa in Cannes or roam around in a VR painting of Brancusi's original Montparnasse workshop.

== Early life ==
Elwes was born in London into a family of artists. His father Dominick Elwes and grandfather Simon Elwes were portrait painters. Both died when Elwes was fifteen and left him easels and brushes. His mother was the interior designer and socialite Tessa Kennedy. He has two brothers, Cary Elwes, an actor, and Cassian Elwes, an independent film producer. His ability in Mathematics helped him gain a place at Harvard University. At graduation, his play-writing professor gave him a palette knife that had once belonged to Henri Matisse. He went to Paris where, for two years, he made paintings of the studios of contemporary artists as a way to learn from them.

== Work ==
In the early 1980s, Elwes lived in New York, where he was an early exponent of graffiti. There he met Keith Haring who encouraged Elwes to start painting. Some of his first paintings were chosen by the eminent London art dealer, Robert Fraser, to be included in a graffiti exhibition with Jean-Michel Basquiat at the Fruitmarket Gallery in Edinburgh, 11 August – 23 September 1984.

In 1990, Elwes went to live in Colombia with his wife, Lewanne. There he created four vast, interactive paintings which viewers can walk around inside. A floor painting, Fallen Tree (1997) describes the cycle of life in one of the last surviving forests of mahogany. In a clearing in the forest, one old tree has fallen to the ground and is decaying. New saplings can be seen growing from the dead tree. This same cycle exists in painting and in all forms of innovation. So, while this work might be seen as a spur for conscience, it also contains an indication of Elwes's confidence in the power and continuity of creativity. In London, 2010, Elwes exhibited an even larger floor painting about the origin of life. That artwork depicts a primary source of the Amazon River which exists at the summit of a Colombian volcano called Puracé. The painting was placed under plexiglass in the gallery and visitors could walk all over it. For the surrounding walls, Elwes created contemporary cave paintings of a woman asleep in that exotic ecosystem.

A documentary, Inside Picasso's Studio (2006, by Marina Zenovich) follows Elwes as he creates a vast painting describing the various studios on the ground floor of Picasso's Villa La Californie, as they were in April 1956. The painting wraps around several walls and viewers are able to walk from room to room while examining hundreds of Picasso's artworks in progress. Curator Fred Hoffman wrote, "While we, the viewer, are immediately intrigued and invited to partake of these historical moments, what actually sustains, even heightens our interest, is Damian Elwes' ability to turn documentation and historical record into compelling pictorial visions requiring repeated viewing and constant deciphering. Elwes' concern for historical accuracy, and his subsequent investigative process enable his fully realized paintings to have a freshness and immediacy which none of the source material contains nor conveys. It is not, therefore, the fact that he has painted Picasso's studio that makes Elwes' work of interest. Rather, it is his ability to use the historical source material about Picasso to achieve some immediacy for his own concerns as a painter. In the end, it is the expressive quality of these works that we feel drawn to."

Elwes's solo exhibition at Pearl Lam Galleries in Hong Kong opens in 2026.

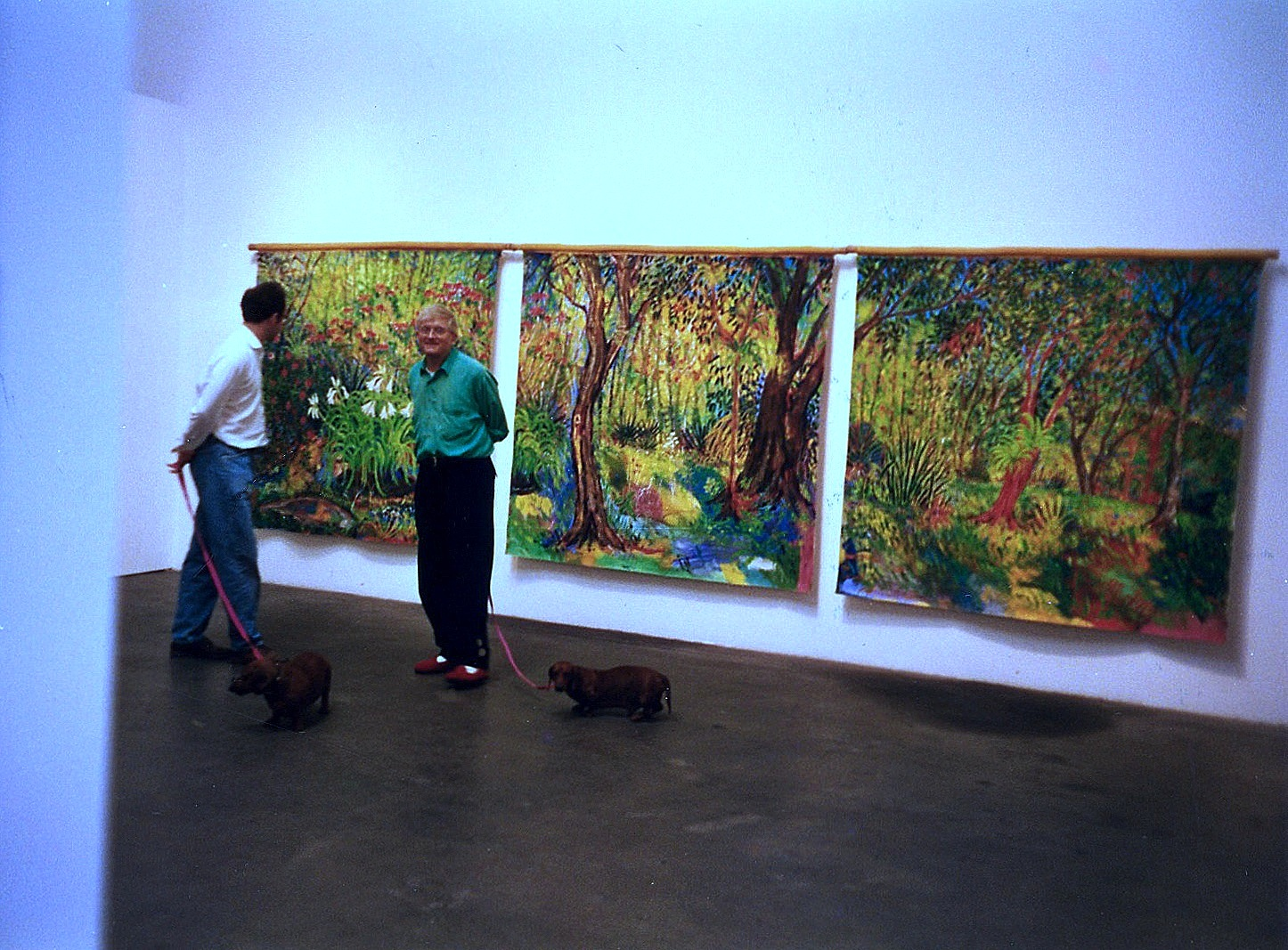
Damian Elwes

== Selected exhibitions ==
- Francis Naumann Fine Art, "The Studios of Matisse, Picasso, Warhol and Duchamp," 22 October – 15 December 2004
- M&B Fine Art,"Picasso's Villa La Californie," 2 March – 15 May 2006
- Lefevre Fine Art, "Creative Spaces: The Studios of Dali, Kahlo, Picasso, Matisse," 6 June – 4 July 2008
- El Segundo Museum of Art "Spark," 22 Feb – 24 May 3 Feb – 21 June 2015
- Fleming Museum, Vermont "Staring Back: The Creation and Legacy of Picasso's Demoiselles d'Avignon," 2015
- Modernism Inc, San Francisco "Artist Studios from Picasso to Jeff Koons," 5 May – 25 June 2016
- Musée en Herbe, Paris "Secrets of the Studio, Monet to Ai Weiwei,"23 Jan – 23 September 2017
- Unit London, London "Where Art Happened – From Klint to Party," 17 Nov – 19 Dec 2020
- Unit London, London "Studio Visit," 8 July – 22 September 2024

== Personal life ==
In 1996, Elwes married Lewanne Collie, with whom he has two children: a daughter, Cosima Cary Elwes (born 1997), and a son, Aubrey Bede Elwes (born 2000).

== Series of paintings ==
- Amazon, 1999 (Installation) A floor painting describes the kind of ecosystem which existed millions of years before humans and which is likely to exist millions of years from now.
- Fallen Tree, 1998 (Installation) A floor painting which demonstrates how the cycle of life in a primary forest of mahogany is similar to the life cycle of man.
- Forest of Statues, 1998 (Installation) 12 panels form a circular 360-degree painting of a forest where early humans have left carved statues.
- Bull Paintings, 1993–2014 Meditations about the significance of cave paintings are brought to life because at 9 years old Elwes was gored and almost killed by a Spanish fighting bull.
- Edge of the Forest, 1997 (Installation) 12 panels join together to form a square 360-degree painting. Viewers find themselves in an ancient garden with a house on one side and a forest on the other.
- Paintings of Byron, Keats and Shelley in Italy, 1992–93
- Paintings of the studios of 19th Century Masters, 2002–2004
- Paintings of the studios of 20th Century Masters, 2004–2012
- Picasso's Villa La Californie, 2006–2012 (Installation) 8 panels connect and wrap around three walls. This painting describes a moment of intense human creativity.
- Women, 2010–2012 These were created to be shown with the Amazon painting to indicate that the painting is about the source of life. In the mythology of some Amazonian tribes, the source of the river is the first woman and all life comes from her.
- Contemporary Artist studios, such as Hockney, Kapoor, Wei Wei, Kusama, Twombly and Koons, 2015–2018
- VR painting of Brancusi's Studio, 2018
