= Villa La Californie (Damian Elwes) =

Series of paintings by Damian Elwes

The Villa La Californie is a series of paintings by the English artist Damian Elwes (born 1960). They link together to describe almost the entire ground floor of the Pablo Picasso's Villa La Californie in Cannes, Southern France.

In the series, architectural forms portrayed in one painting continue into the next, thereby inferring that as the eye of the viewer moves from painting to painting that you are physically moving from room to room in the master's studio. As such, this group of paintings functions as an installation. Elwes envelops the viewer as a way of enhancing the experience of what it would have been like to be in Picasso's studio in Cannes in 1956. He has assembled all extant documentation on any and every item that Picasso surrounded himself with. These include all the notebooks, sketches, African masks, works in production (such as paintings, prints, ceramics, and sculpture), as well as gifts from friends, articles of clothing and even artworks by his own children. All of these elements have been included in Elwes’ work with the goal of accurately documenting Picasso's working process. During this period in Picasso's life he was fascinated by the old masters. Picasso thought that his own studio looked like Velasquez's studio in Las Meninas. While creating this series of paintings, Elwes discovered that Picasso was intentionally placing objects in his studio in order to recreate Velasquez's studio. Then he left everything in place and went upstairs to create 58 versions of Las Meninas.

== History ==
In December 1954, Picasso began to paint a series of free variations on Delacroix's Les Femmes d'Alger. He began his first version (cat. 19) six weeks after learning of the death of his lifelong friend and rival Henri Matisse — and so, for Picasso, the "oriental" subject of this series of paintings held strong associations with Matisse as well as with Delacroix. Matisse had been famous for his images of languid, voluptuous women known as odalisques — the French form of the Turkish word for women in a harem. "When Matisse died he left his odalisques to me as a legacy," joked Picasso. Many of Picasso's portrayals of Jacqueline circa 1955–56 represent her in this guise (cat. 9).

The consequences of Picasso's Femmes d'Alger series were far-reaching: "I thought so much about Les Femmes d'Alger that I bought La Californie," Picasso explained to his biographer Pierre Daix. La Californie was a Belle-Époque villa situated in the foothills of Cannes in the South of France. Picasso bought it in 1955, and it was here that he painted the Nude in a Rocking-Chair (cat. 16). The light-filled interiors, the views over the Mediterranean and the exotic garden evoked a feeling of spaciousness and ease which corresponded to Picasso's idea of the Orient.

The art historian and collector Douglas Cooper was perhaps the first to realise that the paintings done at La Californie marked a return to Picasso's peak form. In April 1956, he wrote to the curator Alfred Barr:

"I recently spent the day with Picasso and went through most of what he has done since last July. I have been greatly impressed … A whole series of interiors of La Californie deriving half from Delacroix half from Matisse — great emphasis on ornament, arabesque, simplification … In short, as you are planning to come to Europe, this is a word to tell you that you must see all this in the studio: it is to my mind much better than anything since 1946."

Picasso would spend six years at La Californie (1955–1961).
