= Dominick Elwes =

English portrait painter (1931–1975)

- Born: Bede Evelyn Dominick Elwes; 24 August 1931; Great Billing, Northamptonshire, England
- Died: 5 September 1975 (aged 44); Chelsea, London, England
- Resting place: Amberley, West Sussex
- Other name: Dominic Elwes
- Education: Ladycross; Friends Academy (1940–1941); St. Albans (1941–1944); Downside (1945–1948)
- Occupations: Editor, journalist, portrait-painter
- Known for: Paintings, elopement scandal
- Spouse: Tessa Kennedy (m. 1958; div. 1969)
- Children: Cassian Elwes; Damian Elwes; Cary Elwes
- Father: Simon Elwes

Bede Evelyn Dominick Elwes (24 August 1931 – 5 September 1975) was an English portrait painter whose much publicised elopement with an heiress in 1957 created an international scandal.

== Early life ==
Elwes (pronounced "El-wez") was born on 24 August 1931 at Billing Hall, Northamptonshire, to English portrait painter Simon Elwes (RA, KM), and the Hon. Gloria Rodd, daughter of the 1st Baron Rennell, some-time British Ambassador to Rome, and Conservative MP for St. Marylebone (1928–1932).

Elwes was descended from the Catholic Cary-Elwes (sometimes known simply as Elwes) family, which includes such noted British prelates, priests and monks as abbot Columba Cary-Elwes, Bishop Dudley Cary-Elwes, and Father Luke Cary-Elwes. Dominick was the grandson of Gervase Cary Elwes (1866–1921), a diplomat and professional classical tenor, and Lady Winifride Mary Elizabeth Feilding, daughter of the 8th Earl of Denbigh. Dominick was a nephew of the English novelist, biographer and journalist Nancy Mitford, and a godson of Evelyn Waugh. One of his cousins was the 3rd Baron Rennell. For his early education, Dominick spent much of his childhood during the Second World War in the United States, after which he returned to England to attend Downside School in Somerset.

== Career ==
In January 1960, Elwes became the assistant editor of Lilliput Magazine until its closure in July of that same year. From 1960 to 1962, he was the Company Director of Dome Press where he began the newsweekly Topic Magazine as editorial director, along with William Rees-Davies and Maurice Macmillan. Topic was backed by twenty persons amounting to $420,000. The backers included Macmillan, and the Duchess of Argyll. While at Topic, Elwes discovered and hired a then unknown art student to be a graphic artist for the magazine, Ridley Scott, who went on to become a famous director. In 1963, together with Nicholas Luard, Elwes published and subsequently became the director of Design Yearbook, which developed into the book-packaging firm November Books. The company's clients included Thames & Hudson, a publisher of books on art, architecture, design and visual culture. In 1964, he co-wrote a book with Luard, Refer to Drawer: Being a Penetrating Survey of a Shameful National Practice – Hustling, which included illustrations by cartoonist John Glashan. Elwes subsequently became a member of the National Union of Journalists.

Following in his father's footsteps Elwes then became a portrait painter, painting many of London's Clermont Set. Around 1967 he moved to Andalucia, Spain, where, with the aid of architect Philip Jebb, he designed a Mediterranean-style apartment complex, completed in 1970. Clients included Luard and the actor Hugh Millais. In 1975, Elwes and George Britnell became owners of a hair salon, Figurehead, on Pont Street in Knightsbridge which he filled with paintings by his father. His then ex-wife helped promote the salon for an article in The Daily Telegraph. One of Elwes's portraits was of John Bingham, 7th Earl of Lucan, who disappeared in November 1974 after the murder of his children's nanny. Elwes and Lucan had been close friends since their schooldays.

== Personal life ==
At the age of 26, Dominick Elwes met and wished to marry 19-year-old shipping heiress Tessa Kennedy, daughter of Geoffrey Ferrar Kennedy and Daška Ivanović. Kennedy's parents, however, disapproved of the relationship and instituted wardship proceedings.

On 27 November 1957, Geoffrey Kennedy obtained a restraining order against Elwes from Justice Sir Ronald Roxburgh, barring the couple from marrying. The High Court Tipstaff was not authorised, however, to apprehend Elwes anywhere outside England and Wales. After initially attempting to marry in Scotland while being pursued by the press, Elwes and Kennedy eloped to Havana, Cuba, where they married in a civil ceremony on 27 January 1958 as guests of American mobster Meyer Lansky, who provided accommodation for them at his hotel, the Habana Riviera.

When Fidel Castro's revolution threatened the stability of the country, the newlyweds fled aboard a raft with two National Geographic explorers who were sailing to Miami. They flew to New York City from Miami, obtaining a marriage licence on 31 March in New York. On 1 April, the couple repeated the ceremony to ensure they were legally married in Manhattan's Supreme Court; the ceremony was officiated by Justice Henry Clay Greenberg. On 15 July, the two set sail for England aboard the liner SS Liberté docking at Southampton. The next day, accompanied by his wife and an attorney, Elwes turned himself over to authorities and was transferred to Brixton Prison, where he remained for two weeks while awaiting trial for contempt of court for defying the judge's order to return Miss Kennedy to her parents. At trial, the judge accepted that Elwes loved his bride but commented that every parent knows that love was not "readily convertible into bread and butter" for the support of a wife. In his ruling he directed that Elwes be released from custody but also ordered that Kennedy remain a ward of court. Elwes and Kennedy were married and had three children, Cassian Elwes, who became a film producer, Damian Elwes, an artist, and Cary Elwes, an actor. The marriage was dissolved in London in January 1969, and Elwes never remarried.

For two years, between 1972 and 1974, Elwes was in a relationship with Helen Jay, the daughter of a Labour politician, Douglas Jay. She described him as "one of the most glamorous men I'd ever met". They lived together in New York City and near Málaga, where they became friends of the drama critic Kenneth Tynan. The relationship eventually broke up because Jay wanted marriage and children, but Elwes did not.

In her biography of her husband, Kathleen Tynan later said of Elwes "Dominick Elwes was a bounder and a wit, and Ken adored him."

== Lucan aftermath ==
On the day after the murder of Sandra Rivett, 8 November 1974, Elwes took part in a gathering of Lucan's inner circle, a lunch arranged by John Aspinall. Some months on, in June 1975, the journalist James Fox published an article in the Sunday Times Magazine which cast Lucan in a poor light and revealed the connection between Lucan and Elwes. This was illustrated by a portrait by Elwes of Lucan's Clermont Club set, together with photographs that Lucan's other friends accused Elwes of selling. Patrick Marnham commented that Elwes had put himself "on the other side of the green-baize door, the jester as social critic", and Elwes was barred from Annabel's and ostracised. A friend who considered him to be close to a breakdown sent him overseas to recover, and when he returned in August, he found the Clermont set had completely turned against him.

== Death ==
A chronic victim of manic depression, Elwes had tried to kill himself before. He died on 5 September 1975 at 1, Stewart's Grove, Chelsea, from an overdose of barbiturates. There was a suicide note and a will, and the coroner's verdict was suicide. It happened about a month after the death of his father. His body was found by his girlfriend Melissa Wyndham. In his book The Gamblers, John Pearson implicated James Goldsmith in the suicide.

Elwes's mother Gloria Elwes died on 8 October 1975, at Amberley, West Sussex, leaving an estate valued for probate at more than £56,000 (equivalent to £440,774 in 2025).

== Selected paintings ==
- 1969 – Portrait of John Aspinall
- 1970 – Portrait of Min Aspinall & Mushie
- 1971 – Portrait of Sir Vivian Naylor-Leyland
- 1972 – Portrait of Lord Lucan

== Bibliography ==
- Refer to Drawer: Being a Penetrating Survey of a Shameful National Practice – Hustling. With Nicholas Luard. London: Arthur Barker, 1964.

== See also ==
- Kenneth Tynan
- Mark Birley
- Lady Annabel Goldsmith
