= Villa La Californie =

Villa in Cannes, once owned by Pablo Picasso

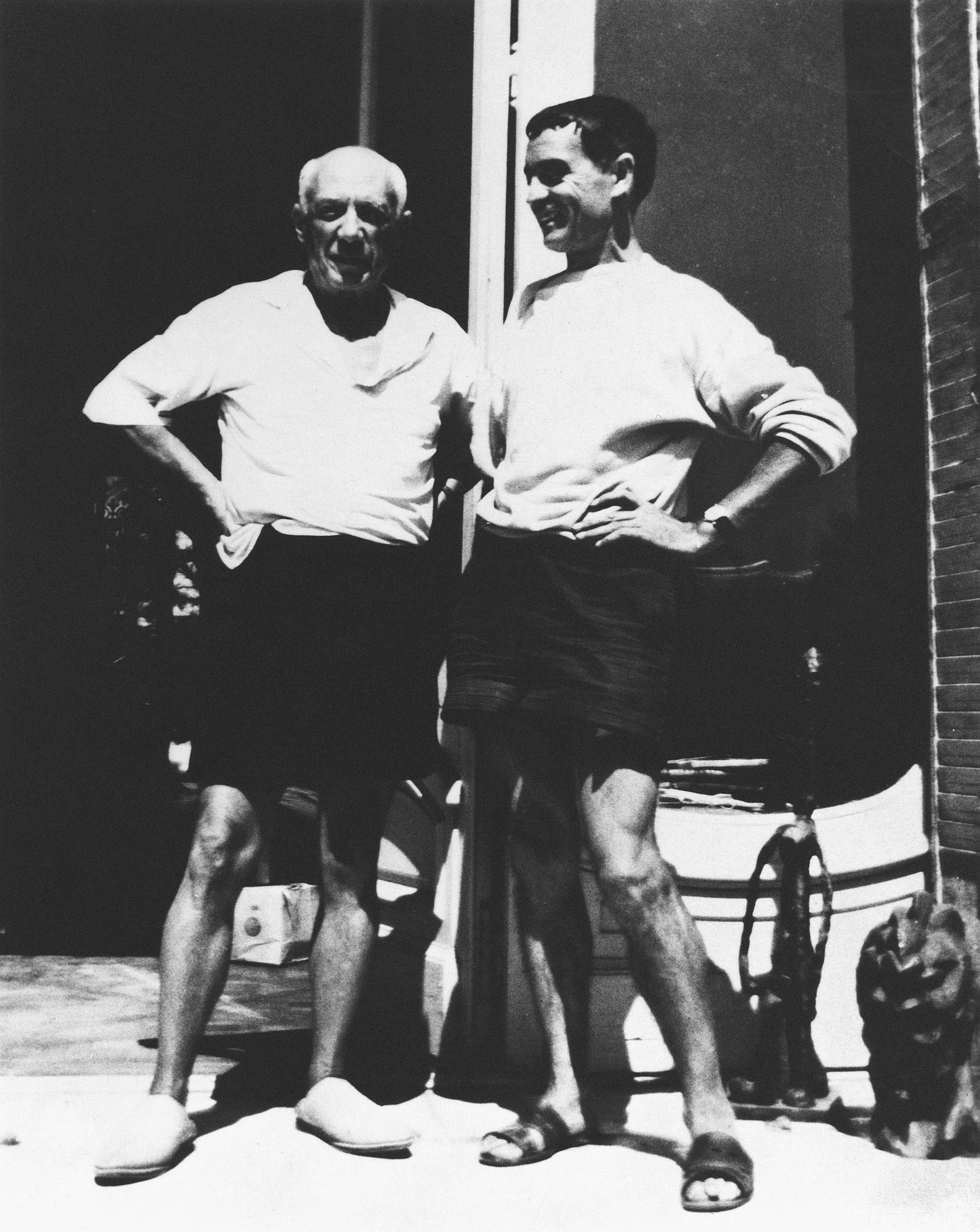
- Pablo Picasso with René Bernasconi at Villa La Californie in 1955

- Location within Provence-Alpes-Côte d'Azur
- Former names: Villa Fénelon
- Alternative names: Pavillon de Flore

General information
- Type: Private villa
- Architectural style: Beaux-Arts
- Location: 22 Coste Belle Avenue; Cannes, France
- Coordinates: 43°33′2.79″N 7°2′31.57″E
- Completed: 1920

Design and construction
- Architect: Henri Picquart

Villa La Californie, originally Villa Fénelon and now called Pavillon de Flore, is a villa at 22 Coste Belle Avenue in Cannes, France. It is located in the quarter of La Californie, from which the villa took its name. The villa was built in 1920 and served as the residence of artist Pablo Picasso from 1955 to 1961.

== History ==
Eugène Tripet (1816–1896), consul of France in Moscow, moved to Cannes in 1848 with his wife Alexandra Feodorovna Skrypitzine (1818–1895), a wealthy Russian heiress and friend of Prosper Mérimée. He built the "Villa Alexandra" on the heights of the city, overlooking the Cape of the Croisette facing the Lérins Islands. That home was quickly surrounded by the residences of many members of the Russian aristocracy who vacationed in Cannes, and the area came to be nicknamed "Little Russia".

In 1903, Tripet's son-in-law, General vicomte Alphonse de Salignac-Fénelon, acquired the northern part of the garden of Tripet's property and commissioned a winter residence project from architect Henri Picquart. In 1920, the project was completed and the house was named "Villa Fénelon".

Pablo Picasso, who had been living in the quarter of La Californie since the 1940s, bought the villa in 1955 and moved there with Jacqueline Roque. It is from this workshop that he painted the Bay of Cannes in 1958, where he represents the seascape strangled by the urban environment. In 1961, with the construction of a new building obstructing the sea view, Picasso decided to look for another home. He left the villa in Cannes and moved to Mougins, where he spent his last years.

During the inventory of Picasso's estate, many previously unknown works were found in the villa and formed part of the original collection of the national museum which bears his name. His granddaughter, Marina Picasso, inherited the villa and finished restoration work in 1987. She renamed the villa "Pavillon de Flore". In 2015, she put the villa up for sale.

== Cultural ==
The house is a private property, registered in 2001 in the Inventaire général du patrimoine culturel in the region Provence-Alpes-Côte d'Azur as part of the seaside resort of Cannes (Patrimoine balnéaire de Cannes).

On August 11, 2020, Marina Picasso's son Florian performed a music and light show on the property. Over 25 people worked for four months on the presentation. Florian said of the performance, "Turning the entire house into a moving piece of art felt like the right way to pay tribute to what this place represents and the history it has."

== See also ==
- Villa La Californie, series of paintings by Damian Elwes
