= Cary Elwes =

English actor (born 1962)

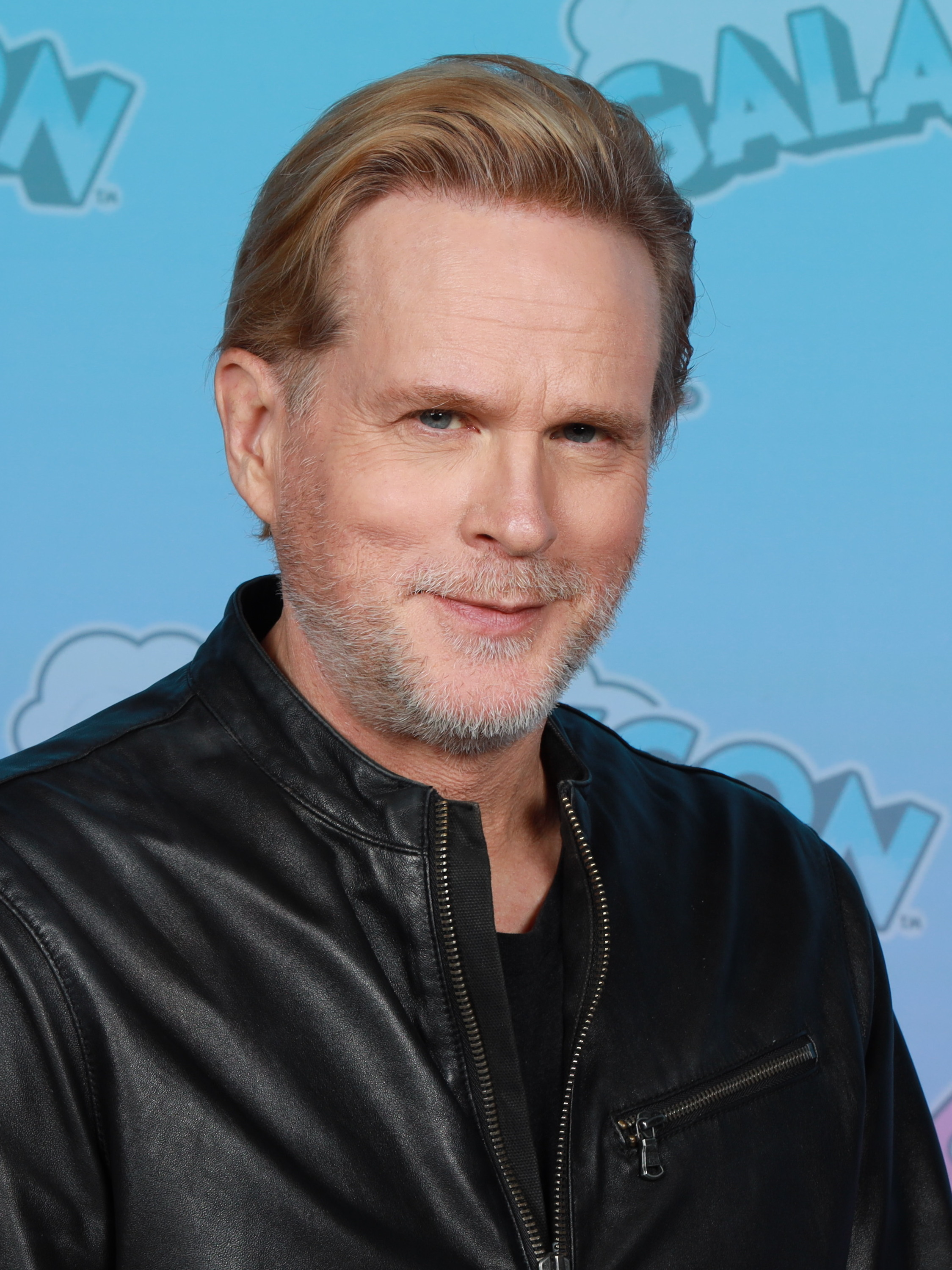
- Elwes at GalaxyCon Richmond in 2025
- Born: Ivan Simon Cary Elwes; 26 October 1962 (age 64); Westminster, London, England
- Education: Sarah Lawrence College; London Academy of Music and Dramatic Art
- Occupation: Actor
- Years active: 1979–present
- Spouse: Lisa Marie Kurbikoff (m. 2000)
- Children: 1
- Parent(s): Dominick Elwes; Tessa Kennedy
- Relatives: Cassian Elwes (brother); Damian Elwes (brother)

Ivan Simon Cary Elwes (/ˈɛlwɪs/ EL-wiss; born 26 October 1962) is an English actor. He starred as Westley in The Princess Bride (1987), and also had lead roles in films such as Robin Hood: Men in Tights (1993) and the Saw series. The accolades he has received include nominations for a Screen Actors Guild Award and two Satellite Awards. Elwes's other performances in films include Glory (1989); Days of Thunder (1990); Hot Shots! (1991); Bram Stoker's Dracula (1992); Twister (1996); Kiss the Girls (1997); Liar Liar (1997); Ella Enchanted (2004); No Strings Attached (2011); Hansel & Gretel Get Baked (2013); BlackBerry and Mission: Impossible – Dead Reckoning Part One (both 2023); and Mission: Impossible – The Final Reckoning (2025).

Elwes has appeared on television in a number of series including The X-Files, Seinfeld, From the Earth to the Moon, Psych, and Life in Pieces. In 2019, he appeared in the Netflix drama series Stranger Things, the Amazon Prime comedy series The Marvelous Mrs. Maisel, and in 2024, he appeared in the Paramount+ comedy series Knuckles. Elwes has written a memoir of his time working on The Princess Bride called As You Wish: Inconceivable Tales from the Making of The Princess Bride, which was published in 2014.

== Early life and education ==
The arms of the Elwes family

Elwes was born on 26 October 1962 in Westminster, London. He is the youngest of three sons of portrait painter Dominick Elwes and Tessa Kennedy, an interior designer. Cary is the brother of artist Damian Elwes and film producers Cassian Elwes and half brother to Milica Kastner. Cary's stepfather, Elliott Kastner, was an American film producer and the first American to set up independent film production in the United Kingdom. Cary's paternal grandfather was the portrait painter Simon Elwes, whose own father was the diplomat and tenor Gervase Elwes (1866–1921).

One of Cary Elwes's relatives is John Elwes, a British miser who was considered to be the inspiration for Ebenezer Scrooge in A Christmas Carol (1843), having been referenced by Charles Dickens in chapter six of Our Mutual Friend. Elwes played five roles in the 2009 film adaptation of A Christmas Carol. Through his maternal grandfather, Elwes is also related to Sir Alexander William "Blackie" Kennedy, one of the first photographers to document the archaeological site of Petra following the collapse of the Ottoman Empire.

Elwes was brought up as a Catholic and was an altar boy at Westminster Cathedral. His paternal relatives include such clerics as Dudley Charles Cary-Elwes (1868–1932), the Bishop of Northampton, and Abbot Columba Cary-Elwes (Ampleforth Abbey, Saint Louis Abbey). He discussed this in an interview while he was filming the 2005 CBS television film Pope John Paul II, in which he played the young priest Karol Wojtyła.

Elwes's parents divorced when he was four years old. In 1975, when Elwes was 13, his father died by suicide. He was educated at Harrow School, and the London Academy of Music and Dramatic Art. In 1981, he moved to the United States to study acting at Sarah Lawrence College in Bronxville, New York. While living there, Elwes studied acting at both the Actors Studio and the Lee Strasberg Theatre and Film Institute under the tutelage of Al Pacino's mentor, Charlie Laughton (not to be confused with English actor Charles Laughton). As a teenager, he also worked as a production assistant on the films Absolution, Octopussy, and Superman, where he was assigned to Marlon Brando. When Elwes introduced himself to the actor, Brando insisted on calling him "Rocky" after Rocky Marciano.

== Career ==
=== 1984–1999 ===
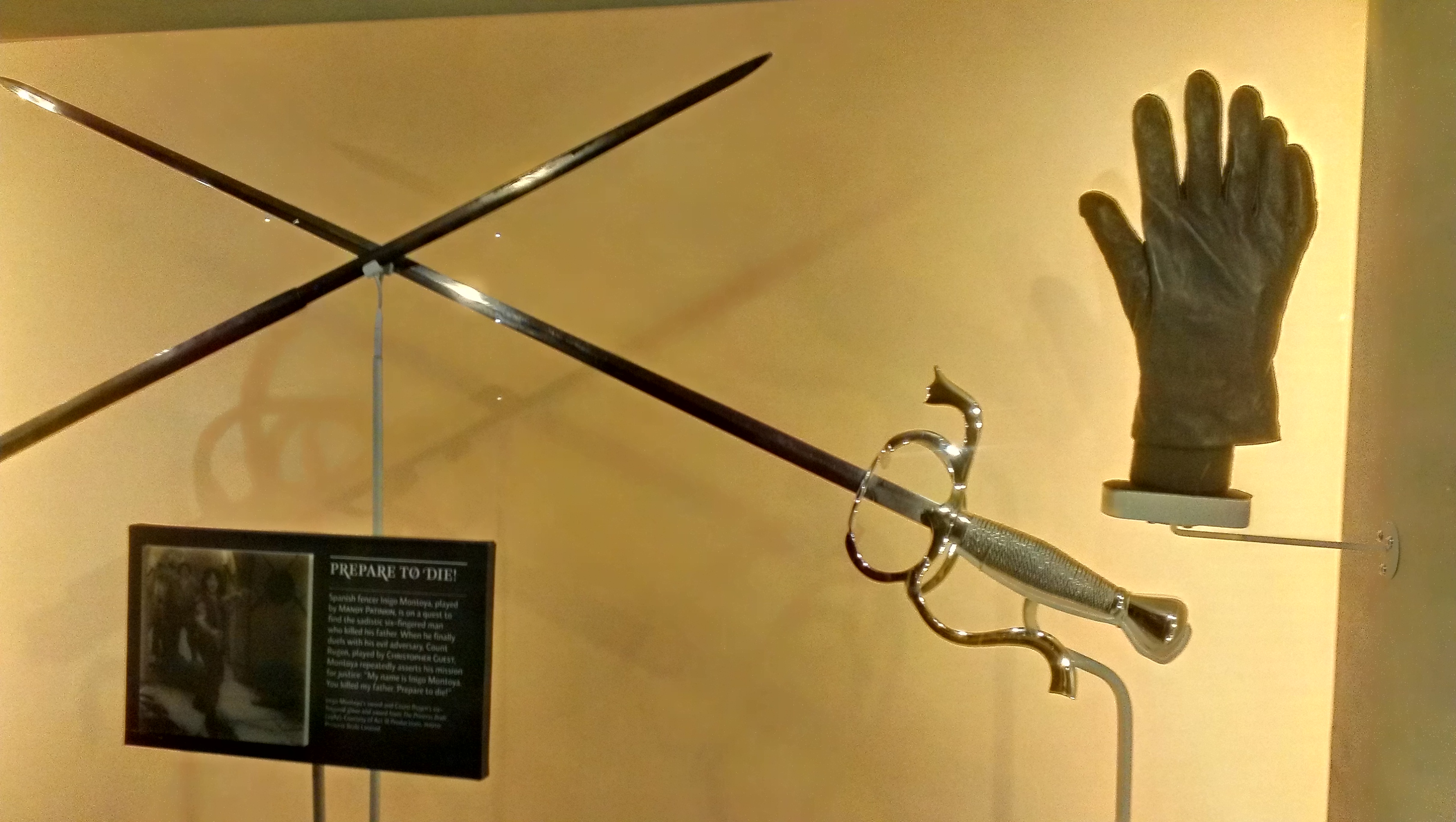
Props from the film The Princess Bride (1987)

Elwes made his acting debut in 1984 in Marek Kanievska's film Another Country, which was loosely based on the English boarding school exploits of British spies Burgess, Philby and MacLean. He played James Harcourt, a gay student. He then played Guilford Dudley in the British historical drama film Lady Jane, opposite Helena Bonham Carter. He was cast as stable-boy-turned-swashbuckler Westley in Rob Reiner's fantasy-comedy The Princess Bride (1987), which was based on the novel of the same name by William Goldman. It was a modest box office success, but received critical acclaim. As a result of years of reviews, it earned a score of 97% on the review aggregation website Rotten Tomatoes. Since being released on home video and television, the film has become a cult classic.

Initially the studio didn't know how to market it. Was it an adventure? A fantasy? A comedy? A romance? A kids' movie? In the end they sold it as a kids' movie and it largely had to rely on word of mouth ... people tell me they still have their VHS copy that has been passed down from one generation to the next.

— Interview from the film's DVD release in 2001

Elwes continued to work steadily, varying between dramatic roles, such as in the Oscar-winning Glory (1989) and comedic roles, as in Hot Shots! (1991). He played a rival driver to Tom Cruise in Days of Thunder (1990). In 1993, he starred as Robin Hood in Mel Brooks's comedy Robin Hood: Men in Tights. Elwes then appeared in supporting roles in such films as Francis Ford Coppola's adaptation of Bram Stoker's Dracula (1992), The Crush (1993), The Jungle Book (1994), Twister (1996), Liar Liar (1997), and Kiss the Girls. In 1999, he portrayed famed theatre and film producer John Houseman for Tim Robbins in his ensemble film based on Orson Welles's musical, Cradle Will Rock. Following that, he travelled to Luxembourg to work with John Malkovich and Willem Dafoe in Shadow of the Vampire.

Elwes made his first television appearance in 1996 as David Lukner on Seinfeld. Two years later he played astronaut Michael Collins in the Golden Globe Award–winning HBO miniseries From the Earth to the Moon. The following year Elwes was nominated for a Golden Satellite Award for Best Performance by an Actor in a Mini-Series or Motion Picture Made for Television for his portrayal of Colonel James Burton in The Pentagon Wars directed by Richard Benjamin. In 1999, he guest starred as Dr. John York in an episode of the television series The Outer Limits.

=== 2000–2009 ===
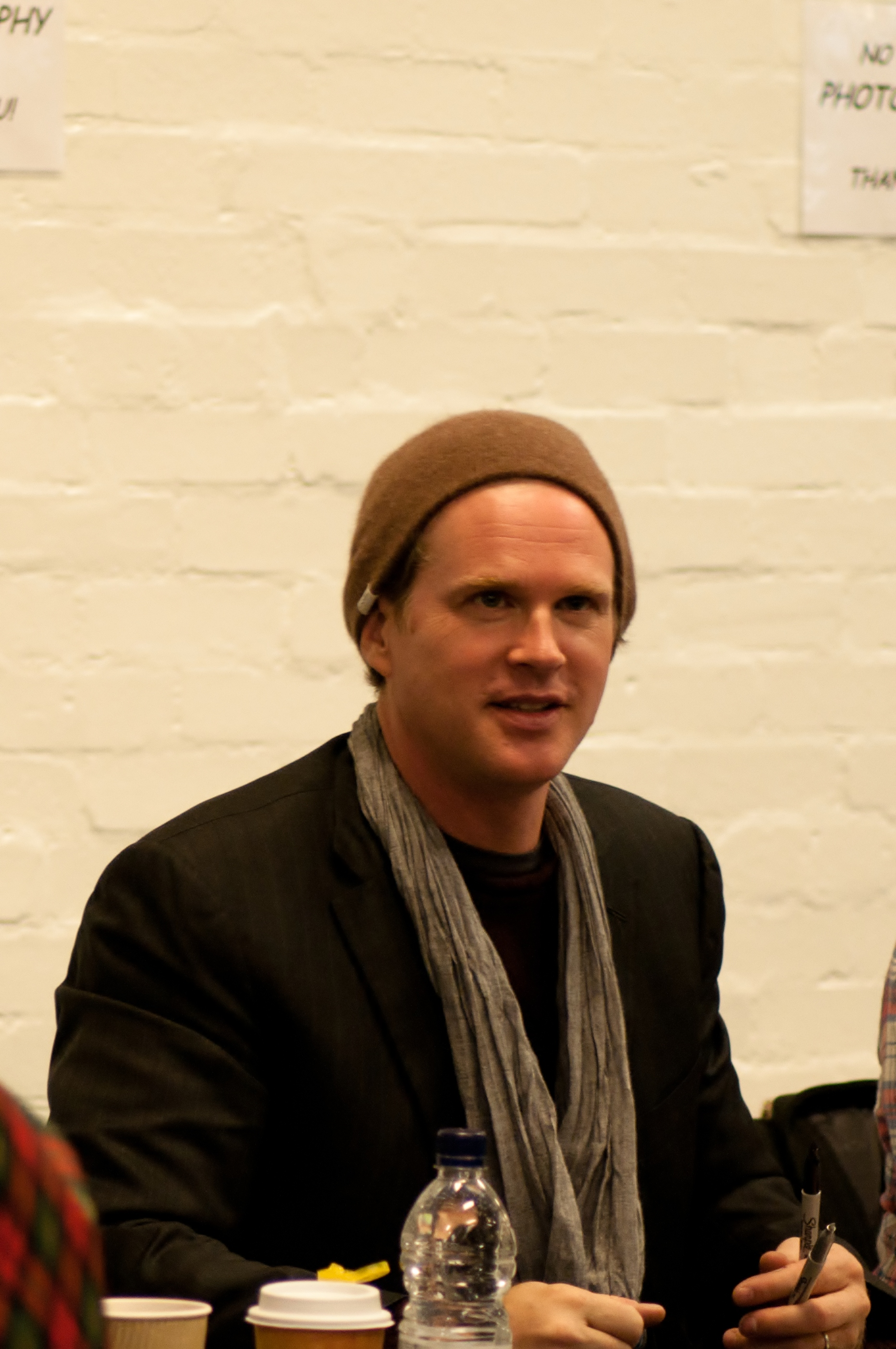
Elwes in 2010

In 2001, he co-starred in Peter Bogdanovich's ensemble film The Cat's Meow portraying film mogul Thomas Ince, who died mysteriously while vacationing with William Randolph Hearst on his yacht. Shortly afterward Elwes received another Golden Satellite Award nomination for his work on the ensemble NBC Television film Uprising opposite Jon Voight directed by Jon Avnet. Elwes had a recurring role in the final season (from 2001 to 2002) of Chris Carter's hit series The X-Files as FBI Assistant Director Brad Follmer. In 2003 Elwes portrayed Kerry Max Cook in the off-Broadway play The Exonerated in New York, directed by Bob Balaban (18–23 March 2003).

In 2004, Elwes starred as Dr. Lawrence Gordon in the horror–thriller Saw which, at a budget of a little over $1 million, grossed over $100 million worldwide. The same year he appeared in Ella Enchanted, this time as the villain, not the hero. Also in 2004, he portrayed serial killer Ted Bundy in the A&E Network film The Riverman, which became one of the highest rated original films in the network's history and garnered a prestigious BANFF Rockie Award nomination. The following year, Elwes played the young Karol Wojtyła in the CBS television film Pope John Paul II. The TV film was highly successful not only in North America but also in Europe, where it broke box office records in the late Pope's native Poland and became the first film ever to break $1 million in three days. He made an uncredited appearance as Sam Green, the man who introduced Andy Warhol to Edie Sedgwick, in the 2006 film Factory Girl. In 2007, he appeared in Garry Marshall's Georgia Rule opposite Jane Fonda.

In 2007, he made a guest appearance on the Law & Order: Special Victims Unit episode "Dependent" as a Mafia lawyer. In 2009, he played the role of Pierre Despereaux, an international art thief, in the fourth-season premiere of Psych. Also in 2009 Elwes joined the cast of Robert Zemeckis's motion capture adaptation of Charles Dickens's A Christmas Carol portraying five roles. That same year he was chosen by Steven Spielberg to appear in his motion capture adaptation of Belgian artist Hergé's popular comic strip The Adventures of Tintin: The Secret of the Unicorn. Elwes's voice-over work includes the narrator in James Patterson's audiobook The Jester, as well as characters in film and television animations such as Quest for Camelot, Pinky and the Brain, Batman Beyond, and the English versions of the Studio Ghibli films, Porco Rosso, Whisper of the Heart and The Cat Returns. For the 2004 video game The Bard's Tale, he served as screenwriter, improviser, and voice actor of the main character The Bard. In 2009, Elwes reunited with Jason Alexander for the Indian film, Delhi Safari. The following year Elwes portrayed the part of Gremlin Gus in Disney's video game, Epic Mickey 2: The Power of Two. In 2014, he appeared in Cosmos: A Spacetime Odyssey as the voice of scientists Edmond Halley and Robert Hooke.

=== 2010–present ===
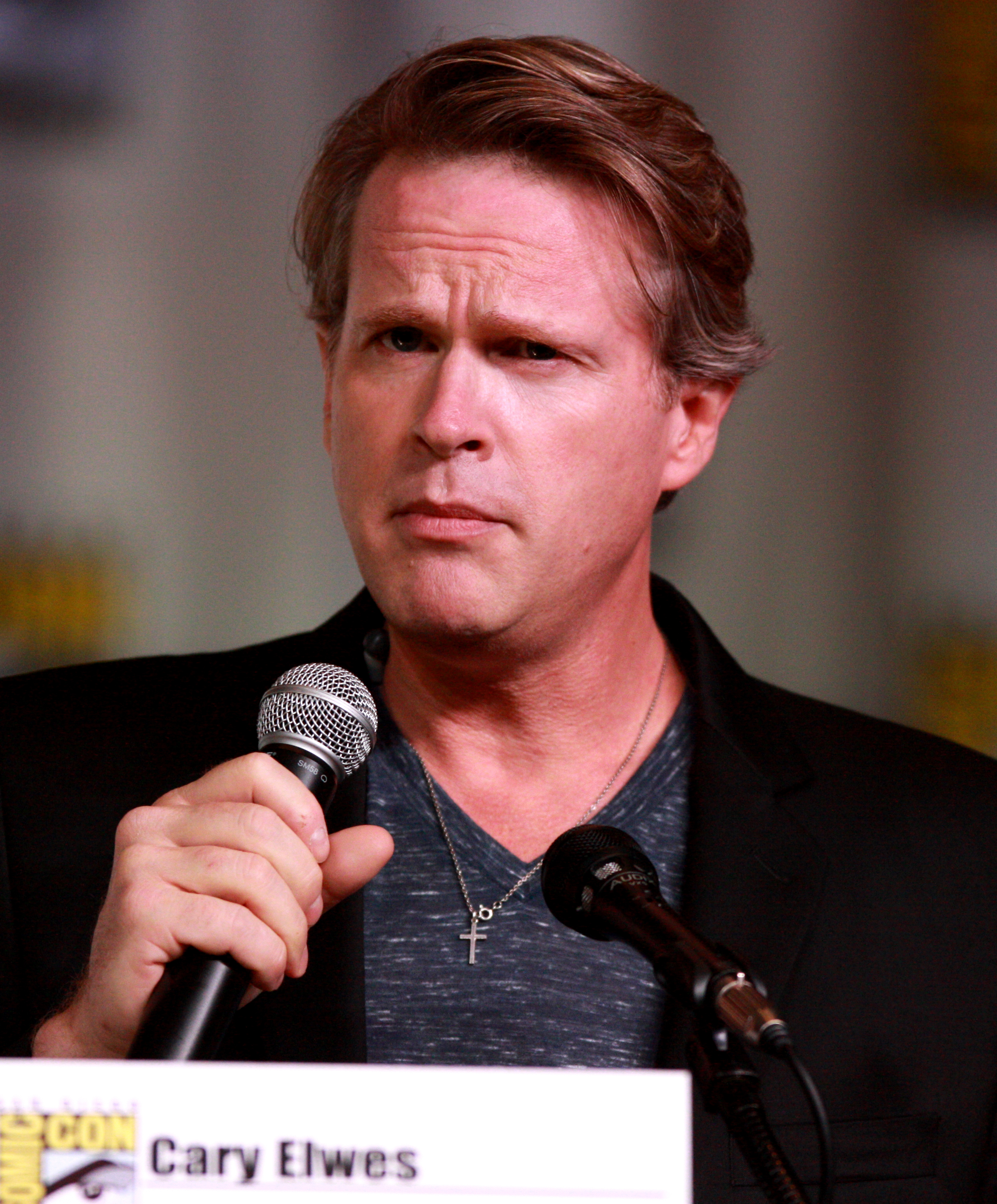
Elwes at Comic-Con in 2013

In 2010, he returned to the Saw franchise in Saw 3D (2010), the seventh film in the series, as Dr. Lawrence Gordon. In 2010, he returned to Psych, reprising his role in the second half of the fifth season, again in the show's sixth season, and again in the show's eighth season premiere. In 2014, Elwes played Hugh Ashmeade, Director of the CIA, in the second season of the BYU TV series Granite Flats. In 2011, he was selected by Ivan Reitman to star alongside Natalie Portman in No Strings Attached. That same year, Elwes and Garry Marshall teamed up again in the ensemble romantic comedy New Year's Eve opposite Robert De Niro and Halle Berry.

In 2012, Elwes starred in the independent drama The Citizen. and the following year Elwes joined Selena Gomez for the comedy ensemble, Behaving Badly directed by Tim Garrick. In 2015, he completed Sugar Mountain directed by Richard Gray; the drama We Don't Belong Here, opposite Anton Yelchin and Catherine Keener directed by Peer Pedersen, and Being Charlie which reunited Elwes with director Rob Reiner after 28 years and premiered at the Toronto International Film Festival. In 2016, Elwes starred opposite Penélope Cruz in Fernando Trueba's Spanish-language period pic The Queen of Spain, a sequel to Trueba's 1998 drama The Girl of Your Dreams. This also re-united Elwes with his Princess Bride co-star, Mandy Patinkin.

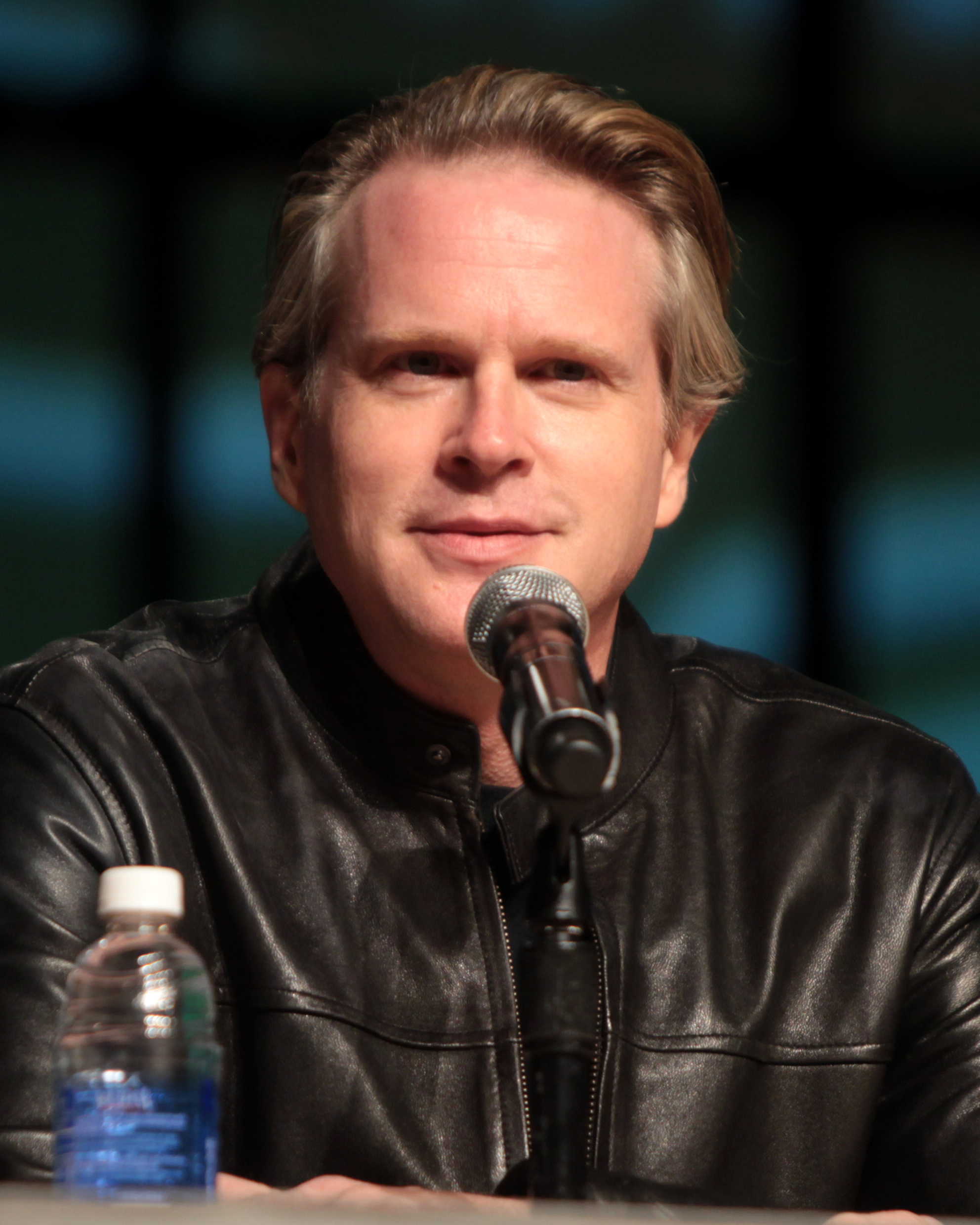
Elwes at the Phoenix Comicon in 2014

In October 2014 Touchstone (Simon & Schuster) published Elwes's memoir of the making of The Princess Bride, entitled As You Wish: Inconceivable Tales from the Making of The Princess Bride, which he co-wrote with Joe Layden. The book featured never-before-told stories, exclusive behind-the-scenes photographs, and interviews with co-stars Robin Wright, Wallace Shawn, Billy Crystal, Christopher Guest, Fred Savage and Mandy Patinkin, as well as screenwriter William Goldman, producer Norman Lear, and director Rob Reiner. The book debuted on The New York Times Best Seller list.

In 2014, Elwes co-wrote the screenplay for a film entitled Elvis & Nixon, about the pair's famous meeting at the White House in 1970. The film starred Michael Shannon and Kevin Spacey; it was bought by Amazon as their first theatrical feature and released on 22 April 2016. In May 2015, Elwes was cast as Arthur Davenport, a shrewd and eccentric world-class collector of illegal art and antiquities in Crackle's first streaming network series drama, The Art of More, which explored the cutthroat world of premium auction houses. The series debuted on 19 November and was picked up for a second season.

In April 2018 Elwes portrayed Larry Kline, mayor of Hawkins, for the third season of the Netflix series Stranger Things, which premiered in July 2019. He was nominated along with the cast for the Screen Actors Guild Award for Outstanding Performance by an Ensemble in a Drama Series. In May 2019, he joined the third season of the Amazon series The Marvelous Mrs. Maisel as Gavin Hawk.

== Personal life ==
Elwes met photographer Lisa Marie Kurbikoff in 1991 at a chili cook-off in Malibu, California; they were engaged in 1997. They married in 2000 and have one daughter. Elwes and his family lost their home in the Palisades Fire during the January 2025 Southern California wildfires, but evacuated safely.

In March 2021, Elwes posted on his social media accounts that his younger half-sister Milica had died after battling Stage 4 cancer for more than a year.

Elwes is known for his feud with Republican Texas Senator and Princess Bride fan Ted Cruz. According to the Hollywood Reporter, Elwes initiated the 2020 fundraiser that re-united many Princess Bride cast members to support Joe Biden in the battleground state of Wisconsin. The Princess Bride Reunion raised more than $4 million for Wisconsin Democrats.

=== Saw lawsuit ===
In August 2005, Elwes filed a lawsuit against Evolution Entertainment, his management firm and producer of Saw. Elwes said he was promised a minimum of 1% of the producers' net profits and did not receive the full amount. The case was settled out of court. Elwes returned to the series in 2010 reprising his role in Saw 3D.

== Awards and honors ==
Year	Association	Category	Project	Result	Ref.
1998	Blockbuster Entertainment Awards	Best Supporting Actor	Kiss the Girls	Nominated	
1999	Satellite Awards	Best Actor – Miniseries or Television Film	The Pentagon Wars	Nominated	
2002	Satellite Awards	Best Supporting Actor – Series, Miniseries or Television Film	Uprising	Nominated	
2005	MTV Movie Award	Best Frightened Performance	Saw	Nominated	
2020	Screen Actors Guild Award	Outstanding Ensemble in a Drama Series	Stranger Things	Nominated	
2023	Fargo Film Festival	Ted M. Larson Award	—	Honored	

== Works ==
- Elwes, Cary; Layden, Joe (2014). As You Wish: Inconceivable Tales from the Making of The Princess Bride. New York: Touchstone. ISBN 9781476764023. OCLC 878812649.
