= Tessa Kennedy =

British interior designer (born 1938)

- Born: 6 December 1938 (age 87); Guildford, England
- Occupation: Interior designer
- Years active: 1960s–present
- Spouses: Dominick Elwes (m. 1958; div. 1969); Elliott Kastner (m. 1971; div. 199?)
- Children: 5, including Cassian, Damian, and Cary

Tessa Georgina Kennedy (born 6 December 1938) is a British interior designer. Her elopement with society portrait painter Dominick Elwes made headlines in 1957.

== Early life and elopement ==
Kennedy is the daughter of Geoffrey Ferrar Kennedy, from a shipping magnate family, and Daška Ivanović, daughter of Ivan Rikard Ivanović. At age 19, Kennedy became a cause célèbre after she eloped with the painter Dominick Elwes. Kennedy met the 26-year-old Elwes and both desired marriage. Kennedy's parents, however, disapproved of the relationship and instituted wardship proceedings over their adult daughter.

On 27 November 1957, Geoffrey Kennedy obtained a restraining order against Elwes. However, the High Court Tipstaff was not authorized to apprehend Elwes in any place outside England and Wales. After attempting to wed in Scotland, while being pursued by the press, the young couple eloped to Havana, Cuba. Mobster Meyer Lansky provided accommodation for them at the Habana Riviera, and the couple were wed in a civil ceremony on 27 January 1958.

When Castro's revolution threatened the stability of the country, they were forced to flee aboard a ferry, the S.S. City of Havana which took them to Miami via Stock Island and Key West. From Miami the couple flew to New York, where they applied for a marriage license on 31 March. The following day, they were wed at the Manhattan Supreme Court. In early July, they returned to England aboard the SS Liberté. On 16 July, as the ship docked at Southampton, Elwes handed himself over to the authorities while waiting for charges against him to be heard. Elwes was eventually released from custody, but Kennedy was ordered to remain a ward of court.

== Career ==
After studying at the École des Beaux-Arts in Paris, Kennedy started her career in the 1960s at the London design firm of David Mlinaric, whose clients included Mick Jagger and Eric Clapton. In 1968, after spending three years working as partner with Mlinaric, she won a competition to design the Grosvenor House Hotel, launching her own company with Michael Sumner that same year. In 1986, she reformed as Tessa Kennedy Design, Ltd., a company which has won several design accolades. Her clients have included De Beers, Stanley Kubrick, George Harrison, King Hussein of Jordan and London hotels Claridge's, the Berkeley, and the Ritz for which she was voted Designer of the Year. Kennedy also renovated rooms at director Michael Winner's Woodland House.

A member of the British Interior Design Association (BIDA), Kennedy was the first woman to work in Saudi Arabia with her own company. Following two years as President of the International Society of Interior Designers in Britain and three years on the International Board, she made a Fellow of the International Interior Design Association (IIDA).

== Personal life ==
With Elwes, Kennedy had three sons: film producer Cassian Elwes, artist Damian Elwes and actor Cary Elwes. Kennedy and Elwes divorced in 1969. By her second husband, the Hollywood film producer Elliott Kastner (7 January 1930 – 30 June 2010), she has a son and a daughter, Dillon and Milica (d. 2021).

== Bibliography ==
- Hicks, David; Jenkins, Nicholas (1979). Living with Design. New York: Morrow. p. 287. ISBN 978-0688035013.
- Brown, Erica (1980). Interior Views: Design At Its Best. New York: Viking Press. ISBN 978-0670399789.
- Attallah, Naim (1987). Women. London: Quartet Books. ISBN 978-0704326255.
- Jacobson, Stuart E.; Lovi, Steve (1987). The Art of Giving. New York: Harry N Abrams Inc. p. 216. ISBN 978-0810918580.
- Spiegel: The Man Behind the Pictures by Andrew Sinclair. Weidenfeld and Nicolson (1987)
- Who's Who in Interior Design by Barons Who's Who (1988)
- The Decorator by Florence de Dampierre. Rizzoli (1989)
- ABC: The First Name in Entertainment by Allen Eyles. Burgess Hill Cinema Theatre Assoc. [U.A.] (1993)
- Empowered Spaces: Architects & Designers at Home and at Work by Carol Soucek King. Rizzoli (1993)
- The Bedroom by Diane Berger (photography by Fritz von der Schulenburg). Abbeyville Press (1995)
- Designing with Tile, Stone & Brick: The Creative Touch by Carol Soucek King. PBC International (1995)
- Classic Meets Contemporary by Fleur Rossdale & Henrietta Spencer-Churchill. Rizzoli (1998)
- Influential Interiors by Suzanne Trocmé. Clarkson Potter (1999)
- Domestic Bliss: Simple Ways to Add Style to Your Life by Rita Konig. Fireside (2003)
- Sam Spiegel by Natasha Fraser-Cavassoni. Simon and Schuster (2003)
- The New Curtain Book: Master-Classes with Today's Top Designers by Stephanie Hoppen & Fritz Von der Schulenburg. Allen & Unwin (2003)
- Almanac of Architecture & Design by James P Cramer & Jennifer Evans Yankopolus. Greenway Group, (2005)
- 100 Hotels & Resorts: Destinations that Lift the Spirit by Howard J. Wolff, Allison Wimberly, Tong & Goo. Images Pub. (2008)
