= Vakki =

South Korean artist

- Education: Royal Academy of Art, The Hague, Hongik University
- Known for: Video art, performance, installation art

Vakki (Korean: 빠키) is a South Korean artist who runs "Papapapa Tamguso". Based on visual art, it is exploring various media such as stereoscopic installation, spatial art, and video work. Vakki is actively showing exhibitions at the National Museum of Modern and Contemporary Art, Paik Nam-joon Art Center, Daelim Museum's guseulmoa, Seoul Museum of Art, and Arco Art Theater, and many showcases, groups, and individual exhibitions have been held overseas in Berlin, Thailand, and New York. In addition, the field of visual arts is expanding by showing the writer's pleasant visual language through collaboration with cultural and artistic spaces, commercial brands, and fashion designers.

Vakki was selected for the MMCA’s 2020 artist residency program and presented works that collaborated with the Seoul Metropolitan Government. In September 2021, Vakki also collaborated with Shake Shek to introduce "Urban Playground". LG Electronics chose Vakki as a visual artist to highlight the color of the OLED display and emphasize its differentiation from other displays, and exhibited the work on Media Wall.

== Education ==
M.A, The Royal School of Arts, Hague, Holland

M.A, Interaction Design at the Hongik University Graduate School of Film and Digital Media, Seoul, Korea

== Works ==
Vakki's works were installed in Apple's Myeong-dong store, which is the only store in the world to collect artists' works.

Collaborated with Gangneung Seamark Hotel 'Vakki & SiSi SoSO Play Kit'

Designed a complex cultural space for Seoul Tourism Foundation and the Gwanak Cultural Foundation

Participated in Yangjae-daero Street Art Gallery

Participated in the "Aqua Heaven" exhibition organized by the National Asian Cultural Center (ACC)

BTS RM visited Vakki's exhibition Incomplete Device with Guseulmoa Dang-gu-jang at Daelim Museum for shooting with Vogue Korea

== Exhibitions ==
=== Solo exhibitions ===
2020:

- Circulation, Orbit, Generate, UARTSPACE, Seoul, Korea

2018

- Movements, Atelier Han, Sokcho, Korea

2017

- InOutOutOutIn, Almostnotdone, Amsterdam, Netherland

2016

- Walk through the forest of conscious Instrument, ‘Heterotopia’ (Act Festival), National Asia Culture Center

2015

- Unstable Instruments: Play Play, Daelim Museum Project Space
- A Caterpillar Passing an Apple, Chelsea Market. New York

2014

- Plus Plus, Collage Plus
- Ready, Made, W HOTEL Media Exhibition
- Psytrance Traveller, Blank 425 Gallery
- Center Nabi ‘Como’ Exhibition, SK Tower

=== Group exhibitions ===
2018 < Sensing Shipyard >, Sonic Acts Festival, Amsterdam, Netherlands

< NOITITEPER >, De Fabriek, Eindhoven, Netherlands.

< Dancing with Lights and Images > Media Art Exhibition, Sung Nam Art Center Gallery 808, Sung Nam, Korea

< Sounds x Hangeul > Variation of the Korean Alphabet, National Hangeul Museum, Seoul, Korea

< Riverrun: Interface of the unstable body >, the Place, London, UK

< Variations >, ArtLoft, Brussels, Belgium.

< Hyper Narrative >, Meta Gallery, Monte-Carlo, Monaco

2017 The 5th International Typography Biennale, Culture Station Seoul 284

2016 <Wrap Around the Time>: Remembrance Exhibition of Nam June Paik, Nam June Paik Art Centre

<Playart_Art via Games>, Suwon I Park Museum of Art

<Japchinda> Graphic Magazine issue

<Mode & Moments> 100 Years of Korean Fashion, Vogue Korea 20th Anniversary Exhibition

2015 <Plastic Myths>, National Asia Culture Center

<Riverrun: Dizziness of Flowing River>, International Performance Arts Festival, Arko Art Center.

<Light> Exhibition for the 4th anniversary of Yangpyeong Art Museum.

<Cocoon>Space K.

<Landscape> Danwon Art Museum.

<Beyond Closed Space> Taehwa Eco River Art Festival.

<Cloth> Amado Art Space.

<Citizen's Playground> National Assembly of the Republic of Korea.

<Spread in heaven> Samtan Art Mine Museum

International Environment Art Festival 2015, Public Art in Busan

2014 <Dokkeabi Iteawon Market Project>

1st Annual Group Exhibition at Seoul Museum of Art, Seoul

<Tree of Hallucination> Modern Art Exhibition, Seoul Arts Center

<You came back and I started turning.> Jangheung Art Park, Ghana Art Center

<Stage of bag> Gallery0914

<Air Everywhere> NWS

<Rock Star Exhibition> Mudaeruk

<Power Power Unit> DDP Opening Permanent Exhibition
