= Simon Elwes =

British war artist and portrait painter (1902–1975)

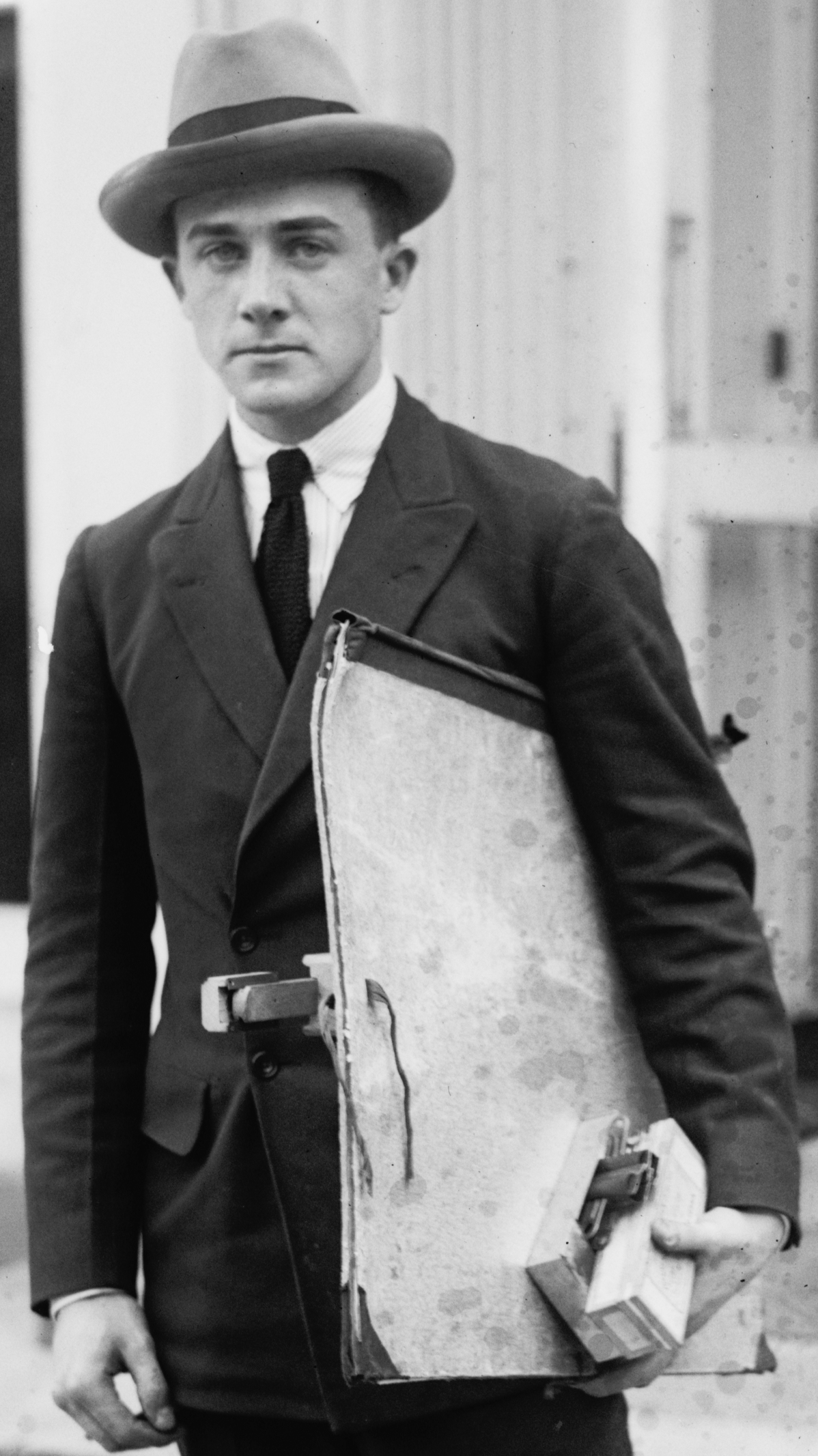
- Elwes leaving the White House after completing sketches of President Harding. (Photo by Harris & Ewing, Inc. 1922)
- Born: Simon Edmund Vincent Paul Elwes; 29 June 1902; Theddingworth, Leicestershire, England
- Died: 6 August 1975 (aged 73); Amberley, West Sussex, England
- Education: Slade School of Fine Art; Académie Delécluse; Academie des Beaux Arts; Académie Andre Lhote
- Known for: Portrait painting
- Spouse: Gloria Elwes
- Children: 4, including Dominick
- Parent(s): Gervase Elwes; Lady Winifride Feilding
- Awards: RA, RP
- Patrons: Queen Elizabeth The Queen Mother

Simon Edmund Vincent Paul Elwes, RP, RA, KM (29 June 1902 – 6 August 1975) was a British war artist and society portrait painter whose patrons included presidents, kings, queens, statesmen, sportsmen, prominent social figures and many members of the British royal family. He was a favourite of Queen Elizabeth The Queen Mother.

== Biography ==
Elwes (pronounced "El-wez") was born on 29 June 1902 at Hothorpe Hall in Northamptonshire (also near Theddingworth, Leicestershire), the sixth and youngest son (two daughters were born later) of famed tenor Gervase Cary Elwes (1866–1921), and his wife, Lady Winifride Mary Elizabeth Feilding, daughter of the 8th Earl of Denbigh. Simon was the scion of the recusant Cary-Elwes family, of which many branches are known simply as "Elwes", which includes noted British monks and bishops, such as Abbot Columba Cary-Elwes, Bishop of Northampton Dudley Cary-Elwes and Father Luke Cary-Elwes. Simon's niece, Polly Elwes, was a television personality in Britain. Two of Simon's grandsons are the English actor Cary Elwes and English artist Luke Elwes.

Simon Elwes' mother was so determined to have a painter in the family she studied art and herself started painting while pregnant. For his education Elwes first attended two Catholic schools, Ladycross School in Seaford and the Oratory School in Edgbaston. In 1918, at the age of sixteen, he was taken out of the Oratory and installed in the Slade School of Fine Art where Henry Tonks and Philip Wilson Steer taught. After the Slade Elwes spent eight years in Paris, first at the Académie Delécluse and then at the Academie des Beaux Arts. While there he met a Belgian refugee, Mme. La Forge, who aroused his latent interest in painting. La Forge gave him the run of her studio and encouraged him to start again where he had left off. In 1920, Elwes began studying in earnest at Andre Lhote's Academy in Montparnasse, Paris. Fellow students included Henri Cartier-Bresson, Conrad O'Brien-ffrench and Elena Mumm Thornton Wilson. While in Paris Elwes did a black and white drawing of the Irish tenor and recording artist, John McCormack. McCormack would say to his wife of Elwes: "This lad has remarkable talent and will do big things, mark my words." From France Elwes visited art galleries in Germany, the Netherlands and Italy. In 1922, Elwes sailed to New York, having borrowed the fare. He repaid the loan by doing charcoal drawings at $5 to $20 apiece. During this visit he managed to draw President Harding from life. In 1926, he returned to England and on 25 November married the Hon. Gloria Elinor Rodd (born 1901), the daughter of the diplomat and scholar, Rennell Rodd, 1st Baron Rennell.

== Career ==
After his return from New York a period of undistinguished hard work followed until his portrait of Mrs. James Montgomery Beck Jr. (née Mary Ridgely Carter) was hung at the Royal Academy of Arts in 1930. A flood of orders followed the next day and continued to do so. The following year Elwes showed another portrait at the Academy of Lady Lettice Lygon, the first of many aristocratic sitters that would include many of Britain's royal family. Thereafter, his portraits hung in the summer exhibition of the Royal Academy every year. From London's Mayfair to Manhattan's Park Avenue Elwes soon began to establish himself as a stylish, sought-after portraitist. In 1929, Elwes was created a Knight of Malta and four years later was elected a member of the Royal Society of Portrait Painters. In 1930, Elwes was invited to paint Robert Baden-Powell founder of the Scout movement. When asked by the artist in a letter how he would like to pose for this, Baden-Powell replied:

My suggestion that I should be 'doing something' when sitting to you has a twofold meaning underlying it. One (entirely selfish) is that it is difficult for me to sit still and do nothing when I have so much on hand to do. Secondly, I (in common with many others) feel that (though it is very usual with portraits) to hand down to one's successors the representation of a man staring vacantly into space with hands lying idle, does not give a true picture of an active worker.

That same year he painted a portrait of the Hon. Lady Aitken. A year later his portrait of the Hon. Mrs. Roger Chetwode was one of nine portraits chosen to be exhibited at the Royal Society of Portrait Painters 45th Annual Show. In 1936, Elwes was commissioned to paint the then Duke of York, in uniform as colonel-in-chief of the 11th Hussars. That December he was commissioned by the new King to paint himself and the Queen, of whom Elwes said, "No couple ever was more popular in England, even before this happened". Two years later he was commissioned to paint another royal portrait of Queen Mary. In December 1938, an exhibition of his work was held at the M. Knoedler & Co. Gallery at 14 East 57th Street in Manhattan which included that portrait.

== Second World War ==
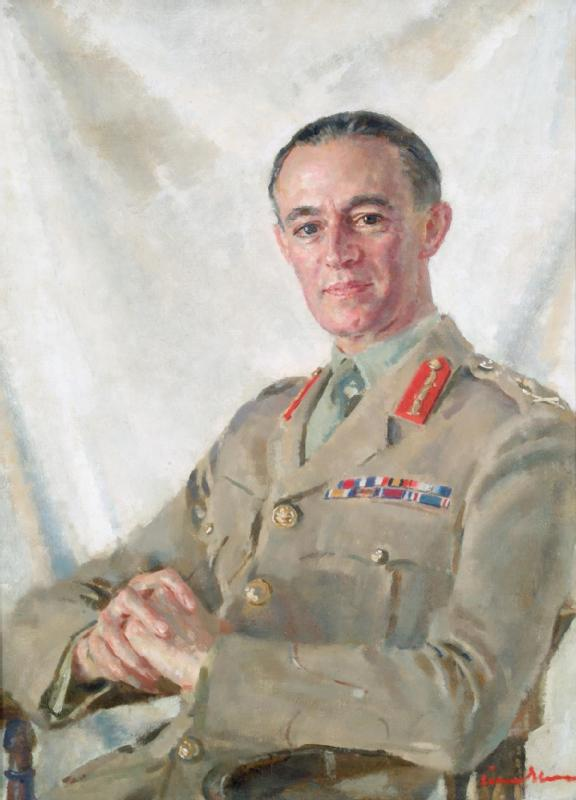
Lieutenant General R G W H Stone CB, DSO, MC, FRGS (1942) by Simon Elwes

At the outbreak of the Second World War, Elwes initially joined the Welsh Guards. He was later transferred to the 10th Royal Hussars; he was stationed in North Africa and Egypt serving as a lieutenant colonel. After fighting in the battles of Benghazi, Mersa Matruh and Knightsbridge, he was made an official war artist by the local army command. His role as a war artist was recognized when the War Artists' Advisory Committee purchased several of his works. Whilst stationed in Cairo in 1942 he painted portraits of King Farouk, his wife Queen Farida, their daughter Princess Ferial, and General (later Field Marshal) Sir Henry Maitland Wilson, General Officer Commanding (GOC) British Troops in Egypt. In South Africa, he painted the portraits of Paul I of the Hellenes, his wife Frederica of Hanover as well as Prime Minister J. C. Smuts and his wife. He painted two other field marshals: Sir Claude Auchinleck and in India, Viceroy Archibald Wavell. While there he did portraits of the Maharaja of Patiala, Lord Mountbatten, and various Indian Army soldiers who had won the Victoria Cross, namely Naik Nand Singh, 11th Sikh Regiment; Havildar Gaje Ghale, 5th Royal Gurkha Rifles; Company Havildar Major Chellu Ram, 4/6 Rajputana Rifles; Major Premindra Singh Bhagat, 21st Bombay Sappers and Havildar Parkash Singh, 8th Punjab Regiment. In Delhi, Elwes also gave art lessons sponsored by Lady Wavell (wife of the Viceroy) at the Viceregal Palace. Other instructors included American war artist Millard Sheets.

== Stroke and Fountains Abbey ==
In 1945, Elwes suffered a near-fatal stroke which paralysed the right half of his face and body, including his painting hand. He was diagnosed with hemiplegia. Believing that he was about to die, Elwes received the last sacraments. He spent two years in hospital recuperating and after receiving treatment from renowned physiotherapist Berta Bobath, was soon able to stand with the aid of a cane. During his recovery, Elwes said that he repeatedly dreamed of the ruins of Fountains Abbey which he had visited in 1933. In the dream he saw the abbey restored and himself talking with one of the monks who kept saying: "It was built for God; it must be returned to God." Elwes became convinced that God had ruined him physically because he had wasted his talent and that he had been chosen to restore the abbey and rededicate it as a monastery. Although he never accomplished his dream, Elwes enlisted the aid of the Duke of Norfolk, Cardinal Spellman, the Marchioness of Lothian, novelist Evelyn Waugh, Lord Lovat and many of Britain's leading Catholic laymen.

== Later years ==
He never regained the use of his right hand, but taught himself to paint with his left surmounting his disability enough to become president of the Guild of Catholic Artists, and vice-president of the Royal Society of Portrait Painters from 1953 to 1957. In 1947, he visited Hollywood and painted a number of movie stars including Gloria Swanson and Bert Lahr. He had become enough of a celebrity himself that in 1949, whilst bedridden in the South of France after suffering a stroke, former British Prime Minister Winston Churchill told Lord Beaverbrook:

I think I shall stay here for four or five days. Then ... I would like to paint with Simon Elwes.

In 1953, Elwes was commissioned by Queen Elizabeth to paint the 1948 investiture of her daughter, then Princess Elizabeth with the Order of the Garter by her father King George VI. The next year he would paint a full-length portrait of the Queen, which remains part of the Royal Collection at Windsor Castle. In 1956, Elwes was appointed an associate of the Royal Academy. Besides the Queen he painted King George VI, Princess Margaret and the Duchess of Kent and by 1960, had painted every member of the Royal Family except the Duke of Windsor. Elwes also received a large commission by Viscount Camrose to do a conversation piece of leading members of White's club, of which he was a member. The sitters were Lord Birkenhead, Douglas Fairbanks Jr., David Stirling, Evelyn Waugh and the Duke of Devonshire set in the coffee room of the club. In 1960, Elwes joined an exhibition of other portraitists at the Portraits, Inc. gallery on West 51st St. in Manhattan.

In 1963, he held an exhibition of his work at the Palm Beach Galleries which included portraits of the Hon. John Hay Whitney, (a former ambassador to the Court of St. James's), Eleanor Robson Belmont, Madame Alain Bertrand, Mr. & Mrs. John S. Borden, Mrs. Henry Pomeroy Davison, William Cox Wright and Randolph Churchill.

In 1967, Elwes was made a full member of the Royal Academy. One observer, who witnessed him there in his later years, recalled: "Handsome, fresh of complexion, finely dressed, with a scarlet flower in his buttonhole, he enriched the proceedings with his smile, no less than with his air of being a visitor from a world more carefree and elegant than the one in which deficits and disappointments were certain to be discussed." Many of Elwes' paintings can be found in museums, palaces and academies around the world. Some of his early sketches form part of Mark Birley's private collection at Annabel's nightclub in Berkeley Square.

In the last months of his life, he had to be pushed about in a wheelchair and was hardly able to speak. Even though his face had grown thinner and paler, he had a look of the greatest nobility. Elwes died on 6 August 1975, in Amberley, West Sussex. He and his wife Gloria had four sons, Peter, father of painter Luke Elwes, Giles, who died in infancy, Tim and Dominick, who died one month after his father. Simon Elwes' wife died in October of that year.
