= List of films impacted by the COVID-19 pandemic =

This article lists films which have had their theatrical releases cancelled, resulting in an alternative method of release, as well as films with delayed releases due to the COVID-19 pandemic. The article also lists productions which have been directly affected by the pandemic, resulting in their suspension or delay.

== Theatrical releases ==
=== Simultaneous theatrical and video on demand (VOD) releases ===
==== North American theatrical releases ====
Film	Method of release
About Fate	Released in theaters and VOD on September 9, 2022.
The Addams Family 2	Released in theaters and VOD on October 1, 2021.
After Ever Happy	Released in theaters worldwide and the United States on September 7, 2022, and VOD on September 23.
After Everything	Released in theaters worldwide on September 13, 2023, and in the United States for two nights only on September 13–14, as part of Fathom Events. Later released digitally on October 3.
After We Collided	Released in theaters worldwide and Canada on September 18, 2020, and VOD in the United States on October 23. (Note: This film was delayed from its original October 2, 2020 release.)
After We Fell	Released in theaters worldwide and the United States on September 30, 2021. Later released digitally on October 19.
Alone Together	Released in theaters on July 22, 2022, and VOD on July 29.
Ambulance	Released in theaters in North America on April 8, 2022. (Note: This film was delayed from its original February 18, 2022 release.) Later released digitally on May 23.
Army of the Dead	Released in theaters on May 14, 2021, and on Netflix on May 21.
As They Made Us	Released in theaters and VOD on April 8, 2022.
Barb and Star Go to Vista Del Mar	Released on VOD on February 12, 2021. (Note: This film was delayed from an original July 31, 2020 theatrical release.) Later reissued at Alamo Drafthouse Cinema beginning September 12 in Los Angeles and nationwide on September 19.
The Beatles: Get Back	Released as a three-part documentary series on Disney+ on November 25, 26, and 27, 2021. Later reissued as a film in IMAX on January 30, 2022. (Note: Originally scheduled for September 4, 2020 release but it was delayed to August 27, 2021 theatrical release.)
Becky	Released in select theaters, drive-in theaters, and VOD on June 12, 2020. (Note: Later released in theaters in select countries with relaxed COVID-19 restrictions.)
Being the Ricardos	Released in limited theaters on December 10, 2021, and on Amazon Prime Video on December 21.
Bill & Ted Face the Music	Released in select theaters and VOD on August 28, 2020.
Birds of Prey	Released in North America as planned on February 7, 2020. Later released digitally on March 24.
Black Adam	Released in theaters worldwide and the United States on October 21, 2022. Later released on VOD on November 22 and on HBO Max on December 16.
Black Widow	Released in theaters and on Disney+ with Premier Access on July 9, 2021. (Note: This film was delayed three times from its original May 1, 2020 release, then delayed to November 6, 2020 and then further to May 7, 2021.)
Blithe Spirit	Released on the Sky Cinema channel on January 15, 2021, and in select theaters in the United States on February 18.
The Bloodhound	It was to be released at the Emergence Film Festival but was canceled due to the COVID-19 pandemic. The film was later purchased to be distributed by Arrow Films.
Bloodshot	Released in North America as planned on March 13, 2020. However, it was released digitally earlier than usual on March 27 due to theater closures. (Note: Delayed in China until July 24, 2020.)
Blue Beetle	Released in theaters on August 18, 2023, and VOD on September 26.
Bo Burnham: Inside	Released on Netflix on May 30, 2021, and in select theaters in the United States on July 22.
The Boss Baby: Family Business	Released in theaters and on Peacock on July 2, 2021. (Note: This film was pushed forward from its original March 26, 2021 release date until its subsequent delayed date of September 17, 2021.)
The Call of the Wild	Released in North America as planned on February 21, 2020, and later released digitally on March 27. (Note: This film was delayed from its original December 25, 2019 release, but this change of date occurred before the pandemic.)
Children of the Corn	Released in theaters on March 3, 2023, and VOD on March 21.
Cinderella	Released on Prime Video in various countries, in select North American theaters, and in Chinese cinemas on September 3, 2021. (Note: This film was delayed from its original February 5, 2021 release date and then until July 16, 2021 before its wide theatrical release ultimately being cancelled.)
Clifford the Big Red Dog	Released in theaters and on Paramount+ on November 10, 2021. (Note: This film was delayed twice from its original April 8, 2016 release date until the planned November 13, 2020 date. Also, this film was due to release in Toronto International Film Festival on September 17, 2021, but it was pulled off from the festival due to the rising cases of SARS-CoV-2 Delta variant.)
The Color Purple	Released in theaters on December 25, 2023, and VOD on January 16, 2024.
Come Away	Released in select theaters and VOD on November 13, 2020.
The Comeback Trail	Released in limited theaters and on VOD on February 25, 2025.
The Conjuring: The Devil Made Me Do It	Released in theaters and on HBO Max on June 4, 2021. (Note: As part of a decision by WarnerMedia, this Warner Bros. Pictures film is scheduled to be released both theatrically and on HBO Max in the United States from December 25, 2020, to December 31, 2021.) (Note: This film was delayed from its original September 11, 2020 release.)
Cruella	Released in theaters and on Disney+ with Premier Access on May 28, 2021. (Note: This film was delayed from its original December 23, 2020 release, but this change of date occurred before the pandemic.)
Demonic	Released in theaters on August 20, 2021, and VOD on August 27.
Desperation Road	Released in theaters and VOD on October 6, 2023.
Devotion	Released in theaters on November 23, 2022, and on Paramount+ on January 8, 2023. (Note: This film was delayed from its original October 14, 2022 release date for limited theatrical release.)
Don't Look Up	Released in theaters on December 10, 2021, and on Netflix on December 24.
Downton Abbey: A New Era	Released in theaters in the U.K. on April 29, 2022, and in North America on May 20. Later released on Peacock on June 24.
Dune	Released in theaters and on HBO Max on October 22, 2021. (Note: This film was delayed from its original November 20, 2020 release date to a planned December 18, 2020 release.)
Emancipation	Released in theaters in North America on December 2, 2022, and on Apple TV+ on December 9.
Emma	Released in North America as planned on February 21, 2020. However, it was released digitally earlier than usual on March 20 due to theater closures.
Encanto	Released in theaters in North America on November 24, 2021, and Disney+ on December 24.
The Equalizer 3	Released in theaters on September 1, 2023, and VOD on October 3.
Every Breath You Take	Released in select American theaters and VOD on April 2, 2021.
Everybody's Talking About Jamie	Released in select American theaters on September 10, 2021, and released in Chinese theaters and on Prime Video in various countries on September 17.
The Exorcist: Believer	Released in theaters on October 6, 2023, and VOD on October 24.
Expend4bles	Released in theaters on September 22, 2023, and VOD on October 13.
F9	Released in theaters in North America on June 25, 2021. Later released digitally on July 30.
Fall	Released in theaters on August 12, 2022. Later released digitally on September 27.
Fantastic Beasts: The Secrets of Dumbledore	Released in theaters worldwide on April 6, 2022, on April 8 in the United Kingdom, and on April 15 in the United States and VOD and HBO Max on May 30. (Note: The film was delayed from its original November 12, 2021 release, then moved to July 15, 2022 and later pushed forward three months early April 15, 2022. Multiple sources: Rebecca Rubin (November 6, 2020). "'Fantastic Beasts 3' Release Date Delayed to 2022". Variety. Archived from the original on November 6, 2020.; Rebecca Rubin (November 9, 2020). "'Fantastic Beasts 3' Sets New Release Date". Variety. Archived from the original on November 11, 2020.; Aaron Crouch (September 22, 2021). ""Fantastic Beasts: The Secrets of Dumbledore' Sets New 2022 Release Date". The Hollywood Reporter. Archived from the original on September 22, 2021.)
Fantasy Island	Released in theaters on February 14, 2020. Later released digitally on April 14.
Fast X	Released in theaters on May 19, 2023, and VOD on June 9.
Fatima	Released in select theaters and VOD on August 28, 2020. (Note: This film was delayed twice from its original April 24, 2020 release.) Later reissued in AMC Theatres on May 7, 2021.
Firestarter	Released in theaters and on Peacock on May 13, 2022.
First Cow	Had limited release on March 6, 2020, but was later pulled by A24 and released on VOD on July 10, 2020.
Five Nights at Freddy's	Released in theaters and on Peacock on October 27, 2023.
The Flash	Released in theaters on June 16, 2023, and VOD on July 18. Later released on Max on August 25.
Freaky	Released in select theaters on November 13, 2020, and VOD on December 4.
The Gentlemen	Released in North America as planned on January 24, 2020. Later released digitally on March 24.
Glass Onion: A Knives Out Mystery	Released in theaters on November 23, 2022, and on Netflix on December 23.
Godzilla vs. Kong	Released in theaters and on HBO Max on March 31, 2021. (Note: This film was pushed forward from its original May 29, 2020 release to a planned November 20, 2020 release, before its subsequent delay to May 21, 2021.)
Gran Turismo	Released in theaters on August 25, 2023, and VOD on September 26.
The Gray Man	Released in limited theaters on July 15, 2022, and on Netflix on July 22.
Halloween Ends	Released in theaters and on Peacock on October 14, 2022. (Note: This film was delayed from its original October 15, 2021 release.)
Halloween Kills	Released in theaters and on Peacock on October 15, 2021. (Note: This film was delayed from its original October 16, 2020 release.)
Hamilton	Released on Disney+ on July 3, 2020. Later released in theaters on September 5, 2025.
Happiest Season	Released on Hulu in the United States on November 25, 2020, and in theaters in Canada and other select countries on November 26.
The High Note	Released in select theaters, drive-in theaters, and VOD on May 29, 2020.
Honk for Jesus. Save Your Soul.	Released in theaters and on Peacock on September 2, 2022.
Hotel Transylvania: Transformania	Released on Prime Video in various countries on January 14, 2022, and in limited theaters in the United States on February 25. Later released in theaters in China on April 3. (Note: This film was delayed from its original December 22, 2021 release date before being pushed forward to August 6, 2021 July 23, 2021 and then until October 1, 2021 before its wide theatrical release was ultimately cancelled.)
The Hunger Games: The Ballad of Songbirds & Snakes	Released in theaters on November 17, 2023, and VOD on December 19.
The Hunt	Released in North America as planned on March 13, 2020. However, it was released digitally earlier than usual on March 20 due to theater closures. (Note: This film was delayed from its original September 27, 2019 release to an unknown release date at the time following the studio's response to such respective massacres of Philadelphia, Dayton, KyotoAni, El Paso, and Gilroy given said film's subject matter, however an official release date was confirmed over a month later. This change of date occurred before the pandemic.)
I Still Believe	Released in North America as planned on March 13, 2020. However, it was released digitally earlier than usual on March 27 due to theater closures.
In the Heights	Released in theaters and on HBO Max on June 10, 2021. (Note: This film was delayed from its original June 26, 2020 release, to a June 18, 2021 release, before being moved up by a week.)
Infamous	Released in select theaters, drive-in theaters, and VOD on June 12, 2020.
Insidious: The Red Door	Released in theaters on July 7, 2023, and VOD on August 1.
The Invisible Man	Released in North America as planned on February 28, 2020. However, it was released digitally earlier than usual on March 20 due to theater closures. (Note: Released in China delayed to December 4, 2020.)
Irresistible	Released in select theaters, drive-in theaters, and VOD on June 26, 2020.
Jackass Forever	Released in theaters on February 4, 2022, and on Paramount+ 45 days later. (Note: This film was delayed from its original March 5, 2021 release, then to a July 2, 2021 then to a September 3, 2021 date, and then an October 22, 2021 date.)
Jane	Released in theaters on August 26, 2022, and on Creator+ on September 16.
John and the Hole	It was to be released at the 2020 Cannes Film Festival, but it was not shown at the festival due to its cancellation. The producers chose not to sell the film to distributors, and ended up being presented at the 2021 Sundance Film Festival and then released in theaters and VOD on August 6, 2021, by IFC Films.
Judas and the Black Messiah	Released in theaters and on HBO Max on February 12, 2021. (Note: This film was delayed from its original August 21, 2020 release.)
Jungle Cruise	Released in theaters and on Disney+ with Premier Access on July 30, 2021. (Note: This film was delayed twice from its original October 11, 2019 release date until the planned July 30, 2021 date.)
King Richard	Released in theaters and on HBO Max on November 19, 2021. (Note: This film was delayed from its original November 25, 2020 release.)
Little Fish	Released in select theaters and VOD on February 5, 2021.
Love and Monsters	Released in select theaters and VOD in the United States on October 16, 2020. Later released on Netflix worldwide on April 14, 2021.
Luca	Released on Disney+ in North America and re-opened theaters in select countries on June 18, 2021. (Note: The film was also simultaneously shown at the El Capitan Theatre in Hollywood for a limited engagement lasting from June 18–24, 2021.) Later released in North American theaters on March 22, 2024.
Luck	Released in select theaters and on Apple TV+ on August 5, 2022.
Madame Web	Released in theaters on February 14, 2024, and VOD on March 15.
Malignant	Released in theaters and on HBO Max on September 10, 2021. (Note: This film was delayed from its original August 14, 2020 release.)
The Many Saints of Newark	Released in theaters and on HBO Max on October 1, 2021. (Note: This film was delayed from its original September 25, 2020 release.)
Marry Me	Released in theaters and on Peacock on February 11, 2022. (Note: This film was delayed twice from its original February 12, 2021 release.)
Matilda the Musical	Released in select theaters on December 9, 2022, and on Netflix on December 25.
The Matrix Resurrections	Released in theaters and on HBO Max on December 22, 2021. (Note: This film was pushed forward from its original May 21, 2021 release before its subsequent delay.)
Meg 2: The Trench	Released in theaters on August 4, 2023, and VOD on August 25.
Migration	Released in theaters on December 22, 2023, and VOD on January 23, 2024.
The Mitchells vs. the Machines	Released in limited American theaters on April 23, 2021 and on Netflix on April 30. (Note: This film was delayed three times from its original January 10, 2020 release date until the planned September 18, 2020 release.)
Mortal Kombat	Released in theaters and on HBO Max on April 23, 2021. (Note: This film was delayed from its original March 5, 2021 release, before being pushed forward to planned January 15, 2021 release, and then pushed by one week from a scheduled April 16, 2021 release.)
Music	Released in Australian theaters on January 14, 2021, and in the United States on February 10, with IMAX for one night. It was released on VOD on February 12. (Note: This film was delayed three times from its original October 2019 release, then moved to September 2020 release, until the planned February 10, 2021 release date.)
My Spy	Released in Australian and British theaters respectively on January 9, and March 13, 2020, and in theaters in Canada and on Amazon Prime Video in the United States on June 26. (Note: This film was delayed four times from an original August 23, 2019 release to a planned April 17, 2020 release.) (Note: Released in the Philippines via SM Cinemas Movies at Sundown Drive-In Cinema in SM City Pampanga Amphitheater on August 1 and in cinemas in selected areas on October 14.)
News of the World	Released in American theaters and on DirecTV on December 25, 2020, and on Netflix in international territories on February 10, 2021.
No One Will Save You	Released in theaters on September 19, 2023, and on Hulu on September 22.
No Time to Die	Released in theaters worldwide and the United States on October 8, 2021. It was released digitally on November 9.
Nomadland	Released in select IMAX theaters on January 29, 2021. Followed by a simultaneous release in select theaters, drive-in venues and on Hulu on February 19.
The Nun II	Released in theaters on September 8, 2023, and VOD on October 3.
Onward	Released in North America as planned on March 6, 2020. However, it was released digitally earlier than usual on March 20 and on Disney+ on April 3, due to theater closures. (Note: Released in Australia and New Zealand on April 24, 2020 in both theaters and on Disney+.)
Orphan: First Kill	Released in select theaters, VOD and Paramount+ on August 19, 2022.
Our Friend	Released in select theaters and VOD on January 22, 2021.
The Outpost	Released in select theaters and VOD on July 3, 2020.
Paw Patrol: The Mighty Movie	Released in theaters on September 29, 2023, and VOD on October 31.
Paw Patrol: The Movie	Released in theaters and on Paramount+ on August 20, 2021.
Pinocchio	Released in select theaters beginning November 9, 2022 and Netflix on December 9.
The Prom	Released in American theaters on December 4, 2020, and Netflix on December 11.
Puss in Boots: The Last Wish	Released in theaters on December 21, 2022, and VOD on January 6, 2023.
A Quiet Place Part II	Released in theaters on May 28, 2021, and on Paramount+ 45 days later. (Note: This film was pushed forward from its original May 15, 2020 release to a planned March 20, 2020 date, then delayed to September 4, 2020, delayed further to April 23, 2021, and then delayed once more to September 17, 2021.)
Raya and the Last Dragon	Released in theaters and on Disney+ with Premier Access on March 5, 2021. (Note: This film was delayed from its original November 25, 2020 release.)
Rebel Moon – Part One: A Child of Fire	Released in limited theaters on December 15, 2023, and Netflix on December 22.
Red Notice	Released in limited theaters on November 5, 2021, and Netflix on November 12.
Reminiscence	Released in theaters and on HBO Max on August 20, 2021. (Note: This film was delayed from its original April 16, 2021 release, and then moved up from its September 3, 2021 release.)
Resident Evil: Welcome to Raccoon City	Released in theaters on November 24, 2021, and VOD on December 21. (Note: This film was delayed from its original September 3, 2021 release and then moved a week to September 9, before its subsequent delay to November 24, 2021.)
Respect	Released in theaters on August 13, 2021, and VOD on August 27.
The Retaliators	Released in theaters on September 14, 2022, and VOD on October 21.
The Road to Galena	Released in select theaters and VOD on July 8, 2022.
Rogue	Released in limited American theaters and VOD simultaneously on August 28, 2020.
Ruby Gillman, Teenage Kraken	Released in theaters on June 30, 2023, and VOD on July 18.
Saw X	Released in theaters on September 29, 2023, and VOD on October 20.
Scoob!	Released on VOD in North America on May 15, 2020 (Note: This film was originally scheduled for a September 21, 2018 release until the planned May 15, 2020 release, but this change of date occurred before the pandemic and the American theatrical release was then canceled during the height of the pandemic.) and in theaters in select countries with relaxed COVID-19 restrictions beginning July 8. Later reissued in North American theaters on May 21, 2021.
Scrooge: A Christmas Carol	Released in select theaters on November 18, 2022, and Netflix on December 2.
The Sea Beast	Released in limited theaters on June 24, 2022, and Netflix on July 8.
Shazam! Fury of the Gods	Released in theaters on March 17, 2023, and VOD on April 7. Later released on Max on May 23.
Sing 2	Released in theaters on December 22, 2021, and VOD on January 7, 2022.
Skylines	Released in select theaters and on Apple TV on December 18, 2020.
Slayers	Released in select theaters and VOD on October 21, 2022.
Smile	Released in theaters on September 30, 2022, and VOD and Paramount+ on November 15.
Snake Eyes	Released in theaters on July 23, 2021, and on Paramount+ 45 days later. (Note: This film was pushed forward from its original October 23, 2020 release, then delayed to October 22, 2021.)
Sonic the Hedgehog	Released in North America as planned on February 14, 2020. Later released digitally on March 31. (Note: This film was delayed three times from its original 2018 release to a planned November 8, 2019 release, but these changes of dates occurred before the pandemic.) (Note: Released in Japan and China on June 26, 2020, and July 31, 2020, respectively.)
Sonic the Hedgehog 2	Released in theaters on April 8, 2022, and on Paramount+ on May 24.
Soul	Released on Disney+ in North America and in re-opened theaters in select countries on December 25, 2020. (Note: This film was delayed twice from its original June 19, 2020 theatrical release but was ultimately being cancelled.) Later released in North American theaters on January 12, 2024.
Space Jam: A New Legacy	Released in theaters and on HBO Max on July 16, 2021.
Spirited	Released in limited theaters on November 11, 2022, and on Apple TV+ on November 18. Later re-released in theaters on December 16.
The SpongeBob Movie: Sponge on the Run	Released in Canadian theaters on August 14, 2020, on Netflix in select countries on November 5 and on Paramount+ in the United States on March 4, 2021. (Note: This film was delayed from its original February 9, 2019 release until its planned May 22, 2020 release but the American theatrical release date was cancelled.)
Spontaneous	Released in select theaters in North America on October 2, 2020, and VOD on October 6.
The Stand In	Released in select theaters and VOD on December 11, 2020.
Strange World	Released in theaters in North America on November 23, 2022, and Disney+ on December 23.
Strays	Released in theaters on August 18, 2023, and VOD on September 5.
Street Gang: How We Got to Sesame Street	Released in select theaters on April 23, 2021, and VOD on May 7.
The Suicide Squad	Released in theaters and on HBO Max on August 5, 2021.
Tesla	Released in select theaters and VOD on August 21, 2020.
Thirteen Lives	Released in select theaters on July 29, 2022, and on Amazon Prime Video on August 5. (Note: This film was delayed from its original April 15, 2022 release until its planned November 18, 2022 release.)
This Is the Year	Released in select theaters and VOD on September 24, 2021.
Those Who Wish Me Dead	Released in theaters and on HBO Max on May 14, 2021.
Ticket to Paradise	Released in theaters worldwide and in the United States on October 21, 2022, and VOD on November 8. Later released on Peacock on December 9.
The Tiger Rising	Released in theaters on January 21, 2022, and VOD on February 8.
Till Death	Released in limited theaters and VOD on July 2, 2021.
Tom and Jerry	Released in theaters and on HBO Max on February 26, 2021. (Note: This film was delayed four times from its original April 16, 2021 release before pushed forward to the planned February 26, 2021 release.)
Transformers: Rise of the Beasts	Released in theaters on June 9, 2023, and VOD on July 11. (Note: This film was delayed from its original June 24, 2022 release.)
The Trial of the Chicago 7	Released in select theaters on September 25, 2020, and on Netflix on October 16.
Trolls Band Together	Released in theaters on November 17, 2023, and VOD on December 19.
Trolls World Tour	Released in select theaters and VOD on April 10, 2020, in the United States. (Note: Released on VOD on April 6, 2020 in most European territories.) (Note: Released in Malaysia, Russia and Singapore early in March before worldwide theater closures.)
Trust	Released in select theaters and VOD on March 12, 2021.
The Truth	Released in select theaters and VOD on July 3, 2020.
Turning Red	Released on Disney+ in North America and in re-opened theaters in select countries on March 11, 2022. (Note: The film was also simultaneously shown at the El Capitan Theatre in Hollywood, the AMC Empire 25 in New York City, and the Grand Lake Theatre in Oakland, California, for limited engagements lasting from March 11–17, 2022.) Later released in North American theaters on February 9, 2024.
Vivo	Released in limited American theaters on July 30, 2021, and on Netflix on August 6. (Note: This film was delayed from its original December 18, 2020 release date, then pushed forward to November 6, 2020 and then delayed to April 16, 2021 and again till June 4, 2021.)
The Way Back	Released in North America as planned on March 6, 2020. However, it was released digitally earlier than usual on March 24 due to theater closures.
Where the Crawdads Sing	Released in theaters on July 15, 2022, and VOD on September 6. (Note: Attributed to multiple references:) (Note: This film was delayed from its original June 24, 2022 release date and then again till to July 22, 2022.)
Who Are You People	Released in theaters and VOD on February 24, 2023. (Note: This film was delayed from its original February 17, 2023 release date.)
Willy's Wonderland	Released in limited American theaters and VOD on February 12, 2021.
The Witches	Released on HBO Max in the United States on October 22, 2020, and in Canadian theaters on December 25. (Note: Released in select international theaters beginning October 28, 2020.)
Wonderwell	Released in limited American theaters and VOD on June 23, 2023.
Wonder Woman 1984	Released in theaters and on HBO Max on December 25, 2020. (Note: This film was delayed three times from its original December 13, 2019 release date before pushed forward to November 1, 2019 until the planned June 5, 2020 release date, then delayed to August 14, 2020 and delayed further to October 2, 2020.) (Note: Released in international territories beginning December 16, 2020.)
Wonka	Released in theaters on December 15, 2023, and VOD on January 30, 2024.
The World to Come	Released in theaters on February 12, 2021, and VOD on March 2.
The Wretched	Released in select theaters, drive-in theaters and VOD on May 1, 2020.
Young Woman and the Sea	Released in limited theaters on May 31, 2024, and Disney+ on July 19.

==== International theatrical releases ====
Film	Method of release
An American Pickle	Released on HBO Max on August 6, 2020, and in British theaters the following day.
Antebellum	Released on VOD in the United States on September 18, 2020 (Note: This film was delayed twice from its original April 24, 2020 theatrical release but was ultimately cancelled on August 6, 2020.) and in theaters in select countries with relaxed COVID-19 restrictions, including Australia on October 1.
Ava	Released in North America on DirecTV Cinema on August 27, 2020, on VOD on September 25, and on Netflix on December 6, and released in Hungarian theaters on July 2.
The Craft: Legacy	Released on VOD in the United States on October 28, 2020, and in theaters in select countries, including the Netherlands on October 29.
Digimon Adventure: Last Evolution Kizuna	Released in Japan as planned on February 21, 2020, and VOD on September 29, and Philippines cinemas on October 14 in selected areas.
Dogtanian and the Three Muskehounds	In Spain, it was originally slated for an opening in theatres on January 22, 2021, but its release was postponed to August 18.
Fatherhood	Released in theaters in China and on Netflix internationally on June 18, 2021. (Note: This film's theatrical release date was delayed twice from its original April 3, 2020 date until the planned January 15, 2021 date but this change of date occurred prior to the pandemic. The American theatrical release date was then subsequently pushed forward, delayed an additional two times during the pandemic before ultimately being cancelled on March 4, 2021.)
Four Sisters Before the Wedding	Released in the Philippines on December 11, 2020, in select cinemas and streaming platforms, KTX, iWantTFC, Sky Cable PPV and Cignal PPV.
The Grandmother	The film participated in the official selection of the 69th San Sebastián International Film Festival (SSIFF), where it premiered on September 22, 2021. It was also screened at the 54th Sitges Film Festival. Its theatrical release in Spain was tentatively slated for October 22, but was delayed to January 5, 2022, and then postponed again. It was eventually released in theatres on January 28.
Greenland	Released on VOD in the United States on December 18, 2020. (Note: This film was delayed from its original June 12, 2020 theatrical release but was ultimately being cancelled.) Released in theaters in Belgium, France, Spain, Philippines and Scandinavian countries.
The King of Staten Island	Released on VOD in North America on June 12, 2020 (Note: Originally scheduled for a theatrical release on June 19, 2020 but it was cancelled.) and in theaters in select countries with relaxed COVID-19 restrictions beginning June 25.
Knights of the Zodiac	Released in Japan on April 28, 2023, and in the United States on May 12. It was released digitally on June 27.
Live is Life	It had its official premiere at the Málaga Film Festival on June 6, 2021. Although the national theatrical release in Spain was expected to be on August 13, 2021 it was later delayed to November 5 due to the schedule of the theatrical releases caused by the COVID-19 pandemic. It had to be postponed again and was finally released on June 3, 2022.
LM5: The Tour Film	Released in Australia and Denmark on November 21, 2020. The dates in other countries were postponed due to the pandemic including the UK & Ireland in December 2020 and in Europe in January 2021, respectively. In February 2021, the film was made available for purchase on iTunes.
Long Distance	Released in theaters in Vietnam on July 12, 2024, and on Hulu on July 3, 2025.
Magikland	Released in the Philippines on December 25, 2020, until January 7, 2021, via UpStream, and on February 12, in select cinemas and streaming platforms KTX and iWantTFC.
The Man from Toronto	Released in theaters in China and on Netflix internationally on June 24, 2022.
Mulan	Released on Disney+ with Premier Access in North America and in re-opened theaters in select countries on September 4, 2020. (Note: This film was delayed from its original November 2, 2018 release until the planned March 27, 2020 theatrical release but this change of date occurred prior to the pandemic. The American theatrical release date was then delayed to July 24, 2020, and delayed further to August 21, 2020, before ultimately being cancelled on August 4, 2020.) Released in Chinese theaters on September 11.
My Little Pony: A New Generation	Released in theaters in China and on Netflix internationally on September 24, 2021. (Note: This film was delayed from an original September 24, 2021 theatrical release.)
Nahuel and the Magic Book	2 years after its world premiere at the Annecy International Animation Film Festival, it was released in theaters in Chile on January 20, 2022; Eastern Europe in June 2022 on HBO Max; and on Disney+ in Latin America on September 23. (Note: TBA)
Parallel Mothers	The film had its world premiere at the 78th Venice International Film Festival on September 1, 2021. It was intended to be theatrically released in Spain on September 10, but was postponed to October 8.
Princess DayaReese	Released in the Philippines on January 1, 2021, in select cinemas and streaming platforms, KTX, iWantTFC, Sky Cable PPV and Cignal PPV.
Run	Released on Hulu in the United States, in theaters in select countries on November 20, 2020, and on Netflix in select countries on April 2, 2021. (Note: This film was delayed from its original January 24, 2020 release until the planned May 8, 2020 theatrical release prior to the pandemic, but was later pulled out of the schedule before ultimately being cancelled during the pandemic.)
The Secret: Dare to Dream	Released on VOD in North America on July 31, 2020 (Note: This film was delayed from its original April 17, 2020 theatrical release but was ultimately being cancelled.) and in theaters in select countries with relaxed COVID-19 restrictions beginning on July 24 in Iceland.
The Secret Garden	Released on VOD in North America on August 7, 2020, and in theaters and on the Sky Cinema channels in the United Kingdom on October 23.
Songbird	Released on VOD in North America and in theaters in select countries with relaxed COVID-19 restrictions beginning December 11, 2020.
Summer of 85	The film was set to premiere at the Cannes Film Festival in May 2020, prior to its cancellation due to the COVID-19 pandemic. It was released in France on July 14. In September 2020, Music Box Films acquired U.S. distribution rights to the film.
The Summer We Lived	Initially intended to be theatrically released in Spain on November 6, 2020 but it was postponed to December 4, 2020.
Superintelligence	Released on HBO Max in North America and in theaters in select countries on November 26, 2020.
The Tomorrow War	Released on Prime Video in various countries on July 2, 2021, and in theaters in China on September 3. (Note: This film was moved up from its original December 25, 2020 theatrical release before its subsequent delay. But the American theatrical release was ultimately cancelled on April 7, 2021.)
Undercover Wedding Crashers	Initially intended to be theatrically released on March 13, 2020, the release was at first postponed to September 11. It was postponed again and screened at the Málaga Spanish Film Festival on June 4, 2021. The film was finally released in Spain on June 24.
The United States vs. Billie Holiday	Released on Hulu in North America on February 26, 2021, and in theaters in select countries beginning March 18. (Note: This film was delayed from an original February 12, 2021 theatrical release. But the American theatrical release was ultimately cancelled on December 24, 2020.)
Valley of the Dead	The film premiered on October 8, 2020, at the Sitges Film Festival. Initially intended to be theatrically released in Spain on January 22, 2021, the release was postponed to September 24. Postponed again, it was eventually released on March 11, 2022.
The Vault	In Spain, the film was initially intended to be theatrically released in autumn 2020 but the release was postponed to November 12, 2021.
Venicephrenia	The film made its world premiere at the Sitges Film Festival on October 9, 2021. Tentatively slated for a wide theatrical release on November 26 in Spain, the domestic release date was finally rescheduled to April 22, 2022.
Wish Dragon	Released in theaters in China on January 15, 2021, and on Netflix in international territories on June 11. (Note: This film was delayed from its original July 26, 2019 release date until the planned 2020 release.)
You Keep the Kids!	In Spain, the film was initially intended to be theatrically released on December 4, 2020. Its release date was postponed several times and eventually released on December 17, 2021.

=== Brought forward ===
Film	Original release date (Note: Calendar as of March 12, 2020)	New release date or action taken
65	April 14, 2023	Brought forward to March 10, 2023.
Amsterdam	November 4, 2022	Brought forward to October 7, 2022.
Babylon	January 6, 2023	Brought forward to December 23, 2022.
Civil War	April 26, 2024	Brought forward to April 12, 2024.
The Creator	October 6, 2023	Brought forward to September 29, 2023.
The Croods: A New Age	December 23, 2020 (Note: This film was delayed three times from its original November 3, 2017 release date until the planned December 23, 2020 date.)	Brought forward to November 25, 2020.
Cry Macho	October 22, 2021	Brought forward to September 17, 2021 and released in theaters and on HBO Max.
Disenchanted	November 24, 2022	Brought forward to November 18, 2022 and released on Disney+.
Dumb Money	October 20, 2023	Brought forward to September 15, 2023.
The Exorcist: Believer	October 13, 2023	Brought forward to October 6, 2023.
The Eyes of Tammy Faye	September 24, 2021	Brought forward to September 17, 2021.
Father Stu	April 15, 2022	Brought forward to April 13, 2022.
Ghostbusters: Frozen Empire	March 29, 2024	Brought forward to March 22, 2024.
The Holdovers	November 10, 2023	Brought forward to October 27, 2023.
Kingdom of the Planet of the Apes	May 24, 2024	Brought forward to May 10, 2024.
Knock at the Cabin	February 17, 2023	Brought forward to February 3, 2023.
The Lost City	April 15, 2022	Brought forward to March 25, 2022.
M3GAN	January 13, 2023	Brought forward to January 6, 2023.
The Marksman	January 22, 2021	Brought forward to January 15, 2021.
Missing	February 24, 2023	Brought forward to January 20, 2023.
Night Swim	January 19, 2024	Brought forward to January 5, 2024.
Not Okay	August 5, 2022	Brought forward to July 29, 2022.
Paint	April 28, 2023	Brought forward to April 7, 2023.
Paw Patrol: The Mighty Movie	October 13, 2023	Brought forward to September 29, 2023.
Saltburn	November 24, 2023	Brought forward to November 17, 2023.
Saw X	October 27, 2023	Brought forward to September 29, 2023.
Scream VI	March 31, 2023	Brought forward to March 10, 2023.
The Suicide Squad	August 6, 2021	Brought forward to August 5, 2021 and released in theaters and on HBO Max.
Teenage Mutant Ninja Turtles: Mutant Mayhem	August 4, 2023	Brought forward to August 2, 2023.
Three Thousand Years of Longing	August 31, 2022	Brought forward to August 26, 2022.
We Can Be Heroes	January 1, 2021	Brought forward to December 25, 2020.

=== Delayed ===
Film	Original release date	New release date or action taken
100 Nichikan Ikita Wani	May 28, 2021	July 9, 2021
2 Hearts	September 11, 2020	October 16, 2020
13 Fanboy	2020	October 22, 2021
The 355	January 15, 2021	January 7, 2022
83	April 10, 2020	December 24, 2021
American Underdog	December 18, 2020 (Note: This film was delayed twice from its original December 18, 2020 release.)	December 25, 2021
Antlers	April 17, 2020	October 29, 2021
Aquaman and the Lost Kingdom	December 16, 2022	December 22, 2023
Arracht	April 3, 2020	November 6, 2020
The Artist's Wife	April 3, 2020	September 25, 2020
Avatar: Fire and Ash	December 22, 2023 (Note: This film was delayed several times from its original December 18, 2015 release date until the planned December 19, 2025 date.)	December 19, 2025 (replacing Avatar 4, scheduled for release on December 21, 2029)
Avatar: The Way of Water	December 17, 2021	December 16, 2022 (Note: This film was delayed numerous times from its original December 19, 2014 release date until the planned December 16, 2022 date.)
Avatar 4	December 19, 2025 (Note: This film was delayed several times from its original December 2022 release date until the planned December 21, 2029 date.)	December 21, 2029
Avatar 5	December 17, 2027 (Note: This film was delayed several times from its original December 2023 release date until the planned December 19, 2031 date.)	December 19, 2031
Babylon	December 25, 2021	December 23, 2022
Bad Boys: Ride or Die	July 3, 2019 (Note: This film was delayed twice from its original July 3, 2019 release, then to May 24, 2019 until the planned June 7, 2024 date.)	June 7, 2024
The Bad Guys	September 17, 2021	April 22, 2022
Barbie	May 8, 2020 (Note: This film was delayed numerous times from its original June 2, 2017 release until the planned July 21, 2023 date.)	July 21, 2023 (replacing Coyote vs. Acme, released on August 28, 2026)
The Batman	June 25, 2021	March 4, 2022 (replacing A Minecraft Movie, released on April 4, 2025)
A Beautiful Day in the Neighborhood	November 22, 2019	Released in North America as planned. Delayed in China until September 18, 2020.
Black Adam	December 22, 2021	October 21, 2022
Black Panther: Wakanda Forever	May 6, 2022	November 11, 2022 (Note: As part of the future Marvel Cinematic Universe, the initial delay of Black Widow forced the rest of Phase Four films to be pushed back, too.)
The Bob's Burgers Movie	July 17, 2020	May 27, 2022
Boonie Bears: The Wild Life	January 25, 2020	February 12, 2021
Brahmāstra Part One: Shiva	December 4, 2020	September 9, 2022
Break	April 2020	July 22, 2020
The Broken Hearts Gallery	July 17, 2020	September 11, 2020
Bullet Train	April 8, 2022 (Note: This film was delayed three times from its original April 8, 2022 release date until the planned August 5, 2022 date.)	August 5, 2022
Candyman	June 12, 2020	August 27, 2021
Chaos Walking	January 22, 2021 (Note: This film was delayed twice from its original March 1, 2019 release date until the planned January 22, 2021 date.)	March 5, 2021
The Climb	March 20, 2020	November 13, 2020
Cobra	April 2020	August 11, 2022
Come Play	July 24, 2020	October 30, 2020
The Comeback Trail	November 13, 2020	February 25, 2025
The Cornered Mouse Dreams of Cheese	June 5, 2020	September 11, 2020
Coyote vs. Acme	July 21, 2023	August 28, 2026
Crayon Shin-chan: Crash! Rakuga Kingdom and Almost Four Heroes	April 24, 2020	September 11, 2020
Creators: The Past	March 19, 2020	October 8, 2020
Cut Throat City	April 10, 2020	August 21, 2020
Dark Harvest	September 24, 2021	October 11, 2023
DC League of Super-Pets	May 20, 2022	July 29, 2022 (replacing Black Adam, released on October 21, 2022)
Death on the Nile	October 9, 2020 (Note: This film was delayed five times from its original December 20, 2019 date until the planned February 11, 2022 date.)	February 11, 2022
Delete History	April 22, 2020	August 26, 2020
Detective Chinatown 3	January 24, 2020	February 12, 2021
Detective Conan: The Scarlet Bullet	April 17, 2020	April 16, 2021
Doctor Strange in the Multiverse of Madness	May 7, 2021	May 6, 2022 (replacing Black Panther: Wakanda Forever, released on November 11, 2022)
Dog	February 12, 2021	February 18, 2022
Doraemon: Nobita's Little Star Wars 2021	March 5, 2021	March 4, 2022
Doraemon: Nobita's New Dinosaur	March 6, 2020	August 7, 2020 (replacing Stand by Me Doraemon 2, released on November 20, 2020)
Downton Abbey: A New Era	December 22, 2021 (Note: This film was delayed twice from its original December 22, 2021 release date until the planned April and May 2022 release dates.)	April 29, 2022 (U.K.), May 20, 2022 (U.S.)
Dragon Rider	August 6, 2020	October 1, 2020
Dream Horse	April 17, 2020 (U.K.), May 1, 2020 (U.S.)	May 21, 2021 (U.S.), June 4, 2021 (U.K.)
Dungeons & Dragons: Honor Among Thieves	November 19, 2021	March 31, 2023
Easter Sunday	April 1, 2022	August 5, 2022
Elvis	October 1, 2021	June 24, 2022
The Empty Man	August 7, 2020	October 23, 2020 (replacing Everybody's Talking About Jamie, released on September 17, 2021)
Escape Room: Tournament of Champions	August 14, 2020	July 16, 2021 (replacing Spider-Man: No Way Home, released on December 17, 2021)
Eternals	November 6, 2020	November 5, 2021 (replacing Thor: Love and Thunder, released on July 8, 2022)
Evangelion: 3.0+1.0 Thrice Upon a Time	June 27, 2020	March 8, 2021
F9	May 22, 2020 (Note: This film was delayed five times from its original April 19, 2019 release date until the planned June 25, 2021 date.)	June 25, 2021
Fantastic Beasts: The Secrets of Dumbledore	November 12, 2021	April 15, 2022
Fast Forever	February 2024	March 17, 2028
Fast X	April 2, 2021	May 19, 2023
Fatale	June 19, 2020	December 18, 2020
Fate/Grand Order - Divine Realm of the Round Table: Camelot	August 15, 2020	December 5, 2020
Fate/stay night: Heaven's Feel III. spring song	April 25, 2020	August 15, 2020
The Father	December 18, 2020	February 26, 2021
The Flash	July 1, 2022 (Note: This film was delayed numerous times from its original March 9, 2018 release until the planned June 16, 2023 date.)	June 16, 2023
The Forever Purge	July 10, 2020	July 2, 2021 (replacing Sing 2, released on December 22, 2021)
Free Guy	July 3, 2020	August 13, 2021
The French Dispatch	July 24, 2020	October 22, 2021
Ghostbusters: Afterlife	July 10, 2020	November 19, 2021
Given	May 16, 2020	August 22, 2020
Go! Anpanman: Fluffy Fuwari and the Cloud Country	June 26, 2020	June 25, 2021
Grand Blue	May 29, 2020	August 7, 2020
The Green Knight	May 29, 2020	July 30, 2021
Happily	April 18, 2020	March 19, 2021
Happy-Go-Lucky Days	May 6, 2020	December 17, 2022
Happy Times	April 18, 2020	March 19, 2021
Hello, Tyranno	June 2020	December 10, 2021
Hitman's Wife's Bodyguard	August 28, 2020	June 16, 2021
Honest Thief	September 4, 2020	October 16, 2020
I Carry You with Me	January 8, 2021	June 25, 2021
Inception (10th anniversary)	July 17, 2020	August 21, 2020
Indiana Jones and the Dial of Destiny	July 9, 2021 (Note: This film was delayed numerous times from its original July 19, 2019 release until the planned June 30, 2023 date.)	June 30, 2023
Jersey	December 31, 2021	April 22, 2022
JeruZalem 2	2020	January 1, 2023
Jiang Ziya	January 25, 2020	October 1, 2020
John Wick: Chapter 4	May 21, 2021	March 24, 2023
Josee, the Tiger and the Fish	mid-2020	December 25, 2020
Jurassic World Dominion	June 11, 2021	June 10, 2022
Kaamelott: The First Chapter	July 29, 2020	July 21, 2021
Kajillionaire	June 19, 2020	September 25, 2020
Keep Your Hands Off Eizouken!	May 15, 2020	September 25, 2020
The King's Man	September 18, 2020 (Note: This film was delayed twice from its original November 15, 2019 release date until the planned September 18, 2020 date.)	December 22, 2021
Knights of Sidonia: Ai Tsumugu Hoshi	May 14, 2021	June 4, 2021
Koko-di Koko-da	March 27, 2020	November 6, 2020
The Last Duel	December 25, 2020	October 15, 2021 (replaced Hamilton, released on July 3, 2020, on Disney+, and in theaters on September 5, 2025)
Last Night in Soho	September 25, 2020	October 29, 2021
The Last Train to New York	April 21, 2023	TBA
The Last Vermeer	May 22, 2020	November 20, 2020
Leap	January 25, 2020	September 25, 2020
Legend of the White Dragon	2020	August 28, 2026
Let Him Go	August 21, 2020	November 6, 2020
Little Women	December 25, 2019	Released in North America as planned. Delayed in Denmark and Japan until June 6 & 13, 2020, respectively, and in China until August 25.
Looking for Magical Doremi	May 15, 2020	November 13, 2020
Lost Girls & Love Hotels	September 4, 2020	September 18, 2020
Love Me, Love Me Not	May 29, 2020	September 18, 2020
Lyle, Lyle, Crocodile	July 22, 2022	October 7, 2022 (replacing Spider-Man: Across the Spider-Verse, released on June 2, 2023)
Made in Abyss: Dawn of the Deep Soul	April 13, 2020	September 11, 2020
Marry Me	February 12, 2021	February 11, 2022
Masters of the Universe	March 5, 2021	June 5, 2026
Micronauts	June 4, 2021	TBA
A Minecraft Movie	March 4, 2022	April 4, 2025
Minions: The Rise of Gru	July 3, 2020	July 1, 2022 (replacing Untitled Illumination film)
Mission: Impossible – Dead Reckoning Part One	July 23, 2021	July 12, 2023 (Note: This film was delayed from its original July 23, 2021, then to a November 19, 2021 release, then May 27, 2022 and then September 30, 2022 and then July 14, 2023 release, later July 12, 2023 release.)
Mission: Impossible – The Final Reckoning	August 5, 2022	May 23, 2025
Monster Hunter	September 4, 2020	December 18, 2020
Moonfall	October 22, 2021	February 4, 2022
Morbius	July 31, 2020	April 1, 2022
The New Mutants	April 3, 2020 (Note: This film was delayed four times from its original April 13, 2018 release date until the planned August 28, 2020 date.)	August 28, 2020
The Night House	July 16, 2021	August 20, 2021
The Nightingale	December 25, 2020	March 19, 2027
Nine Days	January 22, 2021	July 30, 2021
Nobody	August 14, 2020	March 26, 2021 (replacing The Boss Baby: Family Business, released on July 2, 2021)
No Time to Die	April 10, 2020 (Note: This film was delayed twice from its original November 8, 2019 release date until the planned October 8, 2021 date.)	September 30, 2021 (U.K.), October 8, 2021 (U.S.) (Note: Universal Pictures holds the international rights to the film.)
Old	February 26, 2021	July 23, 2021
Our Ladies	April 24, 2020	June 18, 2021 (U.S.), August 27, 2021 (U.K.)
The Personal History of David Copperfield	May 8, 2020	August 28, 2020
Peter Rabbit 2: The Runaway	April 3, 2020 (Note: This film was delayed nine times from its original February 7, 2020 release date until the planned June 11, 2021 date.)	June 11, 2021
Pokémon the Movie: Secrets of the Jungle	July 10, 2020	December 25, 2020
Pretty Cure Miracle Leap: A Strange Day with Everyone	March 20, 2020	October 31, 2020
Prey for the Devil	January 8, 2021	October 28, 2022
Princess Principal: Crown Handler	April 10, 2020	February 11, 2021
Promising Young Woman	April 17, 2020	December 25, 2020
Puss in Boots: The Last Wish	September 23, 2022	December 21, 2022 (replacing The Super Mario Bros. Movie, released on April 5, 2023)
Recorder: The Marion Stokes Project	April 17, 2020	September 17, 2020 (U.K.)
Redeeming Love	2021	January 21, 2022
The Rescue	January 25, 2020	December 18, 2020
Respect	December 25, 2020 (Note: This film was delayed four times from its original August 14, 2020 release date until the planned August 13, 2021 date.)	August 13, 2021
Revue Starlight Rondo Rondo Rondo	May 29, 2020	August 7, 2020
Ron's Gone Wrong	February 26, 2021 (Note: This film was delayed twice from its original November 6, 2020 release date until the planned October 22, 2021 date.)	October 22, 2021
Rurouni Kenshin: The Beginning	August 7, 2020	June 4, 2021
Rurouni Kenshin: The Final	July 3, 2020	April 23, 2021
Sailor Moon Eternal – Part 1	September 11, 2020	January 8, 2021
Saint Maud	April 10, 2020 (U.K.), May 1, 2020 (U.S.)	October 9, 2020 (U.K.), January 29, 2021 (U.S.)
The Salt of Tears	April 8, 2020	January 8, 2021
Scott Pilgrim vs. the World (10th anniversary)	August 2020	August 21, 2020 (U.K.), April 30, 2021 (U.S.)
Shang-Chi and the Legend of the Ten Rings	February 12, 2021	September 3, 2021
Shazam! Fury of the Gods	April 1, 2022	March 17, 2023 (replacing Wonka, released on December 15, 2023)
Shimajirō & the Sky Flying Ship	February 28, 2020	March 12, 2021
Sing 2	July 2, 2021	December 22, 2021 (replacing Wicked, released in 2024 and 2025)
Six Minutes to Midnight	May 29, 2020	March 26, 2021
Slay the Dragon	March 13, 2020	April 3, 2020
Sooryavanshi	March 24, 2020	November 5, 2021
Spider-Man: Across the Spider-Verse	April 8, 2022	June 2, 2023
Spider-Man: Beyond the Spider-Verse	March 29, 2024	June 18, 2027
Spider-Man: No Way Home	July 16, 2021	December 17, 2021 (replacing Avatar: The Way of Water, released on December 16, 2022)
Spiral: From the Book of Saw	May 15, 2020 (Note: This film was scheduled for its original October 23, 2020 release date until it was pushed forward to the planned May 15, 2020 date.)	May 14, 2021
Spirit Untamed	May 14, 2021	June 4, 2021
Stand by Me Doraemon 2	August 7, 2020	November 20, 2020
Stillwater	November 6, 2020	July 30, 2021
The Super Mario Bros. Movie	December 21, 2022	April 5, 2023
Tenet	July 17, 2020	August 26, 2020 in 70 countries and September 3, 2020 in the United States. (Note: Excluding the major American markets of Los Angeles and New York, in which theaters were still closed.)
Thor: Love and Thunder	November 5, 2021	July 8, 2022 (replacing The Marvels, released on November 10, 2023)
Tokyo Revengers	October 9, 2020	July 9, 2021
Top Gun: Maverick	July 12, 2019 (Note: This film was delayed six times from its original July 12, 2019 release date, then delayed to June 26, 2020 and pushed forward to the planned June 24, 2020 date, then to December 23, 2020, and then further delayed to July 2, 2021, and again to November 19, 2021, and again to May 27, 2022.)	May 27, 2022 (Note: Attributed to multiple references:)
The Truffle Hunters	December 25, 2020	March 5, 2021
Twist	2020	January 29, 2021 (U.K.)
Ultraman Taiga The Movie: New Generation Climax	March 6, 2020	August 7, 2020
The Unbearable Weight of Massive Talent	March 19, 2021	April 22, 2022
Uncharted	March 5, 2021 (Note: This film was delayed numerous times from its original June 10, 2016 release date until the planned March 5, 2021 date.)	February 18, 2022
Under the Boardwalk	July 22, 2022	October 27, 2023
Unhinged	July 10, 2020	August 21, 2020 (Note: This film was first released in Germany on July 16, 2020.)
Untitled Sesame Street film	January 15, 2021	TBA
Untitled second Star Wars film	December 20, 2024	TBA
Untitled third Star Wars film	December 18, 2026	TBA
Vanguard	January 25, 2020	November 20, 2020
Venom: Let There Be Carnage	October 2, 2020	October 1, 2021 (replacing theatrical release of Hotel Transylvania: Transformania, released on Amazon Prime Video on January 14, 2022)
Violet Evergarden: The Movie	April 24, 2020	September 18, 2020
Voyagers	November 25, 2020	April 9, 2021
The War with Grandpa	September 18, 2020 (Note: This film was delayed numerous times from its original April 21, 2017 release until the planned October 9, 2020 date.)	October 9, 2020
West Side Story	December 18, 2020	December 10, 2021
Wicked	December 22, 2021	November 22, 2024 (Wicked: Part I), November 21, 2025 (Wicked: For Good)
Words Bubble Up Like Soda Pop	May 15, 2020	July 22, 2021
Wrath of Man	January 15, 2021	May 7, 2021
Wrong Turn	2020	January 26, 2021
Zola	2020	June 30, 2021

=== Cancelled ===
Film	Alternative method of release
Arkansas	Released on VOD on May 5, 2020.
Artemis Fowl	Released on Disney+ on June 12, 2020. (Note: This film was delayed from an original August 9, 2019 release to the planned May 29, 2020 theatrical release.)
Bad Trip	Accidentally released on Amazon Prime Video on April 17, 2020. Released on Netflix on March 26, 2021. (Note: This film was delayed twice from an original October 2019 release to a planned April 24, 2020 theatrical release.)
Beastie Boys Story	Released on Apple TV+ on April 24, 2020.
Bed Rest	Released on Tubi on December 7, 2022.
Blue Story	Released on VOD on May 5, 2020.
Body Cam	Released on VOD on May 19, 2020.
Bull	Released on VOD on May 1, 2020.
Capone	Released on VOD on May 12, 2020.
Charm City Kings	Released on HBO Max on October 8, 2020.
Chemical Hearts	Released on Prime Video on August 21, 2020.
Clouds	Released on Disney+ on October 16, 2020.
Coming 2 America	Released on Prime Video on March 4, 2021. (Note: This film was delayed from its original August 7, 2020 theatrical release to the planned December 18, 2020 date.)
Deep Water	Released on Hulu in the United States and Amazon Prime Video internationally on March 18, 2022. (Note: This film was delayed three times from its original November 13, 2020 release date to January 14, 2022 until it was ultimately cancelled.)
Deerskin	Released on VOD on May 1, 2020.
Emperor	Released on VOD on August 18, 2020.
Endings, Beginnings	Released on VOD on April 17, 2020.
Enola Holmes	Released on Netflix on September 23, 2020.
Enter the Fat Dragon	Premiered online. (Note: Except in Hong Kong, Taiwan, and the Philippines, where the film had already gone to theaters on January 29, 2020.)
Fear Street Part One: 1994	Released on Netflix on July 2, 2021.
Fear Street Part Two: 1978	Released on Netflix on July 9, 2021.
Fear Street Part Three: 1666	Released on Netflix on July 16, 2021.
Finch	Released on Apple TV+ on November 5, 2021. (Note: This film was delayed three times from an original October 2, 2020 theatrical release.)
Fire Island	Released on Hulu in the United States and internationally on Disney+ on June 3, 2022.
Forte	Released on Prime Video on April 15, 2020.
Friend of the World	Released on VOD on November 22, 2021.
Good Luck to You, Leo Grande	Released on Hulu on June 17, 2022.
Greyhound	Released on Apple TV+ on July 10, 2020. (Note: This film was delayed twice from an original March 22, 2019 release until the planned June 12, 2020 theatrical release.)
Gunjan Saxena: The Kargil Girl	Released on Netflix on August 12, 2020.
Hearts and Bones	Released on VOD on May 6, 2020.
Infinite	Released on Paramount+ on June 10, 2021. (Note: This film was delayed twice from its original August 7, 2020 release before ultimately having its theatrical release cancelled.)
Lost in Russia	Released for free on TikTok and Xigua Video on January 25, 2020.
Love the Way U Lie	Planned as an entry of the cancelled 2020 Metro Manila Summer Film Festival on April 11, 2020. Released on Netflix on August 20.
The Lovebirds	Released on Netflix on May 22, 2020. (Note: This film was delayed from an original April 3, 2020 theatrical release.)
Not Okay	Released on Hulu in the United States and internationally on Disney+ on July 29, 2022.
Ode to Passion	The film's premiere at the Queens World Film Festival on March 21, 2020, was canceled when all film festivals at that time were forced to go virtual. Released on Prime Video on July 10.
The One and Only Ivan	Released on Disney+ on August 21, 2020.
Paranormal Activity: Next of Kin	Released on Paramount+ on October 29, 2021. (Note: The film was delayed from an original March 19, 2021 and then moved up from a March 4, 2022 theatrical release.)
Praise This	Released on Peacock on April 7, 2023.
Prey	Released on Hulu in the United States and internationally on Disney+ on August 5, 2022.
Rumble	Released on Paramount+ on December 15, 2021. (Note: This film was delayed from its original July 31, 2020 release date to February 18, 2022 until it was ultimately cancelled.)
Run Sweetheart Run	Released on Prime Video on October 28, 2022.
Samaritan	Released on Prime Video on August 26, 2022.
Secret Headquarters	Released on Paramount+ on August 12, 2022.
Shotgun Wedding	Released on Prime Video on January 27, 2023.
Space Sweepers	Released on Netflix on February 5, 2021. Planned theatrical release in July 2020 was postponed to September 23 and eventually cancelled after a spike in COVID-19 cases in South Korea.
Spell	Released on VOD on October 30, 2020.
Spit Earth: Who Is Jordan Wolfson?	Released on VOD on May 1, 2020.
Steven Universe: The Movie	Planned for Fathom Events release on March 23, 2020, but was cancelled after theaters across the country closed as a precautionary measure. The episode of Steven Universe Future that was supposed to play after this screening, "Homeworld Bound", showed up on Cartoon Network's website the same day the event was to take place.
Tammy's Always Dying	Released on VOD on May 1, 2020.
Texas Chainsaw Massacre	Released on Netflix on February 18, 2022.
Think Like a Dog	Released on VOD on June 9, 2020.
The Tiger's Apprentice	Released on Paramount+ on February 2, 2024.
Time to Hunt	Originally to have been released on Netflix on April 10, 2020, the streaming service's debut of the film was itself postponed two days earlier to comply with a ruling in the Seoul Central District Court regarding distribution contracts. The film was released on April 23.
Trump Card	Released on VOD on October 9, 2020.
The Underdoggs	Released on Prime Video on January 26, 2024.
Valley Girl	Released on VOD on May 8, 2020.
A Whisker Away	Released on Netflix on June 18, 2020.
Without Remorse	Released on Prime Video on April 30, 2021. (Note: This film was delayed three times from an original September 18, 2020 theatrical release.)
The Woman in the Window	Released on Netflix on May 14, 2021. (Note: This film was delayed from an original October 4, 2019 release until the planned May 15, 2020 theatrical release.)
Working Man	Released on VOD on May 5, 2020.
Yorme: The Isko Domagoso Story	Released on streaming platforms KTX, iWantTFC, Upstream, and Vivamax on January 21, 2022. (Note: This film was delayed from an original December 1, 2021 release until the planned January 26, 2022 theatrical release.)
You Should Have Left	Released on VOD on June 18, 2020.

== Productions ==
=== Suspended ===
- Abruptio
- Am I OK?
- Art of Love
- Atrangi Re
- Avatar: Fire and Ash
- Avatar: The Way of Water
- The Batman
- The Card Counter
- Cinderella
- Clickbait
- The Collected
- Copshop
- Coyote vs. Acme (initially cancelled, then revived)
- Don't Worry Darling
- Elvis
- Emancipation
- The Expendabelles (initially cancelled, then revived)
- The Fire Inside
- The Forgiven
- Four's a Crowd
- Furiosa: A Mad Max Saga
- Godmothered
- Good Girl Jane
- Habit
- The Harder They Fall
- He's All That
- Home Sweet Home Alone
- Jane
- Jurassic World Dominion
- King Richard
- The Last Duel
- Lou
- Master
- The Matrix Resurrections
- Midnight in the Switchgrass
- Mission: Impossible – Dead Reckoning Part One
- Mission: Impossible – The Final Reckoning
- The Mother
- Night Teeth
- Nightmare Alley
- Nimona (initially cancelled, then revived)
- The Noel Diary
- Official Competition
- The Power of the Dog
- Prey
- The Prom
- Rebel Ridge
- Red Notice
- Robot Dreams
- Samaritan
- Shang-Chi and the Legend of the Ten Rings
- Studio 666
- Sublime
- Terrifier 2
- Tick, Tick... Boom!
- Tokyo Revengers
- The Tragedy of Macbeth
- Triangle of Sadness
- Trigger Point
- True Things
- Uncharted
- The Unforgivable
- The Unholy
- Untitled Urban Legend reboot (initially cancelled, then revived)
- Vacation Friends
- Vengeance
- White Paradise
- The Woman King
- Young. Wild. Free.

=== Delayed ===
- 365 Days: This Day
- Amsterdam
- Ant-Man and the Wasp: Quantumania
- Asterix & Obelix: The Middle Kingdom
- As They Made Us
- Avatar 4
- Avatar 5
- Babylon
- The Beast
- Beverly Hills Cop: Axel F
- Birdemic 3: Sea Eagle
- Black Adam
- Black Panther: Wakanda Forever
- Blonde
- Borderlands
- Borrego
- Bros
- The Brutalist
- Cobra
- Doctor Strange in the Multiverse of Madness
- Don't Breathe 2
- Don't Look Up
- The Exorcism
- Expend4bles
- The Fallout
- Fantastic Beasts: The Secrets of Dumbledore
- Fast X
- Final Destination Bloodlines
- Godzilla Minus One
- Going Postal: The Legacy Foretold
- The Gray Man
- Hard Truths
- The Hunchback of Notre Dame
- Indian Rambo remake
- Indiana Jones and the Dial of Destiny
- John Wick: Chapter 5
- Josephine
- Jumanji: Open World
- Killers of the Flower Moon
- Legally Blonde 3
- A Little White Lie
- The Little Mermaid
- Madame Web
- The Man from Toronto
- Matilda the Musical
- Moonfall
- My Big Fat Greek Wedding 3
- The New Simpsons Movie
- The Next 365 Days
- The Nightingale
- The Northman
- No Sudden Move
- Peter Pan & Wendy
- Reagan
- Resident Evil: Welcome to Raccoon City
- The Road to Galena
- The Royal Treatment
- Scream
- Shazam! Fury of the Gods
- Sneakerella
- Snow White
- Spider-Man: No Way Home
- Spin Me Round
- Star Trek: Section 31 (originally developed as a television series, later become a film)
- Stream
- Thor: Love and Thunder
- Three Thousand Years of Longing
- Till Death
- Untitled Sesame Street film
- Wolf Creek 3

=== Cancelled ===
- Bad Moms' Moms
- Batgirl
- The Exorcist: Deceiver
- Fantastic Beasts 4
- Fantastic Beasts 5
- Geechee (first delayed, later cancelled)
- The Mothership
- Resident Evil: The Umbrella Chronicles
- Scoob! Holiday Haunt
- Shrunk
- Tomb Raider: Obsidian
- Untitled Contagion sequel
- Untitled Pirates of the Caribbean spin-off film
- Untitled Truth or Dare sequel

== See also ==
- Impact of the COVID-19 pandemic on cinema
- 2020 in film
- 2021 in film
- 2022 in film
- Impact of the COVID-19 pandemic on television
