= Suarez: The Healing Priest =

- Official release poster
- Directed by: Joven Tan
- Starring: John Arcilla
- Production company: Saranggola Media Productions
- Distributed by: Viva Films
- Release date: December 25, 2020
- Country: Philippines
- Language: Filipino

Suarez: The Healing Priest is a 2020 Philippine biographical film directed by Joven Tan. The film depicts the life of Filipino priest and faith healer Fernando Suarez. It is one of the official entries for the 2020 Metro Manila Film Festival.

== Cast ==
- John Arcilla as Fr. Fernando 'Ado' Suarez
  - Jin Macapagal as young Ado
  - Fernando Suarez as himself
- Dante Rivero as Bishop Antonio Palang
- Troy Montero as Fr. Jeff Shannon
- Marlo Mortel as Robert
- Alice Dixson as Alice Marcelino
- Rosanna Roces and Allan Paule as Noel's parents
- Jairus Aquino as Noel
- Joonee Gamboa and Noel Trinidad as Suarez's critic bishops
- Leo Martinez and Jon Achaval as Suarez's supporter bishops
- Richard Quan as Cervando Suarez
- Rita Avila as Azucena Suarez
- Jenine Desiderio as Ado's godmother
- Perla Bautista as mysterious candle vendor

Also guests are Bobby Andrews, Gina Parreño, Menggie Cobarrubias, Christian Vasquez, Marissa Sanchez, Rubi Rubi, Michelle Vito, Buboy Villar, Andrea del Rosario, Lui Manansala, Lou Veloso, Yñigo Delen, Yayo Aguila, Dexter Doria, Archi Adamos, and Glenda Garcia, among others.

== Production ==
Several directors and producers have been involved in the biographical film project about Filipino priest and faith healer Fernando Suarez. The final film entitled Suarez: The Healing Priest was directed by Joven Tan. Suarez personally requested John Arcilla to portray him in the film. Portions of film were shot at the foot of the Taal Volcano shortly prior to its eruption in January 2020.

Suarez himself was also involved in the filming, including in one scene where he led a "digital healing segment". Suarez died on February 4, 2020. By that time, the film was almost complete.

== Release ==
The film was released via online streaming platform UpStream on December 25, 2020, as one of the ten official entries of the 2020 Metro Manila Film Festival.

== Reception ==
Suarez: The Healing Priest garnered nine nominations, but only won the Gatpuno Antonio J. Villegas Cultural Award at the awards night of the 2020 Metro Manila Film Festival.

Critic's response are also indifferent. Fred Hawson gave the movie a 5/10 and noted that it was "a pleasant watch overall, but a little too earnest, too defensive, too idealistic." Oggs Cruz of Rappler called the film "awful" and criticized the director for the "haphazardly crafted" outcome, but praised Arcilla for his "sophisticated" performance. Neil Ramos, in his review in Manila Bulletin, is more sympathetic of the film, calling it "a poignant look into the man’s life."
