= Happy Times (2021 film) =

- Happy Times theatrical movie poster
- Directed by: Ice Idanan
- Written by: G3 San Diego
- Starring: Ricci Rivero; Sharlene San Pedro; Heaven Peralejo
- Production company: Reality MM Studios
- Distributed by: Upstream
- Release date: December 17, 2021
- Running time: 90 minutes
- Country: Philippines
- Languages: Filipino; English

Happy Times is a 2021 Philippine romantic comedy directed by Ice Idanan starring Ricci Rivero, Sharlene San Pedro and Heaven Peralejo. The film was produced by Reality MM Studios and it premiered in the Philippines on December 17, 2021, via the online streaming website, Upstream.

== Synopsis ==
Toni Santos (Sharlene San Pedro) is a teen high-schooler who has a secret crush on the school's varsity basketball captain Kim (Ricci Rivero). She finally gets a chance to get close to her crush when he asks for her help in winning the heart of her popular older sister, George (Heaven Peralejo).

== Cast ==
Several Filipino sportspeople made brief appearances in the film. Basketball personalities Japs Cuan, a one-time UAAP champion, and former College of St. Benilde Blazers guard MC Abolucion played the roles of Kim's head coach and a college scout, respectively. In addition, University of Santo Tomas track and field player Baileys Acot and former De La Salle University courtside reporter Aiyanna Perlas participated in the film as part of Williams International School students. The actors' fans were also invited to the set and they were requested to be part of the background actors.

The following is a list of the full cast of Happy Times film:

=== Main cast ===
- Sharlene San Pedro as Antonette 'Toni' Santos
- Ricci Rivero as Kimberly 'Kim'
- Heaven Peralejo as Georgina 'George' Santos
- Kimpoy Feliciano as Mig

=== Supporting cast ===
- Luis Padilla as Jai
- Kimson Tan as Chok
- Migs Villasis as Robert
- Teetin Villanueva as Kris
- Aiyana Perlas as Pia
- Jovit Moya as Ricky
- Precious Lara Quigaman as Tina
- Marco Alcaraz as Mike
- Jana Victoria as Jessica
- Alfred Valbuena as Christian
- Baileys Acot as Paolo
- James Andrew Razon as Luke
- Anjo Pertierra as an opponent
- Japs Cuan as a coach

== Production ==
=== Pre-production ===
Reality Entertainment, an independent Filipino production company that was established in late 2005, began producing Happy Times in 2018. The project was headed by its executive producer Dondon Monteverde, who had produced several critically acclaimed films including On the Job in 2013 and BuyBust in 2018.

In the movie, it tackles courtship in the social media generation: the message of the movie is that it's important that you have a social media presence... but at a time of social media relevance, even the things that are supposed to be in private are shown in public... It's very important for me that there is an underlying message at the end of the movie: that love can be something that you're proud of or love is something that you keep for yourself. — G3 San Diego

Happy Times was first developed in 2018: G3 San Diego and Dondon Monteverde discussed their plans for Rivero's solo project. This marked Rivero's first starring movie.

According to G3, it was a special request from Dondon Monteverde to create a story specifically for Rivero. Monteverde told G3 to make a film for Ricci Rivero and the song would be "How Can I". G3, then, met with Idanan at a story conference in 2019 to further talk about their plans.

G3 San Diego has been a writer for 21 years; both G3 and San Pedro's first teleserye was Krystala. G3 describes Happy Times as a "first-love coming-of-age kind of movie". When asked about her inspiration to write the film, G3 answered: "I think as a writer, everything that you write comes from a certain experience... When I was crafting it, I was very cognizant of the fact that I wanted to create a perfect boyfriend... and I just looked for his intersection with Ricci. From then, I was able to come up with three concepts."

Multi-awarded filmmaker Ice Idanan just recently branched out from indie films to mainstream filmmaking. She marked her first mainstream movie in Regal Entertainment's 2019 film titled Stranded. Happy Times was her first mainstream movie under Reality Entertainment.

=== Casting and development ===
Ricci Rivero has always been wanting to pursue his acting career aside from being a well-known varsity player in the Philippines. He stated: "Ever since, I always wanted something new to do. I always get attracted to [and] enjoy watching Tagalog films." He had his first acting project in the 2018 Metro Manila Film Festival entry OTLUM, which took place after he left the De La Salle Green Archers in April 2018. Rivero then returned to playing basketball for another year and joined the University Athletic Association of the Philippines (UAAP) Season 82 as part of the UP Fighting Maroons collegiate varsity basketball team. He had been receiving several TV and film offers after his first film, though he declined them all so he could concentrate on his basketball commitment. Days after the end of the UAAP season in 2019, however, Rivero announced that he will be back in the big screen.

On November 26, 2019, Rivero confirmed via Twitter that he will be having a new acting project with Reality Entertainment, although no other details were given about it. This would be his second project as an actor a year after his acting debut in 2018. In an interview, he mentioned that he enjoyed doing films and that he appreciated the craft more, leading him to want to further experience performing in front of the cameras. In contrast with the OTLUM's horror theme, however, he wanted to try doing action films in the future as he already has a background in taekwondo. He is also open to working with anyone who is willing to help him and wherein he can learn something from the project.

In another interview of the same year, he reiterated his upcoming movie project and that it will start rolling by January. His future leading lady, Sharlene San Pedro, was also brought up during the interview regarding their fans' support of their team-up. Rivero mentioned that they have not really met nor talked personally, though he expressed: "thank you to those who appreciated us even though we haven't had any projects together". At this time the rest of the cast was yet to be confirmed. Afterward, he appeared in iWant's digital documentary series "Dayories", which emphasizes collegiate players' real-life stories in hopes to inspire the younger generation.

On January 27, 2020, G3 announced through her Twitter account the inclusion of three other leads, namely San Pedro, Peralejo, and Feliciano. On a separate interview, the team mentioned that the cast did not go through auditions, but was specifically chosen for their roles. Idanan added that it feels like the film characters were specifically written for the cast and it suits them so well.

During the press conference in December 2021, Philippine Daily Inquirer journalist Allan Policarpio asked the cast's sentiments with their characters and how they relate to them: San Pedro said her similarities with Toni include her not being girly and people misunderstanding her sexuality; Rivero said he is family-oriented, and he is not overly confident nor proud compared to Kim; Unlike George, Peralejo is close with her real sibling and there are people handling her social media accounts.

=== Filming ===
Principal photography on the film began in early February 2020 in the Philippines, and was scheduled to be released in the summer of 2020.

In March 2020, after the Philippine film and TV industry had started halting filming production due to the COVID-19 pandemic, Reality Entertainment decided to stop most of its operations and projects as well starting on the 15th. The cast and crew, thus, had to reschedule the rest of the film shooting. According to Rivero, "there are three days left for Happy Times shooting, and the remaining shots are the major scenes".

Around the same time that the TV and film production ban was lifted and the new rules were implemented in June, Rivero confirmed that Happy Times production will resume and that he yearned for the completion of the film. In mid-October, production manager Mark Salamat announced San Pedro's request to resume the shoot in January 2021 for safety reasons. During this time, San Pedro was busy with her academics: she was finishing her school thesis while completing her on-the-job training in March 2020. However, she is still active in the entertainment and the video game industry, including signing a contract with Yellow Room Music in August to further her music career, hosting "Ambagets: Ambagan ng Bagets" alongside Miles Ocampo via the Kumu app, streaming and "amassing a respectable number of followers on [her] gaming-dedicated Facebook page", as well as collaborating with the Don't Blame the Kids (DBTK) clothing brand and Call of Duty: Mobile (CODM) mobile game for their streetwear collection.

While the film was put on hold and the UAAP Season 83 was canceled, Rivero went on doing other television projects such as a regular hosting gig for a time and miniseries via TV5's Sunday Noontime Live! and Gen Z, respectively, by the end of the year. He also appeared in Erik Matti's 2021 horror film Rabid. On the other hand, Peralejo released her debut single "Nahulog Na Puso" in 2020 under Star Pop.

Subsequently, the crew was scheduled to finish the shoot in March and May, respectively, as discussed during their pre-production meetings via Zoom; though the dates were pushed back once again Filming resumed at the end of July 2021 and was wrapped on August 1, 2021. The remaining scenes were shot by director Joel Ferrer.

Rivero noted that he enjoyed doing the film because he wanted to entertain his fans, who, he says, can relate to the characters of the movie. Idanan also guided him in making the film, which allowed him to be comfortable with the team. He said: "At first, it was really hard. Direk Ice was consistently motivating me. 'You can do it. Get some rest. Let's pray.'" Working with the cast, particularly San Pedro and Peralejo, was also fun, according to him. Rivero stated: "It feels like we are just playing in the set". He further explained how his two leading ladies were very professional at work. Since San Pedro and Peralejo are both seasoned actresses, they helped him on how to act in front of the camera. In another interview, he stated, "While the director is my coach, my costars are my teammates. If I'm having a hard time, I ask them what's the best way to deliver a line, or how to react to what the other characters are doing. I had many questions and they made sure to help and guide me."

Post-production started as early as February 2020. In September 2021, Idanan confirmed that Editor's cut was finished. Happy Times was three years in the making.

=== Music ===
Gwyneth Dorado, who was part of Asia's Got Talent Season 1's grand finalists, is the singer behind the songs featured in the film. Mark Salamat asked Ice Idanan if they wanted to create a theme song for the film. He, then, recommended the then new-and-upcoming artist, Dorado. Idanan agreed and told him how she wanted the lyrics to convey the premise of the story. A day later, Dorado had completed both the lyrics and the melody of the song titled "Shooting Stars". The studio version of the song was released on December 21, 2021, via YouTube. Other songs featured in the film are "For You" and "Home", which are also produced and performed by Dorado.

== Release and Promotion ==
On November 13, Upstream PH announced that Happy Times would be streaming in December, in time with the online video streaming platform's first anniversary.

On December 3, a less than two-minute trailer was released through UpStream's social media accounts with the tag "Catch Happy Times on Upstream Ph". It features the plot of the story wherein Toni, who has a crush on Kim, was asked by him for help to get close with George. Upon its release, the trailer trended in the Philippines and worldwide via Twitter. It also gained over three million views across all social media platforms of Upstream. San Pedro noted how the trailer received many views especially since there were not a lot of promotions. Shar said: "Even though the film took a long time to be completed, the support is still there." When asked what she felt regarding the positive feedback upon its release, Idanan said: "I'm very happy because imagine, G3 wrote it in 2018, we met in 2019, we started filming in 2020, and it's finally going to be released in 2021... I'm happy that our happy set reflected on Happy Times, and I hope the viewers will be happy too once they watched the film." Advanced ticket selling was then released a week before its official release through the Upstream website.

The cast had few promotional appearances through digital media due to limited face-to-face promotions amidst the pandemic. San Pedro and Rivero appeared in interviews via Kumu. They also appeared in G3's "#LiveWithG3" to further promote their film. According to G3, the original sport of Kim in the film was water polo but due to the pandemic, it was replaced with basketball.

The film's press conference was held virtually via Facebook on December 16, 2021. Rivero said that after this film, he would bring back his focus on his basketball career especially since it would be his last season in the UAAP. He is not closing his doors on the entertainment industry, though, as he enjoyed working in the field.

Happy Times release date was scheduled on May 6, 2020. However, it was constantly delayed due to the pandemic, moving Happy Times's release date to December 17, 2022, online via Upstream PH. G3 said: "We were supposed to have a theatrical release, now it's going to be streaming so it's really a movie for this audience, for this generation." Rivero added that he did not mind the film premiering on a streaming platform. "We're just thankful", he said.

== Reception ==
On February 5, 2020, Rivero and San Pedro's edited photo became a trending topic on Twitter with over 36,900 likes and 4,700 retweets as of writing. This was before filming began. The next month, SharCci fans (derived from their names: Sharlene and Ricci) made a buzz on Twitter once again to show support for the film despite its hiatus amidst the pandemic.

A month after the movie's release, SharCci fans had a promotional media at SM Megamall on January 7 and 8 of 2022. The next month on February 14, they celebrated Valentine's Day with a LED display of the film's snippets, as seen at a large steel-framed globe in SM Mall of Asia (MOA Globe).

When asked about how their team-up first started, San Pedro said their fans wrote stories about them via Twitter-serye (trans: "Twitter series") posted on Twitter. She added: "It's delightful to know that it started there. The power of social media is amazing because if you make a buzz and you manage to build a fan base, there's already the possibility that you'll get your own film." Furthermore, San Pedro said she is comfortable working with Rivero. Both agreed that they would be willing to work together on future projects if given a chance.

According to JE CC of LionHearTV, Happy Times is a typical romcom that "...is perpetually vulnerable to tropes and formulas", but it did not succeed in further exploring "the dynamics of a broken family". He commented: "The script has a lot to work out to become more tangible, but for the effort alone, it's worth noting that that somewhat prevented the film from ending up being empty."

JE CC continued that Rivero's acting "...leaves an impression that's enough but can still improve a lot" and that "...it's hard to miss the potential in him". Netizens praised Rivero's acting, saying he had improved since his debut film.

On the other hand, Sharlene San Pedro and Heaven Peralejo, who were considered "...two of the most talented young actresses of their time," were not able to show their acting skills. According to JE CC, "...it's unfortunate... that Happy Times isn't something the two can flex their acting chops on".
