= Joven Tan =

- Birth name: Jovinar Tan
- Origin: Malabon, Metro Manila, Philippines
- Occupations: Songwriter, film director
- Years active: 1999–present

Jovinor "Joven" Tan is a Filipino film director and songwriter.

== Education ==
Tan, who was born in Malabon, attended the Polytechnic University of the Philippines where he earned a degree in mass communication. He was a member of the school's Bagong Himig chorale, which covered a large portion of his educational expenses.

== Career ==
=== Music ===
Tan has been creating music since 1999. He has collaborated with composers Sunny Ilacad, Eric Dela Cruz Narvaez, and Sherwin Castillo. He also wrote songs for Ogie Alcasid, Lovi Poe, the VoizBoys and Ai-Ai de las Alas.

He entered the 2013 Himig Handog songwriting competition which he won through the love song "Ano'ng Nangyari sa Ating Dalawa" fielded in the grand final. Among his other songs is the LGBT-themed "Pare, Mahal Mo Raw Ako" which was performed by Michael Pangilinan at Himig Handog P-Pop Love Songs 2014.

=== Film ===
Tan is also a film director. Among his directorial works are Paupahan, Bahay ni Lola 2, Tabi-Tabi Po and Otlum. He also did biographical films such as Suarez: The Healing Priest (2020) which depicts Fernando Suarez, Yorme: The Isko Domagoso Story (2022) which portrayed politician Isko Moreno and Kahit Maputi Na ang Buhok Ko (2023) featuring Rey Valera. He was also the line producer of the film Kung Fu Divas starring delas Alas and Marian Rivera.

== Filmography ==
=== Film ===
- Tabi-Tabi Po (2001) – "Demonyita" segment
- Eskandalosa (2002)
- Bahay ni Lola 2 (2005)
- Paupahan (2008)
- Hellphone (2009)
- Tatlong Bibe (2017)
- Wander Bra (2018)
- Otlum (2018)
- Santigwar (2019)
- Suarez: The Healing Priest (2020)
- Ayuda Babes (2021)
- Yorme: The Isko Domagoso Story (2022)
- Kahit Maputi Na Ang Buhok Ko (2023)
- Lola Barang (2024)
