= Boggy Creek =

- Theatrical release poster
- Directed by: Brian T. Jaynes
- Written by: Jennifer Minar-Jaynes
- Story by: Brian T. Jaynes
- Produced by: Brian T. Jaynes; François Frizat; Christian Remde
- Starring: Texas Battle; Stephanie Honoré; Damon Lipari; Shavon Kirksey; Melissa Carnell
- Cinematography: François Frizat
- Edited by: Brian T. Jaynes; Christian Remde
- Music by: Brandon Bentli
- Production companies: Boggy Creek LLC; Inkbug Entertainment
- Distributed by: Hannover House
- Release date: April 28, 2011 (Texas Frightmare Weekend)
- Running time: 87 minutes
- Country: United States
- Language: English

Boggy Creek (also known as Boggy Creek: The Legend Is True) is a 2011 American low-budget horror film directed by Brian T. Jaynes, written by Jennifer Minar-Jaynes, and starring Texas Battle, Stephanie Honoré, Damon Lipari, Shavon Kirksey, and Melissa Carnell as college students attacked by legendary creatures that resemble Bigfoot. Despite its name, it is unrelated to The Legend of Boggy Creek or its two sequels, although the director was inspired by it.

== Plot ==
Jennifer takes several of her friends to a remote cabin in Texas, where her father died of a supposed car accident. There, locals warn them of hostile creatures that, according to legend, murder the men and abduct the women. The creatures, which resemble the legendary Bigfoot, eventually show up and attack Jennifer and her friends.

== Cast ==
- Texas Battle as Tommy Davis
- Stephanie Honoré as Brooke Tyler
- Damon Lipari as Dave Marshall
- Shavon Kirksey as Maya Jones
- Melissa Carnell as Jennifer Dupree
- Cody Callahan as Casey Guthrie
- Sarah Jenazian as Brittany Sinclair

== Production ==
Shooting took place in Jefferson and Uncertain, Texas. The film was part of a dispute over funding between the director and an early investor. The matter was eventually taken to court.

== Release ==
Boggy Creek premiered at the sixth Texas Frightmare Weekend in April 2011. It was released on DVD and Blu-ray on September 13, 2011.

== Reception ==
Scott Foy of Dread Central rated it 1/5 stars, and wrote, "Boggy Creek doesn't work as drama, doesn't deliver as horror, and is no fun at all to watch", and while he in part praised the practical effects on the suits, was disappointed by the lack of action and actual usage of the Sasquatch itself, instead focusing on ineffective and dull character development. Paul Doro of Shock Till You Drop was also taken aback by the film's focus on melodrama as opposed to the monster and exploitation film it was billed as, calling it "low-rent amateur hour all around", as well as "a tedious bore and no fun whatsoever". Michael Allen of 28 Days Later Analysis praised the film's cinematography and filming locations, as well as appreciating the "lighter" scores in the soundtrack, with his largest complaint in regards to the movie being the writing which chose not to show impactful or gory scenes and was "uninspiring and lacking true horror elements".

=== Novelization ===
A novelization of the film entitled: Boggy Creek: The Legend is True was released in 2012.
