= Survive the Night =

2020 American action thriller film by Matt Eskandari

- Theatrical release poster
- Directed by: Matt Eskandari
- Written by: Doug Wolfe
- Produced by: Randall Emmett; George Furla; Shaun Sanghani; Adam Harris Engelhard; Mark Stewart
- Starring: Chad Michael Murray; Bruce Willis; Shea Buckner; Tyler Jon Olson; Lydia Hull; Jessica Abrams; Sara Lynn Holbrook; Jef Holbrook
- Cinematography: Bryan Koss
- Edited by: R. J. Cooper
- Music by: Nima Fakhrara
- Production companies: Grindstone Entertainment Group; Emmett Furla Oasis Films; SSS Entertainment
- Distributed by: Lionsgate
- Release dates: May 16, 2020 (Brazil); May 22, 2020 (U.S.)
- Running time: 90 minutes
- Country: United States
- Language: English
- Budget: $3.5 Million
- Box office: $220,371

Survive the Night (formerly titled The Long Night) is a 2020 American action thriller film directed by Matt Eskandari and starring Chad Michael Murray, Bruce Willis and Shea Buckner. The film was released in the United States on May 22, 2020.

== Plot ==
Two criminals, Jamie and Matthias, are involved in the attempted robbery of a garage that goes wrong: Jamie on a spur of the moment attempted to rob the garage, but the owner fought back. Jamie shoots a hostage, and Matthias gets shot in the leg. They escape, but Matthias needs medical attention. A disgraced physician (Chad Michael Murray) is taken hostage along with his family, after the two criminals break into the house and demand he remove a bullet from one of the criminal's legs.

However, the physician's father, Frank (Bruce Willis), finds that his wife had been killed. Rich successfully removes the bullet, but Frank sees an opportunity, suddenly picks up the scalpel, and cuts Jamie, who then grabs a large kitchen knife and stabs Frank, who escapes into the night. Rich threatens to cut Matthias' artery with a scalpel, but Jamie shoots him in the shoulder. Matthias is completely incapacitated, as Rich has not closed the wound and but only stemmed the blood flow by using surgical clamps. In the meantime, Frank has returned to the house to his dead wife, and looking through the window, he sees his wounded son. They meet in the garage, where Rich instructs Frank on dealing with his gunshot wound. Jamie and Matthias consider their options.

In the morning, Jamie decides to go find and kill the family. Jan and Riley are together in an outbuilding. Frank and Rich decide to fight back, Rich stuns Jamie in the Garage, and Frank lures Jamie away from the house in the car. Jamie subsequently returns to the house to look for the others. Rich and Jan meet up, but Jamie attacks Rich from behind and knocks him out. When Rich wakes up, he is back in the house, where Jamie forces him to complete the operation. Matthias dies during the operation. Meanwhile, Frank returns to the house and sets Jan free. Jamie threatens to shoot Rich but Jan stops him, shoots, misses, and runs out of the house with Jamie chasing after her. Rich grabs a gun and follows him and fatally shoots him. The family is all reunited on the front porch.

== Cast ==
- Bruce Willis as Frank Clark
- Chad Michael Murray as Rich Clark
- Shea Buckner as Jamie Granger
- Tyler Jon Olson as Matthias Granger
- Lydia Hull as Jan Clark
- Riley Wolfe Rach as Riley Clark
- Jessica Abrams as Rachel Clark
- Sara Lynn Holbrook as Woman in Store
- Jef Holbrook as Clerk

== Production ==
Principal photography took only ten days and was in Columbus, Georgia.

== Box office ==
As of August 27, 2022, Survive the Night grossed $220,371 in the United Arab Emirates, Portugal, and Vietnam.

== Reception ==
On the review aggregator website Rotten Tomatoes, 13% of 16 critics' reviews are positive, with an average rating of 3.8/10. Metacritic, which uses a weighted average, assigned the film a score of 26 out of 100, based on 4 critics, indicating "generally unfavorable" reviews.

=== Accolades ===
Award	Category	Recipient(s)	Result	Ref.
Golden Raspberry Awards	Worst Supporting Actor	Bruce Willis (also for Breach and Hard Kill)	Nominated	
