= Game of Assassins =

- Directed by: Matt Eskandari
- Screenplay by: Adam Lawson
- Produced by: Matt Eskandari; Jonathan Shih; Wellington Sun; Daniel Wei
- Starring: Warren Kole
- Cinematography: Brett Juskalian
- Edited by: R.J. Cooper
- Music by: Evan Evans
- Production company: Kingdom of Light Entertainment
- Distributed by: Lionsgate Home Entertainment
- Release date: October 10, 2013 (United States)
- Running time: 80 minutes
- Country: United States
- Language: English

Game of Assassins is a horror film directed by Matt Eskandari. The film was originally named The Gauntlet for the plot of the film.

== Cast ==
- Warren Kole as David Hellar
- Bai Ling as Kim Lee
- Jaime Ray Newman as Emma
- Dustin Nguyen as in-Soo
- Nick Lane as Tyler
- Jude Ciccolella as William Hellar

== Awards ==
It won the 2014 award for best horror film at the Indie Film Festival.
