= Wire Room =

2022 American film by Matt Eskandari

- Official release poster
- Directed by: Matt Eskandari
- Screenplay by: Brandon Stiefer
- Produced by: Randall Emmett; George Furla; Oliver Trevena; Norton Herrick; Ceasar Richbow; Mark Stewart; Noel Ashman
- Starring: Kevin Dillon; Bruce Willis
- Cinematography: Will Barratt
- Edited by: Chris Patterson
- Music by: Rhyan D'Errico; Jared Forman
- Production companies: Five Star Films; Emmett/Furla Oasis
- Distributed by: Lionsgate Films
- Release date: September 2, 2022
- Running time: 97 minutes
- Country: United States
- Language: English

Wire Room is a 2022 American action thriller film directed by Matt Eskandari, from a screenplay by Brandon Stiefer, and produced by Randall Emmett, George Furla, Oliver Trevena, Norton Herrick, Ceasar Richbow, Mark Stewart, and Noel Ashman. It stars Kevin Dillon and Bruce Willis.

Wire Room was released by Lionsgate Films in limited theaters and VOD on September 2, 2022, followed by its release on DVD and Blu-ray on October 11, 2022.

== Premise ==
While on Wire Room duty – a high-tech command center surveilling the most dangerous criminals – a federal agent listens in as the target is attacked in his home by a hit squad. Without burning the wire yet, he must protect the investigation and the target's life from the confines of a room fifty miles away.

== Cast ==
- Kevin Dillon as HSI Special Agent Justin Rosa
- Bruce Willis as Shane Mueller
- Oliver Trevena as Eddie Flynn
- Texas Battle as Sheriff Roberts
- Cameron Douglas as Mike Axum
- Shelby Cobb as Nour Holborow

== Production ==
In December 2021, Bruce Willis, Oliver Trevena, and Kevin Dillon signed on to star in the action film Wire Room. The film was directed by Matt Eskandari, from a screenplay by Brandon Stiefer, for Five Star Films, and Randall Emmett, George Furla, Norton Herrick, Ceasar Richbow, Mark Stewart, and Noel Ashman as producers alongside Trevena. Principal photography began in Birmingham, Alabama on December 20, 2021.

Wire Room is one of the last films to star Willis, who retired from acting because he was diagnosed with frontotemporal dementia.

== Release ==
Wire Room was released by Lionsgate Films in limited theaters and VOD on September 2, 2022, followed by its release on DVD and Blu-ray on October 11, 2022.

=== Critical response ===
On the review aggregator website Rotten Tomatoes, 0% of 5 critics' reviews are positive.

Leo Faierman, of Screen Rant, gave the film a negative review, explaining that it "is a crooked cop action drama that plays out like low-budget, straight-to-VHS schlock from decades past". Robert Kojder, of Flickering Myth, gave the film a 1.5/5, saying "Wire Room takes 95% of its running time to deliver a passable action sequence, using the term passable loosely". Brian Orndorf, of Blu-ray.com, gave a negative review, writing "another forgettable Emmett and Furla production determined to simply be product, not an exciting presentation of escapism with concentration on highly cinematic twists and turns." Mark Dujsik, of Mark Reviews Movies, gave the film a one out of four, saying "our incompetent protagonist is in good company behind the camera, too." Brian Costello, of Common Sense Media, gave the film a 1/5 rating, writing: "It's a little too easy to pick on this movie, and not really worth the time for anyone to bother watching it".
