= Texas Battle =

American actor

- Born: Texas Quency Battle; Houston, Texas, U.S.
- Occupation: Actor
- Years active: 2002–present

Texas Quency Battle is an American film and television actor, best known for his role as Marcus Forrester on the CBS soap opera The Bold and the Beautiful.

== Career ==
In May 2008, Texas Battle was cast on the CBS soap opera The Bold and the Beautiful playing a character named Marcus Forrester. The new actor came onto the show as the first African American with an in-depth story line. Battle commented on the huge role, stating "It really does feel good that the writers/producers of the show, really have trust in me on bringing this new character to life. I'm happy to be a part of a show that really has a family feeling. Every one of my cast members is fun to work with. Makes you feel good to get up in the morning, and go to work doing something you love."

Battle is best known for his roles in the films Coach Carter, Final Destination 3, Wrong Turn 2: Dead End, and Dragonball Evolution. In 2011, he appeared in the remake of The Legend of Boggy Creek as Tommy Davis. Battle portrayed Dixon in the After Dark Originals film The Task. Battle also co-starred in Death Valley, which airs on MTV.

== Filmography ==
=== Film ===
| Year | Title | Role | Notes |
|---|---|---|---|
| 2005 | Coach Carter | Maddux | |
| 2006 | Final Destination 3 | Lewis Romero | |
| 2006 | Even Money | Darius Jackson | |
| 2007 | Wrong Turn 2: Dead End | Jake Washington | |
| 2008 | Hitting the Bricks | Mello | |
| 2008 | Senior Skip Day | Lamar Washington | |
| 2009 | Dragonball Evolution | Carey Fuller | |
| 2011 | The Task | Dixon | |
| 2011 | Boggy Creek | Tommy Davis | |
| 2016 | Marauders | T.J. Jackson | |
| 2016 | Greater | Anthony Lucas | |
| 2018 | F.R.E.D.I. | Brody | |
| 2019 | 10 Minutes Gone | Richard | |
| 2019 | Trauma Center | Sergeant Tull | |
| 2020 | Hard Kill | Nicholas Fox | |
| 2022 | Blowback | Detective Owens | |
| 2022 | Wrong Place | Captain Craig East | |
| 2022 | Wire Room | Sergeant Peter Roberts | |
| 2023 | Ruthless | Martin | |
| 2024 | Wineville | Joh Hicks | |
| 2025 | The Wraith | Sheriff Watkins | |
| 2025 | Desert Dawn | Sal Read | |
| TBA | Dead and Breakfast | TBA | Post-production |

=== Television ===
| Year | Title | Role | Notes |
|---|---|---|---|
| 2002 | 7 Lives Xposed | Curt | 4 episodes |
| 2002 | Urban Legends | Dave | Episode: "Killer Sex" |
| 2005 | Committed | Tony | Episode: "The Snow Episode" |
| 2005 | All of Us | Thomas Harper | 2 episodes |
| 2005–2006 | One Tree Hill | Tony Battle | 2 episodes |
| 2008 | 12 Miles of Bad Road | Keeshawn Diamond | 3 episodes |
| 2008–2013 | The Bold and the Beautiful | Marcus Forrester | Main role (337 episodes) |
| 2009 | Hydra | Ronnie Kaplan | TV movie |
| 2009 | Sherri | Russell | 2 episodes |
| 2011 | Milf Money | Eric | TV movie |
| 2011 | Death Valley | Officer John Johnson | 12 episodes |
| 2013–2014 | SAF3 | Texas Daly | 20 episodes |
| 2016 | Second Sight | Tony | TV movie |
| 2018 | Strange Angel | Murphy | Episode: "Ritual of the Rival Tribes" |
| 2018–2020 | 5th Ward The Series | Tony | 5 episodes |
| 2022 | Magnum P.I. | Oscar Woods | Episode: "Shallow Grave, Deep Water" |

== Awards and nominations ==
| Year | Award | Work | Result | Ref |
|---|---|---|---|---|
| 2009 | NAACP Image Award for Outstanding Actor in a Daytime Drama Series | The Bold and the Beautiful | Nominated | |
| 2010 | NAACP Image Award for Outstanding Actor in a Daytime Drama Series | The Bold and the Beautiful | Nominated | |
| 2012 | NAACP Image Award for Outstanding Actor in a Daytime Drama Series | The Bold and the Beautiful | Nominated | |
