= The Escape of Prisoner 614 =

- Film poster
- Directed by: Zach Golden
- Written by: Zach Golden
- Produced by: Jordan Yale Levine; Jordan Beckerman; Shaun Sanghani
- Starring: Ron Perlman; Martin Starr; Jake McDorman; George Sample III
- Cinematography: Adam Lee
- Edited by: Adam Lee
- Music by: Martin Crane
- Production companies: Yale Productions; Film Mode Entertainment; SSS Entertainment; Wing & A Prayer Pictures
- Distributed by: Saban Films
- Release date: April 27, 2018
- Running time: 95 minutes
- Country: United States
- Language: English

The Escape of Prisoner 614 is a 2018 American Western comedy written and directed by Zach Golden and starring Ron Perlman, Martin Starr, Jake McDorman and George Sample III.

== Cast ==
- Ron Perlman
- Martin Starr
- Jake McDorman
- George Sample III as Prisoner Andre
- Sondra James
- John Hickman
- Michael Sirow

== Reception ==
The film has a 20% rating on Rotten Tomatoes. Glenn Kenny of RogerEbert.com awarded the film two and a half stars.

Luke Y. Thompson of Forbes gave the film a positive review and wrote, "More of an absurdist comedy than an uproarious one, this mostly works because McDorman and Starr play things completely seriously."

Frank Scheck of The Hollywood Reporter gave the film a negative review and wrote, "this satirical, modern-day Western induces a few mild chuckles but mostly wastes the talents of its cast."
