= Hard Kill =

2020 film by Matt Eskandari

- Promotional release poster
- Directed by: Matt Eskandari
- Screenplay by: Joe Russo; Chris LaMont
- Story by: Nikolai From; Clayton Haugen
- Produced by: Randall Emmett; George Furla; Shaun Sanghani; Alex Eckert; Tim Sullivan; Mark Stewart
- Starring: Jesse Metcalfe; Bruce Willis; Natalie Eva Marie; Lala Kent; Texas Battle; Swen Temmel; Sergio Rizzulto; Tyler Jon Olson; Jon Galanis
- Cinematography: Bryan Koss
- Edited by: R.J. Cooper
- Music by: Rhyan D'Errico
- Production companies: Emmett Furla Oasis Films; SSS Entertainment
- Distributed by: Vertical Entertainment
- Release date: August 21, 2020
- Running time: 98 minutes
- Country: United States
- Language: English
- Box office: $111,523

Hard Kill is a 2020 American action thriller film directed by Matt Eskandari, starring Jesse Metcalfe, Bruce Willis, Natalie Eva Marie, Lala Kent, Texas Battle, Swen Temmel, Sergio Rizzulto, Tyler Jon Olson, and Jon Galanis. The film follows a CEO who hires a group of mercenaries to retrieve both a piece of technology and his kidnapped daughter. It was released on August 21, 2020, by Vertical Entertainment, and was critically panned.

== Plot ==
Upset that her revolutionary technology will be misused for military purposes, Eva Chalmers approaches an extremist known as the Pardoner, who promises to help her use it to save the world. When she balks at his terrorist plans, he takes her hostage and attempts to coerce her father, Donovan, into revealing the code to activate it. Donovan hires a team of mercenaries led by Derek Miller to rescue Eva and recover the tech.

== Cast ==
- Jesse Metcalfe as Derek Miller
- Bruce Willis as Donovan Chalmers
- Natalie Eva Marie as Sasha
- Lala Kent as Eva Chalmers
- Texas Battle as Nicholas Fox
- Swen Temmel as Dash Hawkins
- Sergio Rizzuto as the Pardoner
- Tyler Jon Olson as Lt. Colton
- Jon Galanis as Harrison Zindel
- Jacquie Nguyen as Gemma
- Leslee Emmett as Crystal

== Production ==
Principal photography began in January 2020 in Cincinnati, under the working title Open Source. According to the Los Angeles Times and actress Lala Kent, an incident occurred on set when co-star Bruce Willis accidentally fired a prop gun loaded with blanks on the wrong cue and repeated the same error during a second take. Nobody was injured, but the situation reportedly left some crew members "shaken". Hard Kill is one of the last films to star Willis, who retired from acting because he was diagnosed with aphasia.

== Release ==
Hard Kill was simultaneously released in limited theaters and video on-demand in the United States on August 21, 2020. It then became available to stream on Netflix in the USA on November 23, 2020, and was the top streamed film for several weeks.

=== Box office ===
As of October 29, 2020, Hard Kill grossed $111,523 in the United Arab Emirates, Saudi Arabia, and Vietnam.

== Reception ==
On the review aggregator website Rotten Tomatoes, 0% of 20 critics' reviews are positive, with an average rating of 2.7/10.

Frank Scheck of The Hollywood Reporter said that Willis "seems to have settled on making listless appearances in forgettable B-movie action movies as a retirement funding plan". He said that although Metcalfe "boasts the appropriate physicality" for his role, he is "unable to summon sufficient charisma to make his character remotely interesting". Scheck called the other performances "equally lackluster" except for Marie, who "makes for a convincing female badass". Kevin Maher of The Times gave the film 1/5 stars, writing: "I can only hope that Bruce Willis managed to squeeze a house out of the producers of this breathtakingly poor mess about a, ahem, 'quantum' military computer program that can either destroy the world or save it."

=== Accolades ===
Award	Category	Recipient(s)	Result	Ref.
Golden Raspberry Awards	Worst Supporting Actor	Bruce Willis (also for Breach and Survive the Night)	Nominated	

== See also ==
- List of films with a 0% rating on Rotten Tomatoes
