= State of Emergency (2011 film) =

- Film poster
- Directed by: Turner Clay
- Written by: Turner Clay
- Produced by: John Will Clay; Turner Clay
- Starring: Jay Hayden; Tori White; Scott Lilly; Kathryn Todd Norman; McKenna Jones
- Cinematography: Tony Oberstar
- Edited by: Turner Clay
- Music by: Turner Clay
- Production company
- Distributed by: Image Entertainment
- Release date: October 5, 2011 (Raindance Film Festival)
- Running time: 89 minutes
- Country: United States
- Language: English
- Budget: Undisclosed, presumably low budget
- Box office: N/A, Released on DVDs

State of Emergency is a 2011 American horror film written and directed by Turner Clay. It stars Jay Hayden, Tori White, Scott Lilly, and Kathryn Todd Norman as survivors of a neurotoxin quarantine who have to survive an assault by the infected.

== Plot ==
After a chemical plant explodes, the military quarantines the surrounding area. Jim helplessly watches his girlfriend Emilie die of a wound sustained while trying to find safety, and he retreats to a farmhouse. Sporadic media reports indicate that the chemical plant may have stored biological weapons that are responsible for mutating people into rabid cannibals. He seeks help from the ubiquitous military helicopters that patrol the area, but it is to no avail. However, his efforts are noticed by survivors holed up nearby in a warehouse, and he joins them: Scott, Scott's wife Julie, and Ix, a quiet and unfriendly survivor that they had rescued.

Ix initially snaps at Jim for inadvertently taking her candy and rejects his offers of friendship, but she slowly warms to him. Ix reveals that her failure to find a job or any friends in a new city led her to return home to live with her parents. There, she and her parents clashed over her lifestyle, and she stopped talking to them. Before she could apologize for her behavior, her parents died during the quarantine. Jim and Ix bond over their loneliness and feelings of loss, though Ix continues to keep her diabetes a secret from everyone. After she falls into a diabetic coma, Jim leaves the warehouse to find insulin for her.

Jim evades zombies and recovers insulin in emergency supplies airdropped by the military. When he returns to the warehouse, Jim saves Scott from a zombie attack. During the night, zombies break in the warehouse, and the survivors retreat upstairs into the offices. While clearing the warehouse, Jim discovers a squad of Marines, and they tranquilize him. He wakes up in an observation room, shackled to a chair. Through a glass window, a scientist explains to Jim that the chemical plant released a neurotoxin into the air that caused people to go homicidal, but tests reveal that Jim, Scott, Julie, and Ix are clean. The scientist apologizes to Jim and tells him that they're all free to go. After the group reunites, Jim and Ix embrace.

== Cast ==
- Jay Hayden as Jim
- Tori White as Ix
- Scott Lilly as Scott
- Kathryn Todd Norman as Julie
- McKenna Jones as Emilie

== Release ==
State of Emergency premiere on October 5, 2011, at Raindance Film Festival. Image Entertainment released it on home video on April 16, 2013.

== Reception ==
Mark L. Miller of Ain't It Cool News wrote that the film is highly reminiscent of 28 Days Later, but there are enough good scenes and performances by the actors to make up for it. David Maine of Pop Matters rated it 5/10 stars and said that the technical aspects were impressive, but the acting was at times weak. In a mixed review, Electric Sheep Magazine stated that the film is too straightforward to stand out in such a saturated subgenre.

== See also ==
- List of films featuring diabetes
