= The Governor's Wife =

- Genre: Reality
- Starring: Edwin Edwards; Trina Edwards
- Country of origin: United States
- Original language: English
- No. of seasons: 1
- No. of episodes: 8

Production
- Executive producers: Brent Montgomery; David George; Devon Graham; Dominick Pupa; Drew Tappon; Shaun Sanghani; Will Nothacker
- Running time: 22 minutes
- Production companies: Leftfield Pictures; SSS Entertainment

Original release
- Network: A&E
- Release: October 27 – November 17, 2013

The Governor's Wife is an American reality television series that premiered on October 27, 2013, and aired on A&E. It chronicled the lives of former Louisiana governor, Edwin Edwards, his third wife Trina Edwards and their family. Trina Edwards was approached by producer about doing a reality show shortly after she and Edwin married on July 30, 2011. The former governor was not long out of federal prison, where he served 8 1/2 years for bribery and extortion.

== Cast ==
- Edwin Edwards, age: 86
- Trina Edwards, age: 35, Edwin's wife
- Anna Edwards, age: 63, Edwin's daughter and Trina's stepdaughter
- Victoria Edwards, age: 61, Edwin's daughter and Trina's stepdaughter
- Logan and Trevor, age: 16 and 14, Trina's sons and Edwin's stepsons

== Episodes ==
Season	Episodes	Originally released	
Season	Episodes	First released	Last released
1	8	October 27, 2013	November 10, 2013

=== Season 1 (2013) ===
No.	Title	Original release date	Prod. code	US viewers (millions)
1	"Happy Birthday, Mr. Governor"	October 27, 2013	100	1.24
2	"If At First You Don't Succeed..."	October 27, 2013	101	N/A
3	"It's My Party"	November 3, 2013	102	1.00
4	"Edwin's Will"	November 3, 2013	103	N/A
5	"21st Century Dad"	November 10, 2013	104	N/A
6	"Family Feud"	November 10, 2013	105	N/A
7	"Supermodel/Model Citizen"	November 17, 2013	106	N/A
8	"Oh Baby!"	November 17, 2013	107	N/A
