= Dead and Breakfast (upcoming film) =

Film by J.P. Loppo Martinez

- Directed by: J.P. Loppo Martinez
- Written by: J.P. Loppo Martinez
- Produced by: Eduard Osipov; Al Bravo; RJ Collins
- Starring: Dermot Mulroney; William Moseley; Chris Mullinax; Texas Battle
- Production companies: Beno Films; Al Bravo Films
- Country: United States
- Language: English

Dead and Breakfast is an upcoming American horror thriller film written and directed by J.P. Loppo Martinez, produced by Eduard Osipov, Al Bravo and RJ Collins, and starring Dermot Mulroney, William Moseley, Chris Mullinax and Texas Battle.

== Cast ==
- Dermot Mulroney
- William Moseley
- Elin Petersdottir
- Chris Mullinax
- Texas Battle

== Production ==
=== Filming ===
In June 2024, it was announced that a horror thriller film written and directed by J.P. Loppo Martinez had wrapped principal photography, with Dermot Mulroney, William Moseley, Chris Mullinax, and Texas Battle joining the cast.
