= List of films featuring diabetes =

There is a body of films that include a character with diabetes as part of the plot. In the late twentieth century, most films' references to diabetes were minor. Characters with diabetes were developed in plots in which the disease "played a more significant role" in films such as Steel Magnolias and Panic Room. Dr. Kevin L. Ferguson discussed such films in the Journal of Medical Humanities and reported, "Films that represent diabetes must work around the disease's banal invisibility, and images of diabetics in film are especially susceptible to metaphor and exaggeration." Everyday Health reported, "Sometimes, filmmakers get it wrong: mixing up different types of diabetes, imagining symptoms or complications that aren't accurate, or unfairly portraying another aspect of the condition."

== List of films ==
| Film | Year | Description |
|---|---|---|
| 12 Feet Deep | 2017 | The American thriller film features twin sisters who are trapped in a swimming pool under a fiberglass pool cover. One of the sisters has diabetes and needs an insulin shot to avoid slipping into a coma. |
| 150 Milligrams | 2017 | The French drama film is based on the real-life French pulmonologist Irène Frachon who fought between 2009 and 2011 to reveal that a diabetes drug was life-threatening. |
| The Accountant | 2016 | A film about a forensic accountant who is also an assassin. In the film, an assassination victim dies by insulin overdose to protect his family from violence. |
| After Dark, My Sweet | 1990 | A kidnapped child turns out to be diabetic, and after unwittingly feeding him pie, the kidnappers must steal and inject insulin to prevent him from dying (they seem to do so intravenously). |
| Alma | 1999 | A documentary film about Alma Thorpe, whose primary condition is schizophrenia, but she also has diabetes. |
| The Ambulance | 1990 | A rogue doctor in an ambulance kidnaps people with diabetes for his experiment. |
| The Baby-Sitters Club | 1995 | Amidst various interpersonal dramas among the members of the club, Stacey grapples with revealing her diabetes to her older boyfriend, Luca. |
| Battle Royale II: Requiem | 2003 | A diabetic schoolgirl is sent on a mission with other students to kill a terrorist but only has three days' worth of insulin with her. |
| Beats, Rhymes & Life | 2011 | A documentary film about the band A Tribe Called Quest, including Phife Dawg, who has diabetes. |
| Big Nothing | 2006 | In the black comedy film, criminals kill an FBI agent with diabetes by force-feeding him a lollipop. |
| Bread and Roses | 2000 | A married couple has financial difficulties because the husband has diabetes. |
| Brokedown Palace | 1999 | The father of one of the wrongfully imprisoned women has diabetes. |
| Broken | 2012 | The coming-of-age film stars an 11-year-old child who is learning to manage diabetes. |
| Chocolat | 2000 | An elderly woman in the film hides her diabetes from her family. |
| Click | 2006 | Michael Newman navigates the challenges of work, family, and a magical remote control that controls reality, while also contending with the implications of his father's diabetes-related complications. |
| Cliffhanger | 1993 | The female pilot of the criminal gang radios for emergency backup, saying that they need insulin for a person with diabetes. |
| Con Air | 1997 | Sgt. Cameron Poe, recently paroled, boards a prison transport plane filled with dangerous convicts that gets hijacked, all while trying to secure insulin for his diabetic cellmate, Mike "Baby-O" O'Dell. |
| The Confessional | 1995 | A family mystery is investigated, and hereditary diabetes is a clue in establishing a family link. |
| A Deadly Adoption | 2015 | In a parody of melodramatic films screened on the TV network Lifetime, two parents see their daughter fall into a diabetic coma. |
| Derailed | 2005 | Charles Schine, an advertising executive, gets entangled in a blackmail scheme after an illicit affair, forcing him to embezzle money intended for his daughter's expensive type 1 diabetes medication. |
| The Diabetic | 2023 | A lonely and irreverent 30 year old Type 1 Diabetic named Alek returns to his hometown to re-live his teenage 'glory days.' |
| Dog Day Afternoon | 1975 | The manager of the bank at which the robbery takes place has diabetes and is threatened by the hostage taking, as he needs medication. |
| Fed Up | 2014 | The documentary film highlights that too much sugar in American diets is a strong reason for the prevalence of diabetes mellitus type 2 in the United States. |
| The Founder | 2016 | In the biographical film about the creator of the McDonald's fast food chain, one of the McDonald brothers is hospitalized due to a stress-induced diabetes shock, and founder-to-be Ray Kroc visits him in the hospital to offer to buy out the brothers' restaurant. |
| The General | 1998 | The titular Irish crime boss Martin Cahill develops type 2 diabetes. |
| Gigli | 2003 | A character with diabetes is helped by another character. |
| Glory Enough for All | 1988 | A dramatized account of the discovery of insulin by Frederick Banting and Charles Best researching at the University of Toronto in 1921–22. The film focuses on Elizabeth Hughes, a seriously sick diabetic girl who is one of the first to receive the miracle treatment. |
| The Godfather Part III | 1990 | The film's crime boss, Michael Corleone, suffers from diabetes. |
| Greenland | 2020 | The son, Nathan, has diabetes, affecting their evacuation. |
| Gubra | 2006 | When a woman's father is hospitalized due to diabetic complications, she meets a man with whom she falls in love. |
| Half Baked | 1998 | The stoner comedy film features a horse with diabetes. |
| Hansel & Gretel: Witch Hunters | 2013 | As a result of consuming too much candy in Hansel and Gretel, Hansel contracts diabetes and must periodically inject insulin. |
| The Hospital | 1971 | Dr. Schaefer, a diabetic, is murdered by an insulin overdose. |
| It Runs in the Family | 2003 | The protagonist's wife suffers from complications from diabetes and is on dialysis due to kidney failure. |
| Jerry and Tom | 1998 | The film's hitman suffers from diabetes. |
| Just Before Dawn | 1946 | A criminal psychologist is tricked into injecting a person with diabetes with poison instead of the insulin needed. |
| Killers of the Flower Moon | 2023 | Mollie, and a number of the Osage, have diabetes; Mollie begins treatment with insulin as it is introduced, which is later used to slowly poison her by her husband Ernest Burkhart. |
| Mad Money | 2008 | Bridget Cardigan teams up with Nina and Jackie to steal old dollar bills set for destruction at the Federal Reserve Bank, and their heist becomes complicated, with one of the bank robbers suffering from diabetes. |
| Meeting Daddy | 2000 | The colonel in the film has diabetes and uses a glucometer to monitor himself. |
| Memento | 2000 | In a side plot, a man with amnesia treats his wife with diabetes. |
| The Next Three Days | 2010 | A husband attempts an escape plan for his wrongfully imprisoned wife, who has diabetes. |
| No Good Deed | 2002 | The film's police officer is shown performing a self-maintenance routine for diabetes. |
| Nothing in Common | 1986 | The protagonist's parents divorce, and he learns that his father has diabetes and has been avoiding treatment. |
| Over the Brooklyn Bridge | 1984 | The lead character Alby (played by Elliott Gould) has diabetes. |
| Panic Room | 2002 | A young girl with diabetes and her mother are trapped in a safe room during a home invasion. |
| Patch Adams | 1998 | The comedy-drama film, based on Dr. Hunter "Patch" Adams, depicts a scene in which medical residents scrutinize a patient with diabetes, and Adams, unlike the others, asks for the patient's name. |
| Paul Blart: Mall Cop | 2009 | Paul Blart fails his police exam because of symptoms of diabetes, mainly hypoglycemia. |
| Paul Blart: Mall Cop 2 | 2015 | In previous movies, Paul Blart fails his police exam because of symptoms of diabetes, mainly hypoglycemia. |
| The Planet of Junior Brown | 2000 | A character with diabetes is helped by another character. |
| Promised a Miracle | 1988 | The American television film dramatizes the true story of Christian parents who believed their 11-year-old son's diabetes were healed by God and discarded his insulin, resulting in their son's death. |
| Regarding Henry | 1991 | The film's attorney, recovering from a shooting, meets an elderly man with diabetes. |
| Reversal of Fortune | 1990 | A husband defends against charges that he killed his wife who had diabetes. |
| The Right Hand Man | 1987 | Based on the historical novel The Right-Hand Man, the film is set in Australia in 1860 and features a protagonist with diabetes. |
| S/O Satyamurthy | 2015 | A man meets a woman with diabetes and develops a relationship with her. |
| Scarecrow Gone Wild | 2004 | A college-age man suffers a diabetic shock as a result of a prank but is resurrected as a killer scarecrow. |
| Soul Food | 1997 | A matriarch's refusal to address her diabetes leads to her death and her family falling apart. |
| Species | 1995 | An alien seductress rejects and kills a candidate mate because he has diabetes. |
| Split | 2016 | One of the multiple personalities played by James McAvoy has diabetes and is shown injecting insulin, while none of the other personalities has diabetes. |
| State of Emergency | 2011 | In the horror film, survivors of a zombie outbreak hide in a warehouse. One of the survivors hides her diabetes from the others, but when she falls into a coma, another survivor goes out to find insulin for her. |
| Steel Magnolias | 1989 | Set in a close-knit Louisiana community, Shelby battles Type 1 diabetes and its complications, leading her to face life-altering decisions about motherhood, love, and sacrifice, all against the backdrop of the deep bond she shares with her mother, M'Lynn, and their group of supportive friends. |
| Tammy | 2014 | After a series of personal mishaps, Tammy embarks on a chaotic road trip with her hard-drinking grandmother Pearl, who has diabetes but defiantly refuses medication, leading them on an adventure filled with mishaps, crimes, and unexpected bonds. |
| That's My Boy | 2012 | The comedy film features the relationship between a father and his son. In the son's childhood, he is obese and has diabetes due to his father's lack of care. |
| This Old Cub | 2004 | A documentary film about baseball player Ron Santo, who has diabetes. |
| To Kill a Man | 2014 | A caretaker of a forest preserve has diabetes; when his medicine is stolen, his son's attempt to recover the medicine leads to the family being terrorized by the criminal gang. |
| Warlock | 1989 | A witch-hunter from the 17th century pursues a malevolent warlock to 20th century Los Angeles, and with the help of Kassandra, a woman cursed by the Warlock and who manages her diabetes with insulin, they work to prevent him from reassembling a powerful book that could end Creation. |
| The Weavers: Wasn't That a Time! | 1982 | The documentary film shows the band The Weavers, including bass vocalist Lee Hays, who had diabetes. |
| What Keeps You Alive | 2018 | In this Canadian thriller, a psychopathic woman with diabetes attacks and (apparently) murders her wife. The victim, however, obtains posthumous revenge by having first poisoned her wife's insulin. |
| What the Health | 2017 | The documentary film explores health risks associated with the meat industry and says that several studies show that meat consumption is a leading cause of diabetes. |
| Who Killed Mary What's 'Er Name? | 1971 | The film amateur sleuth has diabetes and is helped by another character. |
| The Witches | 1990 | The young protagonist's grandmother has diabetes. |
| Wonderful World | 2009 | The protagonist's roommate is hospitalized for treatment of a coma due to diabetes. The protagonist falls in love with his roommate's sister, who comes to visit. |
| Sugarless | 2022 | The protagonist is diagnosed with type 2 diabetes, but chooses to conceal it from his lover. |

Purple heart 2023

== Bibliography ==
- Ferguson, Kevin L. (September 2010). "The Cinema of Control: On Diabetic Excess and Illness in Film". Journal of Medical Humanities. 31 (3): 183–204. doi:10.1007/s10912-010-9110-8. ISSN 1041-3545. PMID 20376543. S2CID 27743573.
