= Shaun Sanghani =

American film producer and writer (born 1980)

- Born: June 28, 1980 (age 46)
- Education: Tulane University Freeman School of Business USC School of Cinematic Arts
- Occupations: Film producer, screenwriter

Shaun S. Sanghani (born June 28, 1980) is an American film producer, financier and writer. He is the founder and president of SSS Entertainment and SSS Film Capital. He is best known as the producer of The Fallout, The Last Full Measure, King Cobra, Alone Together, and American Traitor: The Trial of Axis Sally.

== Early life and education ==
Sanghani was born in Cleveland, Ohio, on June 28, 1980, and raised in Alexandria, Louisiana. In 1998, he moved to New Orleans, Louisiana, to attend Tulane University, from which he received a Bachelor of Arts in Psychology. In 2003, he earned an MBA in Finance/Marketing from Tulane University's A. B. Freeman School of Business. He later enrolled at the USC School of Cinematic Arts, from which he would earn a Master of Fine Arts in Screenwriting.

== Career ==
In 2007, Sanghani founded film production company SSS Entertainment. Since the company's inception, he has been credited as the producer of over 60 films, including Class Rank (2017), The Last Full Measure (2019), and Axis Sally (2020).

In 2018, Variety magazine named Sanghani as one of its annual "10 Producers to Watch".

In 2019, Sanghani partnered with Louisiana-based Red River Bank to form SSS Film Capital, a film fund & financing unit of SSS Entertainment. Sanghani has stated that the unit, which includes a multimillion-dollar credit facility, was created in order to "grow our slate and move into bigger-budget fare with bigger talent".

Following the premiere of South by Southwest Grand Jury Award winner The Fallout (film), SSS Entertainment announced the launch of The Syndicate, a sales arm focused on "accessible and recognizable" features, debuting with upcoming films Alone Together, starring and directed by Katie Holmes, and Neil Labute's House of Darkness. At the time, Sanghani commented on SSS Film Capital's success throughout the COVID-19 pandemic.

In 2022, SSS Entertainment disclosed the beginning of ongoing talks with a group of U.S. private equity firms.

== Filmography ==
=== Film ===
Producer

- White Rabbit (2013)
- All Mistakes Buried (2015) (Also writer)
- King Cobra (2016)
- Welcome to Willits (2016)
- Class Rank (2017)
- Blood Heist (2017)
- Blood Ride (2017)
- Blood Surf (2017)
- Avengers of Justice: Farce Wars (2018)
- Kill the Czar (2018)
- The Escape of Prisoner 614 (2018)
- The Last Full Measure (2019)
- Pretenders (2018)
- 10 Minutes Gone (2019)
- Infamous (2020)
- Survive the Night (2020)
- Hard Kill (2020)
- Force of Nature (2020)
- Last Survivors (2021)
- American Traitor: The Trial of Axis Sally (2021)
- The Fallout (2021)
- Gone in the Night (2022)
- The Last Victim (2022)
- Panama (2022)
- Savage Salvation (2022)
- Private Property (2022)
- Alone Together (2022)
- House of Darkness (2022)
- The Good Mother (2023)
- Blackwater Lane (2024)
- Bad Man (2025)
- Pose (2025)
- Twilight of the Dead (2027)

Executive producer

- True Crime: The Movie (2012)
- Jack Goes Home (2016)
- The Vault (2017)
- Welcome the Stranger (2018)
- Brampton’s Own (2018)
- River Runs Red (2018)
- Crypto (2019)
- The Informer (2019)
- Burn (2019)
- The Sound of Silence (2019)
- Bailey & Darla (2020)
- I Used to Go Here (2020)
- Son of the South (film) (2020)
- Midnight in the Switchgrass (2021)
- The Birthday Cake (2021)
- Catch the Fair One (2021)

=== Television ===
Year	Title	Writer	Creator	Executive Producer
2009	Guardian Angels	Yes	Yes	co-executive
2013	The Governor's Wife	Yes	Yes	Yes
2013	Girls Gone Bayou	Yes	Yes	Yes
2013	Hardcore Hobbies	Yes	Yes	Yes
