= Trauma Center (film) =

2019 action thriller film directed by Matt Eskandari

- Film poster
- Directed by: Matt Eskandari
- Written by: Paul Da Silva
- Produced by: Randall Emmett; George Furla; Luillo Ruiz; Mark Stewart; Matthew Helderman; Luke Taylor; Grady Craig; Tyler Gould
- Starring: Bruce Willis; Nicky Whelan
- Cinematography: Bryan Koss
- Edited by: R.J. Cooper
- Music by: Nima Fakhrara
- Production companies: Grindstone Entertainment Group; Emmett Furla Oasis Films; The Pimienta Film Co.
- Distributed by: Lionsgate
- Release date: December 6, 2019 (United States)
- Running time: 87 minutes
- Country: United States
- Language: English
- Box office: $92,968

Trauma Center is a 2019 American action thriller film directed by Matt Eskandari. The film stars Bruce Willis and Nicky Whelan.

== Synopsis ==
In San Juan, Puerto Rico, Madison Taylor (Nicky Whelan) is injured when she's caught in the crossfire of two corrupt cops, Pierce (Tito Ortiz) and Tull (Texas Battle).

Madison wakes up in a hospital and as a witness of one of their vicious crimes, she’s placed under the protection of respected police lieutenant Steve Wakes (Bruce Willis). Madison's misfortune turns into a real nightmare when Pierce and Tull turn up to finish the job, realizing she is the key to tracing them back to the crime.

Trapped and hunted by Pierce and Tull inside the locked-down hospital, Madison desperately calls Wakes for help. But she must use her surroundings to fight back alone during this night of survival if there is any hope of making it out of the hospital alive.

== Cast ==
- Bruce Willis as Lt. Steve Wakes
- Nicky Whelan as Madison Taylor
- Tito Ortiz as Det. Pierce
- Texas Battle as Sergeant Tull
- Lynn Gilmartin as Nurse Crystal
- Catherine Davis as Emily Taylor
- Lala Kent as Renee
- Sergio Rizzuto as Marcos
- Tyler Jon Olson as Det. Tony Martin
- Jesse Pruett as Customer Phil
- Steve Guttenberg as Dr. Jones
- Heather Johansen as Nurse Rachel

== Reception ==
On the review aggregator website Rotten Tomatoes, 20% of 5 critics' reviews are positive, with an average rating of 3.6/10.

== Box office ==
As of April 28, 2020, Trauma Center grossed $92,968 in the United Arab Emirates and Portugal.
