= 12 Feet Deep =

- Promotional poster
- Directed by: Matt Eskandari
- Written by: Matt Eskandari; Michael Hultquist
- Produced by: Mark Myers
- Starring: Alexandra Park; Nora-Jane Noone; Tobin Bell; Diane Farr
- Cinematography: Byron Werner
- Edited by: Ryan Cooper
- Music by: Todd Haberman
- Distributed by: Mar Vista Entertainment
- Release date: June 20, 2017
- Running time: 85 minutes
- Country: United States
- Language: English
- Box office: $6,158

12 Feet Deep (originally titled The Deep End) is a 2017 American psychological horror-thriller film written and directed by Matt Eskandari. It stars Alexandra Park and Nora-Jane Noone as sisters who find themselves trapped inside a public swimming pool when the manager activates the pool cover and leaves for the holidays. Released by Mar Vista Entertainment on June 20, 2017, it received generally positive reviews.

== Plot ==
Bree goes for a swim at the Ketea Aquatic Center and is joined in the Olympic-sized pool by her sister, Jonna, a recovering drug addict who is three months clean. When the pool manager, McGradey, catches the janitor, Clara, who is an ex-convict on parole, attempting to steal from the lost and found, he fires her and tells her to clean up. He then asks the customers to leave as the pool is closing for the holiday. While packing up, Bree notices her engagement ring is missing. Jonna sees the ring, stuck in the metal grille at the bottom of the pool and both dive in to retrieve it. McGradey, unaware the women are in the deep end, engages the fiberglass pool cover and leaves.

Terrified, the siblings attempt to push the pool cover up or break through it, unsuccessfully. They find only one small hole. Jonna confesses she threw the ring into the pool because she is envious of Bree's successful lifestyle and recent engagement. Bree is angry at first, but then opens up about their abusive, alcoholic, drug-addicted father and the fire that led to his death. She reveals she is diabetic and requires insulin or she may fall into a diabetic coma.

Clara, preparing to leave, sees the sisters. She steals Bree's cash, smartphone and credit card and says she will release them if Bree reveals her phone password and credit card PIN. Bree does so, but Clara turns the water heater off and leaves the sisters trapped for the whole night. Next morning, Clara returns to taunt them again. Jonna, angry, leads Clara to place her ear onto the small hole in the pool cover and stabs her in the ear with a shard of tile. In retaliation, Clara turns on the automatic pool cleaning system, causing the girls to begin suffocating in chlorine, but she turns it off again when she realises the possible consequences and leaves.

Bree reveals to Jonna that during the accident that killed their father, she purposely prevented their father from escaping, calling him a monster as he had been sexually abusing the girls during their adolescence. Meanwhile, Clara returns, having realized the error of her ways. She tries to open the pool cover but her passcode no longer works. She tells the sisters they are on their own and leaves again.

Bree grows weak. Jonna succeeds in ripping the metal grill off the bottom of the pool, something Bree had previously tried and failed to do. She smashes the pool cover and they escape. Jonna gives Bree her insulin shot. Clara returns with a gun, threatening to kill the sisters as she does not want to go to prison again. However, she feels sympathetic, puts the gun down, and returns their belongings. Jonna calls the police and Clara awaits her fate, but Jonna tells her to leave and the two exchange smiles. Paramedics arrive and Jonna returns Bree's engagement ring, which Clara had taken. When Bree asks how she got it back, Jonna replies, "We killed the monster", echoing what Bree said about killing their father, and implying that the monster that was inside Clara died when Jonna showed her sympathy and forgiveness.

== Cast ==
- Alexandra Park as Jonna
- Nora-Jane Noone as Bree
- Tobin Bell as McGradey
- Diane Farr as Clara

== Reception ==
12 Feet Deep received generally positive reviews from critics. JoBlo.com called it a "well crafted-entertaining thriller" and gave it 8/10 stars. That Moment In gave it 3.5/5 stars and said it was "well-directed and engrossing... less a shocker than an intense human drama".

== See also ==
- List of films featuring diabetes
- Stuck (2007 film)
