= Matt Eskandari =

American film director

- Born: Iran
- Education: University of Southern California
- Occupations: Film director, screenwriter,
- Years active: 2008–present
- Notable work: 12 Feet Deep, Victim, Trauma Center, Survive the Night, Hard Kill, Wire Room

Matt Eskandari is an Iranian-born American film director and screenwriter. His films include Victim, The Gauntlet, and 12 Feet Deep. He was also a contestant on the Fox Studios and Steven Spielberg filmmaker competition On the Lot.

== Career ==
Matt Eskandari attended film school at the University of Southern California. His thesis film, "The Taking", won the award for Best Student Film at Screamfest. Following film school, Eskandari was selected as a contestant for the Steven Spielberg filmmaker competition On The Lot. He would go on to make his feature debut a year later with the independent film Victim released by IFC Films, starring Stacey Haiduk, and premiered at the Cannes Film Festival. The film received a theatrical release, and was distributed on IFC Midnight's Pay-per-view channel.

In 2013, Eskandari directed and produced his film titled The Gauntlet which starred Bai Ling, and Dustin Nguyen. It debuted that October at the Screamfest film festival. Filmed in Beijing, China, the movie "follows five strangers who awake in an underground, medieval dungeon." The film received distribution from Lionsgate Home Entertainment following a screening at Cannes and was retitled Game of Assassins. For the film, Eskandari received several accolades, including the Best Director award from the Asians On Film Festival and the Winter Film Award for Best Feature Film. The official release on DVD and digital VOD was September 23, 2014.

In 2016, Eskandari began filming a new film he co-wrote entitled The Deep End. The film's cast included Tobin Bell, Nora-Jane Noone, and Alexandra Park. It was re-titled to 12 Feet Deep and released wide on June 20, 2017 by Mar Vista Entertainment.

== Filmography ==
- The Taking (short film) (2004)
- Retribution (short film) (2008)
- Victim (2010)
- Game of Assassins (2013)
- 12 Feet Deep (2017)
- Trauma Center (2019)
- Survive the Night (2020)
- Hard Kill (2020)
- Wire Room (2022)
