= Yorme: The Isko Domagoso Story =

- Theatrical release poster
- Directed by: Joven Tan
- Based on: Life of Isko Moreno
- Starring: Isko Moreno; Raikko Mateo; McCoy de Leon; Xian Lim
- Production company: Saranggola Media Productions
- Distributed by: Viva Films
- Release date: January 21, 2022
- Running time: 99 minutes
- Country: Philippines
- Language: Filipino

Yorme: The Isko Domagoso Story is a 2022 Filipino musical biographical film directed by Joven Tan, starring Isko Moreno, Raikko Mateo, McCoy de Leon, and Xian Lim.

== Synopsis ==
The film depicts Isko Moreno Domagoso's story in different times of his life and revolves around his chronicle of rising from "nobody", a lowly basurero, into "somebody" through hard work, perseverance, and "aiming for the stars".

== Cast ==
- Isko Moreno as himself / narrator
  - Raikko Mateo as young Scott / Isko / Yorme
  - McCoy de Leon as young adult Scott / Isko / Yorme
  - Xian Lim as Francisco "Scott / Isko / Yorme" Moreno Domagoso
- Jestoni Alarcon as Wowie Roxas
- Tina Paner as Rosario Moreno
- Ramon Christopher as Joaquin Copias Domagoso
- Janno Gibbs as German Moreno
- Mary Jean Lastimosa as Diana Ditan-Domagoso
- Bryle Mondejar as Rick Copias Domagoso
- Jojo Abellana as Georgina Roxas
- Jennifer Mendoza as Justin Rosanna
- Jovit Moya as Renato Ramos, Jr.
- Manolet Rippol as Earl Gatdula
- Eian Rances as Jojo Alejar
- Lovely Rivero as Shermaine Santiago
- Keempee de Leon as John Nite
- Ricky Rivero as Emil Paden
- Karen Timbol as Shermaine Santos
- Jeffrey Santos as Lance Gutierrez
- Maricar de Mesa as Shirley Fuentes

== Production ==
According to director Joven Tan, the project was conceptualized before the COVID-19 pandemic and two years before Moreno announced his intention to run for presidency. Shootings were also hampered due to health protocol restrictions. Shooting began in early 2021 after the government eased its restrictions. Tan confirmed that Moreno was not a producer of the movie. Moreno also did not receive payment from the rights of the film and instead requested the producers to donate his fees to a charitable institution in Manila.

== Release ==
The film was originally intended to theatrical premiere in the Philippines on December 1, 2021, to beat the deadline on election ban and then later moved to January 26, 2022. However, due to a spike in the number of COVID-19 Omicron variant cases, the film skipped theatrical release and released on digital and streaming premiere worldwide on January 21, 2022, via KTX.ph, Upstream PH, iWantTFC, TFC IPTV and Vivamax (through Vivamax Plus).
