= Otlum =

2018 Philippine horror film

- Theatrical release poster
- Directed by: Joven Tan
- Written by: Joven Tan
- Produced by: Joven Tan
- Starring: Buboy Villar; Jerome Ponce; Ricci Rivero; Vitto Marquez; Danzel Fernandez
- Cinematography: Jun Dalawis; Tejay Gonzales
- Edited by: Jason Cahapay
- Production company: Horseshoe Studios
- Distributed by: Horseshoe Studios
- Release date: December 25, 2018
- Country: Philippines
- Language: Filipino

Otlum is a 2018 Philippine horror film starring Buboy Villar, Jerome Ponce, Ricci Rivero, Vitto Marquez and Danzel Fernandez, directed and written by Joven Tan. It is one of the official entries of the 2018 Metro Manila Film Festival.

The term "Otlum" is "Multo" spelled backward, which means "Ghost".

== Story ==
The film is about a group of teenagers being haunted by a ghost who committed suicide in a haunted orphanage.

== Cast ==
- Buboy Villar as Fred
- Jerome Ponce as Allan
- Ricci Rivero as Dindo
- Vitto Marquez as Erwin
- Danzel Fernandez as Caloy
- Kiray Celis as Jessa
- Michelle Vito as Verna
- John Estrada as Bien
- Irma Adlawan as Aling Gemma
- Pen Medina as Father Resty
- Alfonso Yñigo Delen as young ghost
- Jairus Aquino as Buloy
- Vivoree Esclito as Girl Recruit
- Ping Medina as young Father Resty

== Production ==
The film was directed and written by Joven Tan and it was produced by Horseshoe Studios. Tan described Otlum as being similar to films of the Shake, Rattle and Roll franchise, which the director said he enjoyed watching growing up.

== Release ==
Otlum was released in cinemas in the Philippines on December 25, 2018, as part of the 2018 Metro Manila Film Festival. The film marks as Joven Tan's directorial debut in the film festival, as well as the film acting debut of Ricci Rivero, who was more noted for being a basketball player. Otlum's selection as among the eight entries was met with some controversy after the MMFF executive committee chose the film over Alpha: The Right To Kill. In response to the controversy, co-lead Rivero dismissed criticism on the film's selection remarking that he could not "control others' opinions".
