= Alone Together (2022 film) =

2022 film by Katie Holmes

- Poster
- Directed by: Katie Holmes
- Written by: Katie Holmes
- Produced by: Katie Holmes; Jordan Beckerman; Jordan Yale Levine; Shaun Sanghani
- Starring: Katie Holmes; Jim Sturgess; Derek Luke; Melissa Leo; Zosia Mamet; Becky Ann Baker
- Cinematography: Martim Vian
- Edited by: Sandra Adair
- Music by: Graham Reynolds
- Production companies: Yale Productions; Lafayette Pictures; SSS Entertainment; LB Entertainment; The Forest Road Company
- Distributed by: Vertical Entertainment
- Release dates: July 14, 2022 (Tribeca Film Festival); July 22, 2022 (United States)
- Running time: 93 minutes
- Country: United States
- Language: English

Alone Together is a 2022 American romantic drama film written and directed by Katie Holmes. The film stars Holmes, Jim Sturgess, Derek Luke, Melissa Leo, Zosia Mamet, and Becky Ann Baker. It premiered at the Tribeca Film Festival on July 14, 2022 and was released in the United States on July 22, 2022, by Vertical Entertainment.

== Synopsis ==
The film centers around two strangers who are sharing an Airbnb in New York state during the COVID-19 lockdown.

== Cast ==
- Katie Holmes as June
- Jim Sturgess as Charlie
- Derek Luke as John
- Melissa Leo as Deborah
- Zosia Mamet as Margaret
- Becky Ann Baker as Jan

== Production ==
Katie Holmes wrote the film at the very beginning of lockdown in 2020. Alone Together, produced by her new production company called Lafayette Pictures, was her second film as director. She produced the film with Jordan Yale Levine, Jordan Beckerman and Jesse Korman of Yale Productions, and Shaun Sanghani, owner of SSS Entertainment.

== Release ==
The film had its world premiere at the Tribeca Film Festival on July 14, 2022. Vertical Entertainment acquired North American distribution rights. The film was theatrically released on July 22, 2022 and was released on video on demand on July 29, 2022.

== Reception ==
Review aggregator Rotten Tomatoes reports that 28% of 36 critics gave the film a positive review. The site's critics consensus reads: "Director Katie Holmes takes an appealingly low-key approach to her story, but it isn't enough to offset Alone Together's bland characters and overall predictability."
