= Fernando Suarez =

Filipino Catholic priest (1967–2020)

The Reverend Father Fernando Suarez
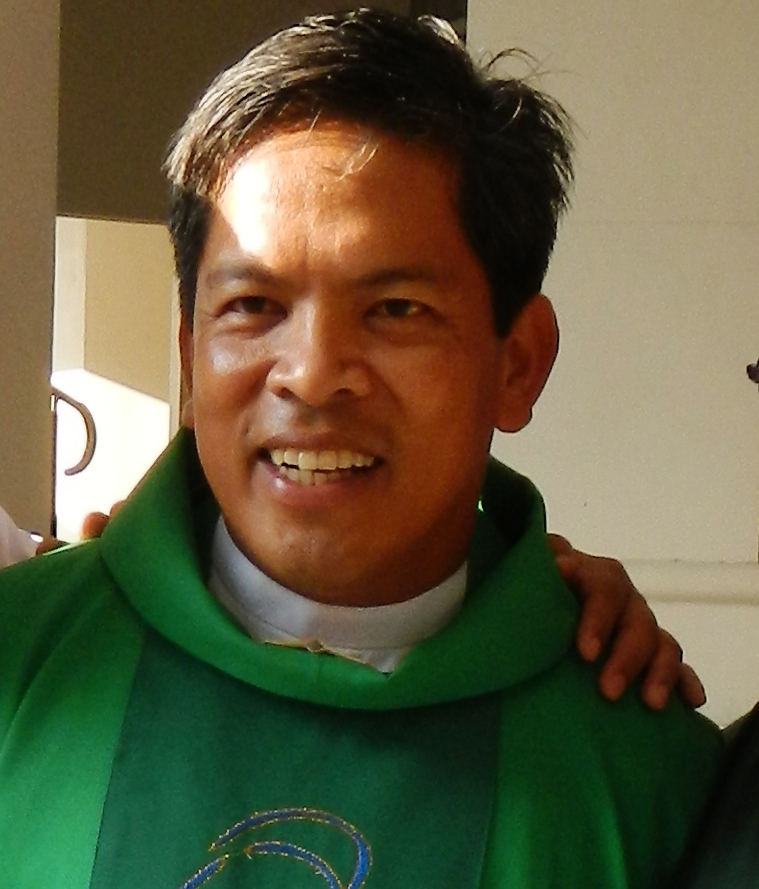
- Suarez in 2014
- Church: Latin Church

Orders
- Ordination: 2002

Personal details
- Born: 7 February 1967 Taal, Batangas, Philippines
- Died: 4 February 2020 (aged 52) Alabang, Muntinlupa, Philippines
- Denomination: Catholic
- Occupation: Faith healer
- Education: Adamson University

Fernando Suarez (7 February 1967 – 4 February 2020) was a Filipino Catholic priest who performed faith healing in the Philippines and abroad. He grew up in the Philippines and spent much of his life working in the Philippines. In 1995, Suarez travelled to Winnipeg, Canada, to pursue his calling to become a priest.

Suarez was ordained to the priesthood in 2002 and began to focus on faith healing. In July 2003 he was assigned to begin a ministry of healing. and he established the Mother Mary of the Poor Healing Ministry with the mission and intent "to seek holiness in evangelizing and working with the poor through the intercession of the Blessed Virgin Mary."

== Early life ==
Fernando Suarez was born in Barrio Butong in Taal, Batangas, Philippines on 7 February 1967. His father, Cervando, was a tricycle driver and his mother, Azucena, was a seamstress. He was the oldest of four siblings and attended public school. At the age of 12, he worked by renting inflatables (salbabida) at Butong Beach.

He attended Adamson University and earned a Chemical Engineering degree. After college, he briefly entered Christ the King Seminary, leaving after six months after being absent without leave.

In 1986, at the age of 18, he became aware of his healing gift. He prayed over a paralyzed 60-year-old beggar woman who he found outside Quiapo Church; according to Suarez, the woman was able to walk again after his prayers.

In 1995, he met French-Canadian student Mark Morin, who invited him to Canada and paid for his fare. They intended to enter into a business partnership but Suarez later decided to enter the priesthood. In 1997 he joined the Companions of the Cross, a newly established community of priests and seminarians in Ottawa. He was ordained in 2002 at age 35. He left the Companions of the Cross in 2011.

In Canada, when Suarez was still a seminarian, a Canadian woman declared dead eight hours earlier also opened her eyes after he prayed over her. From there his healing ministry continued and in 2008, he returned to the Philippines to resume his healing work.

== Healing ministry ==
In 1997 he joined the Companions of the Cross religious community of priests and seminarians in Ottawa, Canada. Suarez was ordained to the priesthood in 2002. Since his ordination to the priesthood, Suarez has found that the gift of healing became more pronounced in him. In July 2003 he was assigned to begin a ministry of healing. He established Mother Mary of the Poor Healing Ministry with the mission and intent "to seek holiness in evangelizing and working with the poor through the intercession of the Blessed Virgin Mary." He spent the first year of his priesthood as the associate pastor of St. Timothy's parish in North York, Ontario, however, since July 2003, in order to foster the spiritual gifts God has given him, he was assigned to begin a ministry of healing. He was regularly conducting Healing Masses, retreats and missions, with large numbers of people now in attendance.

On 11 January 2008, Manila Cardinal Archbishop Gaudencio Rosales officiated for Suarez's celebration of the Mass which started the three-day, 40-hour vigil at Suarez' Batangas City Montemaria mega-shrine. Hundreds of devotees and the sick gathered.

On 26 January 2008, two died and seven were rushed to James Gordon Hospital due to exhaustion, Olongapo City while waiting for Suarez' healing Mass. Juanito Eleazar, 69, died of a heart attack amid more than 15,000 worshippers having lined up. Also in 2008 Suarez was banned by Archbishop Oscar Cruz and Bishop Jose Oliveros from their diocese citing the Catholic Church's Congregation of the Doctrine of the Faith, which requires a local bishop's permission for church-related activities conducted by those who do not belong to the diocese.

Suarez announced his return to and resumption of his healing in the Philippines in May 2008

He left the Companions of the Cross in 2011.

In 2015, he appeared on The Bottomline with Boy Abunda and shared his encounter with Pope Francis and Suarez said that Pope Francis is human, yet he is a man of God. He said he concelebrated mass with Pope Francis at the Sta. Marta Chapel in Vatican in the previous year. Suarez also said that on that occasion, they exchanged skull caps, and that the Pope told him to continue his mission.

On 19 January 2020, Suarez gave a public interview with the Philippine Daily Inquirer, regarding his exoneration from alleged activities of monetary corruption, sexual molestation, and the merchandising of religious articles for profit from the Holy Office which he cited ruling in his favor on 6 January 2020. During his interview, Suarez claimed he was deprived of due process within the structure of the Catholic Church in the Philippines, prompting him to take his case directly to the Vatican for a permanent resolution. He further questioned the motives of some select bishops within the Catholic Church in the Philippines, which he viewed as consistently persecuting both his name and reputation on social media, pertaining to his healing ministry and global outreach outside of the Philippines. He also declared that his local ordinary bishop gave him authorization to conduct his ministry of healing, formerly sanctioned by Cardinal Ricardo Vidal.

== Death ==
Suarez died aged 52 of a heart attack on 4 February 2020 while playing tennis at the Ayala Alabang Clubhouse.
