= Elias Axume =

- Born: May 27, 1970 (age 56); San Antonio Pajonal, Santa Ana Department, El Salvador
- Occupations: Film producer, distribution executive
- Organization: Premiere Entertainment Group
- Title: President and CEO
- Spouse: Sandra Axume
- Children: 4

Elías Axume is a Salvadoran-American film producer and distribution executive. He is the founder, president and CEO of Premiere Entertainment Group, established in 2012.

He previously held executive positions at Maya Entertainment, Myriad Pictures, Mobius Films International and Franchise Pictures.

== Early life and education ==
Axume was born on May 27, 1970, in San Antonio Pajonal, Santa Ana Department, El Salvador. He spent part of his childhood there before emigrating to Los Angeles in February 1982, at the age of 11, where he reunited with his parents, who had previously left El Salvador during the country's civil war.

Axume has traced his interest in filmmaking to a childhood visit to the cinema in 1977, when his father took him to see a Bruce Lee film at the Cine Colón in Santa Ana. He attended California State University, where he studied film production and screenwriting.

== Career ==
Axume began working in post-production in 2006 before moving into film distribution . He served as vice president of post-production and distribution services at Mobius Films International and Franchise Pictures. He later joined Myriad Pictures, where he became executive vice president and oversaw worldwide sales, distribution and acquisitions.

In August 2010, Axume was appointed executive vice president of international distribution at Maya Entertainment. In the position, he was responsible for international sales and distribution and the development of the company's international sales and distribution division. The following year, Axume was promoted to head of international distribution at Maya Entertainment. He was tasked with overseeing a multi-million-dollar acquisition fund and continued to report to the company's chairman and CEO, Moctesuma Esparza.

In July 2012, Axume founded Premiere Entertainment Group (PEG), initially focusing on film distribution before the company began producing films in 2013, with The Outsider, starring James Caan, among its first productions. Axume serves as the company's president and CEO. PEG's sales slate has included Winnie-the-Pooh: Blood and Honey, Winnie-the-Pooh: Blood and Honey 2, Bambi: The Reckoning and Peter Pan's Neverland Nightmare.

In 2019, Axume was a producer of the action thriller Seized, directed by Isaac Florentine and starring Scott Adkins and Mario Van Peebles. Premiere Entertainment Group handled worldwide sales for the film.

In 2020, Axume was announced as a producer on the action crime film The Commando, directed by Asif Akbar and starring Michael Jai White and Mickey Rourke. Through Premiere Entertainment Group, he also handled worldwide sales for the film. The film was a co-production between Premiere Entertainment Group, Al Bravo Films, Little Nalu Pictures and Avail Entertainment.

In 2021, Axume was a producer on crime thriller Locked In starring Mena Suvari. He was also producer on Blindsided (also known as Night of the Sicario) starring Natasha Henstridge.

In 2022, Axume was announced as one of the producers of three films set in El Salvador: Fireflies at El Mozote, Toque de Queda and The Incredible Journey of Elba. Fireflies at El Mozote, set during the Salvadoran Civil War, was developed as a co-production between Premiere and Yari Film Group, with Bob Yari serving as executive producer. The film was written and directed by Ernesto Melara. Toque de Queda and The Incredible Journey of Elba were both announced with Arturo Menendez as director.

In the same year, he was a producer on American action thriller Black Warrant film directed by Tibor Takács and starring Tom Berenger and Cam Gigandet. The film was among three Premiere Entertainment productions, alongside Shrapnel and Blowback, included in a multi-picture distribution deal with Saban Films covering North America and selected international territories.

In 2023, Axume produced the body-swap comedy The Ballad of Hortensia, directed by Arturo Menendez and starring Julio Yudice, Francisco Gattorno and Helena Haro. The film was produced by Premiere Entertainment and filmed in El Salvador, with Carlos Rincon and Lizzy Gonzalez serving as executive producers. In the same year, Axume was a producer of the action thriller Ruthless, directed by Art Camacho and starring Dermot Mulroney and Jeff Fahey. He produced the film alongside Al Bravo, HemDee Kiwanuka and Camacho. He was also the producer of thriller Due Justice directed by Javier Reyna starring Kellan Lutz.

In September 2025, Axume produced the action thriller The Hook, starring Michael Jai White and Malin Akerman, alongside Al Bravo and Mike Pizzimenti. PEG handled worldwide sales for the film. During the 2025 Toronto International Film Festival, Axume closed a North American distribution deal for the film with ITN. That same month, Axume also produced the horror film Chupacabras, directed by Ricardo B'atz and starring Natalie Burn. The film was shot in Guatemala, with PEG handling worldwide sales. Ahead of production, the company secured distribution agreements for the film in North America, Italy and Latin America.

In 2026, Axume produced the post-apocalyptic thriller Dustlands, starring Ruby Rose, Chad Michael Collins and Terrence Howard, alongside Bravo and Pizzimenti.

== Filmography ==
Year	Title	Role
2014	The Silent Mountain	Executive producer
2014	Swelter	Co-executive producer
2014	The Outsider	Executive producer
2015	Abandoned	Co-executive producer
2015	The Night Crew	Co-producer
2015	AWOL-72	Executive producer
2016	Code of Honor	Co-producer
2017	Your Move	Executive producer
2018	Incoming	Producer
2019	Viking Blood	Executive producer
2020	Unfollower	Executive producer
2020	Seized	Producer
2020	Legacy	Producer
2020	The Legion	Executive producer
2021	Locked In	Producer
2021	Blindsided	Producer
2022	Black Warrant	Producer
2022	Project Legion	Executive producer
2022	Blowback	Producer
2022	The Commando	Producer
2023	Ruthless	Producer
2023	Due Justice	Producer
2023	MR-9	Executive producer
2023	Shrapnel	Producer
2023	Nevada Heist	Producer
2024	The Ballad of Hortensia	Producer
2024	Outbreak	Executive producer
2025	The Wrecker	Executive producer
2025	The Last Tenant	Executive producer
2025	F Plus	Executive producer
2025	Desert Dawn	Producer
2026	Man of War	Executive producer
2026	Fireflies at El Mozote	Producer

== Personal life ==
Axume is married to Sandra Axume, who is also Salvadoran. They have four daughters.
