= Scott Perlman =

Scott Perlman may refer to:

- Scott Perlman (baseball)
- Scott Perlman (filmmaker)
