= Into the Deep (2025 film) =

- Theatrical release poster
- Directed by: Christian Sesma
- Screenplay by: Chad Law; Josh Ridgway
- Produced by: Daemon Hillin
- Starring: Callum McGowan; Scout Taylor-Compton; Jon Seda; Stuart Townsend; Richard Dreyfuss
- Cinematography: Niccolo De La Fere
- Edited by: Eric Potter
- Music by: Andy Fosberry
- Production companies: Hillin Entertainment; Ashland Hill Media Finance; Film Bridge International; Mirror Productions; The Video Store
- Distributed by: Saban Films
- Release date: January 24, 2025
- Running time: 90 minutes
- Country: United States
- Language: English
- Box office: $87,338

Into the Deep is a 2025 American action thriller film written by Chad Law and Josh Ridgway, directed by Christian Sesma and starring Richard Dreyfuss, Scout Taylor-Compton, Jon Seda and Stuart Townsend. The film received negative reviews from critics and grossed $51,955 at the box office.

== Plot summary ==
Cassidy, an oceanographer, haunted by her father's death by a shark, decides to confront that memory by embarking on a diving expedition for sunken treasure with her new husband, Gregg, in Thailand. Their boat, captained by Gregg's friend Daemon, also includes other divers, including a couple named Pierre and Itsara. Their trip takes a dangerous turn when modern-day pirates, led by the sociopathic Jordan, seize their boat, looking for a lost shipment of drugs. The pirates force the tourists to dive into shark-infested waters to retrieve the contraband. As the divers' struggle to survive, they encounter both the deadly sharks and the ruthless pirates. In a series of flashbacks, Richard Dreyfus plays Cassidy's grandfather, a marine biologist, who teaches her to master her nightmares and fears.

During the closing credits roll, Richard Dreyfuss gives a speech about shark conservation.

== Cast ==
- Callum McGowan as Gregg
- Scout Taylor-Compton as Cassidy
  - Quinn P. Hensley as Cassidy (9 years old)
  - Nina Padovan as Cassidy (16 years old)
- Jon Seda as Jordan Devane
- Stuart Townsend as Daemon Benz
- Richard Dreyfuss as Seamus
- AnnaMaria Demara as Nancy
- David Gray as Ed
- Lorena Sarria as Itsara
- Tofan Pirani as Apache (credited as "TJ(Tofan Pirani)")
- Ron Smoorenburg as Chucky
- Tom O’Connell as Chason
- Maverick Kang Jr. as Pierre (credited as "Maverick Kang")

== Release ==
The film was released on selected theaters, digital platforms and VOD on January 24, 2025.

== Reception ==
On the review aggregator website Rotten Tomatoes, 27% of 26 critics' reviews are positive, with an average rating of 4.2/10. The website's consensus reads: "Into the Deep drowns its few intriguing ideas in melodramatic acting and flimsy effects, resulting in a shallow, often laughable thriller."

Leslie Felperin of The Guardian awarded the film two stars out of five. Rich Cross of Starburst also awarded the film two stars out of five. Ben Gibbons of Screen Rant scored the film a 3 out of 10. Matt Donato of IGN scored the film a 4 out of 10.
