= Andover (film) =

- Directed by: Scott Perlman
- Starring: Jonathan Silverman; Jennifer Finnigan; Scout Taylor-Compton; Angela Kinsey; Richard Kind; Richard Portnow; Beth Grant; Steven Bauer; Bai Ling; Joel Michaely
- Cinematography: Massimiliano Trevis
- Music by: The Pouts
- Distributed by: Gravitas Ventures
- Release dates: September 2017 (Cinéfest Sudbury); July 17, 2018
- Running time: 91 minutes
- Country: United States
- Language: English

Andover is a 2017 American science fiction romantic comedy film written and directed by Scott Perlman and starring Jonathan Silverman, Jennifer Finnigan, and Scout Taylor-Compton. The film had a limited theatrical release on May 4 in Los Angeles, Phoenix, and Chicago and was released on Blu-ray, DVD, and video-on-demand in the United States on July 17, 2018.

== Plot ==
Genetics professor Adam Slope nervously proposes to carefree, glass blower/artist Dawn. After the two marry, they take out high life insurance policies on each other and live happily- until Dawn dies in a fire at her glass blowing studio. Overwhelmed by grief, Adam takes hairs from Dawn's hairbrush to clone her in his lab with the help of his overeager grad student, Emma. The clones have various problems, and Adam becomes obsessed with perfecting them and kills them off when they do not look and act exactly as the original Dawn did.

Meanwhile, a suspicious life insurance agent investigates Adam's home as he doesn't believe Dawn is really dead. He spies on Adam as he brings home multiple clones of Dawn, made confusing by the fact that the clones start as babies and rapidly age to adults over the course of 3–4 months. The faulty clones begin to drive Adam crazy as no matter who raises them- himself, Emma, and even Dawn's best friend- it's never "the right Dawn." Grad student Emma is also becoming frustrated as she has feelings for Adam and doesn't agree with his cloning obsession.

When a Dawn clone falls in love with her old high school boyfriend and refuses to leave him, Adam gives her a poison injection rather than a cure for her rapid aging. Emma turns on him, realizing his obsession is keeping them from helping others with his genetics research the way she had hoped. She tells him about her feelings and leaves, only to sneak back into the lab to clone an Adam that will love her back. She takes him to the orphanage where he grew up so that he will be the same, adopting him later and trying to initiate a relationship- which he doesn't reciprocate.

As more Dawn clones fail to be exact replicas of the original, Adam breaks down further as the insurance investigator cracks down. He goes to Adam's class and questions him, but Adam blows him off and says he doesn't care about the money. The investigator goes to Dawn's parents with his concerns, and Dawn's mom reveals she saw Dawn in the window after she died (believing it to be Dawn's ghost). He breaks into Adam's house and finds evidence of Dawn's multiple deaths. He confronts Adam, accusing him of faking Dawn's death for the insurance money and then really killing her after falling for his lab assistant. The insurance investigator says that he will approve the insurance money and not report him to the police for fraud and murder, as long as Adam gives the money to him as hush money. Adam gives him a poisoned drink, then clones him and calls the police to report a confused man wandering around, clearing himself of any wrongdoing.

Dawn's parents go to Adam to see if she is really alive and agree to help Adam raise the final clone the same way they raised the original Dawn. Because of this, Dawn is finally like her original self- but she isn't in love with Adam because he is no longer the same. He tells her about all of the clones to convince her of their love, but she rejects him and goes back to her parents. Finally accepting that he will never have his Dawn back, Adam gives up on his mission and moves on. He learns that Emma cloned him, and the two decide to introduce Clone Adam to Clone Dawn- who actually do fall in love. Adam gives the $1,000,000 life insurance money to Dawn's parents to help the clones move away so that they are never caught.

Adam and Emma get together and Clone Adam and Clone Dawn get married, each living happy lives.

== Cast ==
- Jonathan Silverman as Adam Slope
- Jennifer Finnigan as Dawn Slope
- Scout Taylor-Compton as Emma
- Richard Kind as Harold
- Beth Grant as Rebecca
- Richard Portnow as Shamus Trout
- Angela Kinsey as Helen
- Bai Ling as Professor Huan
- Steven Bauer as Father Gregory
- Thomas Q. Jones as Wyatt
- Scott Krinsky as Lester
- GeorgeAnne Carden as Molly

=== Casting ===
Shannon Makhanian was the casting director as well as one of the producers. She cast the movie Brick which was the directorial debut of Rian Johnson.

Jonathan Lipnicki from Jerry Maguire does a cameo as a college student.

Thomas Q. Jones the former running back from the Chicago Bears and Arizona Cardinals plays Dawn's ex-boyfriend Wyatt.

Jonathan Silverman and Jennifer Finnigan are married in real life.

== Production ==
Set in Andover, Massachusetts, Andover was filmed in Los Angeles. Andover was shot in three weeks for under $300,000 under the SAG ultra-low-budget agreement. Several scenes were shot at Mountain View Cemetery in Altadena, California.

== Release ==
Andover had its world premiere was at the 2017 Cinéfest Sudbury International Film Festival. The US premiere was at The Orlando Film Festival and went on to screen at a number of other film festivals including the New Jersey Film Festival and the Boston Science Fiction Film Festival where Jennifer Finnigan won the Best Actor Award.

=== Awards and nominations ===
- Best Feature Film (2017 Orlando Film Festival)
- Audience Choice Award (Orlando Film Festival)
- Best Actress Jennifer Finnigan (Orlando Film Festival)
- Best Actor Jennifer Finnigan (Boston Science Fiction Film Festival)
- Richard Kind and Beth Grant were nominated for best supporting actor and actress at the Orlando Film Festival
- Scott Perlman was nominated for best director and best screenplay at the Orlando Film Festival

== Reception ==
Andover had a limited theatrical release and received mixed reviews from critics. Ben Cahlamer from Electric Bento said "With Mr. Perlman’s deft hand and the child-like wonderment that is Jonathan Silverman in the lead, you can be assured that Andover is unlike any other romantic comedy you’ve seen. Its heart leaps off the screen and reminds us that it’s okay to love and let go over and over."

The Los Angeles Times said, "This choppy film, which is saddled with a subplot about a dogged insurance agent (Richard Portnow), becomes more mechanical than emotional, leapfrogging time, logic and process as it scrambles to its too clever-by-half conclusion."

== Home media ==
Gravitas Ventures released Andover on Blu-ray, DVD, and streaming in the US on July 17, 2018.

== Soundtrack ==
All the songs were performed by The Pouts featuring Nadia Lanfranconi.
