= Scout Taylor-Compton =

American actress (born 1989)

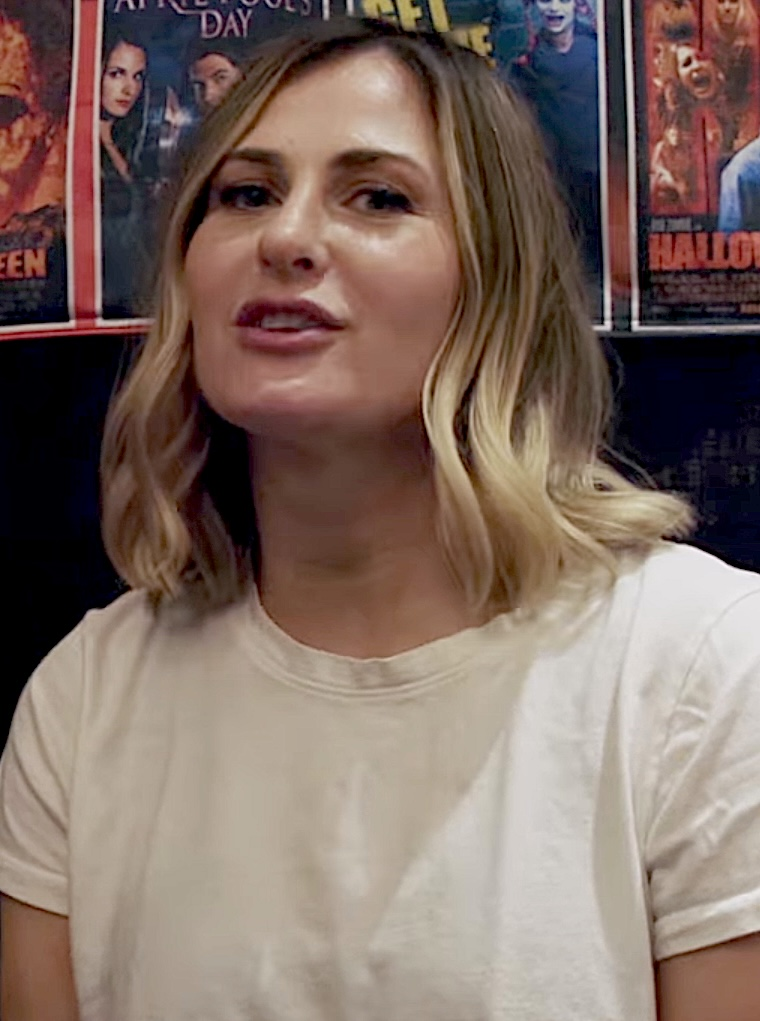
- Taylor-Compton at the 2025 Houston Horror Fest
- Born: Desariee Starr Compton; February 21, 1989 (age 37); Long Beach, California, U.S.
- Occupations: Actress; director; producer; screenwriter
- Years active: 1998–present
- Known for: Sleepover (2004); Halloween (2007); Halloween II (2009); The Runaways (2010)
- Spouse: Tom O'Connell (m. 2024)

Scout Taylor-Compton (born Desariee Starr Compton; February 21, 1989) is an American actress, film producer, director, and screenwriter. She began her career as a child actor, making her Hollywood film debut in 13 Going on 30 (2004) and having recurring roles on the WB television series Gilmore Girls (2001–2004) and Charmed (2003–2006). After supporting roles in the films Sleepover (2004) and An American Crime (2007), Taylor-Compton received mainstream recognition for her starring role as Laurie Strode in the horror films Halloween (2007) and Halloween II (2009).

Following Halloween, Taylor-Compton portrayed musician Lita Ford in the biographical film The Runaways (2010) and had supporting roles in the films Obsessed (2009), Love Ranch (2010), and Flight 7500 (2014), as well as a recurring role as Erin on season 4 of the ABC series Nashville (2015–2016). In the 2020s, she starred in the films The Long Night (2022) and Into the Deep (2025). She voiced Lady in Devil May Cry (2025).

Taylor-Compton made her feature directorial debut with the action thriller Bring the Law (2026). She subsequently co-wrote, co-directed, and co-starred in the horror film Last Chance Motel (2026) with Danielle Harris.

== Early life ==
Taylor-Compton was born Desariee Starr Compton, on February 21, 1989, in Long Beach, California to a Mexican mother and an American father who worked as a mortician. Taylor-Compton was raised in Apple Valley, California, and partly spent her childhood growing up in her father's funeral home. She has described herself as a "huge tomboy" in her early years: "I played baseball, and I was a swimmer. I did perform in plays. But I really got into acting when I was just eight years old."

== Career ==
=== 1998–2006: Early roles ===
In 1998, Taylor-Compton began her acting career with an appearance in the film A.W.O.L. with David Morse, and later in the short film Thursday Afternoon. She went on to have small roles in both television and film including Ally McBeal, ER, Frasier, The Guardian and The Division. She appeared in several student films, commercials for Fuji Film and the Disney Cruise Line, and various skits on The Jay Leno Show. In November 2000, Taylor-Compton made her stage debut as the title character in a production of Annie Warbucks at The Grove Theatre in Upland, California, and a stage production of Footloose at the Simi Valley Cultural Arts Center.

In 2001, she had a recurring role as Clara Forrester, the younger sister of Dean Forrester (Jared Padalecki) in the television series Gilmore Girls, appearing in a total of four episodes until 2004. Taylor-Compton was nominated for Best Performance in a Television Series – Recurring Young Actress for her portrayal of Clara at the 25th Young Artist Awards.

She made a comedic appearance in the film Four Fingers of the Dragon (2003) playing herself auditioning for a role in a fictional Kung Fu film. In 2004, she appeared in the teen comedy, Sleepover, her first large Hollywood film role. The cast of the film was nominated for Best Performance in a Feature Film – Young Ensemble Cast at the 26th Young Artist Awards. Following Sleepover, she appeared in numerous television series including Hidden Howie, Unfabulous (2 episodes), Cold Case, That's So Raven, Charmed (appearing in 8 episodes between 2000 and 2006 as various Fairies), and Without a Trace (in which she portrayed a runaway teenager).

=== 2007–2010: Halloween and breakthrough ===
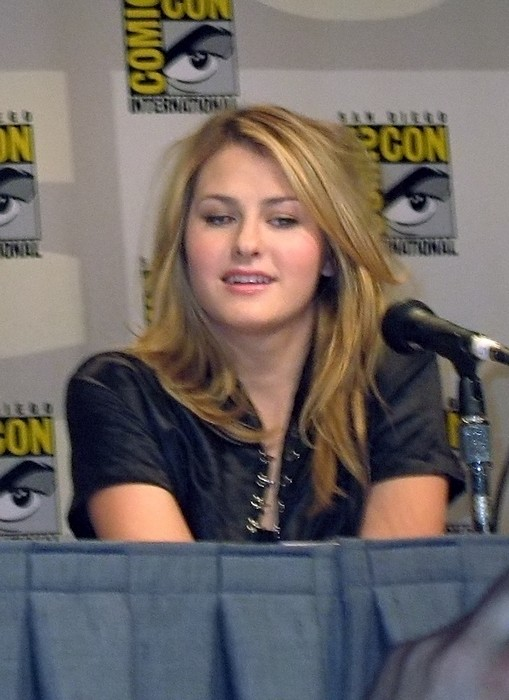
Taylor-Compton at the 2007 San Diego Comic-Con

In 2007, Taylor-Compton joined the cast of ABC's Friday Night Live. The same year, she starred in the drama Tomorrow is Today and the horror film Wicked Little Things. Tomorrow is Today features Taylor-Compton as Julie Peterson, a girl who saves the life of and befriends a hapless drifter. The film won over six awards at various festivals which included the California Independent Film Festival, the Garden State Film Festival, Method Fest Independent Film Festival, and the Rhode Island International Film Festival. She won "Best Actress" for her performance in the film at the Method Fest Independent Film Festival. Wicked Little Things was one of the films featured in After Dark's 8 Films to Die For and saw Taylor-Compton star as Sarah Tunny. Following these films, she appeared in Standoff and Close to Home.

In 2007, Taylor-Compton appeared in the biographical crime film An American Crime, which recounted the real-life murder of Sylvia Likens (portrayed by Elliot Page), a teenage girl who was kept a prisoner in the basement of an Indianapolis mother Gertrude Baniszewski (portrayed by Catherine Keener) and ultimately murdered in 1965.

Taylor-Compton returned to the horror genre as Laurie Strode in Rob Zombie's 2007 remake of the classic slasher film Halloween (1978). She endured a long audition process, but as director Zombie explains, "Scout was my first choice. There was just something about her; she had a genuine quality. She didn't seem actor-y."

She also starred in the television drama film Love's Unfolding Dream, which premiered on the Hallmark Channel on December 15, 2007, followed by the horror film April Fool's Day, a remake of the 1986 film, which was released directly to DVD in March 2008. She also made another horror film, the 2009 film Life Blood, in which she had a cameo as Carrie Lain.

However, in an interview conducted in July 2007, Taylor-Compton did report that after completing April Fool's Day she wanted to stay away from roles in the horror genre for her next film projects. Although she has received many horror film scripts, she believes that she "need[s] to move on from horror. Just drift away a little bit and do something else so I don't get stuck in that" and although she "love[s] doing horror films" and are her "favorite", she'd "like to do other stuff in between." She has recently been influenced by the career of Scarlett Johansson, wanting to choose scripts and roles based on personal interest as she views Johansson does. Taylor-Compton went on to explain, "That's what I kind of want to do. I love just being passionate about something rather than just caring about the money or who's in the movie." In 2009, Taylor-Compton starred alongside Helen Mirren and Joe Pesci in Love Ranch. The following year, she had a supporting role in the thriller Obsessed, starring Beyoncé Knowles, Ali Larter, and Idris Elba. The same year, Taylor-Compton reprised her role as Laurie Strode in Halloween II (2009), a sequel to Rob Zombie's 2007 film.

In 2010, she had a supporting role portraying guitarist Lita Ford in the biographical film The Runaways, opposite Kristen Stewart, Dakota Fanning and Stella Maeve.

=== 2011–present: Subsequent roles; directing ===
Taylor-Compton appeared in Takashi Shimizu's supernatural horror film Flight 7500 (2014), followed by a supporting role in the psychological thriller Return to Sender (2015) starring Rosamund Pike, Shiloh Fernandez, and Nick Nolte. Next, she co-starred opposite Jonathan Silverman and Jennifer Finnigan in the science fiction romantic comedy Andover (2017), portraying a graduate student working under a genetics professor who clones his deceased wife.

In 2021, Taylor-Compton starred in the thriller film An Intrusion, followed by the Western Apache Junction, for which she and co-star Stuart Townsend. Joe Leydon of Variety praised her and Townsend's performances, noting the two "are well-cast as archetypical Western characters while Trace Adkins again demonstrates commanding on-screen presence."

Taylor-Compton subsequently starred in the horror film The Long Night (2022) opposite Nolan Gerard Funk, Jeff Fahey, and Deborah Kara Unger. The same year, she appeared in the science fiction film Chariot, co-starring John Malkovich, Shane West, and Thomas Mann. She also appeared in the independent horror film Allegoria (2023), followed by a supporting role opposite Luke Wilson and Dolph Lundgren in the thriller The Best Man (2023).

On April 2, 2024, it was announced by Deadline Hollywood that Taylor-Compton's directorial debut Bring the Law had wrapped production, with its script written by Josh Ridgway from a story treatment by Daniel Figueirido. The film is produced by Daemon Hillin and Carolina Brasil, and its cast includes Mickey Rourke, Peter Facinelli, Nicky Wheelan, Brendan Fehr, Leah Pipes, and Taylor-Compton's Halloween co-star Danielle Harris. Also in 2024, Taylor-Compton starred opposite Taryn Manning and Kane Hodder in the horror film They Turned Us Into Killers.

In 2025, she starred opposite Richard Dreyfuss in the thriller Into the Deep, playing an oceanographer who becomes stranded in the ocean among sharks. The same year, Taylor-Compton made her directorial debut with the short film Building Blocks, which was screened at the Beverly Hills Film Festival. She also wrote and directed Road to Recovery in 2025, which was filmed in Tulsa, Oklahoma and inspired by her grief over her mother's death from cancer several years prior.

In 2026, Taylor-Compton directed her first feature film, the crime thriller Bring the Law, which stars Mickey Rourke, Peter Facinelli, and Leah Pipes. She subsequently co-wrote, co-directed, and co-starred in the horror film Last Chance Motel with Danielle Harris. The film, which also features Heather Langenkamp, is scheduled for digital release on October 6, 2026.

== Other ventures ==
In 2001, Taylor-Compton provided voice overs for I Am Sam, and continued with voice over work with appearances in The Core (2003) and The Princess Diaries 2: Royal Engagement (2004). The following year, she provided voice over work for the teen hero comedy Sky High. She sang the theme song "Jet Set" for the film Chicken Night (2001). In 2002, Taylor-Compton appeared briefly in the Will Smith music video for "Black Suits Comin' (Nod Ya Head)" for the Men in Black II soundtrack. She appeared in the music video for "Sweet Valentine" by the band Born the Sky in 2007.

In 2003, Taylor-Compton took vocal lessons with Diane Gillespie and Vocal Power Institute, along with guitar, drums and keyboard lessons, and joined a theatre group called "Shenanigans," where she performed and took weekly tap and jazz lessons. She attended the Hollywood Pop Academy for additional vocal training.

In 2007, Taylor-Compton released her debut rock/pop album, in which she sang and played drums. She has cited Cyndi Lauper, Gwen Stefani, Madonna, Kelly Osbourne and Green Day as her musical influences. She worked with ERA Productions and punk-pop singer Vitamin C. While on the set filming Halloween (2007), Taylor-Compton received "a few pointers" about a music career from director Rob Zombie, who had also fronted the band White Zombie. She has stated that singing is a side project and "is just a little talent that I have on the side, and if it does something then I'll do that, but I'm not gonna give up acting."

In 2011, she played in a music clip for a cover of Adele's song "Someone like You" by Tony Oller along with Lucas Till.

On October 31, 2021, Taylor-Compton and Danielle Harris launched a podcast called Talk Scary to Me, in which they discuss the horror industry alongside their personal lives. In 2023, the podcast was added to Bloody Disgusting's podcast network, Bloody FM.

In 2022, she appeared in metalcore band Ice Nine Kills' music video for their song "The Shower Scene", based on the 1960 film Psycho.

In 2023, she voiced Julie Crawford in the Texas Chain Saw Massacre video game, as well as performing motion capture for all female victims.

== Personal life ==
As a teenager, Taylor-Compton dated Andy Biersack from Black Veil Brides, who composed the song "The Mortician's Daughter" about her. In August 2005, when Taylor-Compton was sixteen years old, she was reported missing by her parents and was found approximately two weeks later at the home of a high school friend.

On May 5, 2024 she married actor Tom O'Connell, with whom she has been since 2020. She has attention deficit hyperactivity disorder.

== Filmography ==
=== Film ===
Year	Title	Role	Notes	Ref.
1998	Thursday Afternoon	Anna	Short film	
1998	6/29	Girl #2	Short film	
2001	Chicken Night	Penny	Short film	
2001	A Window That Opens	Katherine Jane	Short film	
2003	7 Songs	Molly		
2003	Four Fingers of the Dragon	Herself	Short film	
2003	Afterschool Delight	Scout	Short film	
2003	Audrey's Rain	Young Marguerite	Television film	
2004	13 Going on 30	Tiffany	Uncredited role	
2004	Sleepover	Farrah James		
2006	The Honeyfields	Mary Beth	Short film	
2006	Tomorrow Is Today	Julie Peterson		
2006	Wicked Little Things	Sarah Tunny		
2006	A.W.O.L	PTA Kid	Short film; uncredited role	
2007	An American Crime	Stephanie Baniszewski		
2007	Love's Unfolding Dream	Belinda Tyler	Television film	
2007	Halloween	Laurie Strode		
2008	April Fool's Day	Torrance Caldwell	Direct-to-video film	
2008	The Governor's Wife	Hayley Danville	Television film	
2009	Obsessed	Samantha		
2009	Smile Pretty	Nasty		
2009	Halloween II	Laurie Strode		
2009	Love at First Hiccup	Anya Benton		
2009	Life Blood	Carrie Lane	Direct-to-video film	
2010	The Runaways	Lita Ford		
2010	Love Ranch	Christina		
2010	Triple Dog	Liza Narn		
2011	247°F	Jenna		
2012	The Silent Thief	Elise Henderson		
2013	Wet and Reckless	Sonya 'Turbo'		
2014	Flight 7500	Jacinta Bloch		
2015	Tag	Rae		
2015	Return to Sender	Crystal		
2016	Cured	The Possessed	Short film	
2017	Get the Girl	Jade		
2017	After Party	Julia		
2017	Dirty Lies	Stacey		
2017	Ghost House	Julie		
2017	Andover	Emma Grady		
2017	Feral	Alice		
2018	Abducted	Detective Fini	Original title: Diverted Eden	
2018	Cynthia	Robin		
2018	Randy's Canvas	Cassie		
2019	The Lumber Baron	Mary Catherine Rimsdale		
2019	The Lurker	Taylor Wilson		
2019	Eternal Code	Charlie		
2020	Star Light	Bebe A. Love		
2020	Getaway	Maddy		
2020	Penance Lane	Sherry Roddick		
2020	Stay Home	Scout	Short film	
2021	Grey Café	Jean Grey	Short film	
2021	Blood Positive	Billie	Short film	
2021	Room 9	Star Bedford		
2021	An Intrusion	Detective Savannah Simpson		
2021	Apache Junction	Annabelle Angel		
2021	A Stalker in the House	Alexa		
2021	A Daughter’s Deceit	Cassie / Cat Quinn	Television film	
2022	The Long Night	Grace Covington		
2022	Chariot	Lauren Reitz / Oliver		
2022	Allegoria	Ivy		
2022	Triple Threat	Alex / Raina / Trinity	Television film	
2023	Topannah	Jesse		
2023	The Best Man	Hailey		
2023	Bury the Bride	June		
2023	Captive	Ashley		
2023	Edge of Insanity	Rylee Summers		
2023	A Creature Was Stirring	Liz		
2023	The Love Hunt	Meg	Television film	
2023	Hashtag Proposal	Millie	Television film	
2024	They Turned Us Into Killers	Star Bedford		
2024	Model House	Annie	Also executive producer	
2024	Ladybug	Wendy		
2024	Desert Fiends	Meg		
2025	Into the Deep	Cassidy Branham		
2025	Building Blocks	Patricia	Short film; also director and executive producer	
2025	Dead Giveaway	Vicky		
2026	Bring the Law	—N/a	Director	
2026	Last Chance Motel	Andi	Also co-director, co-writer, and co-producer	
2026	Cheer Bloody Murder	Kat		
TBA	Road to Recovery	—N/a	Director; also executive producer; Post-production	

=== Television ===
Year	Title	Role	Notes	Ref.
2000	Ally McBeal	Young Georgia	Episode: "Over the Rainbow"	
2000–2006	Charmed	Thistle / Fairy	Recurring role; 8 episodes (seasons 3, 5-8)	
2001	ER	Liz Woodman	Episode: "A Walk in the Woods"	
2001–2004	Gilmore Girls	Clara Forester	Recurring role; 4 episodes (seasons 1-3, 5)	
2003	Frasier	Gym Girl	Episode: "Trophy Girlfriend"	
2003	The Lyon's Den	Girl Fenderson	Episode: "Things She Said"	
2003–2004	The Guardian	Tiffany Skovich / Sharon Diamond	Episodes: "The Line" & "The Bachelor Party"	
2004	The Division	Katrina "Trina" Merril	Episode: "The Kids Are Alright"	
2004	Class Actions	Lydia Harrison	Unaired pilot	
2004–2005	Unfabulous	Molly	Episodes: "The Pink Guitar" & "The Partner"	
2005	Cold Case	Leah (1993)	Episode: "Wishing"	
2005	That's So Raven	Lauren Parker	Episode: "Goin' Hollywood"	
2006	Without a Trace	Emily Grant	Episode: "White Balance"	
2006	Standoff	Tina Bolt	Episode: "Peer Group"	
2007	Close to Home	Grace Hendricks	Episode: "Fall from Grace"	
2007	Bones	Celia Nash	Episode: "Soccer Mom in the Mini-Van"	
2010	CSI: Crime Scene Investigation	Renata Clarke	Episode: "Internatal Combustion"	
2010	NCIS: Los Angeles	Angela Rush	Episode: "Full Throttle"	
2010	Chase	Unnamed	Episode: "Havoc"	
2011	CSI: NY	Emmy Thomas	Episode: "Do or Die"	
2011	Breakout Kings	Starla Roland	Episode: "Fun with Chemistry"	
2011	Halloween Wars	Herself	Guest judge; Episode: "Underworld"	
2012	Grey's Anatomy	Angie	Episode: "If Only You Were Lonely"	
2014	Major Crimes	Becka Wilshaw	Episode: "Zoo Story"	
2015–2016	Nashville	Erin	Recurring role; 7 episodes (season 4)	
2016	Rosewood	Christa	Episodes: "Forward Motion & Frat Life" & "Spirochete & Santeria"	
2025–present	Devil May Cry	Lt. Mary Ann Arkham / "Lady"	Voice role; 15 episodes (two seasons)	
2025	S.W.A.T.	Chantel Rivers	Episode: "Ride or Die"	

=== Video games ===
Year	Title	Role	Notes	Ref.
2023	The Texas Chain Saw Massacre	Julie Crawford	Voice and motion-capture	

== Accolades ==
Award/association	Year	Category	Nominated work	Result	Ref.
C&I Movie and TV Awards	2022	Best Actress	Apache Junction	Nominated	
International Horror Hotel Film Festival	2025	Best Actress	Ladybug	Won	
LA Live Film Festival	2021	Best Actress	Blood Positive	Won	
Method Fest Independent Film Festival	2007	Best Actress	Tomorrow Is Today	Won	
Top Indie Film Awards	2020	Best Feature	Eternal Code	Nominated	
Young Artist Awards	2004	Best Performance in a Television Series – Recurring Young Actress	Gilmore Girls	Nominated	
Young Artist Awards	2005	Best Performance in a Television Series – Recurring Young Actress	The Guardian	Nominated	
Young Artist Awards	2005	Best Performance in a Feature Film - Young Ensemble Cast	Sleepover	Nominated	

== See also ==
- List of solved missing person cases (2000s)
