= Busingye Peninah Kabingani =

Ugandan politician

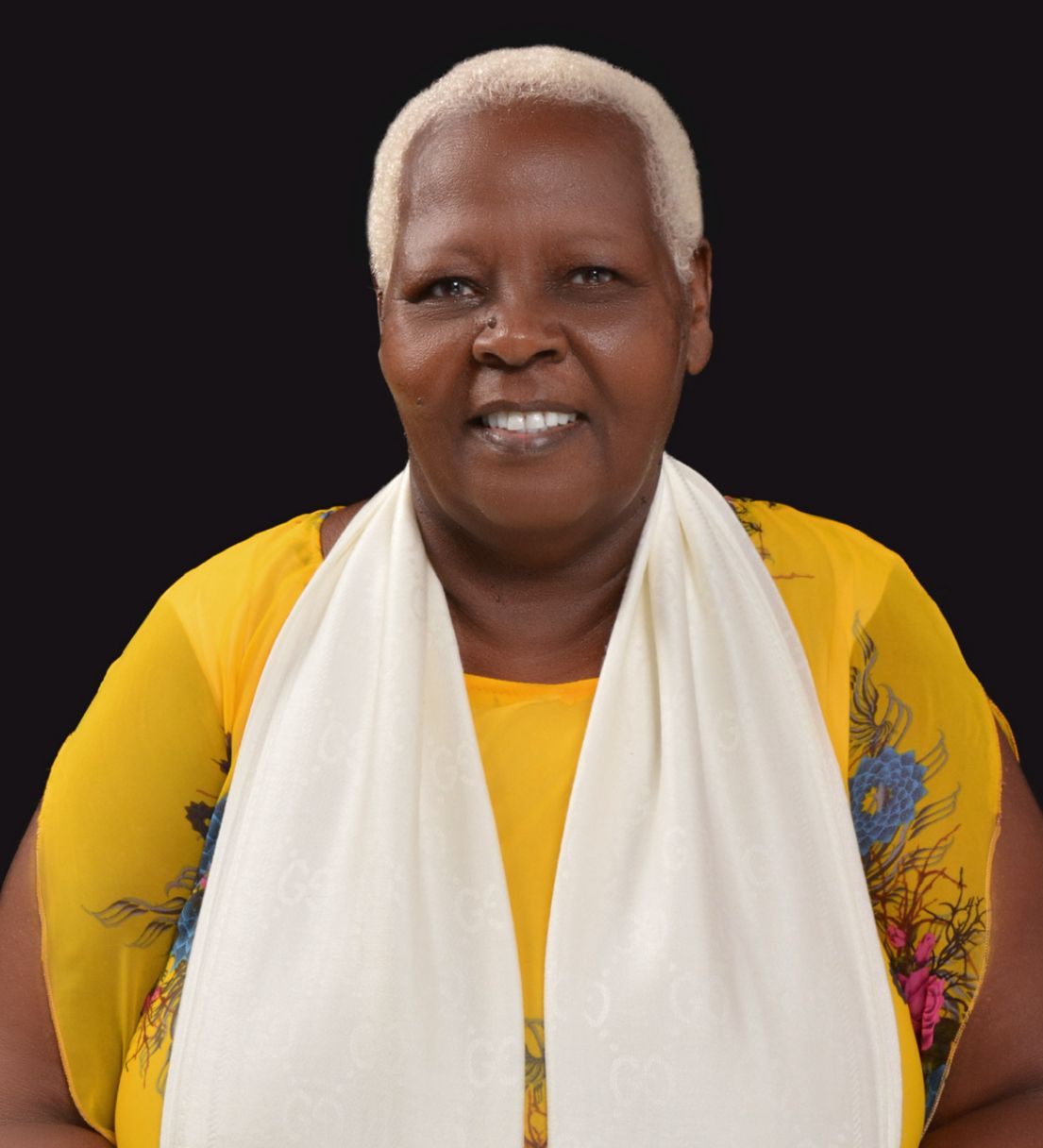
- Busingye Peninah Kabingani

Member of Parliament
- Incumbent
- Assumed office 2021
- Constituency: Elderly of Central Region

Personal details
- Born: 1943 (age 82–83) Kitojo Village, Buyanja, Rukungiri District, Uganda
- Party: National Resistance Movement (NRM)
- Occupation: Politician, Farmer, Retired Civil Servant
- Profession: Farmer, Civil Servant (retired)
- Nickname: Mama Kisanja

Busingye Peninah Kabingani (born 1943) is a Ugandan politician and legislator. She is a born of Kitojo Village, Buyanja sub county Rukungiri District and a daughter of Kezekiya Kabingani and Bomunyana Joviya. She represents the Elderly of Uganda's central region as MP in the parliament of Uganda. She is a chairperson Elderly League of CEC (Central Executive Committee) an arm of the ruling National Resistance Movement (NRM) on whose ticket she was voted into parliament in the 2021 Uganda general elections.

== Background ==
Busingye Peninah Kabingani, commonly known as Mama Kisanja, is a farmer, retired civil/public servant and a resident of Kira municipality in Wakiso district.

Kabingani won the seat for Elderly MP central region on the NRM ticket with 113 votes against her closest rival Halima Namakula who came second from the elders electoral college, composed of delegates of elders from 27 districts of the central region.

== Career ==
Kabingani is a farmer and retired civil servant who worked with East African railways that later morphed into Uganda railways after the disintegration of the first east African community.

She has been actively engaged in political mobilization for close to 58 year, she is also the treasurer of Wakiso district Elderly league.

She currently represents the Elderly of central region in the parliament of Uganda.

Busingye Peninah Kabingani has been dedicated to advancing sustainable development initiatives across Uganda, contributing to NRM Mobiliser in Wakiso and Mpigi districts at Uganda at large. Busingye Peninah Kabingani plan to bridge the gap between the central executive and the elderly persons not only in Buganda region but the entire country.

== Professional Experience ==
Parliament of Uganda | Kampala, Uganda

2021 – Present

- Legislation: debate and pass laws that guide the country’s development and governance.
- Representation, I act as a voice for my constituents in parliament by bringing their concerns and needs to the attention of government.
- Budgeting, I participate in the approval of the national budget and ensure that public funds are allocated and spent effectively.
- Oversight, I monitor government activities and programs like the Parish Development Model.
- Member of the Committee of Parliament on Presidential Affairs
- Member of the Committee of Parliament on Equal Opportunities

Chief Executive Officer J2E

Kampala, Uganda

2003 – Present

- Provide strategic leadership and overall management of the Company
- Oversee the company’s day to day operations.
- Communicate the company’s vision and strategy to employees, investors and public.
- Ensure the company operates ethically and legally.

Chairperson NRM Elderly League Wakiso District

2025-Present

- ·Mobilization of the Elderly to engage in Government Programs

NRM Chief Mobiliser: Mpigi District

1995 – 2020

- Strategic planning and development of grassroots support
- Fundraising and campaign management.
- Capacity Building; development of the party’s internal capacity for resource mobilization.
- Monitor and evaluation of NRM programs

Accountant

Grind Lays International Bank Uganda

1978-1979

- Interpretation of financial Statements.
- Reconciling bank statements
- Maintain books of accounts
- Offer financial advise to clients

Secretary

Uganda Railways Co-operation

1975-1977

- Appointment scheduling
- Record keeping.
- Administrative support
- Communication management.

Secretary/Store Keeper

East African Railways and Harbours | Mombasa, Kenya

1972 – 1975

- Appointment scheduling
- Record keeping.
- Administrative support
- Communication management.

== Education ==
Diploma in Gio Science

University of Norte-dame | Canada | 1972-1974

Bachelor of Arts in Social Sciences

Kiambu College | Nairobi, Kenya | 1970

Joint Examination for Higher Certificate and General certificate of Education

Private Center | Kampala Uganda | 1969
