= Black Warrant (film) =

- Release poster
- Directed by: Tibor Takács
- Written by: D. Glase Lomond; Joshua A. Cohen; Javier Reyna
- Story by: Michael Paré
- Produced by: Elias Axume, Eduard Osipov, Joshua A. Cohen
- Starring: Tom Berenger; Cam Gigandet
- Cinematography: Brandon Ruiz
- Distributed by: Saban Films
- Release date: December 9, 2022
- Country: United States
- Language: English

Black Warrant is a 2022 American action thriller film directed by Tibor Takács and starring Tom Berenger and Cam Gigandet.

The movie's plot focuses on a former special ops assassin, played by Tom Berenger, and a DEA agent, played by Cam Gigandet, who team up to stop Hussein Bin Fari, a notorious terrorist.

== Cast ==
- Tom Berenger as Nick
- Cam Gigandet as Anthony Vanowen
- Jeff Fahey as Frank Larusso
- Hani Al Naimi as Hussein Bin Farri
- Sara Seyed as Rashida Bin Farri
- Helena Haro as Mina
- Rafael Cabrera as Zico
- Joe Chacon as Juan
- Rodrigo Abed as Captain Escalante
- Carlos Aylagas as Fernando

== Production ==
As of November 2021, the film is in post-production.

== Release ==
In May 2022, it was announced that Saban Films acquired the rights to the film in North America, UK, Ireland, Spain, Australia, New Zealand, and South Africa. The film was released in select theaters, on Demand and on digital platforms on December 9, 2022.

== Reception ==
On the review aggregator website Rotten Tomatoes, 20% of 5 critics' reviews are positive, with an average rating of 3.4/10. Jeffrey Anderson of Common Sense Media awarded the film one star out of five.

Julian Roman of MovieWeb gave the film a positive review and wrote, "Black Warrant shouldn't be this funny and entertaining. The standard save the world plot relies on impossible coincidences to fuel a second act twist that's completely unbelievable. You'd think that would disqualify the film as being another forgettable actioner. Imagine my surprise to be actually smiling when the credits rolled. Likable primary characters and a stable of interesting goons kept my attention throughout."
