= Pups Alone =

- Theatrical release poster
- Directed by: Alex Merkin
- Written by: Brandon Burrows; Jason Gruich
- Produced by: Brandon Burrows; Courtney Lauren Penn
- Starring: Jerry O'Connell; Jennifer Love Hewitt; Rob Schneider; Dolph Lundgren; Danny Trejo; Malcolm McDowell
- Production companies: Boundless Pictures; Firebrand
- Distributed by: Saban Films
- Release date: November 19, 2021
- Running time: 107 minutes
- Country: United States
- Language: English

Pups Alone is a 2021 American Christmas slapstick comedy film written by Brandon Burrows and Jason Gruich, directed by Alex Merkin and starring Dolph Lundgren and featuring the voices of Jerry O'Connell, Jennifer Love Hewitt, Rob Schneider, Danny Trejo and Malcolm McDowell.

== Plot ==
Just before Christmas, Robert, a gifted inventor, and his daughter relocate to a new neighborhood. However, when Robert gets there, his cunning next-door neighbor Victor and his vicious dogs target him. Unaware that the neighborhood canines have banded together to thwart the would-be burglars, Victor hires two incompetent criminals to steal Robert's most recent innovation.

== Cast ==
- Dolph Lundgren as Victor
- Keith David as The Wise Bartender
- Nicholas Turturro as Benny
- Eric Roberts as CEO Bill
- Brandon Burrows as Officer Duewrong
- Tyler Hollinger as Robert
- Isadora Swann as Jenna

=== Voices ===
- Jennifer Love Hewitt as Gidget
- Rob Schneider as Jose
- Danny Trejo as Vinnie P
- Malcolm McDowell as Oliver
- Jerry O'Connell as Charlie

== Production ==
The production started filming in the summer 2017. In November 2020, it was announced that Hewitt, David and Roberts were cast in the film. In March 2021, it was announced that Schneider, Lundgren and Turturro were also cast in the film. Later that same month, it was announced that Trejo, McDowell and O'Connell were added to the cast.

== Release ==
The film was released in theaters on November 19, 2021. Then it was released on demand, digital and DVD on November 23, 2021.

== Reception ==
Tara McNamara of Common Sense Media awarded the film two stars out of five.
