= Chariot (film) =

- Directed by: Adam Sigal
- Written by: Adam Sigal
- Produced by: Johnny Remo; Henry Penzi; Sasha Yelaun
- Starring: Thomas Mann; Rosa Salazar; Shane West; Scout Taylor-Compton; John Malkovich
- Cinematography: Senda Bonnet
- Edited by: K. Spencer Jones
- Music by: Richard Patrick
- Production companies: Scarlett Pictures; Skipstone Pictures; Forest Road Company
- Distributed by: Saban Films
- Release date: April 15, 2022
- Running time: 94 minutes
- Country: United States
- Language: English

Chariot is a 2022 American science fiction comedy film written and directed by Adam Sigal. The film stars John Malkovich, Thomas Mann, Rosa Salazar, Shane West, Scout Taylor-Compton and Vernon Davis.

The film was released to theatres and video on demand on April 15, 2022, by Saban Films. It received negative reviews from critics.

== Plot ==
Harrison Hardy (Thomas Mann) is plagued by a recurring dream that he has experienced nearly 5,000 times. Seeking help, he consults the enigmatic Dr. Karn (John Malkovich), who specializes in reincarnation therapy. During his treatment, Harrison encounters Maria (Rosa Salazar), a woman from his past life, which disrupts the fragile balance of his current existence. As strange occurrences unfold in a peculiar building filled with eccentric residents, Harrison must navigate the complexities of his past and the implications of their reunion, leading to a surreal exploration of identity and fate.

== Cast ==
- John Malkovich as Dr. Karn
- Thomas Mann as Harrison Hardy
- Rosa Salazar as Maria Deschaines
- Shane West as Rory Calhoun
- Scout Taylor-Compton as Lauren Reitz / Oliver
- Vernon Davis as David Reece
- Chris Mullinax as Old Man
- Joseph Baena-Schwarzenegger as Cory

== Production ==
On January 26, 2021, filming began in Little Rock, Arkansas.

In February 2022, Saban Films acquired distribution rights to the film and the title is now called Chariot.

== Reception ==
On the review aggregator website Rotten Tomatoes, 17% of 18 critics' reviews are positive, with an average rating of 3.9/10. Metacritic, which uses a weighted average, assigned the film a score of 43 out of 100, based on 6 critics, indicating "mixed or average" reviews.

Odie Henderson of RogerEbert.com awarded the film one and a half stars and wrote, "...by making all the wondrous ideas surrounding his protagonist’s main story seem mundane, Sigal undermines his own universe."

Luke Y. Thompson of The A.V. Club graded the film a C− and wrote, "Ultimately, Chariot certainly doesn’t lack ambition, just execution."

Julian Roman of MovieWeb gave the film a negative review and wrote, "Chariot is a hollow and absurd exploration of the afterlife. What begins as an interesting metaphysical dilemma devolves into gimmicky theatrics that make no sense whatsoever."

Alexander Harrison of Screen Rant awarded the film two stars out of five and wrote, "Ultimately, what moments do flash in Chariot are not enough to overcome the feelings of confusion and aggravation its viewers are left with..."

Sumner Forbes of Film Threat rated the film a 7 out of 10 and wrote, "Chariot may not blow anyone away with its inventiveness, but it’s right at home in the family of darkly funny science fiction films that are enjoyable to watch late at night."
