= Jesse Harris (director) =

American film director

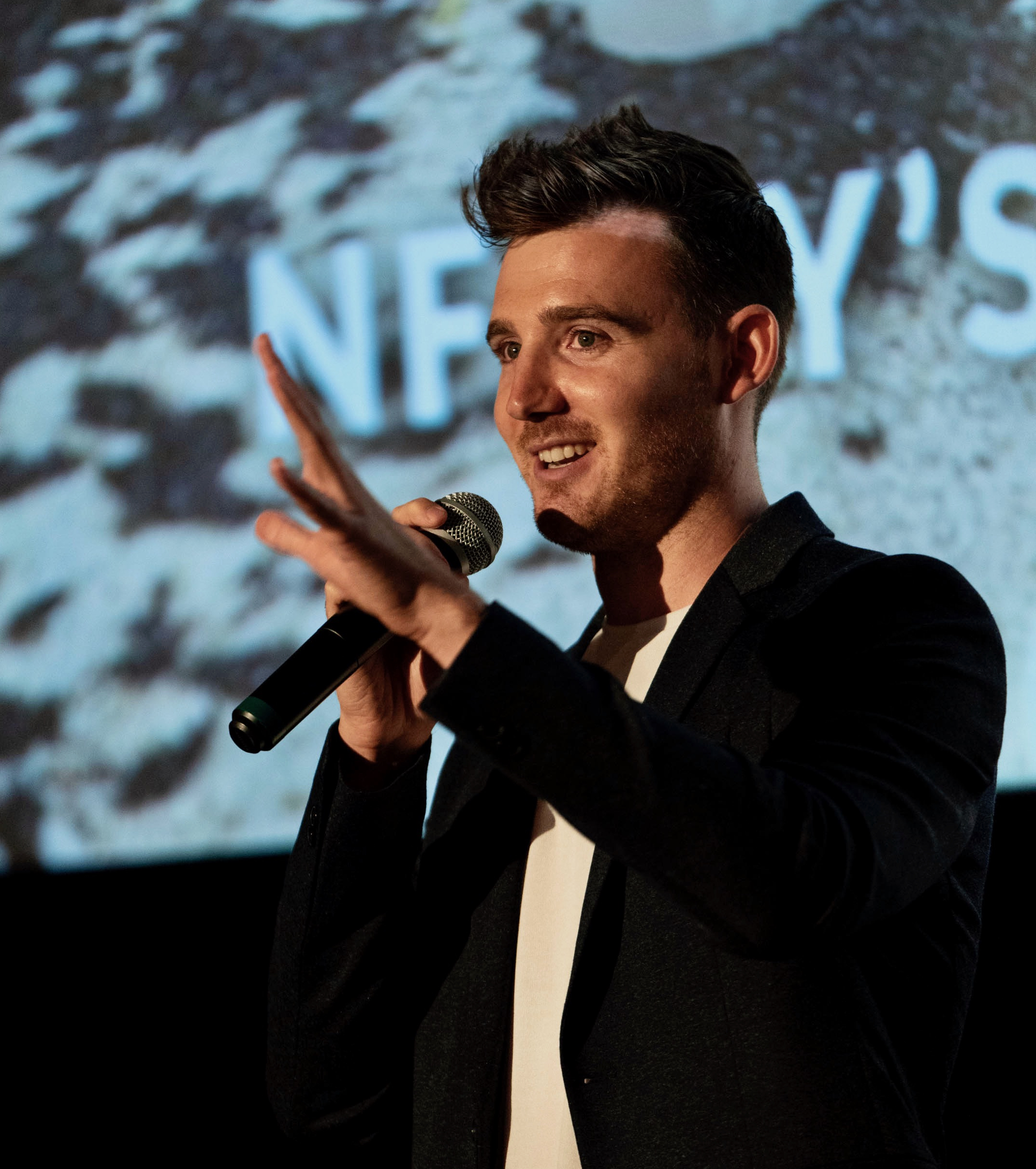

Jesse Harris (born December 8, 1985) is an American film director, screenwriter, and producer. He is the founder of the National Film Festival for Talented Youth (NFFTY). His film, Borrego (2022), released January 14, 2022 in theaters and digital in the US and came to Netflix on May 14, 2022.

== Early life and education ==
Harris was born and raised in Seattle, Washington. Beginning at age 8, Harris found his love for filmmaking and started making home movies.

When Harris was 17 years old, he convinced his parents that instead of going to college, he should make a feature film rather than film school. The film, LIVING LIFE was written, directed and produced by Harris in 2003 and was later picked up for distribution and released theatrically in 2005. The Seattle Times review of the film said Harris showed great promise and had talent to burn.

== Career ==
In 2007, after hearing from other aspiring filmmakers after the release of his first film, Harris founded NFFTY (National Film Festival for Talented Youth). The festival aimed to support up and coming filmmakers 24 years old and younger. Under Harris' leadership, the festival grew into the largest and most prestigious youth film festival in the world.

Harris began directing commercials and advertising in 2008. He was a runner up for the national Heinz Ketchup commercial contest. Harris' commercial work has been seen on TV around the world, working with clients such as Volvo, Microsoft, Coca-Cola, Disney, Samsung and more.

Wanting to return to making movies, in 2018 Harris wrote and directed the short film WIND IN THE NIGHT as a proof of concept for his next feature film. The film was one of seven films selected for the 2019 Prix SNCF du Polar in France, was Closing Night at Seattle International Film Festival ShortsFest and was picked up for distribution in France, Asia, UK and USA. IndieShorts Magazine called the film "An aesthetic victory, Jesse Harris' 'Wind in the Night' showcases its director's cinematic vision and expertise over his craft."

In 2020 Harris directed his 2nd feature film, BORREGO. He also wrote the screenplay and was a producer on the film, made under his production company, Abcde Pictures. The film was shot in Spain because of the pandemic. It stars Lucy Hale, Nicholas Gonzalez, Leynar Gomez, Jorge A. Jimenez and Olivia Trujillo. The US and Spanish rights were bought by Saban Films and released January 22, 2022. The film was the #3 Best Rated Film Release in January 2022 according to IMDb. Borrego came to Netflix in the US & Canada on May 14, 2022. The film quickly became the #3 Most Watched Movie the week it released.

== Recognition ==
In 2009, Variety named Jesse one of 25 talents who transformed youth entertainment, in their annual Youth Impact Report. [16] In 2014, Harris was named a Global Shaper, an initiative of the World Economic Forum, working with other young people around the world to better their communities.

== Filmography ==
Film

Year	Title	Director	Writer	Producer
2005	Living Life	Yes	Yes	Yes
2022	Borrego	Yes	Yes	Yes

Short film

Year	Title	Director	Writer	Producer
2018	Wind in the Night	Yes	Yes	Yes
