= Saban Films =

Filming division of Saban Capital Group

- Type: Division
- Industry: Film distribution
- Founded: 6 May 2014; 12 years ago
- Founder: Haim Saban
- Headquarters: Los Angeles, California, U.S.
- Area served: Worldwide
- Key people: Bill Bromiley (president)
- Products: Motion pictures
- Parent: Saban Capital Group
- Website: www.sabanfilms.com

Saban Films is the film distribution division of American investment company Saban Capital Group. Launched in 2014 by Haim Saban, who appointed RLJ Entertainment's Bill Bromiley as president, ahead of that year's Cannes Film Festival.

The company's highest grossing release is the horror film Buddy (2026).

== Filmography ==
- The Homesman (14 November 2014), co-distribution with Roadside Attractions
- Tracers (20 March 2015)
- The Forger (24 April 2015)
- American Heist (24 July 2015)
- Some Kind of Beautiful (21 August 2015)
- Man Up (13 November 2015)
- Spooks: The Greater Good (4 December 2015)
- Standoff (12 February 2016)
- Backtrack (26 February 2016)
- The Confirmation (18 March 2016)
- The Trust (14 April 2016)
- A Hologram for the King (22 April 2016), co-distribution with Lionsgate and Roadside Attractions
- I Am Wrath (16 May 2016)
- Cell (10 June 2016)
- Skiptrace (22 July 2016)
- 31 (16 September 2016)
- USS Indianapolis: Men of Courage (14 October 2016)
- Come and Find Me (11 November 2016)
- War on Everyone (3 February 2017)
- The Girl with All the Gifts (24 February 2017)
- Power Rangers (24 March 2017), only film to date to be released under the SCG Films banner alongside Lionsgate
- The Assignment (7 April 2017)
- The Hunter's Prayer (9 June 2017)
- Kill Switch (16 June 2017)
- The Last Face (29 June 2017)
- Shot Caller (18 August 2017)
- Gun Shy (8 September 2017)
- Blood Money (13 October 2017)
- Killing Gunther (20 October 2017)
- Acts of Vengeance (27 October 2017)
- 24 Hours to Live (1 December 2017)
- Bullet Head (8 December 2017), co-distribution with Lionsgate Films
- Hangman (22 December 2017), co-distribution with Lionsgate Films
- Day of the Dead: Bloodline (5 January 2018)
- Small Town Crime (19 January 2018), co-distribution with DirecTV Cinema
- Braven (2 February 2018)
- The Forgiven (9 March 2018)
- An Ordinary Man (13 April 2018)
- The Escape of Prisoner 614 (27 April 2018)
- Dark Crimes (11 May 2018)
- The Yellow Birds (15 June 2018)
- Black Water (19 June 2018)
- Siberia (13 July 2018)
- Occupation (20 July 2018)
- I Am Vengeance (4 August 2018)
- Mara (7 September 2018)
- Final Score (14 September 2018)
- Lizzie (14 September 2018), co-distribution with Roadside Attractions
- Viking Destiny (5 October 2018)
- The Super (19 October 2018)
- Speed Kills (16 November 2018), U.S. distribution
- All the Devil's Men (7 December 2018)
- Between Worlds (14 December 2018), U.S. distribution
- Keepers (4 January 2019)
- King of Thieves (25 January 2019)
- Berlin, I Love You (8 February 2019)
- Trading Paint (22 February 2019)
- Never Grow Old (15 March 2019)
- A Vigilante (29 March 2019)
- The Haunting of Sharon Tate (5 April 2019)
- Dead Trigger (3 May 2019)
- The Professor (17 May 2019), co-distribution with DirecTV Cinema
- Project Ithaca (7 June 2019)
- The Command 21 June 2019
- Bottom of the 9th (19 July 2019)
- Dead Water (26 July 2019)
- Light of My Life (9 August 2019)
- Tone-Deaf (23 August 2019)
- Night Hunter (6 September 2019)
- 3 from Hell (16 September 2019), co-distribution with Lionsgate and Shudder
- American Dreamer (20 September 2019)
- Rogue Warfare (4 October 2019)
- Jay and Silent Bob Reboot (15 October 2019)
- Danger Close: The Battle of Long Tan (8 November 2019)
- Line of Duty (15 November 2019)
- 3022 (22 November 2019)
- I See You (6 December 2019)
- The Great War (13 December 2019)
- Mob Town (13 December 2019)
- The Corrupted (10 January 2020)
- John Henry (24 January 2020)
- Come to Daddy (7 February 2020)
- The Night Clerk (21 February 2020)
- Guns Akimbo (28 February 2020)
- Ride Like a Girl (13 March 2020)
- Hooking Up (20 March 2020)
- Vivarium (27 March 2020)
- Rogue Warfare: The Hunt (3 April 2020)
- We Summon the Darkness (10 April 2020)
- The Legion (8 May 2020)
- Villain (22 May 2020)
- I Am Vengeance: Retaliation (19 June 2020)
- The Silencing (16 July 2020)
- Most Wanted (24 July 2020)
- Retaliation (24 July 2020)
- Calm with Horses (31 July 2020)
- The Vanished (21 August 2020)
- Rogue Warfare: Death of a Nation (25 September 2020)
- Death of Me (2 October 2020)
- Friendsgiving (23 October 2020)
- Mortal (6 November 2020)
- Echo Boomers (13 November 2020)
- Fatman (13 November 2020)
- Buddy Games (24 November 2020)
- Love, Weddings & Other Disasters (4 December 2020)
- Wander (4 December 2020)
- The Stand In (11 December 2020)
- Breach (18 December 2020)
- Sister of the Groom (18 December 2020)
- Redemption Day (8 January 2021)
- Don't Tell a Soul (15 January 2021)
- Wrong Turn (26 January 2021)
- Pixie (5 March 2021)
- Cosmic Sin (12 March 2021)
- City of Lies (19 March 2021)
- Happily (19 March 2021)
- The Vault (26 March 2021)
- Assault on VA-33 (2 April 2021)
- Night of the Sicario (16 April 2021)
- Wildcat (23 April 2021)
- Percy (30 April 2021)
- Initiation (7 May 2021)
- Locked In (7 May 2021)
- Under the Stadium Lights (4 June 2021)
- Occupation: Rainfall (11 June 2021)
- Long Story Short (2 July 2021)
- Twist (30 July 2021), North American release
- Crime Story (13 August 2021)
- The Colony (27 August 2021)
- Zone 414 (3 September 2021)
- Dragon Rider (10 September 2021)
- Apache Junction (24 September 2021)
- Crazy About You (24 September 2021)
- American Night (1 October 2021)
- American Insurrection (8 October 2021)
- Last Man Down (October 19, 2021), co-distribution with Well Go USA Entertainment
- Every Last One of Them (22 October 2021)
- Ida Red (5 November 2021)
- A Gift from Bob (5 November 2021)
- Multiverse (12 November 2021), co-distribution with Well Go USA Entertainment
- Boiling Point (19 November 2021)
- Hide and Seek (19 November 2021)
- Pups Alone (19 November 2021)
- Deadlock (3 December 2021)
- Mosley (10 December 2021)
- American Sicario (10 December 2021)
- The Commando (7 January 2022)
- Borrego (14 January 2022)
- Warhunt (21 January 2022)
- Two Deaths of Henry Baker (25 January 2022)
- The Requin (28 January 2022)
- Here Before (11 February 2022)
- The Ledge (18 February 2022)
- Gasoline Alley (25 February 2022)
- Asking for It (4 March 2022)
- The Girl on the Mountain (8 March 2022)
- The Hyperions (10 March 2022), distributed by The Daily Wire
- The Exorcism of God (11 March 2022)
- Panama (18 March 2022)
- So Cold The River (25 March 2022)
- Bull (1 April 2022)
- Agent Game (8 April 2022)
- Chariot (15 April 2022)
- Hostile Territory (22 April 2022)
- The Aviary (29 April 2022)
- Shepherd (6 May 2022)
- Monstrous (13 May 2022), distributed by Screen Media Films
- There Are No Saints (27 May 2022)
- The Siege of Robin Hood (3 June 2022)
- Blowback (17 June 2022)
- Cryo (24 June 2022)
- Take the Night (8 July 2022)
- American Carnage (15 July 2022)
- Blackwood (22 July 2022)
- The Moderator (29 July 2022)
- My Favorite Girlfriend (5 August 2022)
- Stowaway (5 August 2022)
- The Runner (19 August 2022)
- Maneater (26 August 2022)
- Hunted (26 August 2022)
- One Way (2 September 2022)
- House of Darkness (9 September 2022)
- Dig (23 September 2022)
- Mona Lisa and the Blood Moon (30 September 2022)
- Summit Fever (14 October 2022)
- American Murderer (28 October 2022)
- On the Line (4 November 2022)
- Paradise City (11 November 2022)
- The Last Manhunt (November 18, 2022)
- Black Warrant (9 December 2022)
- High Heat (16 December 2022)
- The Old Way (6 January 2023)
- Ambush (24 February 2023)
- Supercell (17 March 2023)
- Assassin (31 March 2023)
- The Best Man (21 April 2023)
- Aimee (20 June 2023)
- The Flood (14 July 2023)
- The Island (21 July 2023)
- Shrapnel (28 July 2023)
- Mob Land (4 August 2023)
- 3 Days in Malay (11 August 2023)
- Nandor Fodor and the Talking Mongoose (1 September 2023)
- Dark Asset (22 September 2023)
- Safehouse (28 September 2023)
- In the Fire (13 October 2023)
- Butcher's Crossing (20 October 2023)
- Boudica: Queen of War (27 October 2023)
- Black Noise (3 November 2023)
- Kane (10 November 2023)
- Due Justice (24 November 2023)
- The Portrait (8 December 2023)
- Ruthless (15 December 2023)
- Hellhound (12 January 2024)
- Cult Killer January 19, 2024
- The Bad Shepherd (23 February 2024)
- Knox Goes Away (15 March 2024)
- Cash Out (26 April 2024)
- End of the Rope (17 May 2024)
- Darkness of Man (21 May 2024)
- The Outlaws (12 July 2024)
- The Clean Up Crew (20 August 2024)
- The 4:30 Movie (13 September 2024)
- The Stoic (October 18, 2024)
- Classified (22 October 2024)
- Laws of Man (10 January 2025)
- Into the Deep (24 January 2025)
- Everyone Is Going to Die (21 February 2025)
- Silent Zone (7 March 2025)
- High Rollers (14 March 2025)
- The Last Spark of Hope (29 April 2025)
- Fear Below (2 May 2025)
- Resurrection Road (6 June 2025)
- The Unholy Trinity (13 June 2025), co-distribution with Roadside Attractions
- In Vitro (27 June 2025)
- Bang (11 July 2025)
- Strange Harvest (8 August 2025), co-distribution with Roadside Attractions
- Traumatika (12 September 2025)
- Compulsion (19 September 2025)
- Exit Protocol (7 November 2025)
- King Ivory, (14 November 2025) co-distribution with Roadside Attractions
- The Perfect Gamble (14 November 2025)
- Relentless (9 January 2026)
- In Cold Light (23 January 2026)
- Grizzly Night (30 January 2026)
- Sweetness (13 February 2026)
- Hellfire (17 February 2026)
- Redux Redux (20 February 2026)
- Fuze (24 April 2026) co-distribution with Roadside Attractions
- Dirty Hands (24 April 2026)
- An Enemy Within (15 May 2026)
- Badland Rising (12 June 2026)
- Land of Wolves (19 June 2026)
- Lucky Strike (26 June 2026) co-distribution with Roadside Attractions
- Gangland (10 July 2026)
- In A Cold Vein (17 July 2026)
- Haunted Heist (24 July 2026)
- Son of Sara (31 July 2026)
- Atlas King (21 August 2026)
- Buddy (28 August 2026) co-distribution with Roadside Attractions
- Knightfall (11 September 2026)
- The Florist (9 October 2026)
- Crawlers (16 October 2026) co-distribution with Roadside Attractions
- The Holiday Hitman(3 November 2026)
- Deadbolt(13 November 2026)
- The Designer(4 December 2026)
- Frostbite(18 December 2026)
- The Caged(5 January 2027)

== Upcoming ==
=== Undated films ===
- Blood Behind Us
- Ignition
- Keep Quiet
- Straight Shot
- Alphas
