= Silent Zone =

2025 Hungarian film

- Official release poster
- Directed by: Peter Deak
- Written by: Viktor Csák; Krisztián Illés
- Produced by: Peter Deak
- Starring: Matt Devere; Luca Papp; Nikolett Barabas; Declan Hannigan; Alexis Latham
- Cinematography: Balázs Dobóczi
- Edited by: Attila Lecza
- Music by: Arthur Valentin Grósz
- Production companies: FilmFinity; Sysplex Media
- Distributed by: Saban Films
- Release date: 7 March 2025
- Country: Hungary
- Language: English

Silent Zone is a 2025 Hungarian survival apocalyptic horror film co-written by Viktor Csák, Krisztián Illés and directed by Peter Deak. It stars Matt Devere, Luca Papp, Nikolett Barabas, Declan Hannigan and Alexis Latham. The film was distributed by Saban Films.

== Plot ==
In 2012, a viral pandemic which turns people into rabid "ferals" ravages the world. A young girl named Abigail, her mother and brother prepare to evacuate and join their father, who is abroad, but on the verge of leaving they are attacked by a feral. Her mother and brother are infected and turned into ferals as well, but Abigail is rescued and adopted by Cassius, a police officer. They retreat into the wilderness, where they survive by hunting, foraging, and periodically moving their camp to hide from the ferals.

Ten years later, Abigail and Cassius plan on retreating to an island off the American east coast. When a pack of ferals encroaches on their location, they make their move. On their way, they encounter a band of armed survivors and are attacked by the pack; most of the survivors are killed, but Abigail and Cassius escape with a heavily pregnant woman named Megan and her husband David. During the fight, Cassius kills the mate of the pack's alpha, causing the latter to pursue them with even more zeal. With their escape car damaged beyond repair, the fugitives reach an abandoned city, where Abigail's father kept his private turboprop plane, and they stay for the night. Abigail learns from Megan and David that they were on their way to a boat town in the Northeast, which they have contacted via radio. Abigail votes for joining them, but Cassius, who has grown bitter over having seen so many friends and loved ones die or become ferals, decides to stick to his original plan.

The next morning, the feral pack tracks the fugitives down, forcing them to move on. They reach the airport and find the plane, but the pack closes in before they can finish the repairs properly. Taking off immediately, they escape the ferals, but soon after the plane's engine malfunctions, causing it to crash. With his plans upended, Cassius decides to go for the boat colony, which is nearer. As they continue, David, who was bitten by a feral but kept his injury secret, is found out by Cassius, who leaves him alive for the moment in order to avoid upsetting Megan and Abigail.

As night falls, the group reaches a forest hut, where they encounter its owner Norton, an engineer. They are given shelter, but during a conversation they are disturbed by Norton's claims that the pandemic is nature's way of evolutionarily cleansing humanity, enabling only the strong to survive. They are knocked out by the drugged drinks Norton offered them, and when David's infections progresses to its final stage, Norton subdues him with a special sonic gauntlet he constructed to control the ferals. He imprisons the fugitives and unleashes his wife, who is feral, on them; David frees himself and fights her off, allowing his group to escape in Norton's land rover.

The stress causes Megan to go into labor, and the car is held up by an obstacle, forcing them to continue on foot. David stays behind, delaying the pursuing ferals until the Alpha kills him. Abigail, Cassius and Megan reach the colony called King's Harbor, a conglomerate of freight ships surrounding the remnants of a dam building project, and are taken in by its occupants. Megan gives birth to a daughter, but dies from the strain, and Cassius promises her to look after the baby. Meanwhile, Abigail befriends a local youth named Roderick, who shows her an explosive booby trap and an escape tunnel, to be used in case the ferals board the colony.

Norton tracks the fugitives down and brings the ferals aboard the colony, unleashing them on the unsuspecting colonists. Abigail and Cassius coordinate a hasty evacuation until Norton corners Cassius. As the gloating Norton stands over him, Cassius smashes the former's gauntlet, stripping him off his protection, and the ferals kill the mad engineer. Abigail has a brief encounter with the Alpha, who turns out to be her father, before she and Cassius escape through the tunnel. Roderick triggers the explosives, destroying the colony and the ferals still onboard. Abigail and Cassius rejoin the surviving colonists, but are attacked by the Alpha, who overpowers Cassius until Abigail overcomes her hesitation and kills him. With the colony gone, Abigail and Cassius resume their original plan and lead the survivors to their island refuge.

== Cast ==
- Luca Papp as Abigail
  - Katalin Krenn as young Abigail
- Matt Devere as Cassius
- Nikolett Barabas as Megan
- Declan Hannigan as David, Megan's husband
- Alexis Latham as Norton, an engineer
- Katia Bokor as Midwife Josie
- Roderick Hill as George, leader of the refugee colony King's Harbor
- Julian Krenn as Roderick, a youth from King's Harbor who befriends Abigail
- Harry Szovik as John, George's second in command
- Márk Palla as Alpha/Abigail's father
- Ágota Dunai as Roderick's girlfriend
- Caroline Boulton as Abigail's mother
- Anders Olof Grundberg as Luke (credited as "Abigail's brother")
- David Fox as Trevor
- Robert Jackson as Traveler #1
- Aniek Jacobs as Emma
- Niels Jacobs as Lucas
- Kata Gellén as Norton's wife

== Release ==
The film was released in Italy and United States through VOD on 7 March 2025, and will release at United Kingdom and Germany in DVD and Blu-ray on 27 March 2025.

== Reception ==
Tom Meek of Cambridge Day gave the film a rating of 2 stars out of 4 stars and wrote;

For its shoestring budget, “Silent Zone,” directed by Péter Deák, does impress in makeup, sets and action choreography. Devere’s Cassius is a bit too one-note, but Papp provides a grounding offset with a wisp of naiveté.
