= Apache Junction (film) =

- Directed by: Justin Lee
- Written by: Justin Lee
- Produced by: Justin Lee; Daemon Hillin
- Starring: Stuart Townsend; Trace Adkins; Scout Taylor-Compton; Thomas Jane
- Cinematography: Logan Fulton
- Edited by: Eamon Long
- Music by: Christopher Cano; Eduardo Olguin
- Production companies: Origo Financial Services; Film Bridge International; TB Films; Benetone Films; Hillin Entertainment
- Distributed by: Saban Films; Lionsgate
- Release date: September 24, 2021
- Running time: 94 minutes
- Countries: United States; Thailand
- Language: English

Apache Junction is a 2021 Thai-American Western action adventure crime film written and directed by Justin Lee and starring Stuart Townsend, Trace Adkins, Scout Taylor-Compton and Thomas Jane.

== Cast ==
- Stuart Townsend as Jericho Ford
- Scout Taylor-Compton as Annabelle Angel
- Trace Adkins as Captain Hensley
- Danielle Gross as Mary Primm
- Ricky Lee as Wasco
- Ed Morrone as Oslo Pike
- Victoria Pratt as Christine Williams
- Thomas Jane as Al Longfellow

== Release ==
The film was released on September 24, 2021.

== Reception ==
Joe Leydon of Variety gave the film a positive review and wrote, "Stuart Townsend and Scout Taylor-Compton are well-cast as archetypical Western characters while Trace Adkins again demonstrates commanding on-screen presence."
