= Ruthless (2023 film) =

2023 American film by Art Camacho

- Official release poster
- Directed by: Art Camacho
- Written by: Javier Reyna; James Dean Simington; Art Camacho
- Produced by: Elias Axume; Al Bravo; Art Camacho; HemDee Kiwanuka
- Starring: Dermot Mulroney
- Cinematography: Brandon Ruiz
- Edited by: Rylan Rafferty
- Music by: Mauricio Yazigi
- Production companies: Al Bravo Films; Premiere Entertainment Group
- Distributed by: Saban Films
- Release date: December 15, 2023
- Running time: 92 minutes
- Country: United States
- Language: English
- Box office: $25,961

Ruthless is a 2023 American action thriller film written by Javier Reyna, James Dean Simington and Art Camacho, directed by Camacho and starring Dermot Mulroney.

== Plot ==
The teenage daughter of Harry, a high school wrestling coach, is murdered and the killer sent to prison. Subsequently he becomes concerned about one of his students, a young girl named Catia, who is being physically abused at home by her stepfather. Harry takes it upon himself to protect Catia and provide her with a safe haven, but his actions soon involve him in a dangerous human trafficking ring. When Catia is kidnapped by the traffickers, Harry embarks on a dangerous mission to Las Vegas, rescue her and bring down the criminals.

As Harry delves deeper into the world of human trafficking, he discovers that the problem is more widespread and insidious than he first thought.

== Cast ==
- Dermot Mulroney as Harry
- Jeff Fahey as Dale
- Melissa Diaz as Catia
- Mauricio Mendoza
- Tonantzin Esparza
- Niko Foster

== Production ==
In October 2022, it was announced that Mulroney was cast as the lead in the film, and in November of that same year, principal photography had begun in Las Vegas.

In June 2023, it was announced that Saban Films acquired the rights to the film.

== Release ==
The film was released in limited theaters and on VOD in the United States on December 15, 2023. It was subsequently released on streaming platform Hulu on April 13, 2024. Upon its debut on Amazon Prime in June 2026, the film was a success and landed in the top 10 most streamed media on the service for several weeks.

== Reception ==
On the review aggregator website Rotten Tomatoes, 38% of 8 critics' reviews are positive, with an average rating of 1.9/10.
