= Borrego (film) =

2022 thriller film released in theaters and Netflix

- Promotional poster
- Directed by: Jesse Harris
- Screenplay by: Jesse Harris
- Produced by: Jesse Harris; Tiziano Tucci; Greg Lauritano; Nancy Cartwright; Monica Gil-Rodriguez; Fernando Bofill; Gabriel Carratu
- Starring: Lucy Hale; Leynar Gomez; Nicholas Gonzalez; Olivia Trujillo; Jorge A. Jimenez
- Cinematography: Octavio Arias
- Edited by: Luis Carballar
- Music by: The Newton Brothers
- Distributed by: Saban Films
- Release date: January 14, 2022
- Running time: 102 minutes
- Country: United States
- Languages: English; Spanish

Borrego is 2022 American survival-crime-thriller film written and directed by Jesse Harris. The film stars Lucy Hale, Leynar Gomez, Nicholas Gonzalez, Olivia Trujillo, and Jorge A. Jimenez. The film is about a kidnapped botanist working in the desert of California.

The film was released in theaters and on-demand on January 14, 2022, by Saban Films. It was later released on Netflix on May 14, 2022, and reached the Global Top 10 the first week of release.

== Plot ==
The film follows a young botanist who moves to a small desert town in California to study an invasive plant species but must fight for her survival when she's kidnapped by an inexperienced drug mule after his ultralight plane crashes in the desert. The nearby small town's Sheriff, his daughter, and drug receiver all become intertwined in the odyssey. The script was inspired by writer/director Jesse Harris's dad who is a botanist.

== Cast ==
- Lucy Hale as Elly
- Leynar Gomez as Tomas
- Nicholas Gonzalez as Deputy Jose Gomez
- Jorge A. Jimenez as Guillermo
- Olivia Trujillo as Alex Gomez
- Nancy Cartwright as Deserie

== Production ==
The film was originally scheduled to shoot in early 2020, but was delayed due to the COVID-19 pandemic. It later began filming on October 14, 2020, and concluded on November 14, 2020, in Almeria, Spain. Additional filming in Borrego Springs, CA took place in the spring of 2021. First-look images were released during Cannes film market in July 2021.

== Release ==
In October 2021, Saban Films acquired the USA and Spanish rights to the film. It was released in theaters and on-demand on January 14, 2022. The film was released by Netflix in the US and Canada on May 14, 2022. It was the #3 Best Rated Film on IMDB for January 2022. The film reached the Global Top 10 the first week of release.

== Reception ==
The film received mixed reviews from critics. On the review aggregator website Rotten Tomatoes, 27% of 15 critics' reviews are positive, with an average rating of 5.4/10.

James Verniere of The Boston Herald rated the film a B+ and called it "a well-made and gripping crime thriller". Joel Damos of Movie Mensch rated it a B+ and stated that "Lucy Hale shines in timely thriller". Jeffrey Anderson of Common Sense Media rated the film three stars out of five, stating that it "doesn't always work, especially when cutting away from its two main characters, but this sun-baked, anti-drug desert-survival thriller is solid enough at its center to make it worth a look."

Jon Mendelsohn of Comic Book Resources called the film "a dull would-be thriller that takes an idea that'd fit a 10-minute sequence better and drags the conceit out to a feature film length." Sheila O'Malley of RogerEbert.com gave the film two stars, describing it as "an awkward thriller pasted onto a moody strangers-forging-a-connection drama."

Borrego was ranked as the third best-rated film for January 2022 on IMDb. On its US streaming premiere in May 2022, the film made it into Netflix's Global Top 10 list.
