= An Intrusion =

- Directed by: Nicholas Holland
- Written by: Nicholas Holland
- Produced by: Nicholas Holland; Sam Logan Khaleghi; Alexander M. Norris
- Starring: Keir Gilchrist; Scout Taylor-Compton
- Cinematography: Cy Abdelnour
- Music by: Andy Nelson
- Production company: Diamond Dead Media
- Distributed by: Gravitas Ventures
- Release dates: October 14, 2021 (Chelsea); November 26, 2021 (United States & Canada)
- Country: United States
- Language: English

An Intrusion is a 2021 American thriller film written and directed by Nicholas Holland and starring Keir Gilchrist and Scout Taylor-Compton.

== Plot ==
The week of Christmas, Rebecca Hodges is frightened in her home one night when she sees someone in a mask depicting a woman's face has broken in and has been watching her in the dark. After being chased briefly, her parents Sam and Joyce are woken up before the intruder smashes their kitchen window with a Christmas decoration before running away. They call the police and after finding nothing, they agree to check up on them for the time being routinely. After the police leave, it is revealed through conversation that Sam doesn't trust his daughter and her relationship with a senior at school and that the family has been experiencing various degrees of vandalism in the week leading up to the incident. Joyce is concerned while Sam thinks it's likely Rebecca's boyfriend Layne Lewis is involved.

It is then shown that Sam has been having an affair with a woman named Julia Hilt, a paralegal at the law firm where he is an attorney. He attempts to end things that morning with the woman before work but has sex one final time with her before leaving. Later that morning, Sam receives an email from an unknown sender with pictures of him and Julia having sex in her apartment earlier that morning with an ominous message about the interior of his home. He attempts to hide the information and his concern when his co-worker and brother-in-law Chris comes to his office before eventually deleting the email, believing the threat to be a bluff. Meanwhile, Rebecca and her friend Mel pull her car over after leaving school due to a foul smell coming from the trunk while Layne watches from a distance. The girls are frightened when they find a dead deer. Sam attempts to speak to Julia about the email, which she shows great concern over when Joyce calls and tells him what has happened.

At the police station, Sam is questioned by Detective Savannah Simpson about the vandalism, intruder, and the dead deer, believing it is likely either someone close to the family, someone stalking Rebecca, or someone with a personal grudge against Sam. He casually mentions that he has been also receiving threatening emails that he thinks are related but declines to allow Savannah to see them due to what says are "sensitive work matters." She finds this strange but says she will continue to follow up and check in with the family.

The night, Sam hears noises in Rebecca's room before he finds a taunting letter left on his windshield. He accuses Rebecca of secretly having Layne over that night, which she denies before someone breaks into the house in the basement. Sam goes to investigate with a baseball, shouting that he has a gun, but finds a Santa decoration left in the cellar with a note left by the intruder that says they know he doesn't own a gun. Joyce and Rebecca watch as Sam alarmingly and violently begins to destroy the Santa Claus decoration with the baseball bat.

The next day, Joyce taunts Sam when he begins drinking heavily after buying a new shotgun for home defense. She hints that she knows he has been keeping some kind of a secret before taking a bath. Sam follows her to the bathroom to speak further and finds Joyce dead in a tub filled with blood, both of her wrists having been cut open. Sam suddenly awakens in his dining room, the encounter with Joyce a nightmare, though there is still a bottle of alcohol and a new shotgun in front of him. At that moment, Savannah knocks at the door. He hides the shotgun and lets her in and they briefly speak about the continued home invasions. She now fully believes the person is someone the family knows personally. When Joyce, Rebecca, and Layne stop at the house on their way to go Christmas shopping together, Savannah watches Sam's attitude and treatment of Layne and asks if he may suspect his involvement. Sam says he does and she agrees to look into the young man.

That night, while Rebecca is supposed to be sleeping at Mel's, Sam and Joyce go out to dinner with Chris and his wife Terri, and over drinks, Chris tells a story about Julia running into problems at work that day and possibly being fired soon. Sam pretends to not know much about the woman, much to Chris's surprise. When Rebecca calls Joyce to say her plans were canceled, she leaves to return home. On the drive back, an intoxicated Joyce reminisces about the earlier years in their marriage when they were both happier and Sam was noticeably more attracted to her. He rejects an advancement of hers, however, noticeably upsetting her.

When they return home, Sam hears someone on the back porch and sends Joyce inside. He hides and when he sees the shadow of someone trying to sneak around the house quietly with a hood drawn, he begins to bludgeon them with a shovel. He finds that the person he has killed is Layne, who he proudly acknowledges he suspected all along. Sam tells Joyce he found nothing outside but that he left his phone at the bar earlier, and that he'll be back after retrieving it. He then sneaks away in the car to bury Layne's body in the woods before returning home in a relaxed state and waking Joyce up to have sex.

The next day at work, however, Sam receives another email from the stalker containing pictures of him burying Layne in the woods, proving that he killed the wrong person. He begins when immediately after, he is requested to the police station by Savannah. Sam begins to behave suspiciously in the interview, and Savannah tells him that Layne has just been reported missing. She tells Sam this seems more than a coincidence after discovering how much he distrusts the teen and Sam says he will not speak with the detective further without his lawyer present. In the parking lot, he receives a phone call from Joyce, but the caller is an unseen, hooded man sitting in their home while Joyce takes a bath, revealing that he is the one who has been following Sam. He threatens to leave the pictures of the affair and of Sam burying Layne if Sam does not agree to meet him at a club downtown that night to speak. Sam reluctantly agrees.

Sam goes to The Sanctuary, an electronic goth club, where everyone seems suspicious of his out-of-place presence. While ordering a drink, he runs into Julia and begins to panic, believing that this meeting is a setup. Outside, Sam angrily accuses Julia of being involved with the stalker and physically threatens her, but Julia says she is not intimidated by him and never wants to see her again. She goes back inside, relieved to be rid of Sam, and begins to dance while Sam chases someone in the alley he believes is the stalker. They begin to fight, no one inside hearing the shouting over the music, and when the man pulls out a knife, Sam attacks him with a brick and severs two fingers on the man's right hand, causing him to flee.

The next morning is Christmas Eve and the Hodges family attends the baptism of Chris and Terri's son. Sam grows uncomfortable when the church and the Minister begin to hold a faith healing ceremony for a woman in the congregation who is a burn victim that they believed was the result of her recent infidelities. Unsure if this is directed at him as well, he nervously sits through the ceremony until it ends and finds that it is entirely a coincidence, but as they prepare to leave, an unseen person with missing fingers touches him on the shoulder and wishes him a merry Christmas. He begins to panic, suspecting everyone in the church, including a child whose hand is in a cast. The Minister and his family begin to watch in horror as he angrily shouts at the boy before getting into a fight with the father.

The police arrive and break the fight up and Sam receives a call from Savannah, who reveals she has convinced the man to drop the charges, but that she does not trust him at all now, she too then wishes him a merry Christmas. On the way home, Joyce angrily pulls over and, in dialogue similar to his nightmare earlier, reveals that she knows there is something bigger going on. That night, after an emotional breakdown, Joyce begs Sam to tell her if he has been having an affair and he tells her he has. As they argue in the living room, Rebecca is attacked in her bedroom by someone hiding in the closet wearing the same mask from earlier in the film. The intruder and Sam get into a fight and Sam is knocked unconscious before the masked individual then attacks the two women. Eventually, he is stabbed in the foot by Rebecca with a kitchen knife before being shot by a now-conscious Sam with the shotgun he purchased earlier. When the police arrive, they remove the intruder's mask and neither Sam nor anyone else recognizes the identity of the man. Savannah tells Sam she's sorry for suspecting he was the one terrorizing his own family and that she'll let him know when they find out who the dead man is.

The next night during Christmas, the Hodges family stays with Joyce's parents and reconciles their marriage, Joyce saying she just wants to start over fresh. As a peace offering, Sam agrees to go to the bar they frequent to get a pizza since they are open on Christmas.

At the bar, Sam shares drinks with a man named Devin while waiting for his food. The two happily share stories about love and loss while listening to Christmas music and drinking and Sam offers him relationship advice as the man talks about his own misfortunes in life. Sam soon notices, however, that the man is missing two fingers on his right hand and that Devin was the one who he fought with in the alley. Devin reveals that he is one of several stalkers who have been following him for some time and has enjoyed using Sam's personality traits against him, including his tendency to lie and hide things. He forces Sam to leave in his car with him after threatening the safety of Rebecca and Joyce. On the way back to Sam's house, Devin tells him that he has something planned for Sam and that if he does everything he says, he promises everything will be over and he and his family will live. Devin then asks Sam if he remembers a girl from college named Molly. Sam is shocked to discover that this entire matter has been over her and not his affair.

At the house, Rebecca and Joyce are being held at gunpoint outside their home by another man named Mason as Savannah and dozens of officers attempt to negotiate with him. Devin walks Sam into the driveway beside them at gunpoint and Savannah asks why the men called them and arranged this. At gunpoint, with tears in his eyes, Sam is forced to tell the police, his wife and daughter that in college, he raped a girl named Molly at a party, but due to his family's wealth, they were able to sue and slander her for trying to tell the authorities which caused her to be kicked out of the college. Sam blames the attack on having been drunk and says that he'd forgotten about it after so many years. The police, Joyce, and Rebecca are forced to continue listening as Devin reveals that Molly's life spiraled out of control shortly after those events and that while living in poverty, she had three different sons with different men before ultimately committing suicide. Devin tells him that poverty and the foster care system brutalized the three of them as children and that he and Mason's third brother was Corey, the man in the mask who Sam had shot the night before. Devin hints that it's possible Corey was Sam's illegitimate son from the sexual assault. Savannah sympathizes with Devin and Mason and offers to help the two of them, but Devin apologizes and in a plan to commit suicide by cop, they both raise their guns and are killed by the police. Joyce and Rebecca, traumatized by the incident, stare at Sam as Savannah pulls them away and Sam lowers his head in shame, knowing that he can no longer control the narrative and image of who he is to these women.

== Cast ==
- Dustin Prince as Sam Hodges
- Keir Gilchrist as Layne Lewis
- Billy Boyd as Minister Fairfield
- Scout Taylor-Compton as Detective Savannah Simpson
- Sam Logan Khaleghi as Chris
- Erika Hoveland as Joyce Hodges
- Michael Emery as Devin
- Angelina Danielle Cama as Rebecca Hodges
- Kayla Kelly as Julia Hilt
- Jaime Zevallos as Detective Castillo
- Jerry Narsh as Detective Marsh
- Allison Megroet as Mel

== Production ==
The film had initially been laid out to be a micro-budget project written by Holland with the intention of filming with friends to later pitch for distribution after Holland's previous self funded film 'Wronged' had done the same two years prior. However, after several interested parties, including Gilchrist, came aboard after reading the script, the indie film with its meager $60,000 budget began to grow and widen into a larger production with a much wider scope. The initial (mostly unknown cast) remained attached in the principal roles while bigger names, like Scout Taylor-Compton, were attached at the request and suggestion of producers to give the film cast familiarity. Principal photography took place in December 2019 in Detroit and Oakland County, Michigan. The final shoot had been pushed back by the COVID-19 pandemic, causing the film to be delayed in both shooting and post production until the end of 2020.

In September 2021, it was announced that Gravitas Ventures acquired North American distribution rights to the film.

== Release ==
The film premiered as the opening night film at the Chelsea Film Festival on October 14, 2021. It was then released in the United States and Canada on November 26, 2021.

== Reception ==
The film released to generally mixed reviews, some finding the film's climax and twist in particular either genuinely surprising, or frustrating due to an inability to predict the identity of the intruder(s) for the audience. Another common criticism was Holland's choice to center the film around what is ultimately revealed to be an antagonist and follow him around in his day-to-day routine while choosing to neither take an empathetic or sympathetic route, making the film feel cold and apathetic.

Michael Talbot-Haynes of Film Threat rated the film a 7.5 out of 10.

Cody Hamman of JoBlo.com gave the film a positive review and wrote, "The cast is quite good all around, with Hoveland doing some impressive work in the emotional moments she was given."
