= Scott Perlman (filmmaker) =

American writer, director, and producer (born 2006)

- Occupations: Writer, Director, Producer
- Years active: 2006–present

Scott Perlman is an American writer, director, and producer best known for the 2018 film Andover, his directorial début.

== Career ==
Perlman wrote and directed Andover, winner of Best Feature and the Audience Choice Award at the Orlando Film Festival, he created the iTVFest Best Overall TV show Going to Pot, and produced the Lower Great Lakes Emmy Awards winning Fox Sports 1 hour special Make 'em Forget. Perlman co-wrote Kate & Edith which won the Gold Prize for best sitcom at the PAGE International Screenwriting Awards.
