= The Commando =

2022 American film by Asif Akbar

- Official release poster
- Directed by: Asif Akbar
- Written by: Koji Steven Sakai
- Story by: Asif Akbar; Koji Steven Sakai; Al Bravo
- Produced by: Elias Axume; Philip Tan
- Starring: Mickey Rourke; Michael Jai White
- Cinematography: Jorge Gomez
- Edited by: RJ Cooper
- Music by: Mauricio Yazigi
- Production companies: Premiere Entertainment; Al Bravo Films; Little Nalu Pictures; Avail Entertainment
- Distributed by: Saban Films
- Release date: January 7, 2022
- Running time: 93 minutes
- Country: United States
- Language: English

The Commando is a 2022 American action crime film directed by Asif Akbar and starring Mickey Rourke and Michael Jai White.

It was released in the United States on January 7, 2022, by Saban Films.

== Plot ==
A DEA SWAT team, led by elite DEA agent James Baker (Michael Jai White), assaults a Mexican cartel's drug lab. The bad guys are taken out in the ensuing gun fight, but Baker inadvertently kills three hostages, a mother and her two daughters. As a result of PTSD-induced hallucinations, nightmares, and not being able to differentiate between reality and illusion, Baker is sent home to recover.

During this time, one of his daughters makes an unexpected discovery in their home—a stash worth $3 million. It’s revealed that Baker lives, with his wife Lisa (Aris Mejía) and their two teenage daughters, in the house where career criminal Johnny (Mickey Rourke) had hidden the stolen money.

Johnny catches up with an old friend who is now the town’s sheriff, and he offers him a bribe to help him out. The sheriff sends a deputy to Baker’s home to bring Baker to the station. He tells him he has a warrant for his arrest. Baker looks at it, and realizing it hasn't been signed by a judge, he leaves the station.

The Baker family soon faces the danger and threat of the freshly-sprung Johnny, who quickly reunites with his old crew to recover the $3 million of stolen money. Just before his release, Johnny retaliated against three inmates who tried to shank him right before he was freed.

Needing a break, Baker heads off with his wife Lisa for a quiet weekend together, leaving their two daughters home alone. The youngest girl promptly organizes a house party. The oldest daughter stays in her room and also discovers another stash of money under the flooring. Outside, she bumps into her father's friend Sebastian, who has come to check on them; she shows him what she has found and he tells her to hide it again until they speak to her father. He promptly goes downstairs and sends the party guests home.

During the party, Johnny's goons have been observing the activity in and around the house; they have also killed some of the party guests, getting ready to stage a home invasion.

Johnny’s goons invade the house and kill more guests. The oldest daughter sees this and runs upstairs and hides under her bed, where she calls her father; due to poor reception on his phone, he’s unable to make out what she’s saying.

Baker rings Sebastian, who is already dead and Johnny answers; Baker threatens to kill Johnny if either of his daughters is harmed.

The stakes are high in this head-to-head battle as Baker will stop at nothing to protect his family against the money-hungry criminals.

== Cast ==
- Mickey Rourke as Johnny
- Michael Jai White as James Baker
- Jeff Fahey as Sheriff Alexander
- Brendan Fehr as Sebastian
- Gianni Capaldi as Dominic
- Donald Cerrone as Ray
- Sam Tan as Sean
- Mia Terry as Jennifer
- Nao Maes as Natalie
- Aris Mejía as Lisa
- Matthew Van Wettering as Matthew
- Cord Newman as Rudy
- John Enos III as Trey

== Production ==
In September 2020, it was announced that Rourke was cast in the film. In October 2020, White joined the cast of the film.

Principal photography occurred in New Mexico on October and November 2020.

== Release ==
The film was released by Saban Films on January 7, 2022.

== Reception ==
Rene Rodriguez of Variety gave the film a negative review and wrote, "A talky and lethargic home-invasion thriller, The Commando amounts to an inept crime drama stuffed with banal dialogue and irrelevant supporting characters to pad its feature-length running time."

Leslie Felperin of The Guardian awarded the film one star out of five and wrote, "The Commando contains a number of egregious implausibilities and cliches."
