= HemDee Kiwanuka =

Ugandan film producer & actor

Hemdee Kiwanuka
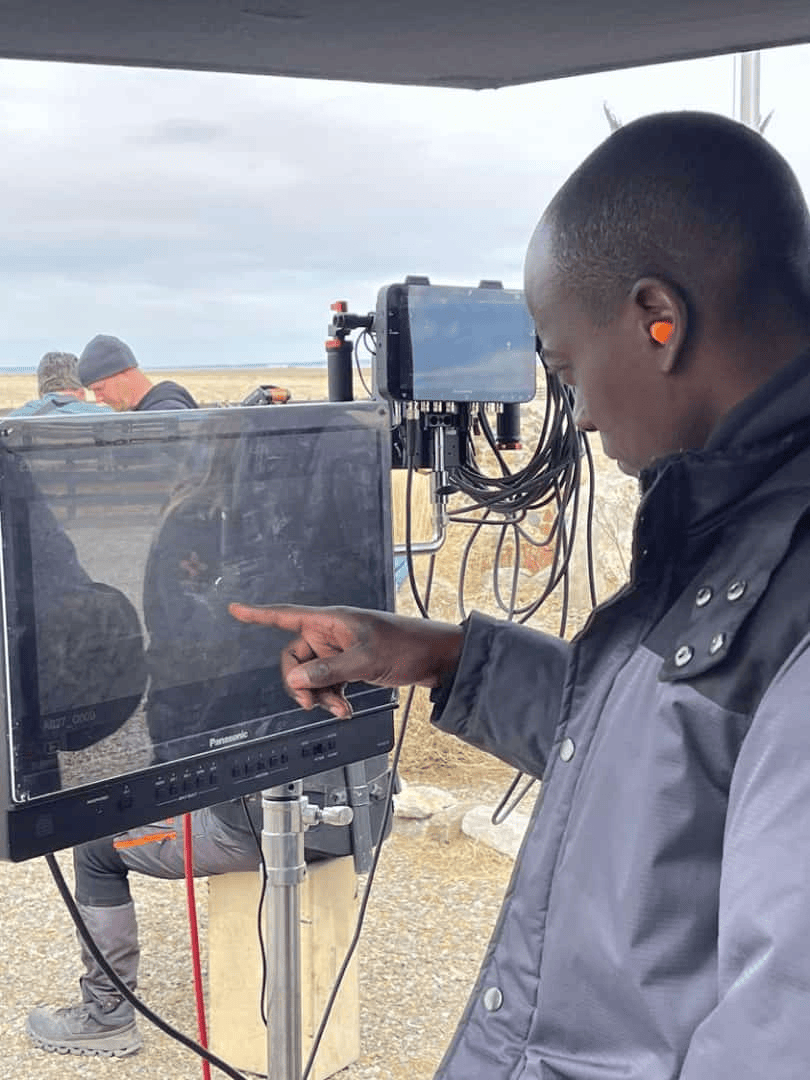
- Hemdee Kiwanuka on set
- Born: Hemdee David Kiwanuka; August 31, 1975 (age 50); Kampala, Uganda
- Occupations: Film and television producer, actor
- Years active: 1994–present
- Known for: film production, movie acting

Hemdee Kiwanuka (born August 31, 1975) is a Ugandan American film producer and actor. He has produced and acted in movies since 2001, such as Grimsby (2016), Army of One (2020) and Jimmy Kimmel Live! (2003).

== Early life ==
Hemdee Kiwanuka was born in 1975 in Kampala, Uganda, to Halima Namakula. In 1987, he relocated to the United States.

== Career ==
Hemdee began his entertainment career as a Hip hop artist in the 1990s. In 2013, Kiwanuka produced his first reality Television Show "Fame In The Family" which aired on E! Network.

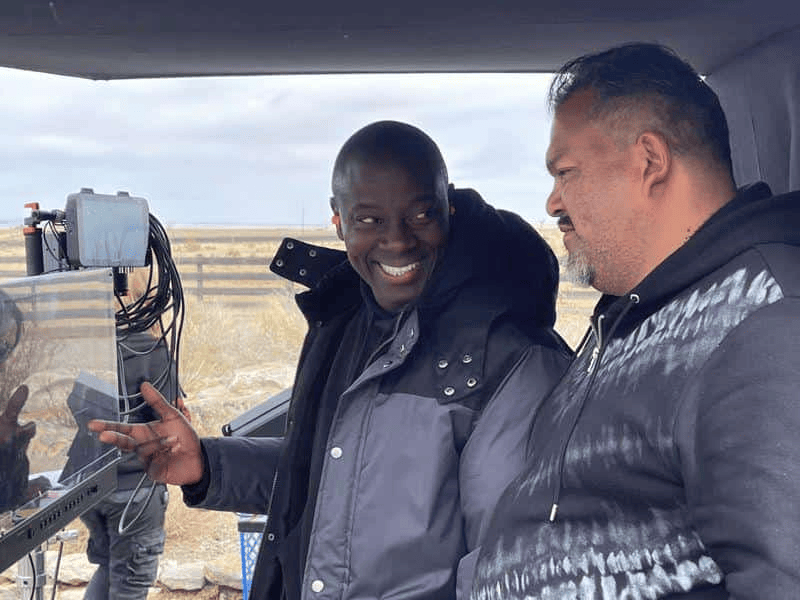
Hemdee and crew

In 2018, Hemdee Kiwanuka premiered his film The Dark Within. In the same year, he and GRB Studios signed a multiyear licensing and distribution deal with Black TV.

== Filmography ==
=== Television ===
| Year | Title | Role | Notes |
|---|---|---|---|
| 2001 | Cannonball Run 2001 | Himself Hip Pop With Pop | Reality TV series; 5 episodes |
| 2009–2011 | Jimmy Kimmel Live! | Kalal and African Man | Talk Show; 2 episodes # 7.70 (2009) #9.148 (2011) |
| 2011 | Tosh.0 | African Man | TV series; 1 episode |
| 2013 | Fame in the Family | Creator/Producer | Reality TV series |

=== Film ===
| Year | Title | Role | Notes |
|---|---|---|---|
| 2012 | Love Collision | Joshua | Actor and producer |
| 2013 | The Uganda | Executive Producer | |
| 2014 | Death Factory | Very Special Thanks | |
| 2016 | Grimsby | Additional voices | |
| 2018 | The Dark Within | Abaddon | Actor and producer |
| 2019 | Army Of One | Dean | Actor and producer |
| 2023 | Ruthless | Producer | |
| 2025 | The Wrecker | Producer | |

== Personal life ==
In 2007, Hemdee Kiwanuka is in relationship with Sheila Mulindwa. In 2018, he was invited to be part of the 14th Annual LA FEMME International Film Festival Awards Ceremony Honoring Rachel Winter and Jaina Lee Ortiz.

== See also ==
- Ugandan Americans
