= The Long Night (2022 film) =

2022 horror film directed by Rich Ragsdale

- Theatrical release poster
- Directed by: Rich Ragsdale
- Written by: Robert Sheppe; Mark Young
- Produced by: Vasily Bernhardt; Daemon Hillin; Ryan R. Johnson; Martin Sprock
- Starring: Scout Taylor-Compton; Nolan Gerard Funk; Jeff Fahey; Deborah Kara Unger
- Cinematography: Pierluigi Malavasi
- Edited by: Jay Gartland
- Music by: Sherri Chung
- Production companies: Sprockefeller Pictures; Adirondack Media Group; El Ride Productions; Hillin Entertainment
- Distributed by: Well Go USA Entertainment
- Release date: February 4, 2022
- Running time: 91 minutes
- Country: United States
- Language: English
- Box office: $81,351

The Long Night (also known as The Coven) is a 2022 American horror film written by Robert Sheppe and Mark Young and directed Rich Ragsdale. It stars Scout Taylor-Compton, Nolan Gerard Funk, Jeff Fahey, Deborah Kara Unger. The film is about a couple whose quiet weekend takes a bizarre turn when a nightmarish cult and their maniacal leader come to fulfill an apocalyptic prophesy.

== Plot ==
A young couple from a big city, Grace and Jack, are on the verge of beginning the rest of their lives together. Two obstacles stand in their way: Grace meets Jack's wealthy, judgmental parents, and Jack accompanies Grace to her hometown in the deep south. There, she desperately wants to locate her biological parents and bring closure to her mysterious childhood past before embracing her bright future.

The meeting with Jack's parents causes a slight rift between the two lovers but is just a foreshadowed speed bump before a full-on collision with terror. Upon arriving at a large estate owned by a man who has reached out to Grace about her past, the couple discovers an empty house shrouded in secrets. Grace begins to mentally unravel as her dark destiny appears to hover over the vast farmhouse walls and seep into her psyche.

The town's welcoming committee arrives at dusk to greet the visitors. Instead of offering food and drink, the masked and cloaked group presents a dead kitten, burning pentagrams, and a symbol of death on a stick. Jack and Grace attempt to fight and flee as the ancient, dark history behind Grace's existence is revealed.

== Cast ==
- Scout Taylor-Compton as Grace
- Nolan Gerard Funk as Jack
- Jeff Fahey as Wayne
- Deborah Kara Unger as The Master
- Erika Stasiuleviciute as Master (flashback)
- Scott Daniel as Torch Coven Member
- Wendy Oates as Coveness
- Kevin Ragsdale as Wade
- Justin Paitsel as Coven Member
- Bobby Davis as Coven Member
- Russ Gladden as Coven Member

== Release ==
It was released on February 4, 2022.

== Reception ==
Metacritic review
breakdown (unweighted)

Positive
2 (33%)
Mixed
2 (33%)
Negative
2 (33%)

On the review aggregator website Rotten Tomatoes, 35% of 26 critics' reviews are positive, with an average rating of 4.8/10. Metacritic, which uses a weighted average, assigned the film a score of 44 out of 100, based on 6 critics, indicating "mixed or average" reviews.

Nadir Samara of Screen Rant give the film a mixed review and wrote:

"When one thinks The Long Night is walking in circles, it breaks off from the beaten path just in time to give viewers exactly the movie that was sold."

Richard Whittaker of The Austin Chronicle give the film a positive review and wrote:

"The Long Night may not be revolutionary, it's definitely got its own dark magic."

Peter Sobczynski of RogerEbert.com give the film a 1 and half star and wrote:

"The Long Night wants to create a sense of encroaching fear and unease in viewers but cannot inspire much of anything other than boredom and apathy. "

Michael Pementel of Bloody Disgusting give the film a mixed to positive review and wrote:

The Long Night still makes for a worthy watch. With its stellar atmosphere, grim violence, and chilling tone, The Long Night evokes a spell that’ll lure viewers into a gripping experience.
