= The Great War (2019 film) =

- Film poster
- Directed by: Steven Luke
- Written by: Steven Luke
- Produced by: Steven Luke; Andre Relis
- Starring: Bates Wilder; Hiram A. Murray; Billy Zane; Ron Perlman
- Cinematography: Joseph Loeffler
- Production companies: VMI Worldwide; Schuetzle Company Productions
- Distributed by: Saban Films
- Release dates: April 7, 2019 (Minneapolis–Saint Paul International Film Festival); December 13, 2019 (United States)
- Running time: 108 minutes
- Country: United States
- Language: English

The Great War is a 2019 American war drama film written and directed by Steven Luke and starring Bates Wilder, Hiram A. Murray, Billy Zane and Ron Perlman.

== Plot ==
In the closing days of the First World War, a young Army captain (Bates Wilder) is tasked by the American commander, General John J. Pershing (Ron Perlman), with rescuing a regiment of African-American soldiers trapped behind enemy lines. In doing so, he confronts not only the perils of the mission, but the racism of many of the white soldiers towards their Black comrades-in-arms.

== Cast ==
- Bates Wilder as Captain William Rivers
- Aaron Courteau as Sergeant Allistor Richardson
- Hiram A. Murray as Private John Cain
- Billy Zane as Colonel Jack Morrison
- Ron Perlman as General John J. Pershing
- Edgar Damatian as Private Cardinni
- Judah McFadden as Private Pinchelli
- Andrew Stecker as Corporal Anson Kirby
- Cody Fleury as Private O'Malley
- Jeremy Michael Pereira as Captain A.J. Stevens

== Reception ==
The film has a 17% rating on Rotten Tomatoes.
