= Cam Gigandet =

American actor (born 1982)

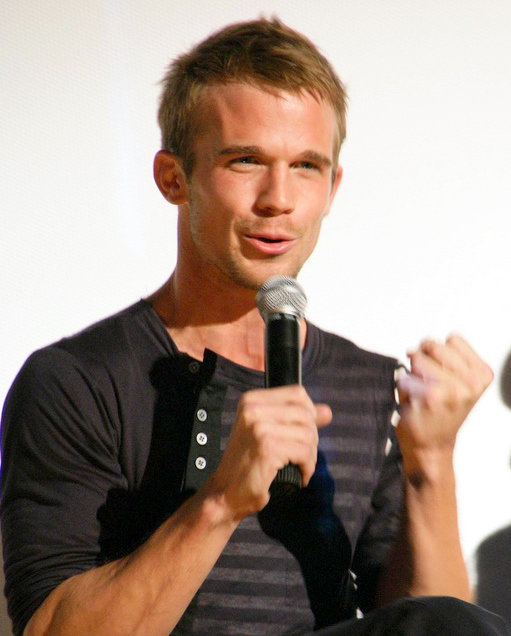
- Gigandet in 2008
- Born: August 16, 1982 (age 43); Tacoma, Washington, U.S.
- Occupation: Actor
- Years active: 2003–present
- Spouse: Dominique Geisendorff (m. 2008; div. 2024)
- Children: 4

Cameron Joslin Gigandet (/ˈkæm ʒɪˈɡɑːndeɪ/; born August 16, 1982) is an American actor whose credits include a recurring role on The O.C. and appearances in feature films Twilight, Pandorum, Never Back Down, Burlesque, Easy A, Priest, and The Magnificent Seven. He also starred in the CBS legal drama series Reckless. From 2016 to 2018, Gigandet starred in the Audience Network drama series Ice.

== Early life ==
Gigandet was born in Tacoma, Washington, to Kim and Jay Gigandet, a co-owner of The Rock pizza franchise. His sister Kelsie is a hair stylist. After graduating from Auburn Senior High School in Auburn, Washington, in 2001, he moved to California, where he attended Santa Monica College.

== Career ==
In 2003, Gigandet made his acting debut with a guest appearance in the crime television series CSI: Crime Scene Investigation. In 2004 and 2005 Gigandet continued his television career with recurring roles in television shows such as The Young and the Restless and Jack and Bobby.

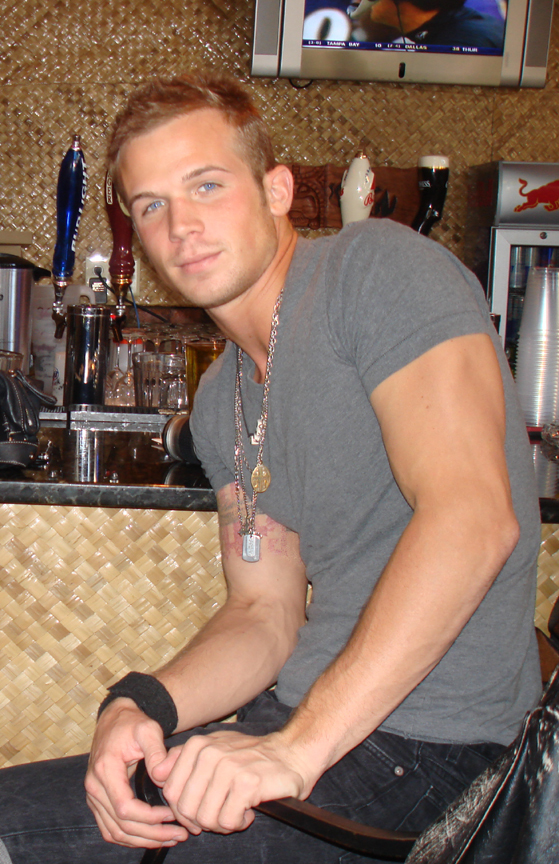
Gigandet in 2006

In 2005–06, Gigandet was cast as Kevin Volchok on the Fox teen drama television series The O.C., appearing in 15 episodes. Gigandet portrayed the role of Kevin, a bad boy and rebellious competitive surfer who develops a casual relationship with rich socialite Marissa Cooper (Mischa Barton). In August 2007, Gigandet was cast in the Summit Entertainment/Mandalay Pictures action drama film Never Back Down. He portrayed the role of villainous bad boy and fighting champion Ryan McCarthy, who sets out to take down the film's protagonist. Gigandet and co-star Sean Faris shared an award for "Best Fight" at the 2008 MTV Movie Awards. In December 2007, Summit Entertainment cast Gigandet in the planned film adaptation of the best-selling vampire book series Twilight by Stephenie Meyer. He signed on to portray the role of the "tracker" vampire James. Gigandet received his second "Best Fight" award win at the 2009 MTV Movie Awards with Robert Pattinson.

In 2008, Gigandet won the award for "One to Watch" at the 10th Annual Young Hollywood Awards. In August 2008, Gigandet signed on to the Screen Gems supernatural horror film The Unborn, portraying the role of the protagonist's love interest. Also in 2009, Gigandet starred as Corporal Gallo in the sci-fi thriller Pandorum. In 2009, Gigandet was cast alongside Leighton Meester and Minka Kelly in the thriller film The Roommate.

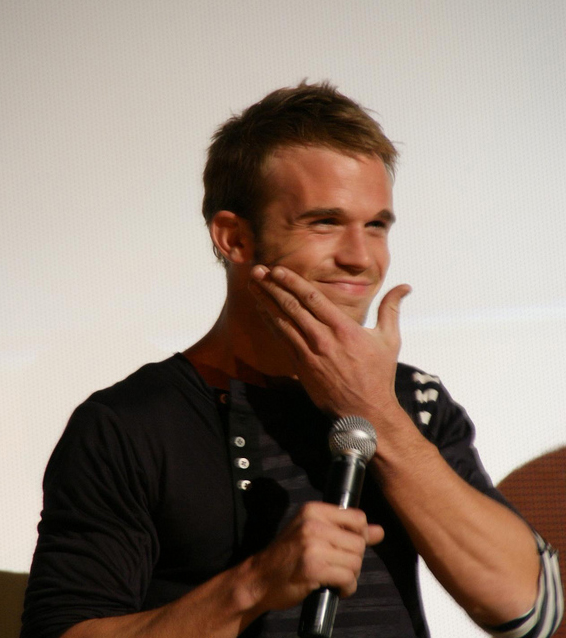
Gigandet, 2008

In 2010, Gigandet portrayed Micah, a Christian high school student, in Easy A. That same year, Gigandet starred as the villainous prison guard Chase in the psychological straight-to-DVD thriller The Experiment. In 2010, Gigandet was cast in the film Burlesque. The film was written and directed by first-time director Steve Antin and starred Cher, Christina Aguilera, and Stanley Tucci.

In 2011, Gigandet portrayed Jonah in the psychological thriller Trespass and had a supporting role in the vampire thriller Priest.

== Personal life ==
Gigandet married Dominique Geisendorff in 2008. They have two daughters, Everleigh and Armie, and a son named Rekker. Geisendorff filed for divorce in August 2022.

On October 16, 2024, Gigandet welcomed his fourth child, a boy named Dare Wylder James Gigandet, with actress Hannah James.

== Filmography ==
=== Film ===
Year	Title	Role	Notes
2004	Mistaken	Joe	Short film
2007	Who's Your Caddy?	Mick	
2008	Never Back Down	Ryan McCarthy	MTV Movie Award for Best Fight (shared with Sean Faris)
2008	American Crude	Kip Adams	
2008	Twilight	James Witherdale	MTV Movie Award for Best Fight (shared with Robert Pattinson); Nominated – Best Villain Award – 2009 Scream Awards
2009	The Unborn	Mark Hardigan	
2009	Pandorum	Gallo	
2010	Easy A	Micah	
2010	Burlesque	Jack Miller	
2010	The Experiment	Chase	
2011	Five Star Day	Jake Gibson	
2011	The Roommate	Stephen Morterelli	
2011	Priest	Hicks	
2011	Trespass	Jonah Collins	
2012	The Tin Star	Jake Flynn	
2012	Making Change	Bishop	
2012	Seal Team Six: The Raid on Osama Bin Laden	Stunner	
2013	Turbo	Snail 1	
2013	Plush	Carter	
2013	Free Ride	Ray	
2014	Red Sky	Butch Masters	
2014	In the Blood	Derek Grant	
2014	4 Minute Mile	Wes Jacobs	
2014	Bad Johnson	Rich Johnson	
2014	Nanny Cam	Mark	
2016	Broken Vows	Michael	
2016	The Magnificent Seven	McCann	
2017	Black Site Delta	Jake	
2017	The Shadow Effect	Gabriel Howarth	
2019	Assimilate	Josh Haywood	
2020	Dangerous Lies	Mickey Hayden	
2021	Without Remorse	Keith Webb	
2021	Last Shoot Out	Sid	
2022	9 Bullets	Tommy	
2022	Blowback	Nick	
2022	Violent Night	Morgan Steele	
2022	Black Warrant	Anthony	
2023	Righteous Thieves	Bruno	
2023	Two Sinners and a Mule	Elden Gallup	
2023	Shrapnel	Max Vohden	
2023	Til Death Do Us Part	Best Man	
2024	Outlaw Posse	Caprice	
2024	Mafia Wars	Griff	
2025	Love Hurts	Renny	Post-production
TBA	The Tower †		Post-production
TBA	Desert Dawn †		Post-production
TBA	72 Hours †		Post-production
TBA	Complex, Texas †		Post-production
TBA	Final Invasion †	Navy Seal Sam Sheppard	Pre-production
TBA	Violence of Action †	Jonah Dekker	In development

Key
†	Denotes works that have not yet been released

=== Television ===
Year	Title	Role	Notes
2003	CSI: Crime Scene Investigation	Mark Young	Episode: "Feeling the Heat"
2004	The Young and the Restless	Daniel Romalotti	7 episodes
2005	Jack & Bobby	Randy Bongard	5 episodes
2005–06	The O.C.	Kevin Volchok	15 episodes
2014	Reckless	Roy Rayder	Main role (13 episodes)
2015	Nanny Cam	Mark Kessler	TV movie
2016–2018	Ice	Jake Green	Main role (20 episodes)

== Awards and nominations ==
Year	Award	Category	Result	Work
2008	Young Hollywood Awards	One to watch	Won	
2008	MTV Movie Awards	Best Fight (shared with Sean Faris)	Won	Never Back Down
2009	MTV Movie Awards	Best Fight (shared with Robert Pattinson)	Won	Twilight
2009	Teen Choice Awards	Choice Movie: Villain	Won	Twilight
2009	Teen Choice Awards	Choice Movie: Rumble (shared with Robert Pattinson)	Won	Twilight
2011	Teen Choice Awards	Choice Movie Actor: Drama	Nominated	The Roommate
