= Halima Namakula =

Musical artist (born 1960)

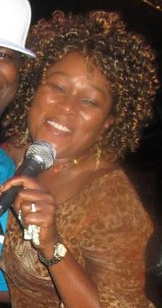
- Halima Namakula (2013)

Background information
- Also known as: The mother of all artists in Uganda
- Born: Halima Namakula; January 1, 1960 (age 66)
- Origin: Kampala, Uganda
- Genre: Afro beat/Reggae/World Beat
- Occupations: Musician, actress, entrepreneur, humanitarian
- Instrument: Vocalist
- Label: No-End Entertainment
- Website: www.halimawo.org

Halima Namakula (born January 1, 1960) is a Ugandan musician, actress, entrepreneur and humanitarian who in 2009 was nominated to represent Uganda in the Mrs. World beauty pageant.

== Early life and education background ==
Halima was born on 1st January,1960 in Kalerwe found in the neighborhood of Kampala, Uganda. She was raised by her mother, Afuwa Namuddu and the only girl among seven children.

She started her primary school education at Kawoya Primary School which is found in Kalerwe. Later changed to Makerere Primary School where she studied for a short time and completed her primary in 1974 at Mandal Primary School which was later renamed Bat Valley Primary School. She went for her Ordinary Level at City High School in Kololo, Uganda in 1975 before leaving school for other interests in the same year.

== Personal life ==
Halima met her husband,Samuel Samaala Kiwanuka in 1970 in "The Black Pearls", a Ugandan drama in which they both were characters. In 1975, at the age of 15, she gave birth to her first born, Hemdee Kiwanuka. In a period of one and half years after the birth of the first born, she conceived her second born, Rashid Kiwanuka. In 1979, she relocated to Oklahoma City to live with her husband who had earlier settled there.

She lost her husband in 1994 in a boat cruise fire accident leaving her a widow with four children, Hemdee Kiwanuka, Rashid kiwanuka, Rachel Kiwanuka and Kristopher Kiwanuka.

== Acting ==
Halima Namakula started her career as a stage actress when she was young and in school with the group called "The Black Pearls". Namakula's acting partner, husband, and the father of her children died in 1994. Though her stage name is Halima Namakula, she sometimes referred to as "the mother of all artists". In the 1990s after the death of her husband, Namakula relocated back to her home country and continued on with her acting, joining a TV soap opera, “That's Life Mwattu”, as Michelle.

== Humanitarian efforts ==
Halima Namakula is the founding member of Women At Work International, a non-government organization that helps to take commercial sex workers off the streets by creating job opportunities for them.

== Discography ==
Since 1999 Halima Namakula has released five studio albums: and they were all done under her own record label, No-End Entertainment.

=== Albums ===
- 1999 Ekimbeewo
- 2000 Tonkutula
- 2001 Kyama Kyange
- 2004 Cheza aka Sambagala
- 2008 Ntuse Jendaga

=== Singles ===
Music videos:

- Ekimbeewo
- Tonkutula
- Omusajja Waa Taxi
- Tuzina
- Cheza
- Sambagala
- Africa Yetu
- Watoto Wa Mungu
- Kibaduguda

In 2008 Namakula celebrated her 10th anniversary in the music industry right after she had what the media called "a flopped show" at Kati Kati with K-Ci & Jojo. In April 2012 Namakula released a song call "Digida" meaning dance, but this time she stayed away from the nursery rhymes she's known for.

== Controversy ==
In 2003 Halima Namakula's Radio station Beat FM was shut down by the broadcasting Council for operating without a license. In 2007 Halima Namakula was sued for sh57million Uganda shillings (about US$25,000) for running over a three-year-old child. In 2012 Halima was arrested for littering the city of Kampala with posters of her Ndimuzadde concert at Club Obligatto.

== Nominations and recognitions ==
- 2004 Kora Awards - Nominee
- 2005 Kora Awards - Nominee
- 2009 Divas Awards, presented her with a Lifetime Achievement Award.
- 2009/2010 New Vision & DFCU “Woman Achiever Of The Year Award.
- In 2009 she was Mrs. Uganda and represented Uganda in the 2009 Mrs. World pageant that took place in Vung Tau, Vietnam.

== See also ==
- Ugandan Americans
