= The Wrecker (2025 film) =

- Theatrical release poster
- Directed by: Art Camacho
- Written by: Niko Foster; Sophia Louisa Lee; James Dean Simington
- Produced by: Niko Foster; Al Bravo; Colin Bates; Eduard Osipov; Michael Pizzimenti; HemDee Kiwanuka
- Starring: Tyrese Gibson; Harvey Keitel; Mena Suvari; Niko Foster
- Cinematography: Stefan Colson
- Edited by: Tomer Almagor; Rylan Rafferty
- Music by: Mauricio Trabanino
- Production companies: Chasing Butterflies Pictures; Al Bravo Films; Premiere Entertainment Group
- Distributed by: Quiver Distribution
- Release date: October 31, 2025
- Running time: 95 minutes
- Country: United States
- Language: English

The Wrecker is a 2025 American action thriller film written by Niko Foster, Sophia Louisa Lee and James Dean Simington directed by Art Camacho, and starring Tyrese Gibson, Harvey Keitel, Mena Suvari and Foster.

The Wrecker was released in the United States on October 31, 2025.

== Cast ==
- Tyrese Gibson as Detective Boswell
- Harvey Keitel as Dante
- Niko Foster as Tony
- Mena Suvari as Cheryl
- Chad Michael Collins as Bobby
- Ego Mikitas as Dimitri
- Danny Trejo
- David Njoku
- Oleg Prudius as Marco

== Production ==
Production on the film began on February 27, 2023. The film was shot in Las Vegas.

In March 2023, it was announced that Gibson, Keitel and Foster were cast in the film. Later that same month, it was announced that Suvari, Collins, Mikitas and Trejo were cast in the film. In April 2023, it was announced that HemDee Kiwanuka would serve as a producer of the film. In September 2023, it was announced that Njoku was cast in the film.

== Release ==
The film was released in select theatres on October 31, 2025.
