= Orlando Film Festival =

- Location: Orlando, Florida, U.S.
- Established: 2005
- Language: International
- Website: https://www.offvirtual.com/

The Orlando Film Festival is an annual film festival held in Orlando, Florida, for independent filmmakers to showcase their work. The festival attracts upwards of 300 entries from filmmakers in more than 30 countries every year. The festival culminates in an award ceremony presenting over 40 filmmaking and screenwriting awards, with a combined value of prizes and in-kind services estimated at more than $1 million.

== History ==
The festival was established in 2005and is open to film of all lengths and genres, including experimental, narrative, animation, documentary and genre hybrids.
