= Stuart Townsend =

Irish actor

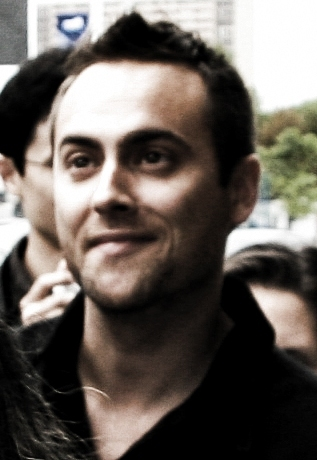
- Townsend in 2008
- Born: 15 December 1972 (age 53); Howth, County Dublin, Ireland
- Occupation: Actor
- Years active: 1993–present
- Partner: Charlize Theron (2001–2009)
- Children: 2
- Father: Peter Townsend
- Relatives: Hugo Townsend (half-brother)

Stuart Townsend (born 15 December 1972) is an Irish actor. He portrayed Lestat de Lioncourt in the film adaptation of Anne Rice's Queen of the Damned (2002), and Dorian Gray in The League of Extraordinary Gentlemen (2003). He also directed the film Battle in Seattle (2007), but is known most for being fired as Aragorn in Peter Jackson's The Lord of the Rings (film series).

== Early life and career ==
Townsend was born in Howth, County Dublin, the son of Lorna Hogan, an Irish model, and Peter Townsend, an English professional golfer. His younger brother, Dylan, is also an actor.

Stuart attended the Gaiety School of Acting, Dublin, and made his non-professional stage debut in its 1993 production of Colin Teevan's Tear Up The Black Sail. The following year he made his professional stage debut in True Lines, directed by John Crowley, which opened in Kilkenny, before moving to the Dublin Theatre Festival and on to the Bush Theatre in London. His early film roles were in Irish short films, including Godsuit and Summertime, before landing a role in the feature length film, Trojan Eddie, a 1996 Anglo-Irish co-production. In 1997 he starred in the British film, Shooting Fish.

With his portrayal of a seducer in the title role of About Adam, Townsend gained exposure in the United States. He briefly returned to the London stage in 2000, in the Tennessee Williams play Orpheus Descending, starring as Val Xavier, alongside Helen Mirren as Lady Torrance, before landing roles in several major films. He appeared in Queen of the Damned as the vampire Lestat de Lioncourt, and in The League of Extraordinary Gentlemen as Dorian Gray. Townsend was hired to play the part of Aragorn in The Lord of the Rings film trilogy, but was replaced by Viggo Mortensen the day before principal photography began. According to Townsend:

I was there rehearsing and training for two months, then was fired the day before filming began. After that I was told they wouldn't pay me because I was in breach of contract due to not having worked long enough. I had been having a rough time with them, so I was almost relieved to be leaving until they told me I wouldn't be paid. I have no good feelings for those people in charge, I really don't. The director wanted me and then apparently thought better of it because he really wanted someone 20 years older than me and completely different.

In 2005, he starred alongside Gabrielle Union in Night Stalker, the remake of the 1974 ABC TV series Kolchak: The Night Stalker. He portrayed Carl Kolchak, an investigative reporter looking into his wife's murder. Night Stalker was abruptly cancelled by ABC after six episodes due to bad viewing figures, with some critics reportedly saying he was too young compared to Darren McGavin in the original series. The same year, Townsend had a guest starring role on NBC's Will & Grace as Karen Walker's pansexual pastry chef who seduces her, Will Truman, and then her maid, Rosario. He also made an uncredited cameo in Æon Flux (2005). Townsend starred alongside Ryan Reynolds in Chaos Theory (2007). The same year, he made his directorial debut with Battle in Seattle, a portrayal of the WTO Ministerial Conference of 1999 which was protested by environmentalists, indigenous rights organizations, labor unions and anti-globalisation protesters. The film's cast included Charlize Theron, Ray Liotta and Woody Harrelson, but enjoyed only limited release and no blockbuster support.

Townsend was set to play Fandral in Kenneth Branagh's Thor, but was replaced in January 2010, due to unspecified creative differences. He appeared in the ABC thriller, Betrayal, the second season of Salem, and a 2017 episode of Law & Order: Special Victims Unit. In 2021, Townsend starred in the films The Martini Shot and Grace and Grit.

== Personal life ==
Townsend's father, Peter, was a golfer who played in the 1969 and 1971 Ryder Cups. He has a brother, Dylan, and sister, Chloe, from his father's first marriage to Lorna Townsend, who died in 1994 of a brain haemorrhage. Townsend has two half-siblings, Hugo and Ella, from his father's second marriage, to Swedish-born Sofia.

Stuart dated actress Charlize Theron after meeting her on the set of 2002's Trapped. The couple lived together in Los Angeles and Ireland. They said they considered themselves married without an actual marriage, with Townsend stating, "We didn't have a ceremony. I don't need a certificate or the state or the church to say otherwise. So no, there's no big official story on a wedding, but we are married.... I consider her my wife and she considers me her husband." Theron split from Townsend when they came back on day two of a planned ten-day holiday in Mexico in January 2010.

In May 2015, Townsend's brother said that Stuart had settled down in Costa Rica, where he had bought some land and was living with a woman from that country, who was expecting their second child at that time. In 2019, Townsend was living in Santa Monica with his wife and two children, and was arrested after a domestic dispute; no charges were filed.

== Filmography ==
=== Films ===
| Year | Title | Role | Notes |
|---|---|---|---|
| 1993 | Godsuit | John Slattery | |
| 1996 | Trojan Eddie | Dermot | |
| 1997 | Shooting Fish | Jez | |
| 1997 | Under the Skin | Tom | |
| 1998 | Resurrection Man | Victor Kelly | |
| 1999 | Simon Magus | Dovid Bendel | |
| 1999 | Wonderland | Tim | |
| 1999 | The Venice Project | Lark/Gippo the Fool | |
| 1999 | The Escort | Tom | |
| 2000 | About Adam | Adam | |
| 2002 | Queen of the Damned | Lestat de Lioncourt | |
| 2002 | Trapped | William Jennings | |
| 2003 | Shade | Vernon | |
| 2003 | The League of Extraordinary Gentlemen | Dorian Gray | |
| 2004 | Head in the Clouds | Guy Malyon | |
| 2005 | The Best Man | Olly Pickering | |
| 2005 | Æon Flux | Monican Rebel | |
| 2007 | Chaos Theory | Buddy Endrow | |
| 2008 | Battle in Seattle | —N/a | Writer and director only |
| 2009 | Maggie Hill | Terrence James | |
| 2013 | A Stranger in Paradise | Paul | |
| 2021 | Grace and Grit | Ken Wilber | |
| 2021 | Christmas at Castle Hart | Earl Aidan Hart | |
| 2021 | Apache Junction | Jericho Ford | |
| 2023 | The Martini Shot | Philip | |

Key
| † | Denotes films that have not yet been released |

=== Television ===
| Year | Title | Role | Notes |
|---|---|---|---|
| 1995 | Summertime | Andrew | Main role |
| 2005 | Will & Grace | Edward the pastry Chef | 1 episode |
| 2005 | Night Stalker | Carl Kolchak | Main role |
| 2005–2009 | Robot Chicken | Announcer, Lucky Charms Leprechaun, Ron Weasley | 4 episodes |
| 2011–2012 | XIII: The Series | XIII | Main role |
| 2013 | Betrayal | Jack McAllister | Series regular |
| 2015 | Elementary | Del Gruner | 2 episodes |
| 2015 | Salem | Dr. Samuel Wainwright | 7 episodes |
| 2017 | Law & Order: Special Victims Unit | Declan Trask | Guest |
| 2025 | Shetland | Ed Tulloch | Guest |

== Awards and nominations ==
| Year | Group | Award | Result | Notes |
|---|---|---|---|---|
| 1998 | Fantafestival | Best Actor | Won | Resurrection Man |
| 2003 | Irish Film and Television Awards | Best Actor in a Film | Nominated | People's Choice Award |
| 2008 | Irish Film and Television Awards | Best Actor in a Film | Nominated | Battle in Seattle |
| 2013 | WorldFest | Best Actor | Won | XIII: The Series |
