= Mickey Rourke filmography =

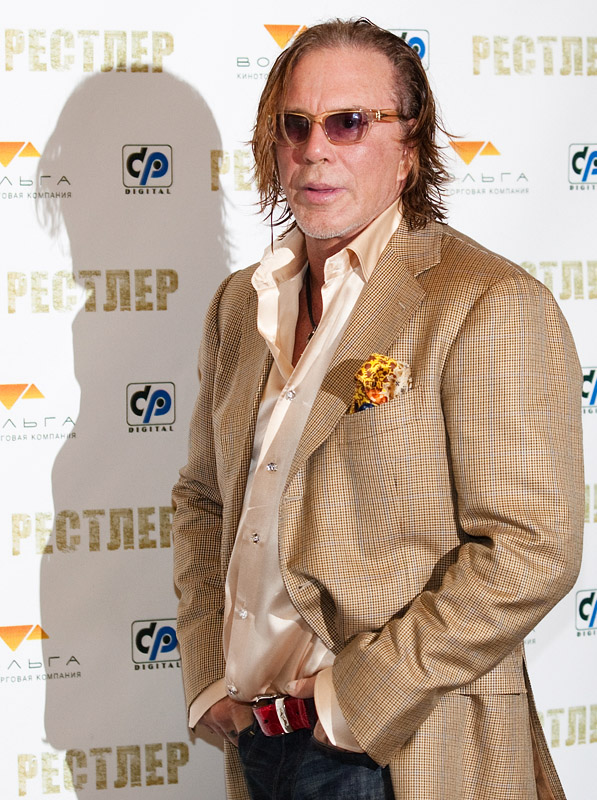
Mickey Rourke

This is a filmography of Mickey Rourke. This list includes information about films starring Mickey Rourke, notes, awards, his television works, trivia, highest-grossing films, critical acclaim of Rourke's films, shows in which he appeared, and roles he turned down among other things. It also provides information about other work and previous collaborations of Rourke.

Mickey Rourke began his career in the film 1941, directed by Steven Spielberg. Later, Rourke starred in several television films and made brief appearances in feature films. He made his breakthrough performance in the film Diner. Later, his career continued with popular films such as 9½ Weeks, The Pope of Greenwich Village, Rumble Fish, Year of the Dragon, Barfly, Angel Heart and many more. Rourke also starred in a film about Francis of Assisi called Francesco. In the early 1990s, he returned to boxing and didn't star in many films. He also turned down many roles that proved to be fortuitous for other actors. In the 2000s, he returned to prominence and won a Saturn Award for his performance in Sin City. Rourke has worked with well-known actors including Jack Nicholson, Robert De Niro and Christopher Walken.

Rourke has starred in theatrically-released films, direct-to-video films, and made-for-television films. He also wrote some of his films under the name "Sir" Eddie Cook.

== Film ==
Key
†	Denotes films that have not yet been released

Year	Title	Role	Director(s)	Notes
1979	1941	Pvt. Reese	Steven Spielberg	
1980	Heaven's Gate	Nick Ray	Michael Cimino	
1980	Fade to Black	Richie	Vernon Zimmerman	
1981	Body Heat	Teddy Lewis	Lawrence Kasdan	
1982	Diner	Robert "Boogie" Sheftell	Barry Levinson	
1983	Eureka	Aurelio D'Amato	Nicolas Roeg	
1983	Rumble Fish	The Motorcycle Boy	Francis Ford Coppola	
1984	The Pope of Greenwich Village	Charlie Moran	Stuart Rosenberg	
1985	Year of the Dragon	Captain Stanley White	Michael Cimino	
1986	9½ Weeks	John Gray	Adrian Lyne	
1987	Angel Heart	Harold R. "Harry" Angel	Alan Parker	
1987	Barfly	Henry Chinaski	Barbet Schroeder	
1987	A Prayer for the Dying	Martin Fallon	Mike Hodges	
1988	Homeboy	Johnny Walker	Michael Seresin	Also writer
1989	Francesco	Francesco	Liliana Cavani	
1989	Johnny Handsome	John "Johnny Handsome" Sedley / Johnny Mitchell	Walter Hill	
1989	Wild Orchid	James Wheeler	Zalman King	
1990	Desperate Hours	Michael Bosworth	Michael Cimino	
1991	Harley Davidson and the Marlboro Man	Harley Davidson	Simon Wincer	
1992	White Sands	Gorman Lennox	Roger Donaldson	
1994	F.T.W.	Frank T. Wells	Michael Karbelnikoff	Also writer
1995	Fall Time	Florence Nightingale	Paul Warner	
1996	Bullet	Butch "Bullet" Stein	Julien Temple	Also writer and music supervisor
1996	Exit in Red	Ed Altman	Yurek Bogayevicz	Direct-to-video
1997	Double Team	Stavros	Tsui Hark	
1997	Love in Paris	John Gray	Anne Goursaud	Direct-to-video
1997	The Rainmaker	J. Lyman "Bruiser" Stone	Francis Ford Coppola	
1998	Buffalo '66	The Bookie	Vincent Gallo	
1998	Thursday	Detective Kasarov	Skip Woods	
1998	Point Blank	Rudy Ray	Matt Earl Beesley	Direct-to-video
1999	Shades	Paul S. Sullivan	Erik Van Looy	
1999	Out in Fifty	Jack Bracken	Scott Leet & Bojesse Christopher	Direct-to-video
2000	Animal Factory	Jan the Actress	Steve Buscemi	
2000	Get Carter	Cyrus Paice	Stephen Kay	
2001	The Pledge	Jim Olstad	Sean Penn	
2001	The Hire: The Follow	Husband	Wong Kar-wai	Short film
2001	Picture Claire	Eddie	Bruce McDonald	
2001	They Crawl	"Tiny" Frakes	John Allardice	Direct-to-video
2002	Spun	The Cook	Jonas Åkerlund	
2003	Masked and Anonymous	Edmund	Larry Charles	
2003	Once Upon a Time in Mexico	Billy Chambers	Robert Rodriguez	
2004	Man on Fire	Jordan Kalfus	Tony Scott	
2005	Sin City	Marv	Robert Rodriguez & Frank Miller	
2005	Domino	Ed Moseby	Tony Scott	
2006	Stormbreaker	Darrius Sayle	Geoffrey Sax	
2008	Killshot	Armand "The Blackbird" Degas	John Madden	
2008	The Informers	Peter	Gregor Jordan	
2008	The Wrestler	Robin Ramzinski / Randy "The Ram" Robinson	Darren Aronofsky	
2010	13	Patrick Jefferson	Géla Babluani	
2010	Iron Man 2	Ivan Vanko / Whiplash	Jon Favreau	
2010	The Expendables	"Tool" Ross	Sylvester Stallone	
2010	Passion Play	Nate Granzini	Mitch Glazer	
2011	Immortals	King Hyperion	Tarsem Singh	
2012	Black November	Tom Hudson	Jeta Amata	
2012	The Courier	Maxwell	Hany Abu-Assad	Direct-to-video
2013	Java Heat	Malik	Conor Allyn	
2013	Dead in Tombstone	Lucifer	Roel Reiné	Direct-to-video
2013	Generation Iron	Narrator	Vlad Yudin	Voice; documentary
2014	Sin City: A Dame to Kill For	Marv	Robert Rodriguez & Frank Miller	
2015	Ashby	Ashby Holt	Tony McNamara	
2015	Skin Traffik	Vogal	Ara Paiaya	Direct-to-video
2015	War Pigs	Major A.J. Redding	Ryan Little	Direct-to-video
2015	Blunt Force Trauma	Zorringer	Ken Sanzel	Direct-to-video
2016	Swap	Professor Clarence Peterson	Timothy Woodward Jr.	Direct-to-video
2018	Tiger	Frank Donovan	Alister Grierson	
2018	Nightmare Cinema	The Projectionist	Mick Garris	Wraparound: "The Projectionist"; also co-executive producer
2018	Bob Lazar: Area 51 & Flying Saucers	Narrator	Jeremy Corbell	Voice; documentary
2019	Berlin, I Love You	Jim	Til Schweiger	Segment: "Love is in the Air"
2019	Night Walk	Gary	Aziz Tazi	
2020	Adverse	Kaden	Brian Metcalf	
2020	Girl	Sheriff	Chad Faust	
2020	The Legion	General Corbulo	José Magán	Direct-to-video
2021	Take Back	Patrick / Jack	Christian Sesma	Direct-to-video; also executive producer
2021	Man of God	Paralyzed Man	Yelena Popovic	
2022	The Commando	Johnny	Asif Akbar	Direct-to-video; also executive producer
2022	Warhunt	Major Johnson	Mauro Borrelli	Direct-to-video
2022	Section Eight	Earl Atherton	Christian Sesma	Direct-to-video
2023	Hunt Club	Virgil	Elizabeth Blake-Thomas	Direct-to-video
2023	The Palace	Bill Crush	Roman Polanski	
2023	Murder Motel	Dino	Paul Tully	
2023	21 Rubies	Mickey Mandovanis	Ciprian Mega	
2024	Jade	Turk	James Bamford	
2024	Murder at Hollow Creek	Ruslan Petrovic	David Lipper	
2024	Not Another Church Movie	The Devil	Johnny Mack	
2025	Devil's Play	Reverend Beau Jackson	Ben Charles Edwards	
2025	The Roaring Game	The Plow King	Tom DeNucci	
2026	Bring the Law	Gargos	Scout Taylor-Compton	
2026	3 Days Rising	Willy T	Craig Cukrowski	
TBA	A Walking Miracle †	Jack	Daniel Baldwin	Post-production
TBA	National Lampoon's Hollywood Hustle †	Himself	Mike Hatton	Post-production
TBA	Ave U †	Uno	Gino Donatelli	Post-production

== Television ==
Year	Title	Role	Director	Notes
1980	City in Fear	Tony Pate	Jud Taylor	Television film
1980	Act of Love	Joseph Cybulkowski	Jud Taylor	Television film
1980	Rape and Marriage: The Rideout Case	John Rideout	Peter Levin	Television film
1981	Hardcase	Perk Dawson	Lee H. Katzin	Television pilot
1993	The Last Outlaw	Graff	Geoff Murphy	Television film
1998	Thicker Than Blood	Father Frank Larkin	Richard Pearce	Television film
1999	Shergar	Gavin O'Rourke	Denis C. Lewiston	Television film
2017	Dice	Himself	Jay Karas	Episode: "Fingerless"
2020	The Masked Singer	Himself	—N/a	Contestant; 2 episodes
2025	Celebrity Big Brother	Himself	—N/a	Housemate; series 24

== Video games ==
Year	Title	Voice role	Notes
2004	Driver 3	Charles Jericho	
2005	True Crime: New York City	Terrence Higgins	
2009	Rogue Warrior	Richard Marcinko	

== Awards and nominations ==
Year	Award	Nomination	Film	Result
1983	Boston Society of Film Critics Award	Best Supporting Actor	Diner	Won
1983	National Society of Film Critics	Best Supporting Actor	Diner	Won
1988	Independent Spirit Awards	Best Actor	Barfly	Nominated
1991	Razzie Award	Worst Actor	Desperate Hours	Nominated
1991	Razzie Award	Worst Actor	Wild Orchid	Nominated
2006	Saturn Award	Best Supporting Actor	Sin City	Won
2006	Chicago Film Critics Association	Best Supporting Actor	Sin City	Won
2006	Irish Film and Television Awards	Best International Actor	Sin City	Won
2006	Online Film Critics Society	Best Supporting Actor	Sin City	Won
2006	Satellite Award	Best Supporting Actor	Sin City	Nominated
2006	Washington D.C. Area Film Critics Association	Best Ensemble	Sin City	Nominated
2006	Critics' Choice Award	Best Ensemble	Sin City	Nominated
2006	Total Film magazine	Man of the Year	Sin City	Voted
2008	Moviefone	Sexiest Movie Couple	9½ Weeks	Voted
2008	Golden Orange Award	Honorary Award		Won
2008	Satellite Awards	Best Actor - Drama	The Wrestler	Nominated
2008	Washington D.C. Area Film Critics	Best Actor	The Wrestler	Won
2008	San Francisco Film Critics	Best Actor	The Wrestler	Won
2008	Broadcast Film Critics	Best Actor	The Wrestler	Nominated
2008	San Diego Film Critics Society	Best Actor	The Wrestler	Won
2008	Toronto Film Critics Association	Best Actor	The Wrestler	Won
2008	Chicago Film Critics Association	Best Actor	The Wrestler	Won
2008	Florida Film Critics Circle	Best Actor	The Wrestler	Won
2008	Detroit Film Critics Society	Best Actor	The Wrestler	Won
2009	Golden Globe Award	Best Actor - Drama	The Wrestler	Won
2009	Independent Spirit Award	Best Male Lead	The Wrestler	Won
2009	BAFTA Award	Best Actor	The Wrestler	Won
2009	Academy Awards	Best Male Actor	The Wrestler	Nominated
2009	Screen Actors Guild Awards	Best Male Actor	The Wrestler	Nominated
2009	Santa Barbara International Film Festival	Riviera Award	The Wrestler	Awarded
2011	MTV Movie Awards	Best Villain	Iron Man 2	Nominated

== Other works ==
Rourke made his stage debut in a revival of Arthur Miller's A View From the Bridge. He provided the mid-song rap on the David Bowie song "Shining Star (Makin' My Love)" on Bowie's album Never Let Me Down (1987) and appeared as a gangster in the music video for "Hero" by Enrique Iglesias. He appeared in a Japanese TV commercial for Suntory Reserve (early '90s), and commercials for Daihatsu, Lark, and DirecTV. He also appeared in the music video for the song "Shuttin' Detroit Down" by John Rich.

Awards
National Society of Film Critics
Preceded by Robert Preston for S.O.B.	Best Supporting Actor; 1982 for Diner	Succeeded by Jack Nicholson for Terms of Endearment
Saturn Awards
Preceded by David Carradine for Kill Bill: Volume 2	Best Supporting Actor; 2005 for Sin City	Succeeded by Ben Affleck for Hollywoodland
Golden Globe Awards
Preceded by Daniel Day-Lewis for There Will Be Blood	Best Actor – Motion Picture Drama; 2008 for The Wrestler	Succeeded by Jeff Bridges for Crazy Heart
