= Rogue Warrior =

Rogue Warrior may refer to:

- Richard Marcinko (1940-2021), former Navy SEAL and best-selling author, nicknamed "Rogue Warrior"
- Rogue Warrior (book), a book by Richard Marcinko
- Rogue Warrior (video game), a video game based on Marcinko's books, formerly Rogue Warrior: Black Razor
- Rogue Warriors, a Chinese esports organization
