= The Night Crew =

- Film poster
- Directed by: Christian Sesma
- Written by: Paul Sloan; Christian Sesma
- Produced by: Ryan Noto
- Starring: Danny Trejo; Luke Goss; Bokeem Woodbine; Chasty Ballesteros
- Cinematography: Anthony J. Rickert-Epstein
- Edited by: Eric Potter
- Music by: Kevin Riepl
- Production companies: Digital Post Services, Inc.
- Distributed by: Premiere Entertainment Group
- Release date: August 10, 2015
- Running time: 95 mins
- Country: United States
- Language: English

The Night Crew is an American action horror thriller film directed by Christian Sesma and co-written by Paul Sloan and Sesma. The film stars Danny Trejo, Luke Goss, Bokeem Woodbine and Chasty Ballesteros.

== Plot ==
The Night Crew centers on a group of hard up bounty hunters (Wade, Ronnie, Rose and Crenshaw) who are paid to rescue a mysterious girl and bring her to America to hide and expose the illegal activities by the most powerful drug dealer. They must survive the night in a desert motel against their well trained gang. They soon realize that their fugitive, a mysterious Chinese woman (Mae), is much more than she lets on.

== Cast ==
- Luke Goss as Wade
- Bokeem Woodbine as Crenshaw
- Danny Trejo as Aguilar
- Paul Sloan as Ronnie
- Chasty Ballesteros as Mae
- Luciana Faulhaber as Rose
- Jason Mewes as Chachi
- Jacqueline Lord as Myra
- Roberto Sanchez as Gustavo
- Kaleti Williams as Chupa
- Chingo Bling as Lobo
- Don Swayze as Big Willy

== Production ==
The filming began on December 2, 2013 for eighteen days of shooting in Coachella Valley, California with mostly filming in Desert Hot Springs. On January 16, 2014, Deadline reported that the principal photography had begun in Palm Springs after new year holidays.
