= Paul Sloan =

American actor

- Occupations: Actor, screenwriter
- Years active: 1987–present

Paul Sloan is an American actor and screenwriter. He has written and acted in the films The Night Crew (2015), Vigilante Diaries (2016) and I Am Wrath (2016). He is also known for playing Jake Hunter in the 2021 film Every Last One of Them.

== Filmography ==
Year	Title	Role	Notes
1987	Made in Heaven	Young Elmo	
2002	The Scorpion King	Soldier	
2005	Choker	Hud Masters	Released on DVD in the U.S. as Disturbance and in the U.K. as B.E.I.N.G.
2006	All In	Detective Blondell	Uncredited
2007	Machine	Frank	
2007	The Prince and the Pauper: The Movie	Dante the D.P.	
2008	Stiletto	Beck	Also screenwriter
2009	The Deported	INS Agent Lopez	
2010	Shoot the Hero!	Franklin	
2010	Air	Engineer	
2011	L.A., I Hate You	Jake Tanner	
2011	Yellow Rock	Johnson	
2015	The Night Crew	Ronnie	Also screenwriter
2015	Thunderland	Oats	TV movie
2016	Vigilante Diaries	The Vigilante	Also screenwriter and executive producer
2016	I Am Wrath	Lemi K	Also screenwriter
2018	Unorganized Crime	Jimmy	TV movie
2018	Green Book	Copa Maître D' Carmine	
2018	Blood, Sweat and Terrors	Sid	Segment "Empire of Dirt"; Also screenwriter of said segment
2019	Nation's Fire	Bailey	
2019	Secret Obsession	Jim Kahn	
2019	The Murder of Nicole Brown Simpson	Profiler Ressino	
2019	Black Antenna	Alpha	Also screenwriter
2020	Paydirt	Tony	
2020	Songbird	Boomer	
2021	Take Back	Dwayne	
2021	Every Last One of Them	Hunter	Also executive producer
2022	Section Eight	Roland Brunner	
2022	The Greatest Beer Run Ever	CIA Agent	
2023	Outlaw Johnny Black	Eddie	
2024	Lights Out	Detective Kincaid	
