= Red cell =

Red cell may refer to:

- Red blood cell, a type of cell in the blood that transports oxygen
- Red Cell, a term in US government parlance for teams that test the effectiveness of tactics
- "Red Cell" (NCIS), an episode in the TV series NCIS
- Red Cell, a prominent terrorist group in the TV series La Femme Nikita (TV series)
