= Section Eight (film) =

- Directed by: Christian Sesma
- Written by: Chad Law; Josh Ridgway
- Produced by: Brandon Burrows
- Starring: Ryan Kwanten; Dolph Lundgren; Dermot Mulroney; Scott Adkins; Mickey Rourke
- Cinematography: A.J. Rickert-Epstein
- Edited by: Eric Potter
- Music by: John Roome
- Production company: Firebrand
- Distributed by: RLJE Films; AMC+
- Release date: September 23, 2022
- Running time: 98 minutes
- Country: United States
- Language: English
- Budget: $5,000,000

Section Eight (also known as Section 8) is a 2022 American action film directed by Christian Sesma and starring Ryan Kwanten, Dolph Lundgren, Dermot Mulroney with Scott Adkins, Mickey Rourke, and Justin Furstenfeld.

== Plot ==
During the US war in Afghanistan, a Marine platoon is ambushed by the Taliban, leaving only Jake Atherton and his commanding officer Captain Tom Mason as survivors. After being discharged, Jake works as a mechanic in an auto-shop owned by former gang member Earl. After Jake dispatches a group of Mexican gangsters who come to collect a debt Earl owes them, the gangsters slaughter his family in retaliation.

Jake enters the nightclub where the gang members gather and kills them all. Before he is executed, the leader of the gang "Fresh" tells Jake that someone forced them to kill his family.

Jake is extricated from prison by Mason to be recruited by a man named Sam Ramsey for a secret organization called Section 8, which is sanctioned to "eliminate any threats, anywhere in the world."

He is sent to eliminate Alejandro Castillo, but lets two women live, angering Ramsey as he believes he could compromise the mission. He hesitates when he is sent on a mission to kill a state senator after he says he has a family, Ajax kills the senator instad, leading Ramsey to place a hit on Jake.

Jake meets his chief Tom Mason, who explains that the real Section 8 was disbanded in the 1990s and this Section 8 is a hoax. Ramsey sends his enforcer Locke after Jake, who escapes to Earl's shop and sets up a defensive position expecting an attack. Ramsey's men attack, but Jake repels them and attempts to escape, although he is eventually captured by Ramsey, who reveals that he paid Fresh to eliminate Jake's family to motivate him into joining the newly created Section 8. Tom helped Ramsey bring him in, but reveals that he secretly acted as a government informant to help bring down Section 8 and helps Jake escape, and Jake shoots and kills Ramsey. He turns down another government job from US General Martin Savoy.

Jake returns to his apartment but is attacked by Locke, and after a brutal fight, kills him, eliminating the final threat to his life. He gets on a bus to go back to prison, but after seeing a mother and son on the bus, he decides to take the job and calls Savoy, who welcomes him to Section 9.

== Cast ==
- Ryan Kwanten as Jake Atherton
- Dolph Lundgren as Captain Tom Mason
- Dermot Mulroney as Sam Ramsey
- Scott Adkins as Leonard Locke
- Mickey Rourke as Earl Atherton
- Robert LaSardo as "Fresh"
- Maurice Compte as US Attorney General Martin Savoy
- Geoffrey Blake as Senator Jim Graham
- Jessica Medina as Miss Martinez
- Justin Furstenfeld as Ajax Abernathy
- Dan Matteucci as FBI Agent
- Tracy Perez as Liza Mueller
- Kimi Alexander as Ashton Atherton
- Noah Alexander Sosnowski as Weston Atherton
- Mary Christina Brown as Agent Morrow
- Paul Sloan as Roland Brunner
- Stephen Cyrus Sepher as Edward Grayson
- Robert Laenen as Enod Bacharav
- Zachary Michael Cruz as Landon

== Production ==
=== Casting ===
The casting of Lundgren, Adkins and Kwanten was announced on October 20, 2021. The casting of Mulroney and Furstenfeld was announced on October 29, 2021. The casting of Rourke was announced in November 2021.

== Release ==
=== Theatrical ===
In July 2022, it was announced that RLJE Films and AMC+ acquired the rights to the film, which was released on September 23, 2022.

== Reception ==
=== Critical response ===
On the review aggregator website Rotten Tomatoes, 33% of 15 critics' reviews are positive.
