= Every Last One of Them =

- Official release poster
- Directed by: Christian Sesma
- Written by: Chee Keong Cheung; Alistair Cave; Matthew Thomas Edwards; Christian Sesma
- Produced by: Mike Hatton; Michael Walker; Christian Sesma
- Starring: Paul Sloan; Jake Weber; Taryn Manning; Mike Hatton; Michael Madsen; Richard Dreyfuss
- Cinematography: Anthony J. Rickert-Epstein
- Edited by: Eric Potter
- Music by: Nima Fakhrara; Scott Hedrick
- Production companies: 101 Films International; Head Gear; Seskri Film; Ton of Hats
- Distributed by: Saban Films
- Release date: October 22, 2021 (United States)
- Country: United States
- Language: English

Every Last One of Them is a 2021 American action thriller film directed by Christian Sesma, and starring Paul Sloan, Jake Weber, Taryn Manning, Mike Hatton, Michael Madsen and Richard Dreyfuss.

It was released in the United States on October 22, 2021, by Saban Films.

The film received universally negative reviews upon release, with Manning being nominated for Worst Supporting Actress at the 42nd Golden Raspberry Awards.

== Premise ==
A former Black Ops soldier searching for his missing daughter uncovers a conspiracy involving a web of corruption in a small town in California. His daughter, a drug addict, was given an overdose by the son of the corruption linchpins, he takes revenge on all concerned.

== Cast ==
- Richard Dreyfuss as Murphy
- Taryn Manning as Maggie
- Jake Weber as Nichols
- Mike Hatton as Bartlett
- Michael Madsen as Bill
- Paul Sloan as Jake Hunter
- Brian Hayes Currie as Stone
- Nick Vallelonga as Victor
- Mary Christina Brown as Kim
- Claire Kniaz as Melissa
- Viktoriya Dov as Jade

== Production ==
The film was shot in Coachella, California.

== Release ==
The film was released in theaters and on demand and digital platforms on October 22, 2021.

== Reception ==
Leslie Felperin of The Guardian awarded the film one star out of five. Jeffrey Anderson of Common Sense Media also awarded the film one star out of five.

== Accolades ==
Year	Award	Category	Nominee	Result	Ref.
2022	Golden Raspberry Awards	Worst Supporting Actress	Taryn Manning	Nominated	
