= Sweetwater (2023 film) =

Film by Martin Guigui

- Theatrical release poster
- Directed by: Martin Guigui
- Written by: Martin Guigui
- Produced by: Josi W. Konski; Tim Moore; Dahlia Waingort Guigui; Darren Moorman
- Starring: Everett Osborne; Cary Elwes; Jeremy Piven; Jim Caviezel; Eric Roberts; Richard Dreyfuss; Kevin Pollak
- Cinematography: Massimo Zeri
- Edited by: Eric Potter
- Music by: Jeff Cardoni; Martin Guigui
- Production companies: Sunset Pictures; Reserve Entertainment
- Distributed by: Briarcliff Entertainment
- Release date: April 14, 2023
- Running time: 119 minutes
- Country: United States
- Language: English
- Budget: $8 million
- Box office: $541,633

Sweetwater is a 2023 American biographical sports film about Nat Clifton, the first African-American to sign a contract with the National Basketball Association (NBA). Written and directed by Martin Guigui, it stars Everett Osborne as Clifton, with Cary Elwes, Jeremy Piven, Richard Dreyfuss, and Kevin Pollak in supporting roles.

The film was released on April 14, 2023, by Briarcliff Entertainment. At the 55th NAACP Image Awards the film was nominated for Outstanding Independent Motion Picture.

== Premise ==
Nat "Sweetwater" Clifton is the main attraction of the Harlem Globetrotters team, under the guidance of their owner and coach, Abe Saperstein. As Ned Irish, a New York Knicks executive, and their coach, Joe Lapchick, take the initiative to integrate the team with support of NBA President, Maurice Podoloff. They soon join hands with the other owners of the league and create a historic moment.

== Cast ==
- Everett Osborne as Sweetwater
- Cary Elwes as Ned Irish
- Jeremy Piven as Joe Lapchick
- Kevin Pollak as Abe Saperstein
- Richard Dreyfuss as Maurice Podoloff
- Jim Caviezel as a sports writer
- Emmaline as Jeanne Staples
- Eric Roberts as Judd
- Ernest Harden Jr. as Will Robinson
- Robert Ri'chard as Pop
- Kevin Daley as Goose
- Liam Risinger as Richard
- Gary Clark Jr. as T-Bone
- Mike Starr as Eddie Gottlieb
- Jim Meskimen as a desk clerk
- Ian Fisher as Mo
- Bobby Portis as Earl Lloyd

== Production ==
In December 2006, it was reported that Martin Guigui had been working on a biopic project about the career of Nat Clifton for the last ten years. The project by Sunset Pictures was reported by Variety to begin production in April 2007 with Guigui directing from a screenplay he wrote. Henry Simmons was attached to play Nat Clifton and Richard Dreyfuss to portray Abe Saperstein, the owner and founder of the Harlem Globetrotters. Romeo Miller had also signed on to play a younger Clifton. Principal photography was set take place in the San Francisco Bay area and New York City that summer. The Great Recession caused a delay production and by April 2009 filming was expected to start in Winnipeg. Two Lagoons and Astra Blue Media were then attached to co-produce, along with additional cast members of Mira Sorvino, Kevin Pollak, James Caan and Smokey Robinson.

By July 2014, some cast members had been replaced. Wood Harris replaced Simmons as Nat Clifton, Nathan Lane would play Saperstein and James Caan as Ned Irish. Brian Dennehy, Patrick Warburton and Ludacris were all attached to star in undisclosed roles. The production budget was reported to be $10 million and filming was expected to begin in New York in late 2014.

Production was subsequently completed by October 2022, with Pollak as Saperstein, Dreyfuss as Maurice Podoloff, Cary Elwes as Irish, Jeremy Piven as Joe Lapchick. Gary Clark Jr and Bobby Portis make cameos. Guigui and Jeff Cardoni composed the film's score.

== Release ==
Sweetwater was released by Briarcliff Entertainment on April 14, 2023. The soundtrack album was released by Candid Records on the film's opening day.

== Reception ==
=== Box office ===
Released alongside Renfield, Mafia Mamma, The Pope's Exorcist and Suzume, the film earned $125,000 in its first day and went to debut on $351,010 from 1,204 theatres, finishing 13th at the box office.

=== Critical reception ===
On the review aggregator website Rotten Tomatoes, 26% of 19 critics' reviews are positive, with an average rating of 4.8/10. Audiences polled by PostTrak gave the film a 62% positive score, with 46% saying that they would recommend it.

== See also ==
- List of basketball films
