= Paydirt (film) =

- Film poster
- Directed by: Christian Sesma
- Written by: Christian Sesma
- Produced by: Jack Campbell; Luke Goss; Mike Hatton; Christian Sesma
- Starring: Luke Goss; Val Kilmer
- Cinematography: Stefan Colson
- Edited by: Eric Potter
- Music by: Nima Fakhrara
- Production companies: Octane Entertainment; Tons of Hats; Seskri Productions
- Distributed by: Uncork'd Entertainment
- Release date: August 7, 2020
- Running time: 85 minutes
- Country: United States
- Language: English

Paydirt is a 2020 American crime thriller film written and directed by Christian Sesma and starring Luke Goss and Val Kilmer.

== Premise ==
Criminal gang leader Damien Brooks is recently out on parole. He was caught during a drug bust gone awry ten years ago. He reconnects with his old crew to find the cash they stole and buried as a result of that DEA bust. However, they are being monitored by Sheriff Tucker, a retired officer who knows that Damien and the gang are still up to no good. The retired sheriff tails the gang as they embark on a search for their loot in the desert.

== Cast ==
- Luke Goss as Damien Brooks
- Val Kilmer as Sheriff Tucker
- Mike Hatton as Geoff Bentley
- Paul Sloan as Tony Brooks
- Nick Vallelonga as Leo Cap
- Mercedes Kilmer as Jamie
- Mirtha Michelle as Layla
- Mara Fimbres as Olivia
- V. Bozeman as Cici
- Ziggy David Marley as Elizabeth Brennan

== Release ==
The film was released in theaters and on VOD and digital platforms on August 7, 2020.

== Reception ==
The film has a 20% rating on Rotten Tomatoes. Anthony Ray Bench of Film Threat gave the film a 7 out of 10. Jeffrey M. Anderson of Common Sense Media awarded the film one star out of five.

Joe Leydon of Variety gave the film a negative review and wrote, "Christian Sesma’s derivative crime drama offers modest diversion for undemanding genre aficionados."
