= I Am Wrath =

2016 film by Chuck Russell

- Directed by: Chuck Russell
- Written by: Yvan Gauthier; Paul Sloan
- Produced by: Rob Carliner; Michael Mendelsohn; Richard Salvatore; Nick Vallelonga
- Starring: John Travolta; Christopher Meloni; Sam Trammell; Amanda Schull; Patrick St. Esprit; Rebecca De Mornay; Luis Da Silva
- Cinematography: Andrzej Sekuła
- Edited by: Greg D'Auria
- Music by: Haim Mazar
- Production companies: Hannibal Classics; March On Productions; Patriot Pictures; Vallelonga Productions
- Distributed by: Saban Films; 101 Films Limited; Lionsgate Films
- Release date: May 6, 2016
- Running time: 92 minutes
- Country: United States
- Language: English
- Budget: $18 million
- Box office: $309,608 (Theatrical Performance); $3.2 million (Home Market Performance); $3.5 million (Total)

I Am Wrath is a 2016 American vigilante action-thriller film directed by Chuck Russell and written by Yvan Gauthier and Paul Sloan. The film stars John Travolta, Christopher Meloni, Sam Trammell, Amanda Schull, Rebecca De Mornay, Melissa Bolona and Luis Da Silva. Principal photography on the film began on March 9, 2015, in Columbus, Ohio. The film was released on December 16, 2016, by Lionsgate, and received mostly negative reviews.

== Plot ==
During a crime wave in Columbus, Ohio, Governor John Meserve gives a press conference. There, protestors ask him about a proposed pipeline. He promises that he has commissioned an independent study of the pipeline.

Vivian Hill, the woman in charge of the study, heads to the airport to pick up her husband Stanley, who has returned from a job interview to manage a factory in California. When they arrive at their car, they notice that one tire is flat. Before Stanley can fix it, a man approaches and asks them for money. When Stanley refuses, another man stuns him with a blow to the head. The first man fatally stabs Vivian and takes her wallet. Stanley watches the men flee.

The police use Stanley's descriptions to capture Vivian's murderer, Charley 'Fly' Lawes. However, even though Stanley identifies Charley in a lineup, the corrupt cops Gibson and Walker let him go. After Vivian's funeral, an enraged Stanley goes home and throws a Bible across the room, which opens to the passage in Jeremiah 6:11, "I am filled with the wrath of the Lord." Inspired, Stanley starts to go by the name 'Wrath' and stalks Charley. Returning home, Wrath retrieves a case filled with passports, foreign currencies and weapons. He calls Dennis, a friend from Special Forces, and asks him for information about Charley and his crew. Dennis runs black ops from beneath a barbershop.

Wrath uses Dennis' intelligence to track down one of the men who attacked him at a local bar. As the man lies dying, he hints that Vivian's murder was more than just a robbery. Stanley and Dennis are photographed as they dispose of the body. Local Armenian crime lord Lemuel 'Lemi K' later sees the photograph and orders hits on Stanley and Dennis.

Stanley tracks down Lars, another man who was involved in the attack. After getting the words 'I Am Wrath' tattooed on his back, Stanley kills Lars and makes off with a bag of drugs and money. Stanley and Dennis use the bag as bait to lure Charley to the VIP room at a Korean nightclub. Before being killed, Charley reveals that Vivian's murder was ordered by Lemi K. Looking through Vivian's files, Stanley discovers that her study deemed the pipeline unsafe with an eighty-two percent chance of water contamination. Vivian was murdered to cover up the results of her study.

Lemi tracks down Stanley's daughter Abbie and her son, taking them hostage. Stanley and Dennis arrive and kill Lemi's men. Stanley questions Lemi, who reveals that the plot was organized by Meserve. Gibson and Walker then arrive and shoot Lemi dead. After being subdued by Wrath and Dennis, Gibson explains that Lemi was blackmailing Meserve using an incriminating video of the latter's son, forcing the police to keep Lemi's men out of jail. As part of the deal, Lemi agreed to do jobs for Meserve, such as the hit on Vivian. Wrath forces Gibson to drive him to Meserve's mansion, with Walker stuffed in the trunk of the car. Wrath then blows up Gibson's car, killing him while Walker escapes. Wrath infiltrates the mansion and confronts Meserve, who admits his crimes, but plans to murder Wrath to complete the cover-up. After a fight, Stanley kills Meserve. Police then arrive, instructing Stanley to drop his weapon. He instead raises Meserve's shotgun, which prompts snipers to shoot him down.

Wearing a bulletproof vest, Stanley survives and starts recovering in a hospital. However, he will be denied a jury trial and will be facing a FISA Court instead. Furthermore, he is going to be transferred out of the hospital immediately. Abbie is convinced that Wrath will be sent to someplace where he will never be seen again. Bursting into Wrath's hospital room, she gives him a farewell hug. The two officers guarding Wrath's room are then relieved by two replacement cops. One is Walker—now demoted to patrolman—who plans to assassinate Wrath. However, Abbie had slipped Stanley a gun during their hug, and he kills Walker with it as Dennis arrives to help Wrath escape. Abbie later receives a postcard from Stanley, in São Paulo, Brazil, assuring her that he is doing fine.

== Cast ==
- John Travolta as Stanley Hill / Wrath
- Amanda Schull as Abbie Hill
- Rebecca De Mornay as Vivian Hill
- Christopher Meloni as Dennis
- Sam Trammell as Detective Gibson
- Asante Jones as Detective Walker
- Patrick St. Esprit as Governor John Meserve
- Paul Sloan as Lemuel "Lemi K"
- Luis Da Silva as Charley "Fly" Lawes
- Robert Forte Shannon III as Nate Milligan
- James Logan as Lars, Tattoo Artist
- Llysa Rie as Katya
- Doris Morgado as Rosa
- Caroline Kane as Jenna
- Tommy Lafitte as Father Loomis
- Jordan Whalen as Mike
- Jayden Blake Cochran as Joey, Stanley's Grandson
- Melissa Bolona as News Reporter #1
- Adam Channing Hicks as Police Officer

== Title meaning ==
The movie title comes from Jeremiah chapter 6, verse 11. In the movie, Stanley Hill throws a Bible across the room and it opens to the page with the Old Testament and sees the verse "I am full of the wrath of the LORD, and I cannot hold it in."

== Production ==
Initially announced in September 2012, the film initially was set to star Nicolas Cage and be directed by William Friedkin. This version did not come to pass, however, and instead a new version starring John Travolta and directed by Chuck Russell was announced in February 2015.

Principal photography on the film began on March 9, 2015 in Columbus, Ohio. On March 18, 2015, filming was underway on the steps of Ohio Statehouse, and at a private home in Bexley, Ohio. Film was also shot in Cleveland and Alabama.

Paul Sloan was both the movie's screenwriter, and was in the cast, playing the role of crime lord Lemi K.

== Critical reception ==
The film-critics aggregator Rotten Tomatoes reports a rating of an 11% "rotten" rating based on 9 reviews, with a weighted average score of 3/10. Neil Genzlinger of The New York Times wrote: "'I Am Wrath' is a revenge movie, and a buddy movie, and a spiritual-crisis movie, and a political corruption movie. That's a lot of movies—too many, really, and it ends up not doing justice to any of those genres, despite star power at the top of the bill."
