= Vigilante Diaries =

2016 film directed by Christian Sesma

- Directed by: Christian Sesma
- Written by: Paul Sloan; Christian Sesma
- Produced by: Mike Hatton
- Starring: Paul Sloan; Quinton Rampage Jackson; Michael Jai White; Jason Mewes; Michael Madsen
- Cinematography: Anthony J. Rickert-Epstein
- Edited by: Eric Potter
- Music by: Kevin Reipl
- Production companies: Oscar Gold Productions; Seskri Produktionz; Ton of Hats; Vallelonga Productions
- Distributed by: CineTel Films; Anchor Bay Entertainment (DVD)
- Release date: June 24, 2016
- Running time: 107 minutes
- Country: United States
- Language: English

Vigilante Diaries is a 2016 action film directed by Christian Sesma, and starring Paul Sloan, Quinton Rampage Jackson, Michael Jai White, Jason Mewes and Michael Madsen. It was based on a 2013 web series of the same name. Reviews were mostly negative.

== Cast ==
- Paul Sloan as "The Vigilante"
- Quinton "Rampage" Jackson as "Wolfman"
- Kevin L. Walker as The Kid
- Michael Jai White as Barrington
- Jason Mewes as Michael Hanover
- Michael Madsen as Moreau
- Mike Hatton as Barry
- Noel Gugliemi as Nero
- Danny Trejo as Joe "Crazy Joe"
- James Russo as Mr. Hanover
- Arman Nshanian as Andreas
- Chasty Ballesteros as Raven
- Chavo Guerrero Jr. as "Tex-Mex"
- Jacqueline Lord as Jade
- Jessica Uberuaga as "Red"
- Mark Sherman as The Geek
- Mary Christina Brown as Swan
- Gary LeRoi Gray as Bass
- Steven Samblis as The High Roller
- Levy Tran as Kid 2.0

== Production ==
Vigilante Diaries originated as a web series which starred Jason Mewes, Paul Sloan, Kevin L. Walker, and Jacqueline Lord. Funding for the series was partially raised via the crowdfunding website Chill and the series aired on the USA Network in 2014, but was cancelled after only seven episodes. In 2014 production began on a film that would see Mewes, Walker, and Sloan returning. Other actors included Quinton Rampage Jackson, Michael Madsen, Michael Jai White, and Noel Gugliemi. Chavo Guerrero, a professional wrestler, played Tex-Mex. He was credited as Sal Guerrero.

== Release ==
The film was internationally distributed by CineTel Films. It was theatrically released in select theaters on June 24, 2016 and was released on VOD, DVD, and Blu-ray on July 5, 2016. Anchor Bay Entertainment handled the American distribution rights on DVD.

== Reception ==
The film was met with mostly negative reviews. The film received a 17% from critics on Rotten Tomatoes. A reviewer for the Los Angeles Times wrote that "Vigilante Diaries never rises above what it is: a bunch of frenetic shootouts and fight scenes unencumbered by plot." Edward Douglas of Film Journal International subtitles his review as "Writing and direction below the level of a standard videogame make for an almost unwatchable action thriller." Kam Williams of Baret News Wire reviewed the film stating, "Despite the fact that this high-octane thriller never made any sense, I must confess that it held me in its thrall from start to finish purely on the strength of the over-stimulation of its incessant visual capture."
