= Leadership Secrets of the Rogue Warrior =

Leadership Secrets of the Rogue Warrior: A Commando's Guide to Success
- First edition
- Author: Dick Marcinko and John Weisman
- Language: English
- Genre: Business book, Self-help
- Publisher: New York: Pocket Books
- Publication date: 1996
- Publication place: United States
- ISBN: 0-671-54515-9
- OCLC: 34684994
- Dewey Decimal: 658.4/092 20
- LC Class: HD57.7 .M392 1996

Leadership Secrets of the Rogue Warrior: A Commando's Guide to Success is a book by United States Navy SEAL veteran Dick Marcinko, together with ghost writer John Weisman. In the book, Marcinko looks into the world of business management. Loaded with examples, both military and civilian, the book aims to serve as a self-help guide for lower management to rise through the corporate ranks.

The book debuted at number 7 on the New York Times Business Best Seller list.
