= Ron Bergeron =

American conservationist, businessman, and philanthropist (born 1943)

Ronald Bergeron Sr.
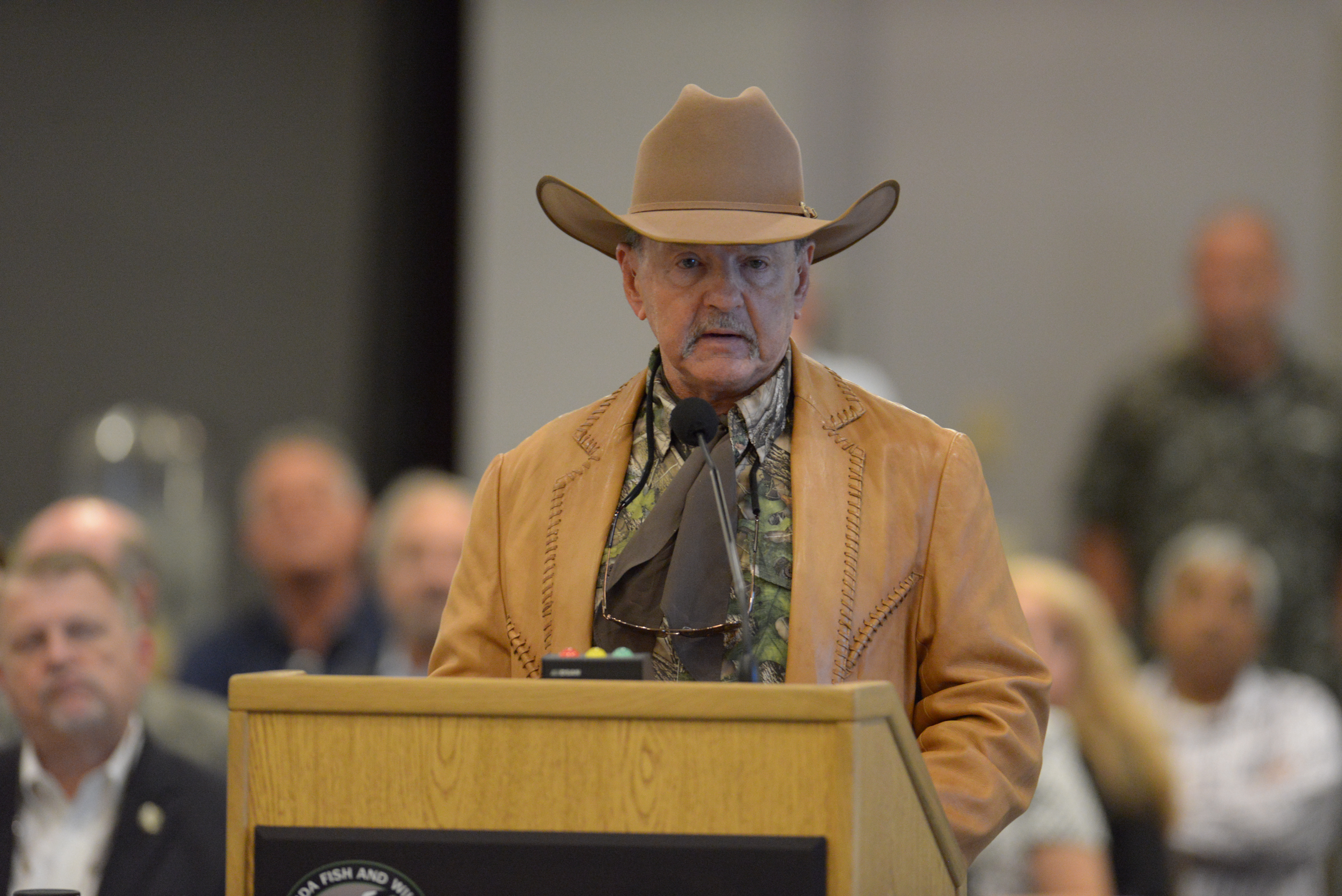
- Born: June 11, 1943 (age 83); New Orleans, LA
- Political party: Republican
- Board member of: Horatio Alger Association of Distinguished Americans South Florida Water Management District Governing Board
- Website: https://alligatorronbergeron.com/

Ronald "Alligator Ron" Bergeron Senior (born June 11, 1943) is an American conservationist, businessman, and philanthropist. He is best known for his activism surrounding the protection of the Florida Everglades. He is the namesake of the Bergeron Rodeo Grounds in Davie, Florida.

== Early life ==
At a young age, Bergeron’s grandfather took him on an airboat ride in the Everglades for the first time, and taught him to wrestle alligators, which he credits with sparking his love for the outdoors and Florida wildlife conservation.

At age eighteen, Bergeron left home with two hundred and thirty five dollars in his pocket. A year later, he began to compete professionally in rodeo, which he would continue for the next twenty years.

== Businesses ==
In 1965, Bergeron created his first business, Bergeron Land Development. In the next few years, the business would grow to over one hundred and fifty employees. Today, the company has one hundred and ninety employees.

There are multiple other businesses under the Bergeron Family of Companies, including real estate, self storage, and waste management.

== Conservation efforts ==
Bergeron served two terms as a Florida Fish & Wildlife Conservation Commissioner, appointed by both former Governor of Florida Rick Scott and current Governor Ron DeSantis. He currently serves as a member of the South Florida Water Management District Board.

Bergeron strongly considered running for Governor of Florida in 2018, but dropped out early in the race to focus on wildlife protection.

Bergeron spends time in the Everglades removing invasive Burmese pythons.

== Injury by alligator ==
In 2006, Bergeron suffered an injury to his hand after attempting to wrestle an alligator for the entertainment of guests visiting his nature preserve. The alligator rolled into nearby water with Bergeron in tow where the two struggled before the guests helped to free him.
