= Shoot the Hero! =

- Directed by: Christian Sesma
- Written by: Christian Sesma
- Produced by: Denise DuBarry; Christian Sesma
- Starring: Jason Mewes; Samantha Lockwood; Nick Nicotera; Mike Hatton; Danny Trejo
- Cinematography: Klemens Becker
- Edited by: Bruce Feagle
- Music by: Joseph Conlan
- Production companies: Blue Moxie Entertainment; Seskri Productionz
- Release date: 8 January 2010 (Palm Springs International Film Festival)
- Running time: 80 minutes
- Country: United States
- Language: English

Shoot the Hero! is a 2010 American action-comedy film directed by Christian Sesma, starring Jason Mewes, Samantha Lockwood, Nick Nicotera, Mike Hatton and Danny Trejo.

== Cast ==
- Jason Mewes as Nate
- Samantha Lockwood as Kate
- Nick Nicotera as "Fat" Smith
- Mike Hatton as "Thin" Smith
- Danny Trejo as Joe "Crazy Joe"
- Nicholas Turturro as Grant
- Paul Sloan as Franklin
- Fred Williamson as The General
- Taylor Negron as Douglas
- Brian Drolet as Hayek
- Katie Morgan as "Baby Doll"
- Annemarie Pazmino as "China Doll"

== Release ==
The film premiered at the Palm Springs International Film Festival on 8 January 2010.

== Reception ==
Variety called the film "a little strange, a little amateurish and a bit fun". Tyler Forster of DVD Talk wrote that the film is "far from flawless, but it's not too bad either".

Doug Brunell of Film Threat wrote that "when you spend a majority of the time thinking to yourself that what you are seeing on screen would never happen, you can’t help but ultimately realize it is a lost opportunity … though a slightly guilty pleasure nonetheless."
