= Take Back (film) =

American action thriller film

- Film poster
- Directed by: Christian Sesma
- Written by: Zach Zerries
- Produced by: Mike Hatton; Christian Sesma; Michael Walker
- Starring: Mickey Rourke; James Russo; Michael Jai White; Gillian White
- Cinematography: Anthony J. Rickert-Epstein
- Edited by: Eric Potter
- Music by: Nima Fakhrara; Navid Hejazi
- Distributed by: Shout! Studios
- Release date: June 18, 2021
- Running time: 89 minutes
- Country: United States
- Language: English

Take Back is a 2021 American action thriller film directed by Christian Sesma and starring Mickey Rourke, James Russo, Michael Jai White and Gillian White. The film was released in the United States on June 18, 2021.

== Plot ==
Zara (Gillian White) and Brian (Michael Jai White) are a couple living a quaint small-town life. A mysterious person from Zara's past arrives and kidnaps their daughter. Zara and Brian are forced to come to terms with Zara's past, and enlists the help of the sheriff (James Russo) to try and race to save their daughter's life before she vanishes into the sex trade.

== Cast ==
- Mickey Rourke as Patrick, Jack
- Michael Jai White as Brian
- Gillian White as Zara
- James Russo as Schmidt
- Jessica Uberuaga as Nancy
- Chris Browning as Jerry Walker
- Nick Vallelonga as Demarco

== Production ==
Principal photography wrapped in August 2020.

The film was shot in the Coachella Valley, during the COVID-19 pandemic.

== Release ==
Shout! Studios acquired North American distribution rights to the film in February 2021. The film released theatres in the United States and to video on-demand and online retailers on June 18, 2021.

== Reception ==
Reviews of the film were mostly negative, with a 20% rating on Rotten Tomatoes based on five reviews. Most reviews focused on the slow pacing and generic setup.

Phil Hoad of The Guardian awarded the film two stars out of five and wrote, "...this smalltown revenge thriller starts off well but takes a fatally long time to gather momentum."

Alan Ng of Film Threat rated the film a 6.5 out of 10 and wrote, "It’s a great film to relax at home with and enjoy a steady stream of light suspense and action… and support up-and-coming stars."
