= Out in Fifty =

- Directed by: Bojesse Christopher; Scott Leet
- Written by: Bojesse Christopher; Scott Leet
- Starring: Mickey Rourke; Bojesse Christopher; Scott Leet; Ed Lauter; Christina Applegate; Nina Offenböck
- Release date: 1999
- Country: United States
- Language: English

Out in Fifty is a 1999 independent thriller directed and written by Bojesse Christopher and starring Scott Leet and Mickey Rourke.

== Plot ==
Ray Frye is released from prison after having served a sentence for manslaughter. Jack, the husband of the woman killed, is seeking revenge.

== Cast ==
- Scott Leet as Raymond Frye
- Mickey Rourke as Jack
- Christina Applegate as Lilah
- Peter Greene as Tony Grayson

== Reception ==
TV Guide described the film as a "gritty crime thriller", while a German review stated, "Although it seems painfully boring, in several scenes there is also a “convulsive” attempt to inject something like “profundity” into the events, which always makes you laugh out loud. This reaction inevitably comes to light in a secondary plot line that revolves around the so-called “Cupid Killer”, who dresses up as a “Grim Reaper” on roller skates (!) and kills his victims with arrows from a tranquilizer gun (!!!)... By the way, the viewer never finds out why and wherefore."

FilmDienst found that it was a "mediocre thriller that wants to improve its image with a small star role for Mickey Rourke."

The Tuscaloosa News called the film "something of a modern Les Misérables".
