= Red Cell =

Military unit

Red Cell, formally designated as OP-06D, was a classified United States Navy (USN) military unit designed to test the security of USN facilities. Created and led by former US Navy SEAL Team Six commander Richard Marcinko in early 1984, Red Cell conducted staged attacks against naval installations, including ships and nuclear submarines.

== Etymology ==
"Red Teams" or "Red Cells" are United States government terms for National Security Co-ordination Teams (NSCT). These teams or units are designed to test the effectiveness of American tactics or personnel. In a war game, Red Cell can also refer to the opposing side.

The name was derived from "Red Team", a term for the opposing force in a war game by Western states during the Cold War, a reference to the predominantly red flags of Communist states (i.e., the USSR and PRC) with the Western forces being the Blue Team. The Warsaw Pact countries used the same colors, but reversed meaning—they were the Red Team and the opposing force was the Blue Team. A new Red Cell team was formed by the CIA following the 9/11 attacks to brainstorm ways to attack America. The goal of renovating the former Red Cell team was to produce better security measures to prevent them. Novelist Brad Meltzer was recruited to write plots as part of this program.

== History ==
=== Creation ===
On July 5, 1983, Commander Richard Marcinko relinquished command of SEAL Team Six to Captain Robert Gormly after leading the unit for three years. Following the change in command, Vice Admiral James "Ace" Lyons met with Marcinko in early 1984 to discuss naval complacency towards the threat of a terrorist attack. Marcinko was given the authority to form a new highly classified unit, officially designated OP-06D, that was designed to demonstrate how unprepared the Navy was against terrorism by conducting mock attacks against naval installations. Marcinko would give OP-06D the unofficial name of "Red Cell".

Red Cell was composed of fourteen members; thirteen members were former members of SEAL Team Six, while the remaining member was a Force Recon Marine. The unit was assigned to the Pentagon and reported directly to Vice Admiral Lyons, and had no single base or headquarters. According to Marcinko in his autobiography Rogue Warrior, Red Cell's unofficial headquarters was a bar named Shooter McGee's, located in Alexandria, Virginia.

=== 1985 operations ===
In the spring of 1985, Red Cell conducted a "dress rehearsal" at Naval Station Norfolk, intended to test Red Cell's capabilities. Acting as a fictional leftist guerilla group called the "Victoria Liberation Front", Red Cell members set remote-controlled dummy explosives, planted charges on a pier-side ship, "destroyed" several planes at a nearby airfield, and even attacked a convenience store located on the base. In the final security exercise, Red Cell members kidnapped the Norfolk base commander and two FBI agents acting as the defense minister of Victoria and his wife; the base commander was tied to a chair with explosives attached to it, while the FBI agents were forced to "drink water until they pissed in their pants". Every operation was recorded on film by Red Cell members.

In June 1985, Red Cell attacked Naval Submarine Base New London and Coast Guard Station New London located in New London, Connecticut. Pre-mission reconnaissance was conducted beforehand; in one notable incident, Red Cell was able to drive a small boat flying the Soviet flag close enough to Naval Submarine Base New London's Naval Submarine Support Facility (NSSF) to take photos of the dry docks and other facilities. Members of Red Cell were able to strike at the base's ordnance facility, hospital, communications center, and headquarters buildings, and were even able to plant explosives in the control room of a Los Angeles-class submarine. However, Marcinko got into an altercation with the base commander during debriefing, which resulted in the base commander writing Lyons a letter of complaint.

On Labor Day weekend in September 1985, it was discovered by Red Cell that Air Force One was being housed at Naval Station Point Mugu, while President Ronald Reagan was vacationing at his ranch in Santa Barbara. Over the course of a week, a thirteen member Red Cell team infiltrated Point Mugu, "destroyed" several F/A-18 Hornets by planting charges on them, and "destroyed" Air Force One by leaving a stolen weapons carrier loaded with 500-pound dummy bombs next to the aircraft.

==== Change of command ====
In September 1985, Vice Admiral Lyons was promoted to the rank of Admiral, and was given orders to take command of the U.S. Pacific Fleet. Lyons was replaced by Vice Admiral Donald S. Jones, who Red Cell now reported to. Marcinko would later allege in his autobiography Rogue Warrior that Lyons' promotion was a political maneuver meant to stop him from protecting Red Cell.

The team was led by Richard Marcinko until he was relieved of duty and charged with conspiracy, conflict of interest and misappropriating funds. Marcinko maintains that these were made-up allegations as part of a vendetta against him, due to anger felt at senior levels at how easily Marcinko and his team had infiltrated bases and procured top secret information from high-ranking individuals. A high-ranking Navy official cited in People magazine said there was no vendetta and that "the general take was that Red Cell was a good thing."

=== 1986 kidnapping incident ===
In March 1986, Marcinko and Red Cell traveled to Naval Weapons Station Seal Beach in Orange County, California, to conduct security exercises at the naval installation. Under the guise of a fictional terrorist group called "Nuclear Free America", Red Cell began to execute mock attacks against base defenses. Security personnel, including civilian security chief Robert D. Sheridan, at the base had been briefed in advance, but had refused to provide Red Cell access to a warehouse just inside the base as a central operations center, which antagonized Marcinko and Red Cell. Instead, Red Cell based themselves out of a local dive bar called Garf's.

On March 20, 1986, Sheridan was kidnapped from his home. Sheridan and his wife, Margaret Sheridan, had been woken by a phone call at 3:00 AM calling him in to work; although he believed the call to be a hoax, he decided to go to work anyways. After exiting his house, Sheridan was confronted by Red Cell member Frank Phillips brandishing a gun. Phillips displayed a badge, told Sheridan that this was part of the ongoing security exercises at the base, and told him to get into a car, driven by another Red Cell member, Arturo Farias. Margaret, who wasn't aware of the security exercises and had been watching Sheridan through her window, rushed out of the house and pointed her husband's .45 caliber handgun at the intruders, but was convinced by Sheridan to stand down before he and Phillips drove off.

Although the plan was for Red Cell to bring Sheridan to their hotel, Phillips and Farias decided to make their exercise "more realistic", and took him to a nearby motel in Costa Mesa, named the Don Quixote. There they were joined by two other men, Robert Holmes and Stephen Hartman, and waited for instructions from Marcinko while watching television in their motel room. Sheridan repeatedly asked to be let go, but was denied. At 5:00 PM, the SEALs received a phone call from Marcinko, who advised the SEALs to "tear him a new asshole". Following this, Farias and Phillips forcibly stripped Sheridan, handcuffed him to a chair, and put a pillowcase over his head. He was held for 30 hours and tortured: stripped, kicked, beaten, and repeatedly dunked into a flushing toilet and a bathtub filled with water. While, in theory, the kidnapping could prove a weakness, actually committing the torture served no useful purpose. Since Sheridan was not naval personnel, he sued the government afterward.
