= Rogue Warrior (book) =

1992 autobiography by Richard Marcinko

- First edition
- Author: Richard "Dick" Marcinko and John Weisman
- Subject: Richard "Dick" Marcinko
- Genre: autobiography
- Publisher: Atria Books
- Publication date: 1992
- English publication date: 1 March 1992
- Pages: xii, 336 pages
- ISBN: 0671795937
- OCLC: 24871462

Rogue Warrior is an autobiography by career US naval officer Richard "Dick" Marcinko, who spent his career struggling to win acceptance for special warfare SEAL units within the Navy establishment.

It covers the early history of the SEAL units, his participation in the Vietnam War, the Iran hostage rescue attempt in 1980 and the U.S. invasion of Grenada and the founding and early history of two United States Navy counter-terrorist units, SEAL Team SIX and Red Cell.

While commanding Red Cell, he was directed to use them to test the Navy's anti-terrorist capabilities and to expose the security weaknesses of U.S. properties around the world. During the tests, Red Cell was often able to infiltrate supposedly impenetrable, highly secured bases, nuclear submarines, ships and other "secure areas", including the Presidential plane Air Force One. In doing so, he claims to have embarrassed several superior officers, whom he accuses of involvement in his subsequent conviction for misappropriation of funds and resources under his command. Marcinko also delights in recalling the gross behavior of the SEALs, such as eating the brains of a live monkey to impress some of his Cambodian allies.

Based on the success of the book, Marcinko went on to author a series of novels placing himself as the protagonist and entitling the series Rogue Warrior. The book also spawned a 2009 video game which features Marcinko as the protagonist.
