= Mickey Rourke =

American actor (born 1952)

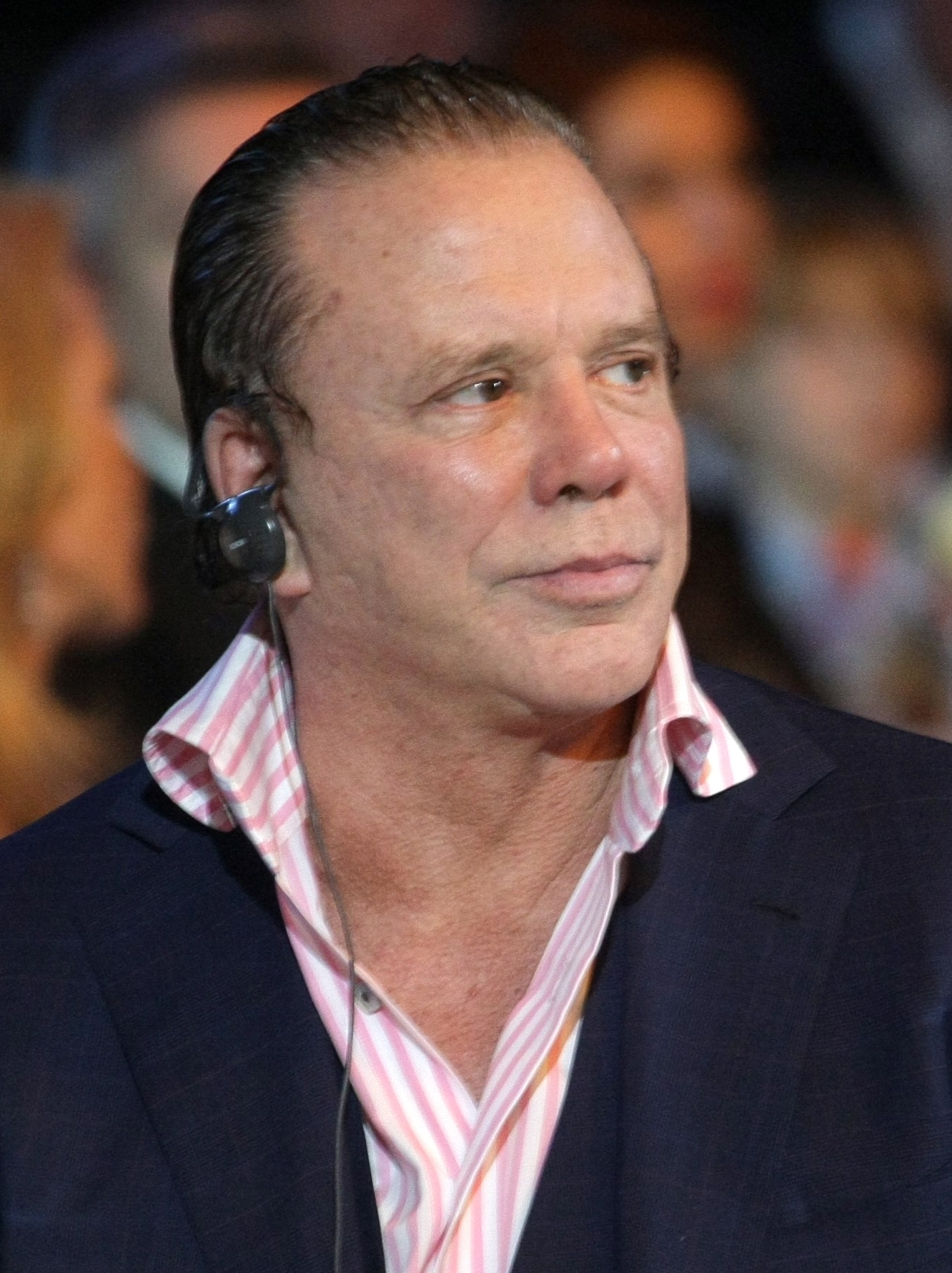
- Rourke in 2010
- Born: Philip Andre Rourke Jr. September 16, 1952 (age 74); Schenectady, New York, U.S.
- Other name: Eddie Cook
- Occupation: Actor
- Years active: Actor (1979–present); Boxer (1964–1994; 2014)
- Height: 5 ft 11 in (180 cm)
- Spouses: Debra Feuer (m. 1981; div. 1989) Carré Otis (m. 1992; div. 1998)

Philip Andre "Mickey" Rourke Jr. (/rʊərk/ ROORK; born September 16, 1952) is an American actor who has appeared primarily as a leading man in drama, action, and thriller films. In a film career spanning more than forty years, films in which he has appeared have grossed over $1.9 billion worldwide.

Rourke's film debut was a small role in 1941 (1979), but it was his performance in the well-received neo-noir Body Heat (1981) that initially garnered attention of film critics, including Roger Ebert, who called it his "breakthrough role" and the "best supporting work" in the film. He then went on to win wider acclaim and a National Society of Film Critics Award for his role in Diner (1982). He subsequently established himself as a leading man, giving lauded performances in dramas such as Rumble Fish (1983), The Pope of Greenwich Village (1984), Year of the Dragon (1985), 9½ Weeks (1986), Angel Heart (1987), Barfly (1987), and Johnny Handsome (1989). In 1991, after some critical and commercial failures, Rourke—who trained as a boxer in his youth—left acting to pursue professional boxing. After retiring from boxing in 1994, Rourke returned to acting and had supporting roles in several films such as The Rainmaker (1997), Buffalo '66 (1998), Animal Factory (2000), The Pledge (2001), Once Upon a Time in Mexico (2003), Man on Fire (2004) and Domino (2005). In 2005, Rourke made a comeback in mainstream Hollywood circles as a leading actor in the neo-noir action thriller Sin City.

His comeback culminated in his portraying aging wrestler Randy "The Ram" Robinson in the sports drama film The Wrestler (2008). For the role, Rourke won the Golden Globe Award and BAFTA Award for Best Actor, and received a nomination for the Academy Award for Best Actor. After this, Rourke appeared in several commercially successful films: Iron Man 2 (2010), The Expendables (2010) and Immortals (2011), before primarily going on to work in direct-to-video productions and independent films.

== Early life ==
Philip Andre Rourke Jr. was born on September 16, 1952, in Schenectady, New York. He has Irish and French ancestry. He was raised Catholic and still practices his faith. His father left the family when Rourke was around six years old. After his parents divorced, his mother married Eugene Addis, a Miami Beach police officer with five sons, and moved Rourke and two younger siblings to South Florida. Rourke has mentioned his stepfather was physically abusive to both him and his mother. There, he graduated from Miami Beach Senior High School in 1971.

== Boxing career ==
=== Amateur ===
"My stepfather used to crack my head just because he felt like it. He was big, very big, and mean. And he was physically abusive to my mother. I hated the f***er for hurting her, for making her afraid. For years, I wanted nothing more than to take him down. In our neighborhood, there was some community services center set up to give kids a place to go and to keep us out of trouble. That's where I first found a speed [punching] bag. To me, it represented a ticket to manhood..."

— Mickey Rourke to Ingrid Newkirk

During his teenage years, Rourke focused his attention mainly on sports. He took up self-defense training at the Boys Club of Miami. It was there that he learned boxing skills and decided on an amateur career.

At age 12, Rourke won his first boxing match as a 112-pound (51 kg) flyweight, fighting some of his early matches under the name Phil Rourke. He continued his boxing training at the famed 5th Street Gym, in Miami Beach, Florida. In 1969, Rourke, then weighing 140 pounds (63.5 kg), sparred with former World Welterweight Champion Luis Rodríguez. Rodríguez was the number one–rated middleweight (154 lb to 160 lb) boxer in the world and was training for his match with world champion Nino Benvenuti. Rourke says he received a concussion from his sparring match with Rodríguez.

At the 1971 Florida Golden Gloves, Rourke suffered another concussion in a boxing match. After being told by doctors to take a year off and rest, Rourke temporarily retired from the ring. From 1964 to 1973, Rourke compiled an amateur boxing record of 27 wins (including 12 straight knockouts), including a first-round knockout win over John Carver and decision victories over Ronnie Carter and Javier Villanueva, and three defeats.

=== Professional ===
In 1991, Rourke decided that he "had to go back to boxing" because he felt that he "was self-destructing ... [and] had no respect for [himself as] an actor". Rourke was undefeated in eight fights, with six wins (four by knockout) and two draws. He fought internationally in countries including Spain, Japan, and Germany. During his boxing career, Rourke suffered a number of injuries, including a broken nose, toe, and ribs, a split tongue, and a compressed cheekbone. He also suffered from short-term memory loss.

His trainer during most of his boxing career was Hells Angels member, actor, and celebrity bodyguard Chuck Zito. Freddie Roach also trained Rourke for seven fights. Rourke's entrance song into the ring was often Guns N' Roses' "Sweet Child o' Mine" (to which reference is made in his film The Wrestler, in which Rourke's character enters his final match of the film to the song playing over the loudspeakers). Boxing promoters said that Rourke was too old to succeed against top-level fighters. Indeed, Rourke himself admits that entering the ring was a sort of personal test: "[I] just wanted to give it a shot, test myself that way physically, while I still had time." Rourke's boxing career resulted in a notable physical change in the 1990s, as his face needed reconstructive surgery to mend his injuries.

=== Exhibition bout ===
On November 28, 2014, Rourke briefly returned to the boxing ring and fought 29-year-old Elliot Seymour in Moscow, Russia. It was Rourke's first boxing match in over 20 years. Talks of him being involved in four more matches were released by Rourke himself after the match. He won the exhibition fight in the second round by TKO. The fight is not counted in his professional record since it was an exhibition match. The opponent later stated that he threw the fight, having been promised payment to take a dive in the second round.

== Acting career ==
=== Early roles ===
In 1971, as a senior at Miami Beach Senior High School, Rourke had a small acting role in the Jay W. Jensen–directed school play The Serpent. However, Rourke's interests were geared to boxing, and he never appeared in any other school productions. Soon after he temporarily gave up boxing, a friend at the University of Miami told Rourke about a play he was directing, Deathwatch, and how the man playing the role of Green Eyes had quit. Rourke got the part and immediately became enamored with acting. Borrowing $400 from his sister, he moved to New York, working an assortment of odd jobs while studying with Actors Studio alumni Walter Lott and Sandra Seacat. It was under the latter's tutelage, Rourke later recalled, that "everything started to click." Seacat motivated Rourke to find his father, from whom he was separated for more than twenty years.

Darren Aronofsky, Rourke, and Evan Rachel Wood discussing The Wrestler

During his appearance on Inside the Actors Studio, after the release of The Wrestler, host James Lipton disclosed that Rourke had been selected to the Actors Studio in his first audition, which Elia Kazan is reported to have said was the "best audition in thirty years".

Appearing primarily in television films during the late 1970s, Rourke made his feature film debut with a small role in Steven Spielberg's 1941 (1979). He played Ritchie, Dennis Christopher's bullying and ill-fated co-worker in the 1980 slasher film Fade to Black. However, it was in 1981, with his portrayal of an arsonist in Body Heat, that Rourke first received significant attention, despite his modest time on screen. The following year, he drew further critical accolades for his portrayal as the suave compulsive gambler "Boogie" Sheftell in Barry Levinson's Diner, in which Rourke co-starred, alongside Paul Reiser, Daniel Stern, Steve Guttenberg, Tim Daly and Kevin Bacon; the National Society of Film Critics named him Best Supporting Actor that year. Soon thereafter, Rourke starred in Rumble Fish, Francis Ford Coppola's follow-up to The Outsiders.

Rourke's performance in the film The Pope of Greenwich Village alongside Daryl Hannah and Eric Roberts also caught the attention of critics, although the film was not financially successful. In the mid-1980s, Rourke earned himself additional leading roles. His role opposite Kim Basinger in the erotic drama 9½ Weeks helped him gain sex symbol status. He received critical praise for his work in Barbet Schroeder's Barfly as the alcoholic writer Henry Chinaski (the literary alter ego of Charles Bukowski), co-starring Faye Dunaway, and in Year of the Dragon, written by Oliver Stone.

In 1987, Rourke gave what is widely considered to be one of his greatest performances in Angel Heart. The film was nominated for several awards. It was somewhat controversial, owing to a sex scene involving Cosby Show cast member Lisa Bonet, who won an award for her part in the film. Although some of Rourke's work was controversial in the US, he was well received by European, and especially French audiences, who loved the "rumpled, slightly dirty, sordid ... rebel persona" that he projected in Year of the Dragon, 9½ Weeks, Angel Heart, and Desperate Hours. Director Adrian Lyne said that had Rourke died after the release of Angel Heart, he would have become a bigger phenomenon than James Dean.

In 1987, Rourke performed with David Bowie on the Never Let Me Down album. Rourke provided the mid-song rap on the song "Shining Star (Makin' My Love)". Around the same time, he also wrote his first screenplay, Homeboy, a boxing tale in which he starred. In 1989, Rourke starred in the docudrama Francesco, portraying St. Francis of Assisi. This was followed by Wild Orchid, another critically panned film, which gained him a nomination for a Razzie award (also for Desperate Hours). In 1991, he starred in the box office bomb Harley Davidson and the Marlboro Man as Harley Davidson, a biker whose best friend, Marlboro, was played by Don Johnson. In his last role before departing for the boxing ring, Rourke played an arms dealer chased by Willem Dafoe and Samuel L. Jackson in White Sands, a film noir that reviewers found stylish but incoherent.

Rourke's acting career eventually became overshadowed by his personal life and career decisions. Directors such as Alan Parker found it difficult to work with him. Parker stated that "working with Mickey is a nightmare. He is very dangerous on the set because you never know what he is going to do." In a documentary on the special edition DVD of Tombstone, actor Michael Biehn, who plays the part of Johnny Ringo, mentions that his role was first offered to Rourke. Rourke has allegedly turned down several roles in high-profile films, including 48 Hrs., Platoon, Highlander, Top Gun, Beverly Hills Cop, The Untouchables, Rain Man, The Silence of the Lambs, Pulp Fiction, and Death Proof.

=== 1990s ===
In the early 1990s, Rourke was offered and declined the role of Butch Coolidge, which later became Bruce Willis's role in Pulp Fiction. After his retirement from boxing, Rourke did accept supporting roles in several 1990s films, including Francis Ford Coppola's adaptation of John Grisham's The Rainmaker, Vincent Gallo's Buffalo '66, Steve Buscemi's Animal Factory, Sean Penn's The Pledge, and Sylvester Stallone's remake of Get Carter. Rourke also has written several films under the name Sir Eddie Cook, including Bullet, in which he co-starred with Tupac Shakur.

While Rourke was also selected for a significant role in Terrence Malick's The Thin Red Line, his part ended up on the cutting room floor. Rourke also played a small part in the film Thursday, in which he plays a crooked cop. He also had a lead role in 1997's Double Team, which co-starred martial arts actor Jean-Claude Van Damme and former NBA player Dennis Rodman. It was Rourke's first over-the-top action film role, in which he played the lead villain. During that same year, he filmed Another 9½ Weeks, a sequel to 9½ Weeks, which received only limited distribution. He ended the 1990s with the direct-to-video films Out in Fifty, Shades and television film Shergar, about the kidnapping of Epsom Derby-winning thoroughbred racehorse Shergar. Rourke has expressed his bitterness over that period of his career, stating that he came to consider himself a "has-been" and lived for a time in "a state of shame".

=== 2000–2009 ===
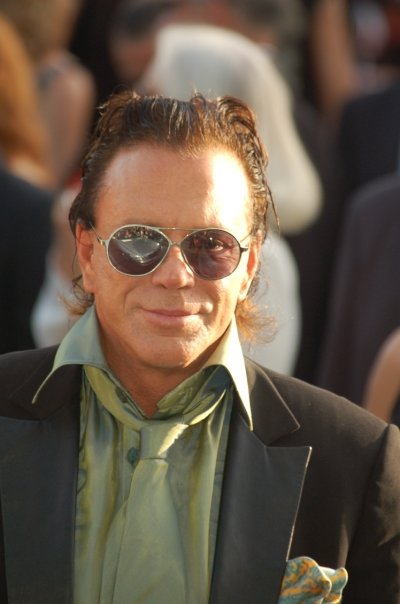
Rourke at the 2007 Cannes Film Festival

In 2001, Rourke appeared as the villain in Enrique Iglesias's music video for "Hero", which also featured Jennifer Love Hewitt. In 2002, he took the role of The Cook in Jonas Åkerlund's Spun, teaming up once again with Eric Roberts. His first collaborations with directors Robert Rodriguez and Tony Scott, in Once Upon a Time in Mexico and Man on Fire, respectively, were in smaller roles. Nonetheless, these directors subsequently decided to cast Rourke in lead roles in their next films. In 2005, Rourke made his comeback in mainstream Hollywood circles with a lead role as Marv in Robert Rodriguez's adaptation of Frank Miller's Sin City. Rourke received awards from the Chicago Film Critics Association, the IFTA, and the Online Film Critics Society, as well as Man of the Year from Total Film magazine that year. Rourke followed Sin City with a supporting role in Tony Scott's Domino alongside Keira Knightley, in which he played a bounty hunter. Rourke played the role of "The Blackbird" in an adaptation of Elmore Leonard's Killshot, and appeared as Darrius Sayle in the adaptation of the Alex Rider novel Stormbreaker.

In addition, in 2004, Rourke provided the voice for "Jericho" in the third installment of the Driver video game series. Rourke also appeared in a 40-page story by photographer Bryan Adams for Berlin's Zoo Magazine. In an article about Rourke's return to steady acting roles, entitled "Mickey Rourke Rising", Christopher Heard stated that actors Johnny Depp, Sean Penn, and Brad Pitt gave "animated praise for Rourke and his work". During a roundtable session of Oscar-nominated actors held by Newsweek, Brad Pitt cited Rourke as one of his early acting heroes along with Sean Penn and Gary Oldman.

Despite having withdrawn from acting at various points, and having made films that he now sees as a creative "sellout" (the action film Harley Davidson and the Marlboro Man), Rourke stated that "all that I have been through ...[has] made me a better, more interesting actor". Rourke's renewed interest in pursuing acting can be seen in his statement that "my best work is still ahead of me".

Rourke had a role in the film version of The Informers, playing Peter, an amoral former studio security guard who plots to kidnap a small child. In 2008, Rourke played the lead in Darren Aronofsky's The Wrestler, winner of the Golden Lion Award for Best Film at the Venice Film Festival, about washed-up professional wrestler Randy "The Ram" Robinson. Regarding first reading the screenplay, he stated that he originally "didn't care for it".

I didn't really care for the script, but I wanted to work with Darren and I kind of thought that whoever wrote the script hadn't spent as much time as I had around these kind of people and he wouldn't have spoken the way the dude was speaking. And, so Darren let me rewrite all my part and he put the periods in and crossed the T's. So once we made that change I was okay with it.

He also spoke on personal concern and hesitance of being in a film about wrestling, for he perceived it as being "pre-arranged and pre-choreographed". As he trained for the film, he developed an appreciation and respect for what real-life pro wrestlers do to prepare for the ring:

I kept getting hurt. I think I had three MRIs in two months because I wasn't landing right. These guys take several years to learn how to land and I think after I started getting hurt doing it, I started to realize these guys are really suffering and I kind of gained a respect for their sport.

He trained under former WWE wrestler Afa the Wild Samoan for the part, and has received a BAFTA award, a Golden Globe award, an Independent Spirit Award, and an Oscar nomination as Best Actor. Rourke lost the Oscar to Sean Penn, while Penn did acknowledge Rourke in his acceptance speech.

Rourke has written or co-written six scripts: Homeboy, The Last Ride, Bullet, Killer Moon, Penance and the latest, Pain. Of these, the first three were produced as films between 1988 and 1996.

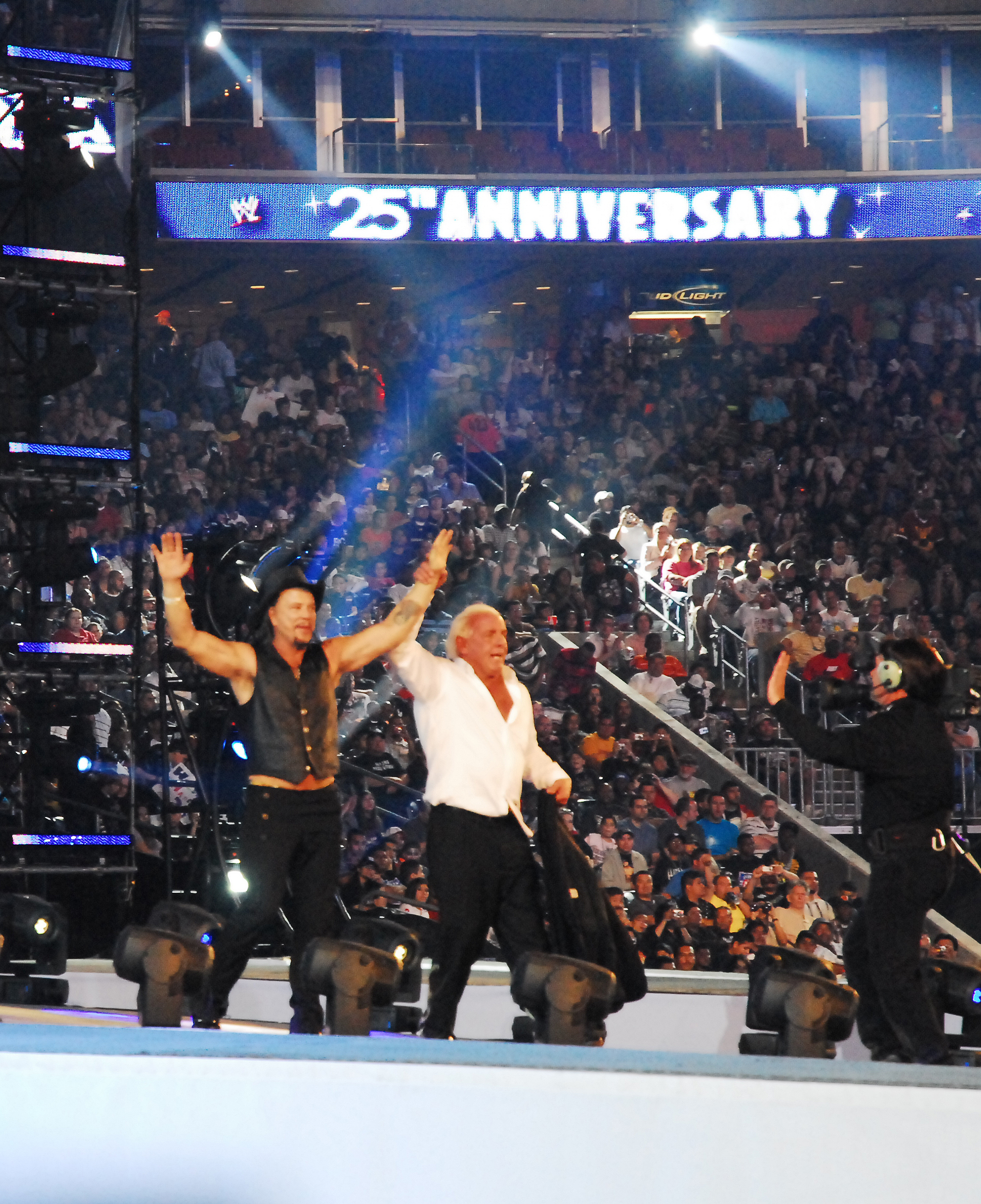
Rourke with Ric Flair at WrestleMania XXV

In early 2009, Rourke developed a small feud with WWE wrestler Chris Jericho, as part of a storyline. The storyline climaxed at WrestleMania XXV, when Rourke knocked out Jericho with a left hook after Jericho won his match against Jimmy Snuka, Ricky Steamboat, and Roddy Piper, with Ric Flair in their corner. In 2009, Rourke starred in John Rich's music video for Shuttin' Detroit Down alongside Kris Kristofferson. In 2009, he voiced protagonist US Navy SEAL Dick Marcinko in the video game Rogue Warrior.

=== 2010–present ===
In 2010, Rourke played the role of the main villain Whiplash in the film Iron Man 2. In an interview with New Zealand magazine Rip It Up magazine he revealed that he prepared for the role by visiting Russian jail inmates. In 2011, he portrayed the villainous King Hyperion in Immortals and received praise for his performance, while the film received mixed-to-positive reviews and became a box office success. He also had a minor role as Tool in Sylvester Stallone's The Expendables. Though he had little screen time, his performance was met with rave reviews and cited as one of the film's highlights.

Just before the end of the year, he confirmed on a British TV talk show that he would play Gareth Thomas in an upcoming film about the Welsh rugby star who came out as gay the previous year. As of February 2011, he began research on the film, but noted, "We're not going to make this movie until we've done all the proper research. We need to do our homework and I need to train for from nine to eleven months." In 2011, Rourke was cast in the film Java Heat as an American citizen shadowing terrorist groups in Java, Indonesia. The film was released in 2013. In 2014, he reprised his Marv role from Sin City in the sequel Sin City: A Dame to Kill For.

In 2020, Rourke competed in season four of The Masked Singer as "Gremlin" and sang "Stand by Me" by Ben E. King. After the performance, the Gremlin costume became too hot for him and he ended up unmasking himself before the audience could even vote for their favorite performer.

Rourke starred in the 2020 Canadian-American thriller film Girl in which he played a sheriff. His co-star Bella Thorne accused him of injuring her pelvis instead of hitting her knee caps as intended in the scene and claimed he was uncooperative on set, refusing to speak with crew.

In the 2021 film Man of God, which is on the life of St Nectarios of Aegina, Rourke plays the role of a paralyzed man.

In 2023, he had a role in Roman Polanski's drama film The Palace.

In April 2025, Rourke entered the British version of Celebrity Big Brother to appear as a housemate on its twenty-fourth season. In his first live appearance, he was criticized for an on-air physical action towards the show's co-host AJ Odudu, grabbing her by the waist and making her 'clearly uncomfortable', with some viewers wanting him to be taken off the show. On the third episode of the series, Rourke made openly homophobic and disparaging remarks towards housemate JoJo Siwa, and was subsequently given a formal warning by the show for his conduct. On April 12, it was announced that Rourke had been removed from the house, due to "inappropriate language and instances of unacceptable behaviour", this time toward housemates Ella Wise (unwanted sexual remark) and Chris Hughes (aggressive verbal confrontation). As of April 2025, Rourke was planning to sue ITV after only receiving £50,000 of his agreed £500,000 fee.

== Other works ==
Rourke made his stage debut in a revival of Arthur Miller's A View from the Bridge. He lent his voice to the video games Driver 3 (2004) as Charles Jericho and True Crime: New York City (2005) as Terrence "Terry" Higgins, which was his fifth and last work with actor Christopher Walken. He also appeared in a Japanese TV commercial for Suntory Reserve (early '90s) and a commercial for Daihatsu and Lark cigarettes. In 2009, Rourke voiced the character of Dick Marcinko for the biographical video game Rogue Warrior, which was released on December 1, 2009.

In 2010, he appeared in a Dutch TV commercial for Bavaria Beer.

Rourke appeared as a gangster in the music video for "Hero" by Enrique Iglesias. Actress Jennifer Love Hewitt also made an appearance in the clip.

Rourke has been the subject of two extensive biographies on his life and career Stand Alone: The Films of Mickey Rourke and Hollywood Outlaw: The Life of Mickey Rourke both were written by British author Saurav Dutt. In 2014, Dutt announced he was producing and writing a novelization inspired by an undeveloped script for a movie that Rourke wrote titled Wild Horses which was eventually released in Fall 2015.

== Personal life ==
Rourke has dated several celebrities, including Terry Farrell and Sasha Volkova. He has been married twice and does not have children. In 1981, he married Debra Feuer, whom he met on the set of TV movie Hardcase and who co-starred with him in Homeboy (1988) as his love interest. The marriage ended in 1989, with Rourke subsequently commenting that making the film 9½ Weeks "was not particularly considerate to my wife's needs." The two have remained good friends, according to an interview Feuer gave in 2009.

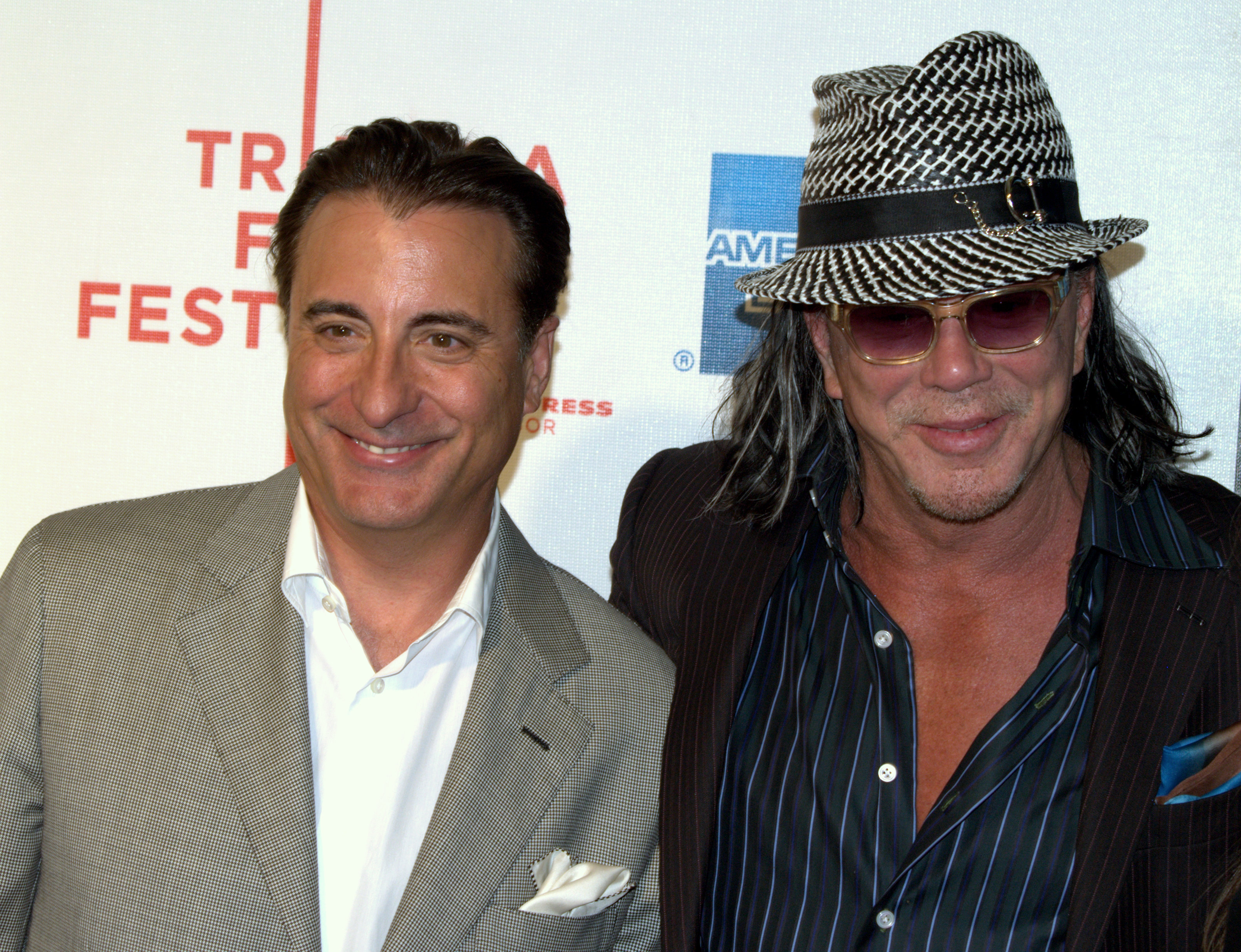
Andy Garcia and Rourke at the 2009 Tribeca Film Festival

Rourke married Wild Orchid co-star Carré Otis on June 26, 1992. In 1994, Rourke was arrested on suspicion of spousal abuse. The charges were later dropped, and the couple reconciled before starring together in Exit in Red. Their marriage ultimately ended in December 1998.

In November 2007, Rourke was arrested again, this time on DUI charges in Miami Beach.

In numerous TV and print interviews, he attributes his comeback after 14 years to his agent, David A. Unger; weekly meetings with a psychiatrist, "Steve"; a Catholic priest, Father Peter Colapietro; and his dogs. Rourke had been described as a "real good Catholic" by late friend Tom Sizemore.

From 2009 to 2015, Rourke was in a relationship with Ukrainian-born German model Anastassija Makarenko. Rourke stated during an interview with Piers Morgan on July 12, 2022, he has been single for the past 7 years. In 2023, it was reported that Rourke had begun training in Brazilian jiu-jitsu.

In early 2026, it emerged that Rourke had fallen behind with his rent, and his landlord had filed an eviction notice. A GoFundMe started without his knowledge reached its goal within two days, but Rourke was angry at the unsolicited help. Rourke eventually was evicted from his home on March 9, 2026.

=== Political views ===
In May 1989, Rourke revealed that he donated most of his £1.5 million earnings from starring in Francesco to support Provisional Irish Republican Army (IRA) member Joe Doherty's campaign to receive political asylum in the United States. Doherty was wanted by the British government for his role in the killing of Grenadier Guards officer Herbert Westmacott. After being arrested in the U.S. in 1983, Doherty's campaign became a cause célèbre as he fought an ultimately unsuccessful nine-year legal battle against being extradited. Rourke's donation was criticized by victims of IRA bombing attacks in England. Doherty was eventually deported to Northern Ireland and imprisoned, but was subsequently released under the terms of the Good Friday Agreement.

In June 2006, Rourke publicly supported U.S. President George W. Bush and American involvement in the Iraq War. In January 2009, Rourke expressed admiration for Bush in an interview with GQ magazine. In the interview, Rourke also expressed his astonishment that Islamic fundamentalists were allowed to continue their activities in Britain after the July 7 2005 London bombings.

In August 2014, Rourke came under scrutiny for purchasing and wearing a T-shirt bearing the likeness of Russian President Vladimir Putin at a time when most of the Western world was criticizing and sanctioning Russia due to the annexation of Crimea by the Russian Federation. When questioned by the press, Rourke explained: "If I didn't like him, I wouldn't buy the T-shirt, believe me. I met him a couple of times, and he was a real gentleman. A very cool, regular guy. Looked me right in the eye. Good guy." However, Rourke has since denounced Putin for his role in the Russian invasion of Ukraine and has urged him to end the conflict.

In 2015, Rourke expressed his support for the Ben Carson 2016 presidential campaign. He also denounced Republican frontrunner Donald Trump as a "bully". Rourke revealed that he has had a personal vendetta against Trump after an incident in which Trump sued both him and Tupac Shakur in the 1990s. Rourke has since been very vocal in his criticisms of Trump's presidency, referring to him as a "Garbage Can" president. In 2022, Rourke claimed that Trump had sent the United States Secret Service to visit him as a result of his comments on Trump.

In July 2020, Rourke expressed support for Joe Biden in the 2020 United States presidential election on his Instagram account, encouraging him to "Go get his fat ass, Joe @joebiden" and showing disapproval for Trump. In August, he expressed support for Kamala Harris following her nomination for vice president in the 2020 United States presidential election following previous approval of her earlier in July. In October, Rourke voted for Biden and Harris, which he said was the first time he had ever voted.

=== Dogs ===
In addition to his faith, Rourke has publicly attributed his comeback to his dogs. He is known as a pet lover, particularly fond of small-breed dogs. A spay/neuter advocate, Rourke participated in a protest outside a pet shop in 2007 and has done a public service announcement for PETA.

His first little dog was reportedly a gift from his second wife. Though Rourke's dogs are generally referred to as "chihuahuas", some are not purebred. Loki, his most-publicized dog whom he described as "the love of my life", was a chihuahua-terrier mix. So reliant was Rourke on Loki's companionship, he spent US$5,400 to have her flown to England while he was on the set of the film Stormbreaker.

Rourke gave his dogs credit during his Golden Globe Best Actor acceptance speech January 11, 2009: "I'd like to thank all my dogs. The ones that are here, the ones that aren't here anymore because sometimes when a man's alone, that's all you got is your dog. And they've meant the world to me." The day of the 2009 Golden Globes, he told Barbara Walters that "I sort of self-destructed and everything came out about 14 years ago or so ... the wife had left, the career was over, the money was not an ounce. The dogs were there when no one else was there." Asked by Walters if he had considered suicide, he responded:

Yeah, I didn't want to be here, but I didn't want to kill myself. I just wanted to push a button and disappear.... I think I hadn't left the house for four or five months, and I was sitting in the closet, sleeping in the closet for some reason, and I was in a bad place, and I just remember I was thinking, "Oh, man, if I do this," [and] then I looked at my dog, Beau Jack, and he made a sound, like a little almost human sound. I don't have kids, the dogs became everything to me. The dog was looking at me going, "Who's going to take care of me?"

— Mickey Rourke

Beau Jack sired two of Rourke's later pets, Loki and her littermate Chocolate. Beau Jack died in 2002, although Rourke reportedly gave him 45 minutes of mouth-to-mouth resuscitation. Chocolate was the subject of a children's book, Chocolate at the Four Seasons, about his temporary stay with producer Bonnie Timmermann. Chocolate returned to Rourke and died in 2006. In addition to those dogs and several other past pets, Rourke owned a chihuahua named Jaws who appeared with him in his 2009 PETA ad, as well as in the film Once Upon a Time in Mexico. Jaws originally was named "Little Mickey" and was slated to be euthanized before adoption. Rourke also believed Jaws was previously abused. He has had as many as seven dogs at one time, back in 2005. At the time of his Golden Globes tribute to his pets, Rourke owned five chihuahuas: Loki, Jaws, Ruby Baby, La Negra and Bella Loca. About a month later, on February 16, 2009, Loki died in Rourke's arms at the age of 18.

== Professional boxing record ==
8 fights	6 wins	0 losses
By knockout	5	0
By decision	1	0
Draws	2	

No.	Result	Record	Opponent	Type	Round, time	Date	Location	Notes
8	Draw	6–0–2	Sean Gibbons	MD	4	Sep 8, 1994	Davie Arena, Davie, Florida, U.S.	
7	Win	6–0–1	Thomas McCoy	TKO	3 (4)	Nov 20, 1993	Sporthalle, Hamburg, Germany	
6	Win	5–0–1	Bubba Stotts	TKO	3 (4)	Jul 24, 1993	John Hammonds Center, Joplin, Missouri, U.S.	
5	Win	4–0–1	Tom Bentley	TKO	1 (4)	Mar 30, 1993	Kemper Arena, Kansas City, Missouri, U.S.	
4	Win	3–0–1	Terry Jesmer	TKO	4 (4)	Dec 12, 1992	Palacio de los Deportes, Oviedo, Spain	
3	Win	2–0–1	Darrell Miller	KO	1 (4)	23 Jun 1992	Kokugikan, Tokyo, Japan	
2	Draw	1–0–1	Francisco Harris	MD	4	Apr 25, 1992	Convention Center, Miami Beach, Florida, U.S.	
1	Win	1–0	Steve Powell	UD	4	May 23, 1991	FTL War Memorial, Fort Lauderdale, Florida, U.S.	

== Exhibition boxing record ==
1 fight	1 win	0 losses
By knockout	1	0

No.	Result	Record	Opponent	Type	Round, time	Date	Location	Notes
1	Win	1–0	Elliot Seymour	KO	2 (5), 2:00	Nov 28, 2014	Luzhniki Stadium, Moscow, Russia	

== Awards and nominations ==
Year	Award	Nomination	Film	Result
1983	Boston Society of Film Critics Award	Best Supporting Actor	Diner	Won
1983	National Society of Film Critics	Best Supporting Actor	Diner	Won
1988	Independent Spirit Awards	Best Actor	Barfly	Nominated
1991	Golden Raspberry Awards	Worst Actor	Desperate Hours & Wild Orchid	Nominated
2006	Saturn Award	Best Supporting Actor	Sin City	Won
2006	Chicago Film Critics Association	Best Supporting Actor	Sin City	Won
2006	Irish Film and Television Awards	Best International Actor	Sin City	Won
2006	Online Film Critics Society	Best Supporting Actor	Sin City	Won
2006	Satellite Award	Best Supporting Actor	Sin City	Nominated
2006	Washington DC Area Film Critics Association	Best Ensemble	Sin City	Nominated
2006	Critics' Choice Award	Best Ensemble	Sin City	Nominated
2008	Golden Orange Award	Honorary Award		Won
2008	Satellite Awards	Best Actor – Drama	The Wrestler	Nominated
2008	Washington D.C. Area Film Critics	Best Actor	The Wrestler	Won
2008	San Francisco Film Critics	Best Actor	The Wrestler	Won
2008	Broadcast Film Critics	Best Actor	The Wrestler	Nominated
2008	San Diego Film Critics Society	Best Actor	The Wrestler	Won
2008	Toronto Film Critics Association	Best Actor	The Wrestler	Won
2008	Chicago Film Critics Association	Best Actor	The Wrestler	Won
2008	Florida Film Critics Circle	Best Actor	The Wrestler	Won
2008	Detroit Film Critics Society	Best Actor	The Wrestler	Won
2009	Golden Globe Award	Best Actor – Drama	The Wrestler	Won
2009	Independent Spirit Award	Best Male Lead	The Wrestler	Won
2009	BAFTA Award	Best Actor	The Wrestler	Won
2009	Academy Awards	Best Actor	The Wrestler	Nominated
2009	Screen Actors Guild Awards	Best Actor	The Wrestler	Nominated
2009	Santa Barbara International Film Festival	Riviera Award	The Wrestler	Won
2010	Scream Awards	Best Villain	Iron Man 2	Won
2011	MTV Movie Awards	Best Villain	Iron Man 2	Nominated
