= Christian Sesma =

American film director

Christian Sesma is an American filmmaker. He has directed such films as Vigilante Diaries (2016), Paydirt (2020), Take Back (2021) and Every Last One of Them (2021).

Sesma was born and raised in the Coachella Valley. He grew up in Palm Springs, California. He divides his time between Cathedral City, California and West Hollywood, California.

== Filmography ==
Year	Film	Credited as			
Year	Film	Director	Producer	Writer	Notes
2005	6:30 (video)	Yes	Yes	Yes	Also editor
2007	On Bloody Sunday	Yes	Yes	Yes	Also editor
2009	The Deported	No	No	Yes	
2010	Shoot the Hero!	Yes	Yes	Yes	
2010	I'm Not Like That No More	Yes	No	Yes	
2014	Lost Time	Yes	Yes	Yes	
2014	Live Nude Girls	No	Yes	No	
2015	AWOL-72	Yes	Yes	Yes	
2015	The Night Crew	Yes	Yes	Yes	
2016	Vigilante Diaries	Yes	Yes	Yes	
2016	Mind Blown	Yes	No	Yes	TV movie
2017	Doomsday Device	Yes	No	Yes	TV movie
2017	Jaded	Yes	No	Yes	TV movie
2020	Paydirt	Yes	Yes	Yes	
2021	Take Back	Yes	Yes	No	
2021	Every Last One of Them	Yes	Yes	Yes	
2022	Section Eight	Yes	Yes	No	
2024	Lights Out	Yes	No	No	
2025	Into the Deep	Yes	No	No	
