= Bergeron Rodeo Grounds =

Sports venue in Davie, Florida

Coordinates: 26.068548°N 80.233784°W

The Bergeron Rodeo Grounds were founded in the early 1940s. They are located in the historical western theme downtown district of Davie, Florida. They serve as Davie's main tourist attraction. This indoor/outdoor facility has been building and establishing itself as one of the up-and-coming multi-cultural locales in South Florida. Originally the center was established as a rodeo arena, but as the need for a more versatile activity increased, the arena expanded to meet the demands for such diverse events as top name concert entertainers and family events that include circus, monster trucks, horse shows, dog shows, car shows, air boat shows, specialty shows and industrial shows.

== History ==
The roots of the Bergeron Rodeo Grounds date to the early 1920s when local residents began having rodeos. Seventeen local residents constructed a pit and named it Davie Rodeo Arena. Two of the leaders were Claude Tindall, to whom the arena was dedicated in 1977, and Percy Bergeron, who owned a tiny country grocery store in town. Official rodeos were held twice per year until rodeo stars Troy Weekley, his brothers Dan and Wayne Weekley, and Donald Parrish started Five Star Rodeo about 20 years ago. The rodeo, which hosts 14 bull-riding, rodeo and youth events, is considered the oldest in Florida and is part of the Professional Rodeo Cowboys Association circuit.

In 1978, the town planned to scrap the arena for youth athletic fields, but about 200 residents rode horseback to a town council meeting in protest. The arena was saved, and the Davie Rodeo Association, previously called Davie for Horses, was formed to protect it. A roof was added to the arena in 1984-1985. In 1995, Percy Bergeron's son, developer and businessman Ron Bergeron, donated $150,000 toward the purchase of land for parking followed by $160,000 in 1996 to landscape and pave the entryway. The area surrounding the arena then was named Bergeron Rodeo Grounds.

== Controversy ==
Bergeron is host to the Sunshine Stampede, which is organized by the Florida Gay Rodeo Association. It also is the focus of a campaign by the Animal Rights Foundation of Florida for its use of animals in traditional rodeo events.
