= Rogue Warrior (video game) =

2009 video game

- Developer: Rebellion Developments
- Publisher: Bethesda Softworks
- Producer: Michael Burnham
- Designer: Tim Jones
- Programmer: Kevin Floyer-Lea
- Artist: Martin Carter
- Writer: Richard Marcinko
- Composer: Mark Rutherford
- Platforms: Microsoft Windows; PlayStation 3; Xbox 360
- Release: AU: 26 November 2009; EU: 27 November 2009; NA: 1 December 2009
- Genre: First-person shooter
- Modes: Single-player, multiplayer

Rogue Warrior is a first-person shooter video game developed by Rebellion Developments and published by Bethesda Softworks for Microsoft Windows, PlayStation 3 and Xbox 360. It was released on 26 November 2009 in Australia, 27 November in Europe, and 1 December in North America.

In Rogue Warrior, the United States has sent in Richard Marcinko, a foul-mouthed veteran U.S. Navy SEAL, on a mission into North Korea to disrupt ballistic missile launchers during the Cold War. Despite the game being named after Marcinko's 1992 autobiography, the game's storyline bears no relation to it or to his subsequent series of fiction novels. Marcinko is voiced by actor Mickey Rourke.

First announced in 2006, Rogue Warrior was originally being developed by Zombie Studios, and was set for a 2007 release. However, the game's release was delayed after Bethesda stated they were unsatisfied with the direction Zombie Studios was taking the game. Bethesda quickly scrapped the project and brought in Rebellion Development to develop an entire new game from scratch. Rebellion, while retaining some major elements from Zombie's rendition, has taken a whole new approach to the game and its focus.

Rogue Warrior received negative reviews from critics. Criticism of the game included its uninteresting gameplay, poor controls, frequent profanity, rushed production, short length, limited multiplayer, and broken and exploited combat techniques. It has since been cited as one of the worst games ever made.

== Gameplay ==
Richard Marcinko using a kill move to eliminate an enemy

Rogue Warrior is primarily a first-person shooter with tactical elements. The player assumes control of Richard "Demo Dick" Marcinko, also known as "Rogue Warrior". The primary goal for Marcinko begins as an infiltration mission to disrupt hostile missiles and evolves to prevent other potentially dangerous situations. The player starts each level armed with a Beretta 92FS (which has a silencer and an infinite number of magazines), a Heckler & Koch MP5A2 (which has neither), and five M26 grenades (out of a total of six the player can carry at once). The player can also carry a third weapon found in a level and swap out the MP5A2 for another gun the player finds (the 92FS can't be discarded). The player has the option to shoot fuse boxes inside buildings to kill the lights and confuse enemies, making it easier to sneak up on them, and can equip night-vision goggles for dark areas. Also, explosive barrels and fuel tanks can be shot to kill enemies.

The focus of the gameplay is Marcinko's over-the-top methods and signature execution moves. When the player is close to an enemy, they may press one of several buttons to trigger an instant kill via finishing moves, referred to as "Kill Moves" in the game. There are more than twenty-five finishing moves available to players. Such moves include throwing an enemy over a rail, slashing their throat, or shooting them in the head with their own weapons. Upon initiating a finishing move, the in-game camera shifts to a third-person cinematic angle to show the finishing animation. A cover system akin to Tom Clancy's Rainbow Six: Vegas is incorporated. This allows the player to blind-fire and pop in and out of cover, but some positions of cover may be destroyed. There is also a checkpoint system that tracks player progress.

== Plot ==
In 1986, Richard Marcinko (voiced by Mickey Rourke), a U.S. Navy SEAL, is sent on a classified mission into Unggi, North Korea, with two other SEALs, to retrieve intelligence from a North Korean mole on ballistic missiles of an unfamiliar design that North Korea is supposedly in possession of, as well as to recon a factory that is allegedly developing the missiles. Shortly after touching ground, Marcinko's unit successfully takes out a Korean People's Army patrol, but one of the North Koreans suffers only wounds and manages to pull the pin of one of his grenades, killing Marcinko's team. Admiral Travis Payton (voiced by Neal McDonough), the commander of the operation, demands that Marcinko abort, but he refuses, saying he intends to finish the mission. After fighting through Unggi, Marcinko discovers the mole was killed. However, he finds the intel in the mole's apartment room on missile launchers that have been developed in Unggi.

Marcinko is then ordered by Payton to disable the missile launchers by any means necessary. Marcinko enters the facility that is producing the missile launchers but finds that only one is present. According to intelligence received from Payton, the rest of the launchers are being moved out by sea. After destroying the missile, Marcinko heads to the Unggi harbor and sees that they are actually being sent out of Unggi by train to the Soviet Union, not far from Unggi. Marcinko boards the train and destroys it as it crosses the border. Marcinko enters Soviet territory and gathers intelligence that the ballistic missiles were of Soviet origin, not North Korean. Marcinko also notices that the remaining ballistic missiles were moved out of North Korea to a palace in the Soviet Union. Marcinko insists on going after the missiles, but Payton warns that an attempt to go after the missiles will not only result in Marcinko's court-martial but even war between the United States and the Soviet Union. Marcinko dismisses these warnings and goes after the missiles.

Marcinko enters the palace where the missiles are located. He contacts Payton, who threatens to have Marcinko court-martialed for disobeying orders. Marcinko suggests that he found proof that the Soviet Union created a missile defense program aimed to deter any U.S. nuclear launch against Soviet territory. This program was similar to the real-life U.S. Star Wars program aimed at deterring any Soviet missile attack on U.S. territory. Marcinko launches a missile at the palace, destroys the missiles located in a bunker under the palace, and escapes the palace. Marcinko then goes to a dam to disrupt electricity to a Soviet submarine base. Marcinko then heads to the submarine base with the purpose of destroying a submarine carrying the remaining missiles. Marcinko escapes onto a patrol boat with Navy SEALs aboard that were sent by Payton to help Marcinko. Marcinko hands over a computer chip to the commanding SEAL of the boat and tells him that it is evidence that justifies Marcinko's actions that is to be presented at his court-martial.

== Development ==
Announced in the fall of 2006 as a partnership between Bethesda Softworks and Zombie Studios, Rogue Warrior: Black Razor was billed as a tactical first-person shooter for release in 2007. Set in present-day North Korea, the plot focused on Marcinko and his team's effort to neutralize the country's nuclear launch capabilities. The game was supposed to include drop-in four-player cooperative and 24-player competitive multiplayer, with the latter featuring a unique map system where each team would select the layout of their territory, and the center area of the map would be randomized.

In 2009, the game resurfaced after much silence. Bethesda publicly stated that they were not satisfied with the direction Zombie was taking the game. Bethesda scrapped the project and commissioned Rebellion Developments to develop the game. Starting fresh, Rebellion made numerous changes to the gameplay, plot, and features. The setting shifted to 1986 Soviet Union and North Korea; the game engine became proprietary; the cooperative play was struck along with the multiplayer tiling system; the overall focus turned to Marcinko's personality and kill moves, and the name was shortened to simply Rogue Warrior. Mickey Rourke was also announced as the celebrity voice actor for Marcinko. On 6 September, the video game website GameSpot posted the game's first preview after the game had been reconstructed.

== Reception ==
Reception

Aggregate score
Aggregator	Score		
Aggregator	PC	PS3	Xbox 360
Metacritic	29/100	27/100	28/100

Review scores
Publication	Score		
Publication	PC	PS3	Xbox 360
Eurogamer	N/A	N/A	2/10
Game Informer	N/A	1.5/10	1.5/10
GamePro	N/A	N/A	1.5/5
GameSpot	2/10	N/A	2/10
GameSpy	N/A	0.5/5	0.5/5
GameZone	N/A	N/A	2/10
Giant Bomb	N/A	2/5	2/5
IGN	1.5/10	1.5/10	1.5/10
Official Xbox Magazine (US)	N/A	N/A	4/10
PC Gamer (US)	25%	N/A	N/A
PlayStation: The Official Magazine	N/A	1.5/5	N/A

Rogue Warrior received "unfavorable" reviews on all platforms according to the review aggregation website Metacritic.

GameSpot said of the PC and Xbox 360 versions, "This dreadfully boring, expletive-filled, extremely short shooter is an absolute rip-off." IGN said that the gameplay is poorly done. GameZone's Natalie Romano said of the Xbox 360 version, "A very disappointing game from start to finish, Rogue Warrior is a game that brings nothing new to the genre nor does it make for a fun first-person shooter worth the money. Simply put, this isn't just an awful shooter but it's also a terrible game. Sorry, but this is one hero we would like to leave behind." Andrew Reiner of Game Informer concluded that "with the gunplay being as bad as it is, and the story coming across as a six-year-old's interpretation of Cold War events, the only fun comes from the possibility of stepping into the shoes of a blatantly homoerotic Rambo".

== See also ==
- List of video games notable for negative reception
