= Richard Marcinko =

American US Navy officer and convicted criminal (1940–2021)

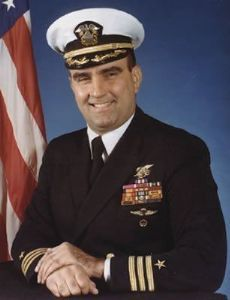
- Marcinko's official portrait, 1978
- Born: November 21, 1940; Lansford, Pennsylvania, U.S.
- Died: December 25, 2021 (aged 81); Fauquier County, Virginia, U.S.
- Education: Auburn University at Montgomery; U.S. Naval Postgraduate School
- Military career
- Allegiance: United States
- Branch: United States Navy
- Service years: 1958–1989
- Rank: Commander
- Commands: SEAL Team 2 SEAL Team 6 Red Cell
- Awards: Silver Star; Legion of Merit; Bronze Star Medal (4); Navy Commendation Medal (2); Vietnamese Cross of Gallantry
- Other work: CEO of SOS Temps, Inc. and Red Cell International

Richard Marcinko (November 21, 1940 – December 25, 2021) was a U.S. Navy SEAL commander, Vietnam War veteran, and convicted fraudster. He was the first commanding officer of SEAL Team Six. After retiring from the United States Navy, he became an author, radio talk show host, military consultant, and motivational speaker.

== Early life and education ==
Marcinko was born November 21, 1940, in Lansford, Pennsylvania, and was of Croatian and Slovak descent. At a young age, his family moved to New Brunswick, New Jersey.

He received a Bachelor of Arts degree in international relations from the Auburn University at Montgomery and a Master of Arts degree in political science from the U.S. Naval Postgraduate School.

== Naval career ==
=== Vietnam War ===
After dropping out of high school, Marcinko tried to enlist in the United States Marines, who rejected him due to a lack of a high school diploma. Marcinko successfully enlisted in the United States Navy in September 1958 as a radioman. He was assigned to SEAL Team Two in June 1966. In January 1967, Marcinko deployed to Vietnam with 2nd Platoon, SEAL Team Two for a six-month tour of duty. On May 18, 1967, Marcinko led his men in an assault on Ilo Ilo Hon (Ilo Ilo Island), where they killed a large number of Viet Cong and destroyed six of their sampans. He was awarded the first of four Bronze Stars for this action.

Marcinko returned to Vietnam with SEAL Team Two after a few months stateside as officer-in-charge of 8th Platoon from December 1967 to June 1968. During the Tet Offensive, Marcinko ordered his platoon to assist U.S. Army Special Forces at Châu Đốc. What began as an urban street battle turned into a rescue mission of American nurses and a schoolteacher trapped in the city's church and hospital.

After completing his second tour in Vietnam and a two-year stateside staff assignment, Marcinko was promoted to lieutenant commander and assigned as the naval attaché to Cambodia in 1973. After serving in Cambodia for 18 months, Marcinko returned stateside and assumed command of SEAL Team Two from 1974 to 1976.

=== SEAL Team Six ===
During the Iran hostage crisis in 1979, Marcinko was one of two Navy representatives for a Joint Chiefs of Staff task force known as the TAT (Terrorist Action Team). The purpose of the TAT was to develop a plan to free the American hostages held in Iran which culminated in Operation Eagle Claw. In the wake of the debacle, the Navy saw the need for a full-time dedicated counter-terrorist team and tasked Marcinko with its design and development.

Marcinko was selected by Chief of Naval Operations Admiral Thomas B. Hayward as the first commanding officer of this new unit. At the time, the Navy had only two SEAL teams. Marcinko purportedly named the unit SEAL Team Six in order to confuse other nations, specifically the Soviet Union, into believing that the United States had at least three other SEAL teams that they were unaware of. He personally selected the unit's members from across the existing SEAL and Underwater Demolition Teams, including a special counter-terrorist tactics section of SEAL Team Two, codenamed MOB-6. SEAL Team Six would be the Navy's premier counter-terrorist and hostage rescue unit, like its Army counterpart Delta Force. While typically a two-year command, Marcinko commanded SEAL Team Six for three years, from August 1980 to July 1983.

=== Red Cell ===
After relinquishing command of SEAL Team Six to Captain Robert Gormly, Marcinko was tasked by Vice Admiral James "Ace" Lyons, Deputy Chief of Naval Operations, with the design of a unit to test the Navy's vulnerability to terrorism. This unit was the Naval Security Coordination Team OP-06D, unofficially named Red Cell.

== Personal life ==
=== Kickback trial and imprisonment ===
Marcinko was indicted for conspiracy, conflict of interest and lying to the government on July 13, 1989, in connection with a kickback of $113,000 paid to Ramco International, a company set up by Marcinko and former SEAL John B. Mason, by Accuracy Systems, a Phoenix, Arizona-based arms manufacturer owned by Charles M. Byers. Byers was convicted of conspiracy and conflict of interest on October 20, 1989, but Marcinko was acquitted of conflict of interest.

Marcinko was convicted of conspiracy to defraud the government on January 24, 1990. The jury in that trial also acquitted Marcinko of a separate count of bribery.

On March 9, 1990, Marcinko was sentenced to 21 months in federal prison and fined $10,000 under charges of defrauding the government over the price of contractor acquisitions for hand grenades. Marcinko maintained that he was the subject of a witch-hunt for his work with Red Cell and that the fraud committed revealed the weaknesses of military security. Marcinko detailed his arrest and confinement in the last chapters of his autobiography.

=== Civilian life ===
Marcinko published a VHS and DVD movie account of his "Red Cell" operations.

His experiences led him to write his autobiography, The New York Times best-selling Rogue Warrior, and subsequent fictional sequels, most of which were co-written with ghostwriter John Weisman. With Weisman, Marcinko co-authored a three-book series on leadership, management and team-building for business executives.

In 2000, Marcinko was hired by Ron Howard to help Jim Carrey endure the eight-hour costuming process for How the Grinch Stole Christmas in an attempt to dissuade Carrey from dropping out from production.

In 2005, Marcinko wrote an op-ed criticizing what he called "the liberals attack on the activities at GITMO prison, or Abu Ghraib detention centers", claiming that "manipulation is what has been practiced at our detention centers".

At the time of his death, Marcinko was CEO of Red Cell International and formerly of SOS Temps, Inc., a private security consulting firm based in Washington, D.C. He had a politically conservative talk radio show, America on Watch with Dick Marcinko, which was broadcast live. He was a spokesman for the Zodiac boat company's Zodiac Maritime Training Academy, and served as a consultant on FOX's television series 24. He briefly collaborated with Strider Knives on a series of knife designs referred to as the "RW" signifying "Rogue Warrior" from 2008 to 2010.

=== Death ===
Marcinko died due to a massive heart attack at his home in Fauquier County, Virginia, on Christmas Day, December 25, 2021, at the age of 81.

=== Alleged connection to Jeffrey Epstein ===
With the partial release of the Epstein files In February of 2026, testimonies and correspondence from Kenneth Turner, an FBI informant, became public. In these documents, Turner alleges that Marcinko and Jeffrey Epstein organized a party in 2014 in Ciudad Juárez which was attended by Earl Anthony Wayne, who at the time served as the US ambassador to Mexico. Turner further alleges Wayne was arrested by the Federal Police due to having impregnated an underage girl at the party, although Marcinko served the sentence in his place.

== Awards and decorations ==
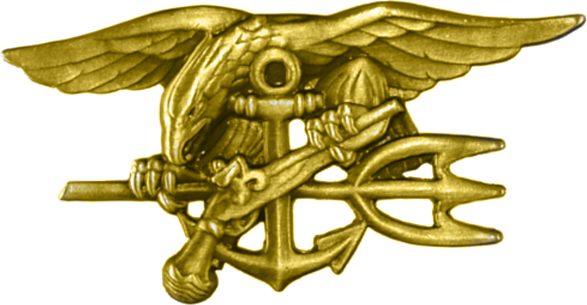

Badge	Special Warfare insignia		
1st row	Silver Star		Legion of Merit
2nd row	Bronze Star with Gold "V" device and 3 Gold 5/16 inch stars	Defense Meritorious Service Medal	Navy Commendation Medal with Gold "V" device and 1 Gold 5/16 inch star
3rd row	Combat Action Ribbon with 3 Gold 5/16 inch stars	Presidential Unit Citation with 2 Bronze Service star	Good Conduct Medal with 1 Bronze Service star
4th row	National Defense Service Medal	Armed Forces Expeditionary Medal	Vietnam Service Medal with 4 Campaign stars
5th row	Republic of Vietnam Cross of Gallantry with 1 Silver 5/16 inch star	Republic of Vietnam Campaign Medal	Gallantry Cross Unit Citation Emblem with Palm and Frame
6th row	Civil Actions Medal Unit Citation Ribbon	Civil Actions Medal Second Class	Expert Rifle Marksmanship Medal
Badge	Naval Parachutist insignia		

== Bibliography ==
=== Nonfiction ===
- Rogue Warrior (1992; with John Weisman), ISBN 0-671-70390-0
- Leadership Secrets of the Rogue Warrior: A Commando's Guide to Success (1997; with John Weisman), ISBN 0-671-54514-0
- The Rogue Warrior's Strategy for Success (1998), ISBN 0-671-00994-X
- The Real Team (1999; with John Weisman), ISBN 0-671-02465-5

=== Fiction ===
Marcinko's fiction adventure novels depict himself as recounting the events of the story as they happen, in a timeline with his autobiography as the starting point. John Weisman co-wrote with him from Red Cell to Detachment Bravo in 2001. Jim deFelice became his writing partner from Vengeance to Blood Lies.

- Red Cell (1994): Three years after his conviction, Marcinko works as a security expert in Japan. A chance run-in with a nuclear smuggling operation at Narita Airport leads to him being brought back into the Navy to investigate. His team of SEALs uncover a plot by a former Secretary of Defense to deliver American nuclear warheads to an ultra-right wing Japanese movement.
- Green Team (1995): A British aircraft carrier is bombed at its decommissioning ceremonies, killing the head of the British Admiralty and the US Chief of Naval Operations. Marcinko's group, now called the Green Team, is sent to track clues that the bombing is part of a plan by a British noble of Arabic descent to incite a major Islamic fundamentalist campaign against the West.
- Task Force Blue (1996): A few months after the events of Green Team, Marcinko's group rescues the Secretary of the Navy from a violent militia group but runs afoul of cowardly politicians. With covert backing from the current Chairman of the Joint Chiefs of Staff, the team probes the militia's connections into a subsequent theft of weapons from National Guard armories. They discover that the weapons are meant to arm militias across the country for an American Revolution–style war whose kickoff is timed with the anniversary of the Waco siege.
- Designation Gold (1997): When Marcinko discovers that one of his close friends (whose son Marcinko agreed to be a godfather for) is killed in Russia, he goes off on a mission to find out who did it. Further digging uncovers clues to a plan to arm Syria with weapons of mass destruction and use them on Israel.
- SEAL Force Alpha (1998): Marcinko's SEALs raid a Chinese freighter in the South China Sea and discover that it was shipping weapons to rebel movements across Southeast Asia plus carrying several advanced US-made electronic countermeasures systems. The plot, led by a corrupt U.S. ex-diplomat and a high-ranking PLA general, ultimately requires the SEALs to stop a planned invasion of Taiwan by China.
- Option Delta (1999): An entrapment operation in the Mediterranean uncovers evidence that leads into recent neo-Nazi activity in Germany, their connections with a leading business magnate, and a planned coup d'état. With the help of a friend leading Germany's elite KSK special forces group, Marcinko's men attack a castle in the Black Forest where some stolen nuclear weapons are being stored.
- Echo Platoon (2000): Marcinko is contracted to train Azerbaijan's security forces after a successful rescue operation on an oil complex in the Caspian Sea. When further evidence points to an Iranian-Russian plan to corner the Caspian's oil deposits, it is up to the Rogue Warrior's team to turn the tide.
- Detachment Bravo (2001): Several top executives in the US and Britain are killed in high-profile attacks by the Green Defenders, an Irish Republican Army splinter group that wrecks the Good Friday Peace Accords. Now running a joint US-UK group of special operations soldiers with support from the FBI and NSA, Marcinko scrambles to stop the Green Defenders before they carry out another international terrorist attack - with the only problem being a lack of details on when and where the attack will take place and who's the target.
- Violence of Action (2002): Marcinko takes some time off for self-reflection. When a nuclear shipment is hijacked, Marcinko springs into action with his team of security experts to stop a former Army colonel threatening nuclear annihilation of Portland, Oregon.
- Vengeance (2005): Marcinko's private security team is contracted to run anti-terrorist security exercises at various US facilities to test their vulnerability (to the consternation of the Department of Homeland Security). However, someone is sending Marcinko certain messages of revenge directed at him—and he discovers that a loved one of someone he once killed is out for his head.
- Holy Terror (2006): Marcinko's private security company, Red Cell International, oversees a top NATO conference in the Vatican when he kills a waiter attempting to bomb the meeting. He later sees the attack as part of a major campaign against the Catholic Church.
- Dictator's Ransom (2008): Having read all of Marcinko's books, North Korean leader Kim Jong-il hires him to bring back an illegitimate son who's gone missing. Marcinko's subtly convinced by the CIA to take up the assignment (after initially resisting the temptation of Kim's $64 million reward), but things get muddled when the lover of one of his associates holds the missing child hostage in return for a North Korean nuclear weapon.
- Seize the Day (2009): When a casual observation of Marcinko leads one to believe that he can pass off for a slightly younger Fidel Castro, the CIA has him as the lead talent in a fake video of Castro's last will and testament and send it to Cuba for circulation, with some insights from one of the former dictator's barbers. However, a deathbed-ridden Castro his own game to play: using Cuban refugees to the US as viral carriers - and Marcinko's own illegitimate son is in the crossfire.
- Domino Theory (2011): Marcinko's security company is hired to oversee security preparations for the 2010 Commonwealth Games in India. An explosion at a nearby Indian Army base gets his attention, as the base was a nuclear-weapon storage site. It is discovered that a Pakistani group aims to hijack India's nukes.
- Blood Lies (2012): Marcinko is contracted to head down to Mexico and rescue a former SEAL's daughter kidnapped by Mexican drug cartels. Investigations of a real-estate subdivision south of the border that has scammed American senior citizens later point to the cartels sheltering Hezbollah militants and a plan to kill the US Secretary of State (alluded to as Hillary Clinton)
- Rogue Warrior: Curse of the Infidel (2014): A botched CIA sting operation targeting an al-Qaeda-backed terrorist cell deep in money laundering—with Marcinko's Red Cell International somehow included in the mix—leads to SEAL Team Six coming to the rescue. Little does everyone know that cell is connected to a plan to blow up a cruise liner right inside a US harbor. Marcinko's private security operatives join forces with SEAL Six to stop the threat—and this time, bring in some of Six's original SEALs into the battle.

=== Articles ===
- "Ethics in the War against Terrorism" for World Defense Review, July 15, 2005

== Filmography ==
=== Advisory ===
- G.I. Jane
- The Rock
- 24 (Season 5)

=== Participatory ===
- Red Cell (VHS & Special Edition DVD)
- Advanced Hostage Rescue (VHS & DVD)
- Navy SEAL: Tides of SPECWAR (DVD)

== Video game ==
Marcinko partnered with Bethesda Softworks to publish Rogue Warrior for the Xbox 360, PS3 and PC. Marcinko himself is the protagonist and is voiced by actor Mickey Rourke. In the game, Marcinko is sent on a classified mission into North Korea to disrupt an anti-ballistic missile program. Released in December 2009, the game was critically panned, with critics citing poor AI, excessive use of expletives, numerous bugs, poor graphics, a short single-player mode and limited multiplayer mode. In 2019, PC Gamer listed Rogue Warrior as one of the worst video games of all time, calling it "painfully boring, laughably short, and criminally unimaginative".

== See also ==
- Cambodian Navy SEALs
- Charles Alvin Beckwith
- Harry Humphries
- Vong Sarendy
- Tiger team
- List of United States Navy SEALs
