= Eric Potter =

American film editor (born 1971)

Eric Potter is an American film editor known for his work on the films Underworld: Rise of the Lycans, The Vatican Tapes, The Lincoln Lawyer, Sweetwater, and 9/11.

== Selected filmography ==
- Underworld: Rise of the Lycans (2009)
- Beneath the Darkness (2011)
- The Big Ask (2013)
- Kiss Me (2014)
- The Vatican Tapes (2015)
- Honey 3 (2016)
- The Bronx Bull (2017)
- 9/11 (2017)
- Beyond White Space (2018)
- Grand Isle (2019)
- Roped (2020)
- Paydirt (2020)
- Welcome to Sudden Death (2020)
- Paradise Cove (2021)
- Jeepers Creepers: Reborn (2022)
- Sweetwater (2023)
- Crescent City (2024)
- Out of Order (2025)
