= John Cale filmography =

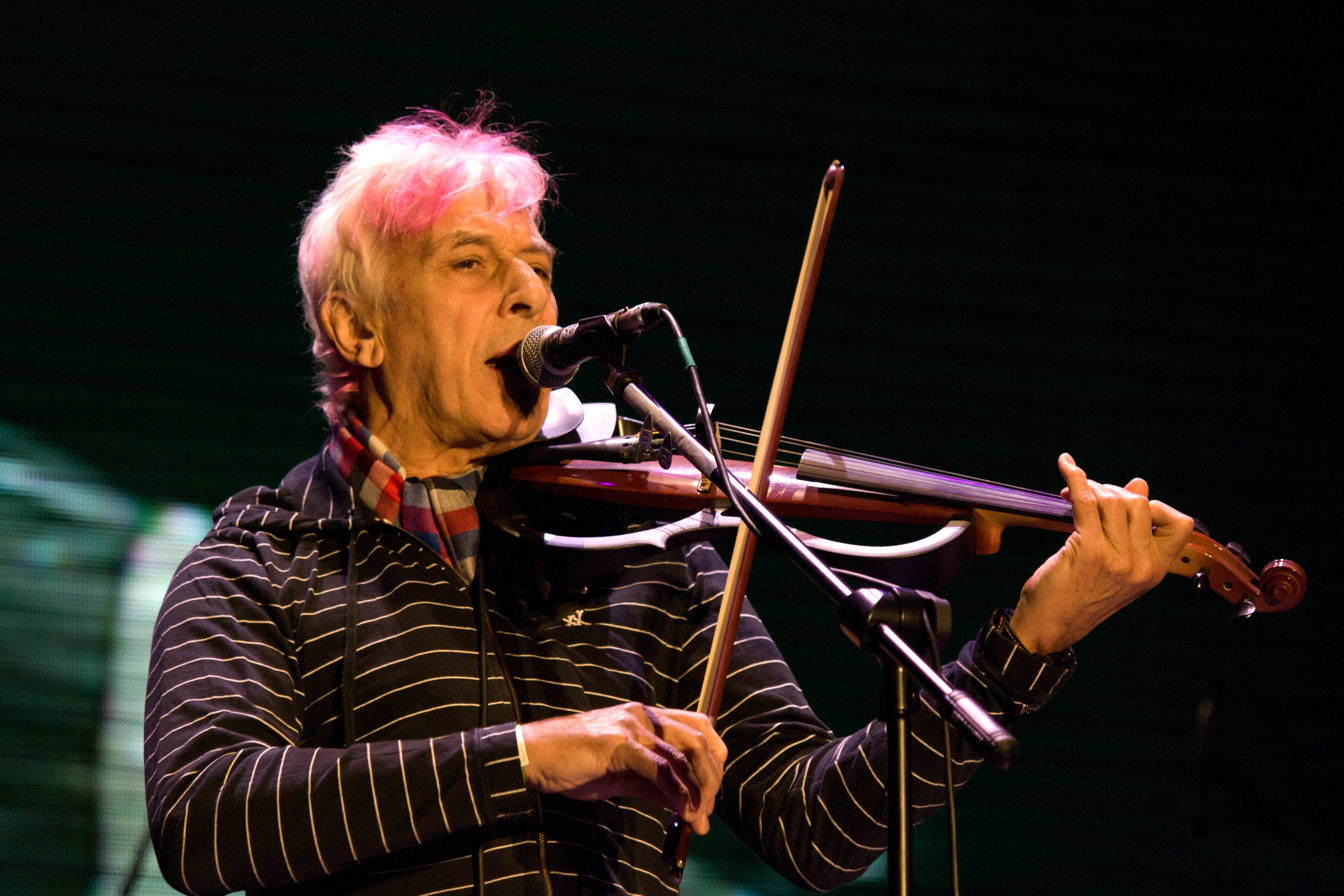
Cale performing live in 2010

John Cale is a Welsh singer, musician, composer, record producer and arranger. Although his main field is music (he composed original musical score for many films), he starred in several films as an actor. It began in the 1960s with appearances in various experimental films and documentaries (mostly by Andy Warhol, but also by other directors). In 1987, he received lessons from an actor F. Murray Abraham and subsequently played the role of a character named Hubbley in the short film The Houseguest. He later starred in several other films and television series. As a composer, he composes mainly for French drama films. He also participated in a variety of documentary films and television programs. As a director he made one experimental film called Police Car.

== Films ==
=== As actor ===
John Cale film and television actor credits
Year	Film	Director	Role	Notes	Ref.
1965	Dirt	Piero Heliczer	himself	Short film	
1965	Venus in Furs	Piero Heliczer	himself		
1965	Satisfaction	Piero Heliczer	himself	Short film	
1966	The Bob Dylan Story	Andy Warhol			
1966	Four Stars (****)	Andy Warhol	Man (uncredited)		
1989	The Houseguest	Franz Harland	Hubbley	Short film	
1989	The Equalizer	Robert E. Warren	Aryan Leader	Episode: "Race Traitors"	
1989	Wonderland USA	Zoe Beloff	Lonely Writer	Short film	
1995	Antártida	Manuel Huerga	himself		
2002	N[eon]	Dave McKean	Narrator	Short film	
2008	Salamandra	Pablo Agüero	Dick Winter	Spanish film	
2014	The Bridge	Stefan Schwartz	Caravan Seller	Episode: "Sorrowsworn"	
2016	Love Twice	Rob Nilsson	Lester	Film	

=== As composer ===
Year	Film	Director	Notes
1971	Women in Revolt	Paul Morrissey	
1972	Heat	Paul Morrissey	
1974	Caged Heat	Jonathan Demme	
1981	Who Am I This Time?	Jonathan Demme	
1986	Something Wild	Jonathan Demme	
1989	Dick	Jo Menell	
1989	The Houseguest	Franz Harland	
1989	Wonderland USA	Zoe Beloff	
1991	Paris s'éveille	Olivier Assayas	
1992	Primary Motive	Daniel Adams	
1993	La Naissance de l'amour	Philippe Garrel	
1994	Ah Pook Is Here	Philip Hunt	
1994	The Unknown	Tod Browning	The Unknown dates from 1927; Cale composed the music for its projection in 1994.
1994	Life Underwater	Zoe Beloff	
1995	Antártida	Manuel Huerga	
1995	Mata Hari	Franz Harland	
1995	Don't Forget You're Going to Die	Xavier Beauvois	
1996	I Shot Andy Warhol	Mary Harron	
1996	Basquiat	Julian Schnabel	
1997	House of America	Marc Evans	
1997	Rhinoceros Hunting in Budapest	Michael Haussman	
1998	Somewhere in the City	Ramin Niami	
1999	Le vent de la nuit	Philippe Garrel	
1999	The Virgin	Diego Donnhofer	
2000	The Farewell	Jan Schütte	
2000	The King's Daughters	Patricia Mazuy	
2000	Love Me	Laetitia Masson	
2000	Beautiful Mistake	Marc Evans	
2000	Wisconsin Death Trip	James Marsh	
2000	American Psycho	Mary Harron	
2002	Nye scener fra Amerika	Jørgen Leth	
2003	Paris	Ramin Niami	
2003	Rhinoceros Eyes	Aaron Woodley	
2003	Y Mabinogi	Derek W. Hayes	
2003	Con Man	Jesse Moss	
2005	About Face: The Story of the Jewish Refugee Soldiers of World War II	Steve Karras	
2005	Process	C.S. Leigh	
2011	A Burning Hot Summer	Philippe Garrel	
2012	Sport de filles	Patricia Mazuy	
2018	Paul Sanchez est revenu!	Patricia Mazuy	

== Documentary appearances ==
Year	Film	Director	Notes
1966	The Velvet Underground Eat Lunch	Danny Williams	
1966	The Velvet Underground	Andy Warhol	Also known as Moe in Bondage.
1966	Sunday Morning	Rosalind Stevenson	short film
1966	The Velvet Underground and Nico: A Symphony of Sound	Andy Warhol	
1966	The Velvet Underground Tarot Cards	Andy Warhol	
1967	Exploding Plastic Inevitable	Ronald Nameth	
1969	Walden (Diaries, Notes and Sketches)	Jonas Mekas	
1986	The South Bank Show	Kim Evans	One episode: "The Velvet Underground"
1987	Put More Blood Into the Music	George Atlas	
1989	Words for the Dying	Rob Nilsson	
1990	Songs for Drella	Edward Lachman	
1993	Velvet Underground: Velvet Redux Live MCMXCIII	Declan Lowney	
1993	Curious: The Velvet Underground in Europe	Declan Lowney	
1995	Dancing Barefoot	Zdeněk Suchý	
1995	Nico Icon	Susanne Ofteringer	
1995	Rock & Roll	David Espar	
1995	Brian Wilson: I Just Wasn't Made for These Times	Don Was	
1997	Arena: The Banana	Kate Meynell	
1997	Synesthesia	Tony Oursler	One episode: "John Cale"
1998	American Masters	Timothy Greenfield-Sanders	One episode: "Lou Reed: Rock and Roll Heart"
1998	John Cale	James Marsh	It was released in 2006 on DVD as John Cale: An Exploration of His Life and Music
2000	Beautiful Mistake	Marc Evans	Welsh title: Camgymeriad Gwych.
2000	The Making of Camgymeriad Gwych	Juan Gelas	Documentary film about Beautiful Mistake.
2001	Andy Warhol: The Complete Picture	Chris Rodley	
2001	Intimate Portrait	Lee Grant	One episode: "Betsey Johnson"
2002	Nye scener fra Amerika	Jørgen Leth	
2003	Dal: Yma/Nawr	Marc Evans	
2003	JC-03	Grant Gee	
2005	Punk: Attitude	Don Letts	
2007	A Walk Into the Sea: Danny Williams and the Warhol Factory	Esther Robinson	
2007	Seven Ages of Rock	Francis Whately and Alastair Laurence	Two episodes: "White Light, White Heat: Art Rock" and "Blank Generation: Punk Rock"
2007	Once Upon a Time in New York: The Birth of Hip Hop, Disco & Punk	Benjamin Whalley	
2009	Week In, Week Out	Nick Skinner	One episode: "Heroin, Wales and Me"
2014	LOOP>>60Hz: Transmissions from The Drone Orchestra	Bevis Bowden	
2014	Lennon or McCartney	Matt Schichter	
2015	Better than the Original: The Joy of the Cover Version	David Vincent	
2017	Raising the Hare	Bevis Bowden	Voice only
2021	The Velvet Underground	Todd Haynes	
