= 5 Tracks =

EP by John Cale
- Released: 26 May 2003
- Studio: MediaLuna Studios, New York; Engine Studios, Chicago, Illinois
- Genre: Art pop, art rock
- Length: 19:42
- Label: EMI
- Producer: John Cale, Andy Green, Dimitri Tikovoï

John Cale EPs chronology
Animal Justice (1977)	5 Tracks (2003)	Extra Playful (2011)

Professional ratings
Review scores
Source	Rating
BBC Music	(favourable)
No Ripcord	(6/10)
Uncut	(3/10)

5 Tracks is the second extended play by the Welsh musician John Cale, released in May 2003 and comprising five previously unreleased songs. It was Cale's first release for EMI. The EP was followed by the album HoboSapiens, which was released in October 2003 and does not contain any songs from this EP.

The song "Wilderness Approaching" features in the 2003 Ramin Niami film Paris.

== Track listing ==
All songs written by John Cale.

No.	Title	Length
1.	"Verses"	3:58
2.	"Waiting for Blonde"	3:45
3.	"Chums of Dumpty"	4:22
4.	"E Is Missing"	4:12
5.	"Wilderness Approaching"	3:25

== Personnel ==
- John Cale − vocals, guitar, bass, keyboards, piano
- Eden Cale − background vocals on "Verses"

Technical

- Andy Green - additional production (tracks 2–5)
- Dimitri Tikovoï - additional production (tracks 1–3)
- Rick Myers - art direction, design
- Corinne Day - cover photography
