= Babe's & Rickey's Inn =

- Directed by: Ramin Niami
- Written by: Ramin Niami
- Produced by: Ramin Niami; Behrooz Arshadi; Karen Robson; Azita Shahryarinejad
- Distributed by: Sideshow Releasing, Inc. Cinedigm
- Release date: April 5, 2013
- Running time: 90 minutes
- Country: United States
- Language: English

Babe's & Ricky's Inn is a documentary film directed by Ramin Niami about the famed blues club, Babe's & Rickey's Inn. The film premiered April 5, 2013, at Laemmle Monica in Santa Monica, California.

== Synopsis ==
The documentary captures the last days of Babe's and Ricky's Inn, which is a blues club in South Central Los Angeles. The documentary showcases the contributions made by the club's owner, Mama Laura, an African American woman from Mississippi, who had owned the club for fifty-three years as a place that accommodated artists from different backgrounds. The club was situated in Central Avenue, and there were daily blues concerts performed. Notable musicians like John Lee Hooker, B.B. King, Albert King, Eric Clapton, Keb' Mo', and Zac Harmon have played at the club before.
