= Guo Xiaochuan =

Chinese poet

- 郭小川
- Born: Guo Enda; September 2, 1919; Fengshan, Rehe, Republic of China
- Died: October 18, 1976 (aged 57); Anyang, Henan
- Education: Northeastern University
- Writing career
- Language: Chinese
- Years active: 1940s - 1960s
- Genre: poetry
- Literary movement: "political lyric poetry"

Guo Xiaochuan (Chinese: 郭小川; 1919-1976), original name Guo Enda, was a Chinese poet. He joined the Eighth Route Army in 1937, and began to write free-verse poems during the Second Sino-Japanese War. After 1949, he worked for the Publicity Department of the Chinese Communist Party.

Guo's best known poems includes One and Eight (on which Zhang Junzhao's film of the same name is based), Tree Songs on Forested Areas, Forest of Sugar Cane -- Gree Gauze Curtain and Gazing at the Starring Sky. Along with He Jingzhi, he is considered as one of the major practitioners of "political lyric poetry" style. However, Guo's poems care more about individual perception, and some of his works were strictly criticized in China in the late 1950s.
