= The Night Caller =

The Night Caller may refer to:

- The Night Caller (1965 film), a British film
- The Night Caller (1998 film), an American film
- The Night Caller (TV series), a British TV miniseries
- Fear Over the City (Peur sur la ville), a 1975 French film, also known as The Night Caller
- The Night Caller, a nickname for Australian serial killer Eric Edgar Cooke
- Night Caller (2021 film), an American horror film
