= Shirin in Love =

2014 film directed by Ramin Niami

- Directed by: Ramin Niami
- Written by: Ramin Niami
- Produced by: Ray Moheet; Behrooz Arshadi; Ramin Niami; Karen Robson; Nick Soper; Arghavan Gousheh; Maz Jobrani; Nina Attaripour
- Starring: George Wallace; Amy Madigan; Anahita Khalatbari; Nazanin Boniadi; Riley Smith; Marshall Manesh; Maz Jobrani
- Production company: Sideshow, Inc.
- Distributed by: Sideshow Releasing
- Release date: March 14, 2014
- Running time: 105 minutes
- Countries: United States; Iran
- Languages: English; Persian

Shirin in Love is an Iranian-American romantic comedy film directed by Ramin Niami and starring Nazanin Boniadi, Riley Smith, Maz Jobrani and Anahita Khalatbari. It was released in March 2014 via AMC Independent.

== Plot ==
Shirin is an absent-minded, yet sophisticated, young Iranian-American woman who lives in "Tehrangeles", the large Iranian community of Los Angeles. While Shirin has been engaged for years to a successful Iranian plastic surgeon in Beverly Hills, she lives with her overbearing mother and empathetic father. When she falls in love with a mysterious young man who lives in a lighthouse in Northern California, a secret unravels and cultures clash, challenging all the tradition Shirin grew up with - and she re-discovers herself in the process.

== Cast ==
- George Wallace as Officer Washington
- Amy Madigan as Rachel Harson
- Nazanin Boniadi as Shirin
- Riley Smith as William
- Marshall Manesh as Nader
- Maz Jobrani as Mike
- Anahita Khalatbari as Maryam
- Max Amini as Ed
- Annie Little as Vicky
- Samantha Colburn as Helen
- Steven Schub as Rick
- Sam Golzari as Ben
- Nick Soper as Officer Clifford
- Andy Madadian as Andy
- Mervin Gilbert as Dale
- Aycil Yeltan as Sasha
- Carryl Lynn as Sylvia

== Reception ==
On the review aggregator website Rotten Tomatoes, 21% of 14 critics' reviews are positive. Metacritic, which uses a weighted average, assigned the film a score of 29 out of 100, based on 9 critics, indicating "generally unfavorable" reviews.
