= One and Eight =

- Traditional Chinese: 一個和八個
- Simplified Chinese: 一个和八个
- Hanyu Pinyin: Yīge hé bāge
- Directed by: Zhang Junzhao
- Written by: Wang Jicheng; Zhang Ziliang; Guo Xiaochuan (poem)
- Starring: Tao Zeru; Chen Daoming; Lu Xiaoyan
- Cinematography: Zhang Yimou; Xiao Feng
- Edited by: Ci Minghe
- Production company: Guangxi Film Studio
- Release date: 1983
- Running time: 90 minutes
- Country: China
- Language: Mandarin

One and Eight is a 1983 Chinese film. The film tells the story of eight criminals and a deserting officer in the Chinese Communist Party's Eighth Route Army caught in the midst of the Second Sino-Japanese War. Directed by Zhang Junzhao, One and Eight also features cinematography by the soon-to-be-acclaimed Zhang Yimou and stars Chen Daoming. It is based on an epic poem by Guo Xiaochuan.

== Significance ==
One and Eight constituted an early collaboration between the graduates of the 1982 class of the Beijing Film Academy, notably classmates Zhang Junzhao and Zhang Yimou. Both Zhang Yimou and Zhang Junzhao were members of the Fifth Generation, or the first major group of filmmakers to graduate after the end of the Cultural Revolution. As such, One and Eight is often considered one of the first films to move towards the more artistic and experimental mentality that is the hallmark of Chinese cinema of the 1980s.

In particular, the film's focus on humanism and personal conflicts signaled a paradigm shift away from the propagandistic films of the Cultural Revolution.

== Plot ==
The film is set in 1941 during the Second Sino-Japanese War. The events portrayed take place in Hebei province.

The "Eight" of the title are eight prisoners of the Eighth Route Army and have committed various crimes, including banditry, informing, and desertion. The "One" is the character Wang Jin (played by Chen Daoming), an army officer who has been falsely accused of treason after he became separated from his unit.

Over the course of the story, the ragtag band of the One and the Eight develop camaraderie and a sense of loyalty to the nation. A major turning point comes when they encounter a massacre at a village and decide to give up their selfish pursuits and understand the need for collective action. Wang's righteousness and devotion to the Chinese Communist Party and its principles inspire the Eight.
