= The Key (1983 film) =

- Theatrical release poster
- Directed by: Tinto Brass
- Screenplay by: Tinto Brass
- Based on: Kagi by Junichiro Tanizaki
- Produced by: Giovanni Bertolucci
- Starring: Frank Finlay; Stefania Sandrelli; Franco Branciaroli; Barbara Cupisti
- Cinematography: Silvano Ippoliti
- Edited by: Tinto Brass
- Music by: Ennio Morricone
- Production company: San Francisco Film
- Release date: 1983
- Running time: 116 minutes
- Country: Italy
- Languages: Italian; English
- Budget: $200,000

The Key (Italian: La chiave) is an Italian erotic film directed by Tinto Brass. Set in Venice under the fascist regime in the early months of 1940, it recounts a tale of a voluptuous woman in her forties who is unable to respond to her husband but undergoes a belated sexual awakening with her daughter's fiancé, which enables her to please her husband at last. The film caused scandal in some quarters because it contains several explicit shots of nudity (characterised by certain critics as "gynecological") and sex scenes involving the well-known actress Stefania Sandrelli. However, the film ultimately obtained a decent level of commercial success.

== Plot ==
Desperate after 20 years of marriage at his inability to arouse his beautiful but inhibited wife Teresa, retired art teacher Nino Rolfe records his love for her and his frustration in a diary that he locks in his desk, leaving the key for her to find. When she passes out after a party, he undresses her and their daughter's fiancé Laszlo administers an injection. Laszlo, who surreptitiously fondled her exposed buttock during the injection, is also seized with desire for Teresa.

Nino starts taking secret photographs of Teresa asleep but the only person he can find to develop them is Laszlo, who starts a steamy affair with Teresa. His fiancée Lisa reproaches her mother but remains complicit by not breaking off with Laszlo, who also begins taking provocative pictures of Teresa. In addition, Teresa starts keeping a diary of her feelings, which she makes sure Nino can find. So a web of guilty relationships is formed, recorded in supposedly secret diaries and photographs. It ends when Teresa, liberated by her wild cavortings with Laszlo, feels able to give pleasure to Nino as well. The effort gives him a stroke, and the story ends with his funeral, held on the day Italy enters World War II.

== Production ==
The Key is based on Kagi by Tanizaki Junichiro. The book had been previously adapted to film by Kon Ichikawa in Odd Obsession. Brass' film relocates the story to Mussolini's time and changes the setting to Venice.

== Cast ==
- Stefania Sandrelli: Teresa Rolfe
- Frank Finlay: Nino Rolfe
- Barbara Cupisti: Lisa Rolfe
- Franco Branciaroli: Laszlo Apony
- Ricky Tognazzi: a student
- Ugo Tognazzi: a drunk

== Reception ==
From a contemporary review, the Monthly Film Bulletin found that "Despite its solid production values, The Key has a reassuringly uninflated approach to its material" and that the film "is a much more creative use of genre than many more 'respectable' commercial attempts."

In a retrospective review, Sight & Sound stated that "Brass makes no apology for underlining a personal preference (common to the pornography enjoyed by his generation) for frequent displays of stockings and suspenders, wispy pubic hair and above all the female posterior" while stating that "visually the film plays rewarding games with reflections and colours. But the political ambience is weakly conveyed in comparison with Bertolucci's The Conformist (1970), with which The Key shares its period, Sandrelli and producer Giovanni Bertolucci."

== See also ==
- List of Italian films of 1983
