= Anahita Khalatbari =

- آناهیتا خلعتبری
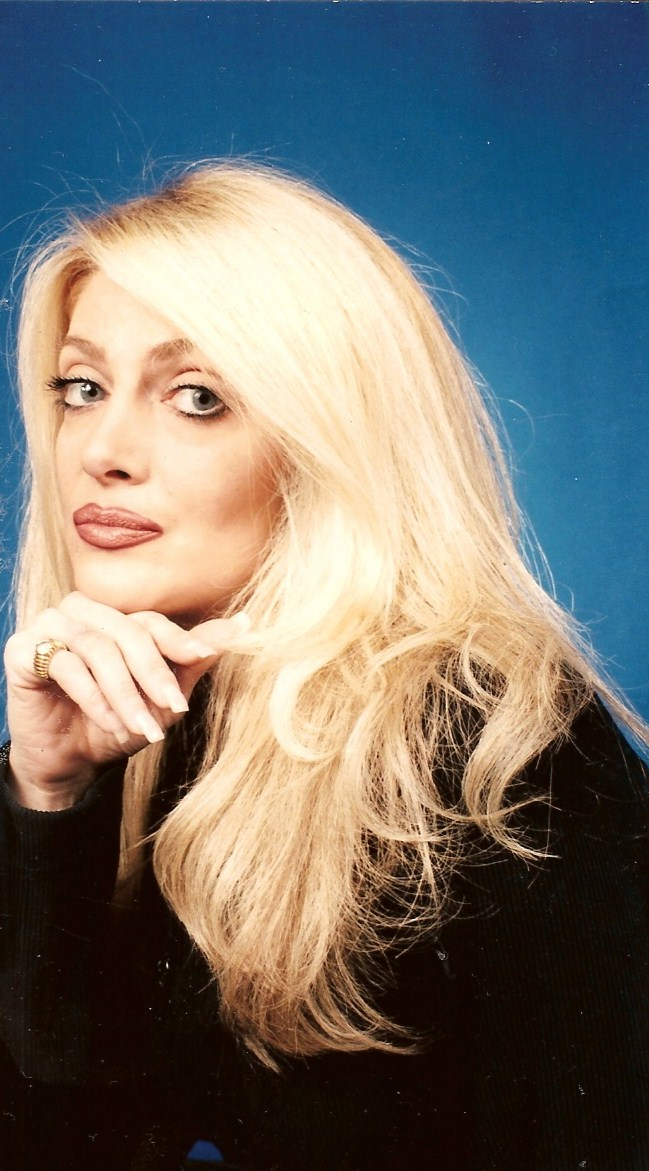
- Khalatbari in 2006
- Born: Tehran, Iran
- Other name: Barbie
- Occupations: Journalist, Actress, TV Personality, News Anchor
- Website: www.anahitakhalatbari.com

Anita Khalatbari is an American journalist, news anchor, reporter, actress, TV show host of Iranian descent. She was brought up and educated in Britain. Her great-grandfather Sepahdar A'zam was of the Royal Khalatbari family and served as Prime Minister for 4 terms (1909). With the advent of the Pahlavi dynasty and the Reza Khans, imposed by the British in the 1920s, Sepahdar Azam was placed under increased political pressure. Much of his property was seized by the new government in an attempt to control his wealth and his power. Sepahdar Azam committed suicide.

== Education ==
Khalatbari studied politics and sociology in London, England but later moved to California to pursue her passion in the fields of broadcasting and acting despite her conservative father's disapproval.

== Career ==
Throughout her career, Anahita Khalatbari has interviewed hundreds of personalities including politicians, physicians, surgeons and celebrities such as former president of Israel, Senator Roderick D. Wright, Sheriff Lee Baca, former mayor of Los Angeles Antonio Villaraigosa, Larry King and many more.

Her acting career includes appearing as plaintiff Jennifer Hardison opposite attorney Gloria Allred in the re-enactment Court TV Show "We the People" on NBC Channel. Khalatbari has also starred in the romantic comedy Shirin in Love, directed by Ramin Niami. Anita Khalatbari's superb acting skills in the movie "Shirin in Love" were praised by the great film critic Roger Ebert and compared to Faye Dunaway's. Roger Ebert says; "Anahita Kalatbari gives a turn that's like a more deliberately comic version of Faye Dunaway's maternal control freak in "Mommie Dearest." It's that good, and doubly remarkable in being Kalatbari's first screen role".
