= The Bottles =

- Origin: Los Angeles, California
- Genres: Power pop
- Years active: 1979
- Label: MCA
- Past members: Peter Bayless (vocals, bass guitar, guitar); Jefery Levy (guitar, bass guitar, keyboards); Andy Dworkin (drums); Kendall Roclord Schmidt (keyboards)

The Bottles were a power pop duo from Los Angeles, California, consisting of Peter Bayless and Jefery Levy. They released one self-titled album in September 1979 on MCA Records, produced by Levy and preceded by the single "I Don't Wanna Be Your Man".

== History ==
The Bottles began when Jon Sheinberg, the son of Sidney Sheinberg, was managing Levy and giving him advice. Sheinberg told Levy about MCA's then-vice president of artists and repertoire, Denny Rosencrantz, and Levy contacted him and made a deal as his own producer. As a result, Levy recorded three songs for $500, one of which was recorded with Bayless. MCA responded by giving the band a one-album contract.

== Reception ==
A review of the band's self-titled album in Billboard stated that "Each tune is a well-crafted, melodic song, many containing witty lyrics and a sense of humor." Robert Christgau was more critical in Christgau's Record Guide: Rock Albums of the Seventies (1981), writing, "All that's new wave (much less punk) about this aspiring El Lay songwriting duo is their name and their promo. Now they need a hit single so they can be remembered as a flash in the pan." The Los Angeles Times negatively reviewed the band's performance as an opening act at the Santa Monica Civic Auditorium, but Sheinberg said that this review was "unfair", adding that "Every trade paper and everyone else gave us rave reviews."

== Discography ==
- The Bottles (MCA, 1979)
