= Bai Ling =

Chinese-American actress and musician (born 1966)

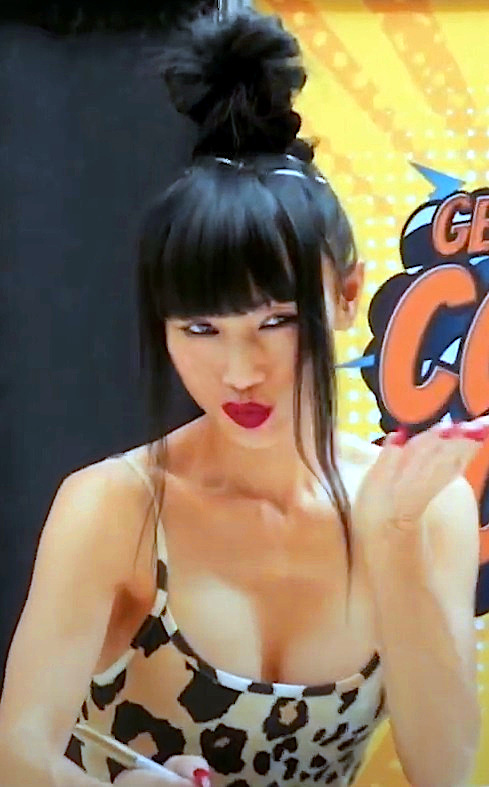
- Bai in 2019
- Born: October 10, 1966 (age 59); Chengdu, Sichuan, China
- Occupation: Actress
- Years active: 1981–present
- Parent(s): Bai Yuxiang; Chen Binbin

Chinese name
- Traditional Chinese: 白靈
- Simplified Chinese: 白灵
Transcriptions
Standard Mandarin
- Hanyu Pinyin: Bái Líng
- IPA: [pǎɪ lǐŋ]

Bai Ling (Chinese: 白灵; born October 10, 1966) is a Chinese American actress and musician. After acting in numerous Chinese productions, she played small roles in American films such as The Crow (1994) and Nixon (1995) before starring as the female lead in Red Corner (1997). She then went on to portray roles in Wild Wild West (1999), Anna and the King (1999), Taxi 3 (2003), Sky Captain and the World of Tomorrow (2004), Southland Tales (2006), and Crank: High Voltage (2009).

She won the Best Supporting Actress awards at the 2004 Hong Kong Film Awards and the 2004 Golden Horse Awards in Taiwan for her role in Dumplings (2004).

== Early life ==
Bai was born in Chengdu. Her father, Bai Yuxiang (白玉祥), was a musician in the People's Liberation Army, and later a music teacher. Her mother, Chen Binbin (陈彬彬), was a dancer, stage actress, and literature teacher at Sichuan University; Bai's maternal grandfather was a military officer of the Kuomintang army, thus was persecuted during the Cultural Revolution. In the early 1980s, Bai Ling's parents divorced, and her mother married renowned writer Xu Chi. Bai Ling has one older sister, Bai Jie (白洁), who works for the Chinese tax bureau, and a younger brother, Bai Chen (白陈), who emigrated to Japan and works for an American company.

Bai has described herself as a very shy child who found that she best expressed herself through acting and performing. During the Cultural Revolution (1966–1976), she learned how to perform by participating in eight model plays, at her elementary school shows. After her graduation from middle school, Bai was sent to do labor work at Shuangliu, on the outskirts of Chengdu.

In 1978, after graduating from high school, she passed the People's Liberation Army's exams, and became an artist soldier in Nyingchi Prefecture, Tibet. Her main activity there was entertaining in the musical theater. She also served briefly as an Army nurse. Bai later stated that during her time in Tibet, other female performers and she were regularly plied with alcohol and sexually abused by older male officers, including one instance of rape that led to a pregnancy she aborted. She cites this period of sexual abuse for her subsequent struggles with alcohol addiction. Subsequently, Bai spent some time in a mental hospital.

Soon after her release from the hospital, in 1981, Bai joined People's Art Theater of Chengdu, and became a professional actress. Her performance as a young man in the stage play Yueqin and Little Tiger drew the attention of movie director Teng Wenji (滕文骥), which gained her first movie role in On the Beach (1985), as a village girl who becomes a factory worker and struggled against her father's will for her to marry her cousin.

She temporarily moved to New York in 1991 to attend New York University's film department as a visiting scholar, but later obtained a special visa that allowed her to remain in the United States until she became a U.S. citizen in 1999.

== Career ==
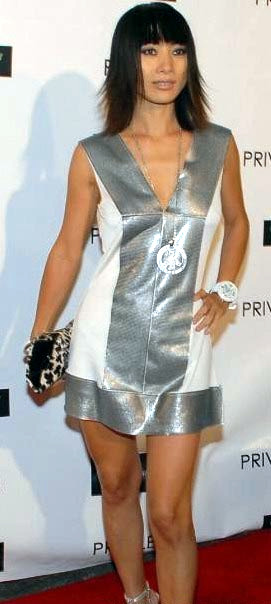
Bai at a party in July 2007

Bai began her acting career in China, appearing in several Chinese feature films. In 1984, she made her film debut as a fishing village girl in the movie On the Beach (海滩). Later, she filmed several other movies, including Suspended Sentence (缓期执行), Yueyue (月月), and Tears in Suzhou (泪洒姑苏) without much attention. She became famous after playing a girl with a psychological disorder who has an affair with her doctor, in the film The Shining Arc (弧光), directed by Zhang Junzhao (张军钊), her most highly acclaimed role in the Chinese film industry. In 1991, Bai moved to the United States, where she appeared in a number of American films and television shows including the legendary soap opera Guiding Light alongside actress Melina Kanakaredes.

Bai's first major American film role was in The Crow (1994), where she played the half sister and lover of the main villain, Top Dollar. In 1997, she played the lead female role, opposite Richard Gere, in the American film Red Corner. The New York Times praised Bai Ling's performance, saying that she gave the film "not only grace, but also substantial gravity". For her role in Red Corner, she received the National Board of Review Freedom for Breakthrough Female Performance and the San Diego Film Critics Society Award for Best Actress. The film was critical of human rights abuse in China, and as a result, Bai Ling's Chinese citizenship was revoked. She later became a U.S. citizen.

Bai was named one of People's 50 Most Beautiful People in the World in 1998. She shaved off her hair, which was longer than 36 in (90 cm) for her role in Anna and the King, and is widely known in Thailand as "Tuptim", her character's name from the film, though the film is officially banned because of its depiction of the King of Siam. She filmed scenes for Star Wars: Episode III – Revenge of the Sith (2005) as Senator Bana Breemu, but her role was cut during editing. She claimed that this was because she appeared in the June 2005 issue of Playboy magazine, whose appearance on newsstands coincided with the movie's May 2005 release, but director George Lucas denied this, stating that the cut had been made more than a year earlier. Her scenes were included in the deleted scenes feature of the DVD release.

In 2004, Bai made a comeback to Chinese cinema, co-starring with Hong Kong actress Miriam Yeung in independent filmmaker Fruit Chan's horror thriller Dumplings. Her portrayal of the villainous local chef Aunt Mei in the film earned her the 2005 Hong Kong Film Award for Best Supporting Actress, and led to her renewed popularity among the Chinese film audience. In the same year, she also received critical acclaim for her performance in another independent movie, The Beautiful Country, co-starring Nick Nolte, and directed by Hans Petter Moland.

Later in 2005, Bai was a member of the official jury at the 55th Berlin International Film Festival. On television, she was a cast member on the VH1 program called But Can They Sing?. Also in 2005, Bai guest-starred in season two of Entourage in which she played a love interest of Vincent Chase (Adrian Grenier).

In 2007, she starred as Coco in the film adaptation of the controversial Chinese contemporary novel Shanghai Baby, which premiered at Cannes Film Festival, and also guest-starred in one episode ("Stranger in a Strange Land") of the show Lost. Since 2007, she has appeared in a number of films, including Love Ranch, Crank: High Voltage, and A Beautiful Life, although she became more well known for her red-carpet appearances and outrageous fashions.

In 2013, Bai enjoyed a career resurgence with the movie The Gauntlet (a.k.a. Game of Assassins), which earned her the Best Actress award at the Los Angeles Cinema Festival of Hollywood, and at the 2014 Asians On Film Festival. Also, for Speed Dragon, she received the Best Feature Film Award at the New York International Independent Film and Video Festival. In late 2014, Bai starred alongside David Arquette in The Key, Jefery Levy's adaptation of the novel by Jun'ichirō Tanizaki. In October 2014, Bai was a member of the jury in the "India Gold 2014" section of the Mumbai Film Festival.

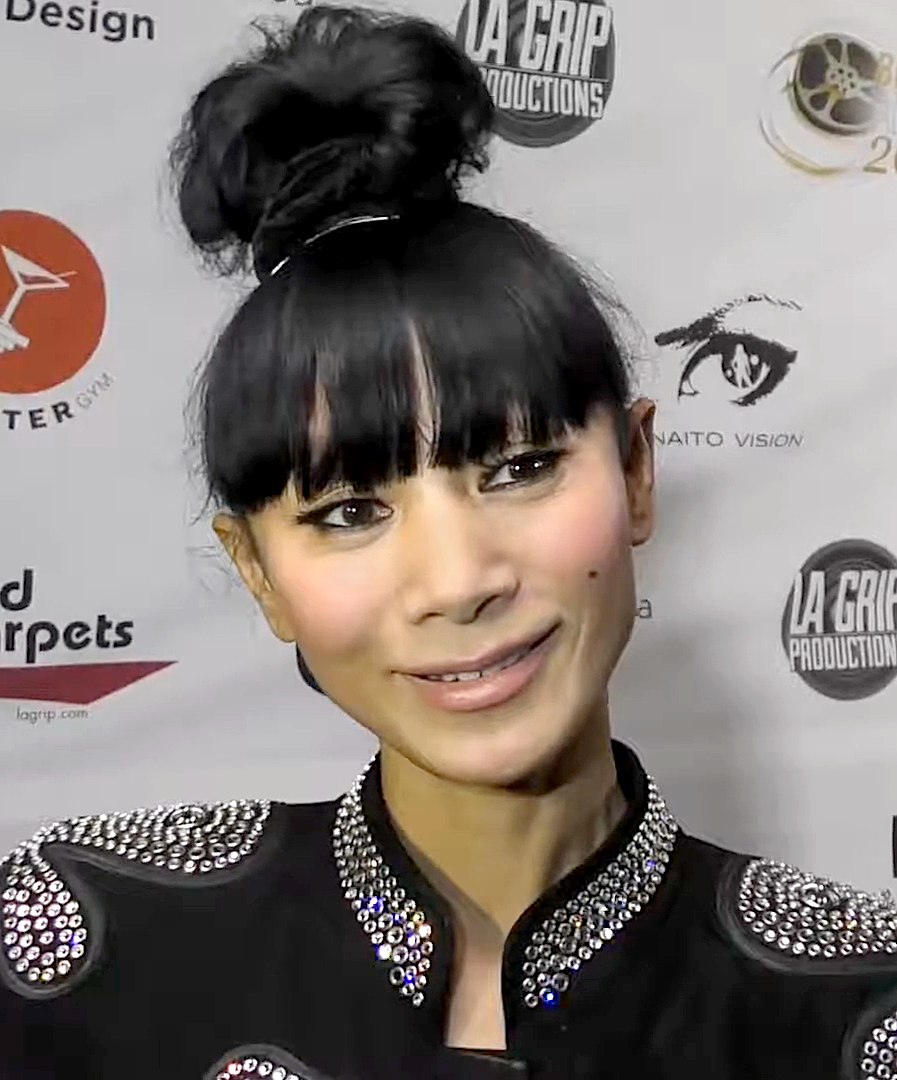
Bai in 2016

In 2017, Bai took part in the short film To Pimp a Butterfly by Rui Cui, which won her second Best Actress win at the Asians On Film Festival. Subsequently, in 2019, after 15 years since their collaboration in Dumplings, director Fruit Chan and Bai worked together again in The Abortionist (墮胎師). For her performance Bai obtained her second nomination at the Golden Horse Film Festival as Best Actress. She also enjoyed a new success in independent horror movies such as Exorcism at 60,000 Feet (2019) and Unspeakable: Beyond the Wall of Sleep (2024). Bai was also awarded in Italy the Milan Gold Awards Best Actress prize for Jack Be Nimble (2022), another horror film.

== Personal life ==
On February 14, 2008, Bai was arrested at Los Angeles International Airport for shoplifting. Bai stated it was an "emotionally crazy" day due to the breakup of a relationship, and was ordered to pay a fine and penalties after pleading guilty in March 2008 to disturbing the peace.

In a 2009 interview, Bai claimed that she is from the Moon, where her grandmother lives. "I'm not really in reality. I'm in my own universe and my mind is a million miles somewhere else", she stated, further explaining: "Why I feel like I come from the Moon is because my mother told me I was found somewhere". She believes that when she looks up at the Moon, she can often spot her grandmother there, still living in her childhood home.

In 2011, she appeared in the fifth season of the VH1 reality television series Celebrity Rehab with Dr. Drew, which documented her recovery from alcohol addiction. In a 2011 interview regarding her public image and troubles over the years, she stated:

I accidentally or innocently destroyed the beautiful Bai Ling that everybody loved, that beautiful, talented actress. Instead, the media brought me out as this crazy slut showing her nipples everywhere. I become this character the pop culture Hollywood machine created. Somehow, I become a victim to that image.

When Bai first came to the United States, before she became fluent in English, she was initially confused by people asking if she was bi (as in bisexual), as the word is homophonous with "Bai". After the miscommunication was clarified, she subsequently affirmed that she is bisexual and that gender is not relevant to who she is attracted to.

== Filmography ==
=== Film ===
Year	Film	Role	Notes/Ref.
1984	Hai tan (海滩)	Lu Xiao Mei (陆小妹)	
1985	Lei sa Gu Su (泪洒姑苏)	Wang Lingjuan (王怜娟)	
1986	Yue Yue (月月)	Yue Yue (月月)	
1987	College Student Stories (大学生轶事)	Xiao Qian (小钱)	
1987	Shan cun feng yue (山村风月)	Guier (桂儿)	
1988	Wu qiang qiang shou (无枪枪手)	Yan Hong (严红)	
1989	The Shining Arc (弧光)	Jing Huan (景唤)	
1989	Fei fa chi qiang zhe (非法持枪者)	Nu Siji	
1992	Pen Pals	Sharice	
1992	Escape from China	Peasant Woman (voice)	
1994	The Crow	Myca	
1994	Dead Funny	Norriko	
1995	Dead Weekend	Amelia A.	TV movie
1995	Nixon	Chinese Interpreter	
1995	Nobody's Girls: Five Women of the West	Mary Bong	
1997	Red Corner	Shen Yuelin	
1998	Somewhere in the City	Lu-Lu	
1999	Row Your Boat	Chun Hua	
1999	Wild Wild West	Miss Mae Lee East	
1999	Anna and the King	Tuptim	
2001	Shaolin Soccer	Mui (voice)	
2001	The Breed	Lucy Westenra	
2002	Face	Kim	
2002	Storm Watch	Skylar	
2002	Point of Origin	Wanda Orr	TV movie
2003	Taxi 3	Qiu	
2003	The Extreme Team	R.J.	
2003	Paris	Linda/Shen Li	
2004	My Baby's Daddy	XiXi	
2004	The Beautiful Country	Ling	
2004	Sky Captain and the World of Tomorrow	Mysterious Woman	
2004	She Hate Me	Oni	
2004	Dumplings (餃子)	Mei	
2004	Three... Extremes (三更2)	Mei	
2005	Star Wars: Episode III – Revenge of the Sith	Senator Bana Breemu	
2005	Lords of Dogtown	Punky Photographer	
2005	Nomad	Gaukhar (voice)	
2005	Edmond	Peep Show Girl	
2006	Man About Town	Barbi Ling	
2006	Southland Tales	Serpentine	
2007	Living & Dying	Nadia	
2007	Shanghai Baby	Coco	
2007	The Gene Generation	Michelle	
2008	Toxic	Lena	
2008	The Hustle	Han	
2008	A Beautiful Life	Esther	
2008	Dim Sum Funeral	Deedee	
2009	Crank: High Voltage	Ria	
2010	Pai mai chun tian (拍卖春天)	Zhang Qian (张倩)	
2010	Magic Man	Samantha	
2010	Love Ranch	Samantha	
2010	Circle of Pain	Victoria Rualan	Video
2010	The Confidant	Black	
2010	Chain Letter	Jai Pham	
2010	Petty Cash	Coco	
2010	Locked Down	Guard Flores	
2010	The Lazarus Papers	Kyo	
2011	The Bad Penny	Nok	
2012	Clash of the Empires	Laylan	Video
2012	Yellow Hill: The Stranger's Tale	The Stranger	Short
2013	Game of Assassins	Kim Lee	
2013	American Girls	Amanda Chen	
2013	Blood Shed	Lucy	
2014	The Key	Ida	
2014	Vultures in the Void	Deadspeed	Short
2015	Terms & Conditions	The Bodyguard	
2015	6 Ways to Sundown	June Lee	
2015	ABCs of Superheroes	Galvana	
2015	Boned	The Mistress	
2015	Samurai Cop 2: Deadly Vengeance	Doggé	
2015	Sacred Blood	Lilly	
2015	Call Me King	Li Soo	
2015	Everlasting	Cristiane	
2016	Beyond the Game	Tara	
2016	Shanghai Wang	Madame Xin	
2016	Better Criminal	Miss Jasmine Feng	
2017	To Pimp a Butterfly	Butterfly (Mother)	Short
2017	Sharknado 5: Global Swarming	Mira	TV movie
2017	Andover	Professor Huan	
2017	Maximum Impact	Scanlon	
2018	Tang ren jie tan an 2	Aaimali Kunana	
2018	Dead Ringer	April	
2018	Accidental Diplomats	The Translator	Short
2019	Exorcism at 60,000 Feet	Amanda	
2019	Speed Dragon	Jackie	
2019	The Final Level: Escaping Rancala	Challenger	
2019	The Abortionist (墮胎師)	Jane	
2020	The Legion	Amirah	
2020	Airliner Sky Battle	Dr. Meili Liu	
2021	Venus as a Boy	Cleo	
2021	The Expat	NBI Operative	
2021	Fast Vengeance	Lucid Lucy	
2021	Night Caller	Jade Mei	
2021	Hustle Down	Crystal	
2021	Banking on Christmas	Judith	
2021	Painted Beauty	Biyu	
2022	Jack Be Nimble	Nurse Edmond	
2022	Lockdown	Cherry	
2022	Pig Killer	Brenda	
2023	Johnny & Clyde	Zhang	
2023	My Red Neck Neighbor	Shumai	
2023	Buckle Up	Scorpio	
2023	Back Home	Mother of Heung Wing	
2023	Phoenix	Scavenger	
2023	Scalper	Jade Mei	
2023	Mega Ape	Dr. Li	
2024	The Haunted Studio	Cornelia	
2024	Baba Yaga	Scorpio	
2024	The Keepers of the 5 Kingdoms	Kuang	
2024	The Omicron Killer	Nurse Nancy	
2024	Unspeakable: Beyond the Wall of Sleep	Dr. Fenton	
2024	Down Below	Thorn	
2025	Werewolf Game	Demi	

=== Television ===
Year	Title	Role	Notes
1993	The Guiding Light	Lin	Episode: "Episode #1.11946"
1993	Homicide: Life on the Street	Teri Chow	Episode: "And the Rockets' Dead Glare"
1995	The Cosby Mysteries	Dr. Valerie Chong	Episode: "The Hit Parade"
1998	Touched by an Angel	Jean Chang	Episode: "The Spirit of Liberty Moon: Part 1 & 2"
2000	Angel	Jhiera	Episode: "She"
2000	The Wild Thornberrys	Mother Panda/Mei-Mei (voice)	Guest Cast: Season 2–3
2001	The Chris Isaak Show	Herself	Episode: "Freud's Dilemma"
2001	The Monkey King	Guanyin	Episode: "Part 1 & 2"
2003	Jake 2.0	Mei Ling	Episode: "Cater Waiter"
2005	But Can They Sing?	Herself	Main Cast
2005	Entourage	Li Lei	Episode: "Chinatown"
2007	Lost	Achara	Episode: "Stranger in a Strange Land"
2007	The Unit	Princess	Episode: "Freefall"
2009	Free Radio	Herself	Episode: "KDOG"
2011	Celebrity Rehab with Dr. Drew	Herself	Main Cast: Season 5
2012	The Unemployment of Danny London	Herself	Episode: "London's Labyrinth"
2012	Hawaii Five-0	Esmeralda	Episode: "Popilikia"
2021	Transcendent Realms	Shadow	Main Cast
2023	Barbee Rehab	Chinese Barbee	Main Cast
2023	Great Kills	Bai	Main Cast

=== Documentary ===
Year	Title
2016	Enter the Samurai

=== Video games ===
Year	Title	Role	Notes
2006	Scarface: The World Is Yours	Ana Yamada - U-Gin Bar Manager (voice)	

=== Music video appearances ===
Year	Title	Artist	Notes
1998	"Please"	Chris Isaak	Herself

== Discography ==
=== Singles ===
- "Rehab" (2011)
- "U Touch Me, I Don't Know U" (2011)
- "I Love U My Valentine" (2012)
- "Tuesday Night 8pm" (2012)

=== Music videos ===
- "Rehab" (2011)
- "U Touch Me, I Don't Know U" (2011)
- "I Love U My Valentine" (2012)
- "Tuesday Night 8pm" (2012)
