= Red Corner =

1997 American mystery thriller film

- Theatrical release poster
- Directed by: Jon Avnet
- Written by: Robert King
- Produced by: Jon Avnet; Jordan Kerner; Charles Mulvehill; Rosalie Swedlin
- Starring: Richard Gere; Bai Ling; Bradley Whitford
- Cinematography: Karl Walter Lindenlaub
- Edited by: Peter E. Berger
- Music by: Thomas Newman
- Production companies: Metro-Goldwyn-Mayer Pictures; Avnet/Kerner Productions
- Distributed by: MGM Distribution Co. (United States); United International Pictures (International)
- Release date: October 31, 1997 (United States)
- Running time: 122 minutes
- Country: United States
- Language: English
- Budget: $48 million
- Box office: $22.4 million

Red Corner is a 1997 American mystery thriller film directed by Jon Avnet, and starring Richard Gere, Bai Ling and Bradley Whitford. Written by Robert King, the film is about an American businessman in China who ends up wrongfully on trial for murder. His only hope of exoneration and freedom is a female defense lawyer from the country. The film received the 1997 National Board of Review Freedom of Expression Award (Richard Gere, Jon Avnet) and the NBR Award for Breakthrough Female Performance (Bai Ling). Ling also won the San Diego Film Critics Society Award for Best Actress.

== Plot ==
Wealthy American businessman Jack Moore is on a trip to China attempting to put together a satellite communications deal as part of a joint venture with the Chinese government.

Before the deal can be finalized, Moore is framed for the murder of a powerful Chinese general's daughter, and the satellite contract is instead awarded to Moore's competitor, Gerhardt Hoffman.

Moore's court-appointed lawyer Shen Yuelin initially does not believe his claims of innocence, but the pair gradually unearth evidence that not only vindicates Moore, but implicates powerful figures within the Chinese central government administration, exposing undeniable conspiracy and corruption. Shen becomes convinced that Moore is innocent when an attempt is made on his life and he is forced to take refuge in the American Embassy for a while.

Shen manages to convince several high-ranking Chinese officials to release evidence that proves Moore's innocence. Moore is quickly released from prison while the conspirators responsible for framing him are arrested although one of the conspirators is shot dead in the courtroom by the victim's father. He also apologizes to Moore for having caused him so many problems.

At the airport, Moore asks Shen to leave China with him, but she decides to stay, as the case has opened her eyes to the injustices rife throughout China. She does admit, however, that meeting Moore has changed her life, and she now considers him a part of her family. They both share a heartfelt hug on the airport runway, before Moore departs for America.

== Cast ==
- Richard Gere as Jack Moore
- Bai Ling as Shen Yuelin
- Bradley Whitford as Bob Ghery
- Byron Mann as Lin Dan
- Peter Donat as David McAndrews
- Robert Stanton as Ed Pratt
- Tsai Chin as Chairman Xu
- James Hong as Lin Shou
- Tzi Ma as Li Cheng
- Ulrich Matschoss as Gerhardt Hoffman
- Richard Venture as Ambassador Reed
- Jessey Meng as Hong Ling
- Roger Yuan as Huan Minglu
- Chi Yu Li as General Hong
- Henry O as Procurator General Yang
- Kent Faulcon as Marine Guard
- Jia Yao Li as Director Liu
- Yukun Lu as Director Liu's Associate
- Robert Lin as Director Liu's Interpreter

== Production ==
An earlier draft of the script had been worked on by Joan Didion and John Gregory Dunne.

In December 1996, it was announced Richard Gere would be shooting Red Corner in March 1997.

While in production, director Jon Avnet filed suit against Metro-Goldwyn-Mayer after they refused to sign the agreed revised budget ($54 million for shooting in Los Angeles following abandoning a $49 million shoot on location in China which also included recognition of Avent's producer and director's participation including final cut privilege.

Red Corner was shot in Los Angeles using elaborate sets and CGI rendering of 3,500 still shots and two minutes of footage from China. In order to establish the film's verisimilitude, several Beijing actors were brought to the United States on visas for filming. The judicial and penitentiary scenes were recreated from descriptions given by attorneys and judges practicing in China and the video segment showing the execution of Chinese prisoners was an actual execution. The individuals providing the video and the descriptions to Avnet and his staff took a significant risk by providing it.

Filming began March 17, 1997 and was completed on July 10, 1997.

== Reception ==
Janet Maslin of The New York Times cited the Hitchcockian setup, that succeeds "in giving the word conviction double meaning." fusing "curiosity about China with entertainment value."

Roger Ebert of the Chicago Sun-Times described Red Corner as "a contrived and cumbersome thriller designed to showcase Richard Gere's unhappiness with Red China, which it does with such thoroughness that story and characters are enveloped in the gloom. The Chinese do this better to themselves. Unlike such Chinese-made films as The Blue Kite, and To Live which criticize China with an insider's knowledge and detail, Red Corner plays like a xenophobic travelogue crossed with Perry Mason."

Cynthia Langston of Film Journal International responded to the film, "So unrealistic, so contrived and so blatantly 'Hollywood' that Gere can't possibly imagine he's opening any eyes to the problem, or any doors to its solution, for that matter."

In his review in the Los Angeles Times, Kenneth Turan called Red Corner a "sluggish and uninteresting melodrama that is further hampered by the delusion that it is saying something significant. But its one-man-against-the-system story is hackneyed and the points it thinks it's making about the state of justice in China are hampered by an attitude that verges on the xenophobic."

Salon film critic Andrew O'Hehir noted that the movie's subtext "swallows its story, until all that is left is Gere's superior virtue, intermixed with his superior virility—both of which are greatly appreciated by the evidently underserviced Chinese female population." O'Hehir also noted that the film reinforces the infamous Western stereotypes of Asian female sexuality (as in those of The World of Suzie Wong) as well as the hoariest stereotyping.

On Rotten Tomatoes the film has an approval rating of 27% based on reviews from 22 critics.

Total Film gave a 3 out of 5 star rating, stating that Red Corner was "A semi-powerful thriller let down by pedestrian direction and a lacklustre Richard Gere. Even so, newcomer Bai Ling and an unblinking stare at the Draconian Chinese legal system prevent Red Corner from being an open-and-shut case" and describes some scenes depicting the harsh treatment of the Chinese legal system as "thought provoking" yet describes the rest as only "mildly entertaining".

== Censorship ==
The film was censored in the People's Republic of China due to its unflattering portrayal of China's judicial system. Gere was vocal about how the film is "... a different angle of dealing with Tibet" and a political statement about China's oppression of Tibet, even though Tibet is never mentioned in the film. Chinese officials visited MGM, the film's studio and distributor, to ask why the studio was releasing the movie during the U.S. visit of Chinese president Jiang Zemin.

A memo issued by China's Ministry of Radio, Film and Television, sent to Jack Valenti, president of the Motion Picture Association of America and addressed to Chinese film offices, banned cooperation with the Hollywood studios that produced Red Corner (MGM/United Artists), Kundun (Disney) and Seven Years In Tibet (Columbia TriStar), as films that "viciously attack China {and} hurt Chinese people's feelings... Although . . . all kinds of efforts have been made, those three American companies are still pushing out above films... In order to protect Chinese national overall interests, it has been decided that all business cooperation with these three companies to be ceased temporarily without exception." Gere claims his political activism regarding Tibet and his friendship with the Dalai Lama has disrupted his film career and affects the financing, production and distribution of films he is connected with.

Testifying before the United States Senate Committee on Finance, Subcommittee on International Trade, Customs, and Global Competitiveness on "censorship as a non-tariff barrier" in 2020, Gere stated that economic interests compel studios to avoid social and political issues Hollywood once addressed, "Imagine Marty Scorsese's Kundun, about the life of the Dalai Lama, or my own film Red Corner, which is highly critical of the Chinese legal system. Imagine them being made today. It wouldn't happen."

== See also ==
- List of TV and films with critiques of Chinese Communist Party
