= Boluonuo =

Boluonuo 波罗诺 ᠪᠣᠯᡠᠣ ᠨᠣᠣᡵ
- Town
- Location in Hebei Location in China
- Coordinates: 41°05′46″N 117°19′42″E
- Country: People's Republic of China
- Province: Hebei
- Prefecture-level city: Chengde
- Autonomous county: Fengning

Area
  - Total: 160.9 km^{2} (62.1 sq mi)

Population (2010)
  - Total: 10,147
  - Density: 63.06/km^{2} (163.3/sq mi)
- Time zone: UTC+8 (China Standard)

Boluonuo (Chinese: 波罗诺镇; pinyin: Bōluónuò Zhèn), Manchu: ᠪᠣᠯᡠᠣ
ᠨᠣᠣᡵ
ᡴᠠᡩᠠᠯᠠᠩᡤᠠ; Möllendorff romanization: boluo noor kadalangga) also pronounced Boluonao, is a town located in Fengning Manchu Autonomous County, Chengde, Hebei, China.

== Toponymy ==
Prior to the Qing dynasty, the area was primarily inhabited by nomadic Mongols, who called the area Bolunsinuo'er (Chinese: 博伦斯诺尔; pinyin: Bólúnsīnuò'ěr), from the Mongol word for "spring". The Han Chinese who moved to the area referred to it as Bolunao (Chinese: 博伦脑; pinyin: Bólúnnào), derived from the Mongol name. Eventually, this was changed to Boluonuo (Chinese: 波罗诺; pinyin: Bōluónuò), its current name, although some locals pronounce it as Boluonao, which is influenced from its prior name.

== History ==
The area of present-day Boluonuo was historically part of the ancient state of Yan.

Portions of the Han dynasty's Great Wall run through the village of Laomiaoying Village (Chinese: 老庙营村) within the town.

During the Northern Wei dynasty, it belonged to Fangcheng County (simplified Chinese: 方城县; traditional Chinese: 方城縣; pinyin: Fāngchéng Xiàn), in An Prefecture.

During the Liao Dynasty, it belonged to Xinghua County (simplified Chinese: 兴化县; traditional Chinese: 興化縣; pinyin: Xīnghuà Xiàn), in Xing Prefecture. During the Jin dynasty and Yuan dynasty, it belonged to Yixing County (simplified Chinese: 宜兴县; traditional Chinese: 宜興縣; pinyin: Yíxìng Xiàn), in Xing Prefecture.

During the Ming Dynasty, the area was governed by the Yixing Qianhu Suo (simplified Chinese: 宜兴千户所; traditional Chinese: 宜興千戶所; pinyin: Yíxìng Qiānhù Suǒ), as part of the Weisuo system, as Shenshu Station (simplified Chinese: 神树站; traditional Chinese: 神樹站; pinyin: Shénshù Zhàn). The area later became part of the Nuoyin Wei (simplified Chinese: 诺音卫; traditional Chinese: 諾音衛; pinyin: Nuòyīn Wèi).

Immediately prior to the Qing dynasty, the area was primarily inhabited by nomadic Mongols. During the reign of the Kangxi Emperor, the area was settled by the Han Chinese, who established a village there. In 1736, the area was reorganized as part of the Chahar Bordered White Banner (simplified Chinese: 察哈尔镶白旗; traditional Chinese: 察哈爾鑲白旗; pinyin: Cháhā'ěr Xiāng Bái Qí), under the Eight Banners of Chahar. In 1778, it was reorganized as Tuchengzi (Chinese: 土城子; pinyin: Tǔchéngzǐ), and placed under Fengning County (simplified Chinese: 丰宁县; traditional Chinese: 豐寧縣; pinyin: Fēngníng Xiàn).

== Geography ==
Boluonuo is located 58 kilometres (36 mi) southeast of the urban core of Fengning Manchu Autonomous County, bordering Luanping County to the east and south and Longhua County to the north.

The town's terrain is high in the north and low in the south. The highest peak, Mount Guangling (Chinese: 广灵山; pinyin: Guǎnglíng Shān), is located at the northern border with the town of Fengshan, and has an altitude of 1,423 metres (4,669 ft) above sea level. The town's lowest point is located at the Niu River (Chinese: 牛河; pinyin: Niú Hé) near Caijiagoumen (Chinese: 蔡家沟门; pinyin: Càijiāgōumén) in the south, with an altitude of 500 metres (1,600 ft) above sea level.

=== Climate ===
The average annual temperature is 7.6 °C (45.7 °F), the average frost-free period is 136 days, and the average annual rainfall is 500 millimetres (20 in).

== Administrative divisions ==
Boluonuo is divided into the 11 administrative villages (Chinese: 行政村; pinyin: xíngzhèng cūn). The town has 69 natural villages (Chinese: 自然村; pinyin: zìrán cūn), which do not hold any administrative status).

Name	Simplified Chinese	Hanyu Pinyin	Manchu	Möllendorff
Villages
Boxi Village	波西村	Bōxī Cūn	ᠪᠣ ᡧᡳ ᡨᠣᡴᠰᠣ	bo ši tokso
Bodong Village	波东村	Bōdōng Cūn	ᠪᠣ ᡩᡡᠩ ᡨᠣᡴᠰᠣ	bo dūng tokso
Chagoumen Village	岔沟门村	Chàgōumén Cūn	ᠴᠠ ᡤᠣᡡ ᠮᡝᠨ ᡨᠣᡴᠰᠣ	ca goū men tokso
Shaohuying Village	哨虎营村	Shàohǔyíng Cūn	ᡧᠠᡡ ᡥᡠ ᠶᡳᠩ ᡨᠣᡴᠰᠣ	šaū hu ying tokso
Laoyingpan Village	老营盘村	Lǎoyíngpán Cūn	ᠯᠠᡡ ᠶᡳᠩ ᡦᠠᠨ ᡨᠣᡴᠰᠣ	laū ying pan tokso
Shihuigou Village	石灰沟村	Shíhuīgōu Cūn	ᡧᡳ ᡥᡠᡳ ᡤᠣᡡ ᡨᠣᡴᠰᠣ	ši hui goū tokso
Guanliang Village	官梁村	Guānliáng Cūn	ᡤᡠᠠᠨ ᠯᡳᠠᠩ ᡨᠣᡴᠰᠣ	guan liang tokso
Yangshulin Village	杨树林村	Yángshùlín Cūn	ᠶᠠᠩ ᡧᡠ ᠯᡳᠨ ᡨᠣᡴᠰᠣ	yang šu lin tokso
Henan Village	河南村	Hénán Cūn	ᡥᠣᠨᠠᠨ ᡨᠣᡴᠰᠣ	honan tokso
Laomiaoying Village	老庙营村	Lǎomiàoyíng Cūn	ᠯᠠᡡ ᠮᡳᠠᡡ ᠶᡳᠩ ᡨᠣᡴᠰᠣ	laū miaū ying tokso
Xigou Village	西沟村	Xīgōu Cūn	ᡧᡳ ᡤᠣᡡ ᡨᠣᡴᠰᠣ	ši goū tokso

== Demographics ==
A 2025 government publication reported that the town has a population of 12,237, residing in 4,036 households.

According to the 2010 census, Boluonuo had a population of 10,147, including 5,284 males and 4,863 females. The population was distributed as follows: 1,982 people aged under 14, 7,211 people aged between 15 and 64, and 954 people aged over 65.

== Economy ==
Boluonuo has various mineral deposits, including gold, copper, platinum, palladium, iron, and marble.

Major crops in the town include maize, various vegetables, apricots, and jujubes. Various plants used for Traditional Chinese medicine are also cultivated in the town, including Atractylodes lancea, Bupleurum chinense, and Scutellaria baicalensis.

== Transportation ==
National Highway 112 runs through Boluonuo.

== See also ==
- List of township-level divisions of Hebei
