= The Legion (film) =

2020 Spanish-American film by Jose Magan

- Film poster
- Directed by: José Magán
- Written by: Pedro Santamaria; Carmen Ballesteros
- Story by: José Magán; Pedro Santamaria
- Produced by: José Magán
- Starring: Mickey Rourke; Bai Ling
- Cinematography: Robert Reed Altman; Nacho Tundidor
- Edited by: Omar Bermudez
- Music by: Jordi Longan
- Production companies: Magol Films; Carbara Films; Equo Entertainment
- Distributed by: Saban Films
- Release date: May 8, 2020
- Running time: 96 minutes
- Countries: United States; Spain
- Languages: English; Spanish

The Legion is a 2020 Spanish-American action adventure film directed by Jose Magan, and featuring Mickey Rourke and Bai Ling. It is based on the war between Rome and Parthian Empire in Armenia from 58 to 63 AD. The Legion blends historical drama with action-adventure, capturing a small but intense moment of ancient warfare. However, the film has received mixed reviews for its pacing, character development, and overall execution.

It is Magán's directorial debut.

== Plot ==
The plot centers on Noreno, a half-Roman soldier, who is tasked with a perilous mission to save his besieged comrades. Two Roman legions are trapped in the snowy mountains of Armenia, surrounded by Parthian patrols, slowly perishing from cold and starvation. The main Roman army, stationed in Syria, is still two weeks away by foot, but the mountains are infested with enemy forces.

Despite his profound resentment of Rome, Noreno is chosen to traverse the treacherous, snowy mountains to seek reinforcements and rescue his fellow soldiers. His journey is fraught with dangers, including hostile patrols, harsh weather, and internal conflicts. Along the way, Noreno saves a distressed woman and gains assistance from an early Christian.

== Cast ==
- Lee Partridge as Noreno, the half-Roman soldier
- Mickey Rourke as General Corbulo
- Bai Ling as Amirah, Corbulo's mistress
- Joaquim de Almeida as General Paetus
- Vladimir Kulich as Marcus
- Bosco Hogan as Saul
- Marta Castellvi as Duria
- Tristan McConnell as Nerses
- Eric Higgins as Madyes
- Gavan Duffy as Saka
- Michael Redmond as Scyles
- Mark Aaron as Valerius
- Ciaran O’Grady as Claudius
- Jinny Lofthouse
- Enrique Inchausti
- Richard Wilson

== Release ==
The film was released in the United States on May 8, 2020, on video-on-demand and digital platforms.

== Reception ==
Tara McNamara of Common Sense Media awarded the film one star out of five.

Frank Scheck of The Hollywood Reporter gave the film a negative review and wrote, "Director Magán displays no flair for action sequences, although the budgetary limitations obviously didn't help. Nor does he successfully pull off the dramatic scenes, including one in which Rourke delivers an anguished, tearful monologue that plays like a decades-old Actors Studio audition piece and nearly erases all memories of his sensitive work in such films as Diner and The Wrestler."
