= Arc Light (film) =

1989 film

- Film poster
- Directed by: Zhang Junzhao
- Written by: Xu Xiaobin
- Starring: Weigang Fan; Yang Gao; Ping Guan; Bai Ling; Xiaohua Luo
- Cinematography: Feng Xiao
- Production company: Guangxi Film Studio
- Release date: July 1989
- Running time: 100 minutes
- Country: China
- Language: Mandarin

Arc Light (Chinese: 弧光; pinyin: Hú Guāng), also known as The Shining Arc, is a 1989 Chinese drama film directed by Zhang Junzhao. It was entered into the 16th Moscow International Film Festival.

== Cast ==
- Weigang Fan as Doctor Zheng
- Yang Gao as Floricultural old man
- Ping Guan as Jing Zhi
- Bai Ling as Jing Huan
- Xiaohua Luo as Jing's mother
- Yuanzhi Tang as Jing Hongcun
- Yanjie Tong as Xie Hong
- Xiong Xiao as Xie Ni
- Guangbei Zhang as Liu Kai
- Zhenyao Zheng as Xiao Bo
- Yitong Zhi as Xie Zining
