= Beitouying Township =

Beitouying Township 北头营乡 ᠪᡝᡳ ᡨᠣᡡ ᠶᡳᠩ ᡤᠠᡧᠠᠨ
- Township
- Pinyin: Běitóuyíng Xiāng; Möllendorff: Bei toū ying Gašan
- Location in Hebei Location in China
- Coordinates: 41°22′59″N 117°11′26″E
- Country: People's Republic of China
- Province: Hebei
- Prefecture-level city: Chengde
- Autonomous county: Fengning

Area
  - Total: 204.9 km^{2} (79.1 sq mi)

Population (2010)
  - Total: 6,529
  - Density: 31.87/km^{2} (82.5/sq mi)
- Time zone: UTC+8 (China Standard)

Beitouying Township (Chinese: 北头营乡; pinyin: Běitóuyíng Xiāng), (Manchu: ᠪᡝᡳ
ᡨᠣᡡ
ᠶᡳᠩ
ᡤᠠᡧᠠᠨ; Möllendorff romanization: bei toū ying gašan) is a rural township located in Fengning Manchu Autonomous County, Chengde, Hebei, China.

== Geography ==
Beitouying Township is located in the northeast of Fengning Manchu Autonomous County, 70 kilometres (43 mi) from the country's urban core, and 110 kilometres (68 mi) from the core of Chengde. Beitouying Township is bordered by Wangoumen Township and Hanjiadian Township in neighboring Longhua County to the east, by Guojiatun in Longhua County to the north, by Xiguanying Township to the west, and by Fengshan to the south.

The terrain is high in the northwest and low in the southeast, and the township has an average elevation of 760 metres (2,490 ft). The Niu River (Chinese: 牛河; pinyin: Niú Hé) and its tributaries flow from north to south through Beitouying Township.

The township has 1,635.58 hectares (16.3558 km^{2}) of cultivated land, 16,825.53 hectares (168.2553 km^{2}) of forest, and 956.66 hectares (9.5666 km^{2}) of grassland.

=== Climate ===
It has a semi-arid continental climate. Beitouying has an average annual temperature of 5.4 °C (41.7 °F), and a frost-free period of 120 days.

== Administrative divisions ==
Beitouying Township comprises seven administrative villages (Chinese: 行政村; pinyin: xíngzhèng cūn).

Name	Simplified Chinese	Hanyu Pinyin	Manchu	Möllendorff
Villages
Beitouying Village	北头营村	Běitóuyíng Cūn	ᠪᡝᡳ ᡨᠣᡡ ᠶᡳᠩ ᡨᠣᡴᠰᠣ	bei toū ying tokso
Songshuling Village	松树岭村	Sōngshùlǐng Cūn	ᠰᡡᠩ ᡧᡠ ᠯᡳᠩ ᡨᠣᡴᠰᠣ	sūng šu ling tokso
Dabagoumen Village	大坝沟门村	Dàbàgōumén Cūn	ᡩᠠ ᠪᠠ ᡤᠣᡡ ᠮᡝᠨ ᡨᠣᡴᠰᠣ	da ba goū men tokso
Yingtaogoumen Village	樱桃沟门村	Yīngtáogōumén Cūn	ᠶᡳᠩ ᡨᠠᡡ ᡤᠣᡡ ᠮᡝᠨ ᡨᠣᡴᠰᠣ	ying taū goū men tokso
Henanying Village	河南营村	Hénányíng Cūn	ᡥᠣ ᠨᠠᠨ ᠶᡳᠩ ᡨᠣᡴᠰᠣ	ho nan ying tokso
Bei'erying Village	北二营村	Běi èryíng Cūn	ᠪᡝᡳ ᡝᡵ ᠶᡳᠩ ᡨᠣᡴᠰᠣ	bei er ying tokso
Dongnangoumen Village	东南沟门村	Dōngnángōumén Cūn	ᡩᡡᠩ ᠨᠠᠨ ᡤᠣᡡ ᠮᡝᠨ ᡨᠣᡴᠰᠣ	dūng nan goū men tokso

== Demographics ==
A 2025 government publication states that Beitouying has a hukou population of 7,167, but just 3,123 permanent residents.

According to the 2010 census, Beitouying Township had a population of 6,529, including 3,427 males and 3,102 females. The population was distributed as follows: 1,195 people aged under 14, 4,634 people aged between 15 and 64, and 700 people aged over 65.

== Economy ==
In 2023, Beitouying Township had 7.54 million renminbi (RMB) of fiscal revenue, and had a per capita income of RMB 14,304.8.

The main crops grown in Beitouying Township include maize and grains. Animal husbandry is prevalent in Beitouying Township, and major livestock in the township includes cattle, sheep, pigs, and chickens. Other agricultural products cultivated in Beitouying Township including Siberian apricots, wood ear mushrooms and other types of mushrooms, hazelnuts, and flowers.

Mineral resources in the township include gold, silver, iron, zinc, and molybdenum.

== See also ==
- List of township-level divisions of Hebei
