= Paris (2003 film) =

- Directed by: Ramin Niami
- Written by: Ramin Niami; Steven Beschloss
- Produced by: Ramin Niami; Karen Robson
- Starring: Chad Allen; Bai Ling; James Russo; Irene Bedard; James Lew; Karen Black
- Cinematography: Jack Cochran
- Edited by: Ramin Niami
- Music by: John Cale
- Release date: 7 May 2003
- Running time: 98 minutes
- Country: United States
- Language: English

Paris is a 2003 American thriller film written and directed by Ramin Niami. Original music for this film was composed by John Cale, who had previously worked with Niami on his 1998 film Somewhere in the City.

== Cast ==
- Chad Allen as Jason Bartok
- Bai Ling as Linda / Shen Li
- James Russo as Leon King
- Irene Bedard as Sandy
- James Lew as Mr. Fue
- Karen Black as Chantelle
- Ron Jeremy as Bartender
- Biff Yeager as Bill Baker
- Valarie Pettiford as Terry
- François Chau as Mr. Kim
- Nancye Ferguson as Brenda
- Belinda Waymouth as Tina
- Jeni Chua as Mieko
- E.J. Callahan as Motel Owner
- John Snyder as Car Salesman
- Karen Robson as Receptionist
- Terry Camilleri as Poker Player
- Ramin Niami as Gunman
- Jason David Frank as Chad
