= Fengning Manchu Autonomous County =

Fengning County 丰宁县 ᡶᡝᠩ ᠨᡳᠩ ᠰᡳᠶᠠᠨ
- Autonomous county
- 丰宁满族自治县 ᡶᡝᠩ ᠨᡳᠩ ᠮᠠᠨᠵᡠ ᡠᡴᠰᡠᡵᠠ ᠪᡝᠶᡝ ᡰᡥᡳ ᠰᡳᠶᠠᠨ; Fengning Manchu Autonomous County
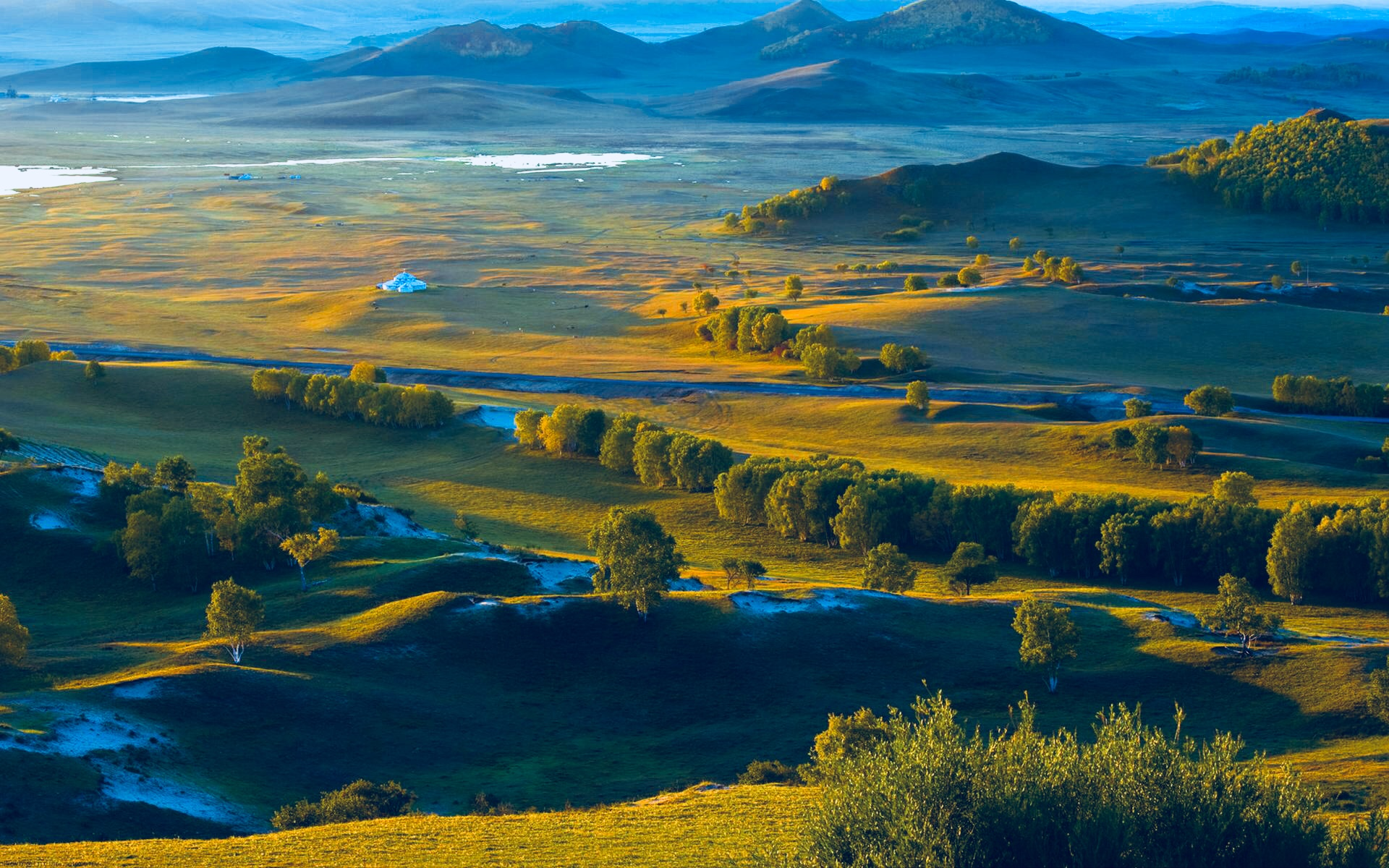
- Bashang meadows

- Location in Hebei
- Coordinates: 41°12′N 116°39′E
- Country: China
- Province: Hebei
- Prefecture-level city: Chengde
- County seat: Dage

Area
  - Total: 8,765 km^{2} (3,384 sq mi)
- Elevation: 662 m (2,172 ft)

Population (2020 census)
  - Total: 326,353
  - Density: 37.23/km^{2} (96.43/sq mi)
- Time zone: UTC+8 (China Standard)
- Postal code: 068300
- Area code: 0314
- Website: www.fengning.gov.cn

Fengning Manchu Autonomous County

Chinese name
- Simplified Chinese: 丰宁满族自治县
- Traditional Chinese: 豐寧滿族自治縣
Transcriptions
Standard Mandarin
- Hanyu Pinyin: Fēngníng Mǎnzú Zìzhìxiàn

Manchu name
- Manchu script: ᡶᡝᠩ ᠨᡳᠩ ᠮᠠᠨᠵᡠ ᡠᡴᠰᡠᡵᠠ ᠪᡝᠶᡝ ᡰᡥᡳ ᠰᡳᠶᠠᠨ
- Möllendorff: feng ning manju uksura beye žhi siyan

Fengning Manchu Autonomous County (Chinese: 丰宁满族自治县; Manchu: ᡶᡝᠩ ᠨᡳᠩ ᠮᠠᠨᠵᡠ ᡠᡴᠰᡠᡵᠠ ᠪᡝᠶᡝ ᡰᡥᡳ ᠰᡳᠶᠠᠨ) is a Manchu autonomous county of northern Hebei province, bordering Beijing to the southwest and Inner Mongolia to the north, and lying under the administration of the prefecture-level city of Chengde.

It is the second-largest county of Hebei in terms of area, after the neighbouring Weichang Manchu and Mongol Autonomous County.

== History ==
Fossils from the Jinfengopteryx, a genus of dinosaur, were discovered in Fengning Manchu Autonomous County. Other dinosaur fossils discovered in the autonomous county include one belonging to the ceratopsia suborder, and one of a stegosaurus, which both date back to approximately 130,000 million years ago. The area belonged to the wider Jehol Biota ecosystem.

Evidence suggests of human activity in the area of present-day Fengning Manchu Autonomous County dates back to approximately 30,000 to 50,000 years ago. Archaeological sites from the Hongshan culture and the Shanrong have been found in the autonomous county.

=== Qing dynasty ===
In 1735, the 13th year of the Yongzheng Emperor's, the Siqi Subprefecture (simplified Chinese: 四旗厅; traditional Chinese: 四旗廳; pinyin: Sìqí Tīng) was established in the area. In 1778, the area was reorganized as Fengning County (simplified Chinese: 丰宁县; traditional Chinese: 豐寧縣; pinyin: Fēngníng Xiàn).

=== People's Republic of China ===
In 1987, the State Council approve re-designating Fengning County as Fengning Manchu Autonomous County.

== Geography ==
Fengning Manchu Autonomous County is bordered by Beijing to the south and Inner Mongolia to the north. The autonomous county is located at the northern edge of the Yan Mountains, and the southern edge of the Inner Mongolia Plateau.

The Chao River, a tributary of the Chaobai River, and the Luan River both originate within the autonomous county.

The autonomous county is covered by 8.81 million mu of forest, 58.53% of its total area.

=== Geology ===
Fossil-bearing rocks of the Mesozoic Huajiying Formation and/or Yixian Formation occur on the surface. The prehistoric bird Paraprotopteryx was found in such a deposit.

=== Climate ===
Fengning has a rather dry, monsoon-influenced humid continental climate (Köppen Dwa), with long, very cold and dry winters, and hot, humid summers, and the elevation depresses temperatures. The monthly 24-hour mean temperature in January is −10.6 °C (12.9 °F), and in July it is 22.6 °C (72.7 °F), while the annual mean is 7.2 °C (45.0 °F). More than half of the annual precipitation occurs in July and August alone.

Climate data for Fengning, elevation 735 m (2,411 ft), (1991–2020 normals, extremes 1971–2010)
Month	Jan	Feb	Mar	Apr	May	Jun	Jul	Aug	Sep	Oct	Nov	Dec	Year
Record high °C (°F)	9.2 (48.6)	17.8 (64.0)	28.4 (83.1)	32.6 (90.7)	37.5 (99.5)	37.6 (99.7)	40.5 (104.9)	36.8 (98.2)	35.2 (95.4)	29.3 (84.7)	20.2 (68.4)	13.7 (56.7)	40.5 (104.9)
Mean daily maximum °C (°F)	−2.5 (27.5)	1.8 (35.2)	9.1 (48.4)	17.7 (63.9)	24.1 (75.4)	27.8 (82.0)	29.0 (84.2)	28.0 (82.4)	23.1 (73.6)	15.7 (60.3)	5.9 (42.6)	−1.5 (29.3)	14.9 (58.7)
Daily mean °C (°F)	−10.2 (13.6)	−6.3 (20.7)	1.2 (34.2)	9.7 (49.5)	16.4 (61.5)	20.5 (68.9)	22.7 (72.9)	21.2 (70.2)	15.4 (59.7)	7.8 (46.0)	−1.5 (29.3)	−8.8 (16.2)	7.3 (45.2)
Mean daily minimum °C (°F)	−16.0 (3.2)	−12.8 (9.0)	−6.0 (21.2)	1.9 (35.4)	8.6 (47.5)	13.9 (57.0)	17.3 (63.1)	15.6 (60.1)	9.1 (48.4)	1.4 (34.5)	−7.2 (19.0)	−14.2 (6.4)	1.0 (33.7)
Record low °C (°F)	−27.4 (−17.3)	−28.5 (−19.3)	−26.0 (−14.8)	−11.9 (10.6)	−3.7 (25.3)	4.0 (39.2)	8.8 (47.8)	0.5 (32.9)	−3.3 (26.1)	−10.5 (13.1)	−23.6 (−10.5)	−26.8 (−16.2)	−28.5 (−19.3)
Average precipitation mm (inches)	0.9 (0.04)	3.4 (0.13)	6.8 (0.27)	19.8 (0.78)	40.8 (1.61)	84.2 (3.31)	129.5 (5.10)	85.6 (3.37)	58.5 (2.30)	22.5 (0.89)	8.6 (0.34)	1.5 (0.06)	462.1 (18.2)
Average precipitation days (≥ 0.1 mm)	1.4	2.0	3.2	5.3	8.1	12.7	14.0	10.8	9.3	4.9	2.8	1.5	76
Average snowy days	2.7	2.8	3.7	1.7	0.1	0	0	0	0	0.8	3.2	2.4	17.4
Average relative humidity (%)	45	42	39	40	45	60	72	72	67	58	53	49	54
Mean monthly sunshine hours	207.7	208.6	246.4	252.3	277.5	242.0	228.3	236.8	230.4	226.6	198.0	195.4	2,750
Percentage possible sunshine	70	69	66	63	62	54	50	56	62	67	68	69	63
Source 1: China Meteorological Administration
Source 2: Weather China

== Administrative divisions ==
The county has 1 subdistrict, 11 towns and 15 townships under its administration. These township-level divisions then, in turn, administer 309 village-level divisions.

Name	Simplified Chinese	Hanyu Pinyin	Manchu	Möllendorff
Subdistricts
Xinfenglu Subdistrict	新丰路街道	Xīnfēnglù Jiēdào	ᠰᡳᠨ ᡶᡝᠩ ᠯᡠ ᠵᡠᡤᡡᠨ ᡤᡳᠶᠠ	sin feng lu jugūn giya
Towns
Dage Town	大阁镇	Dàgé Zhèn	ᡩᠠ ᡤᡝ ᡴᠠᡩᠠᠯᠠᠩᡤᠠ	da ge kadalangga
Datan Town	大滩镇	Dàtān Zhèn	ᡩᠠ ᡨᠠᠨ ᡴᠠᡩᠠᠯᠠᠩᡤᠠ	da tan kadalangga
Yu'ershan Town	鱼儿山镇	Yúérshān Zhèn	ᠶᡠ᠋ ᡝᡵ ᡧᠠᠨ ᡴᠠᡩᠠᠯᠠᠩᡤᠠ	yu' er šan kadalangga
Tucheng Town	土城镇	Tǔchéng Zhèn	ᡨᡠ ᠴᡥᡝᠩ ᡴᠠᡩᠠᠯᠠᠩᡤᠠ	tu cheng kadalangga
Huangqi Town	黄旗镇	Huángqí Zhèn	ᡥᡠᠠᠩ ᠴᡳ ᡴᠠᡩᠠᠯᠠᠩᡤᠠ	huang ci kadalangga
Fengshan Town	凤山镇	Fèngshān Zhèn	ᡶᡝᠩ ᡧᠠᠨ ᡴᠠᡩᠠᠯᠠᠩᡤᠠ	feng šan kadalangga
Boluonuo Town	波罗诺镇	Bōluónuò Zhèn	ᠪᠣᠯᡠᠣ ᠨᠣᠣᡵ ᡴᠠᡩᠠᠯᠠᠩᡤᠠ	boluo noor kadalangga
Heishanju Town	黑山咀镇	Hēishānjǔ Zhèn	ᡥᡝᡳ ᡧᠠᠨ ᡰᡠᡳ ᡴᠠᡩᠠᠯᠠᠩᡤᠠ	hei šan žui kadalangga
Tianqiao Town	天桥镇	Tiānqiáo Zhèn	ᡨᡳᠠᠨ ᠴᡳᠠᡡ ᡴᠠᡩᠠᠯᠠᠩᡤᠠ	tian ciaū kadalangga
Humaying Town	胡麻营镇	Húmáyíng Zhèn	ᡥᡠ ᠮᠠ ᠶᡳᠩ ᡴᠠᡩᠠᠯᠠᠩᡤᠠ	hu ma ying kadalangga
Jiangjunying Town	将军营镇	Jiāngjūnyíng Zhèn	ᠵᡳᠠᠩ ᠵᡠᠨ ᠶᡳᠩ ᡴᠠᡩᠠᠯᠠᠩᡤᠠ	jiang jun ying kadalangga
Townships
Wanshengyong Township	万胜永乡	Wànshèngyǒng Xiāng	ᠸᠠᠨ ᡧᡝᠩ ᠶᠣᠩ ᡤᠠᡧᠠᠨ	wan šeng yong gašan
Sichakou Township	四岔口乡	Sìchàkǒu Xiāng	ᠰᡳ ᡮ᠋ᠠ ᡴᠣᡡ ᡤᠠᡧᠠᠨ	si ts'a koū gašan
Sujiadian Township	苏家店乡	Sūjiādiàn Xiāng	ᠰᡠ ᠵᡳᠠ ᡨᡳᠠᠨ ᡤᠠᡧᠠᠨ	su jia tian gašan
Waigoumen Township	外沟门乡	Wàigōumén Xiāng	ᠸᠠᡳ ᡤᠣᡡ ᠮᡝᠨ ᡤᠠᡧᠠᠨ	wai goū men gašan
Caoyuan Township	草原乡	Cǎoyuán Xiāng	ᠴᠠᠣ ᠶᡠᠸᠠᠨ ᡤᠠᡧᠠᠨ	cao yuwan gašan
Kulongshan Township	窟窿山乡	Kūlóngshān Xiāng	ᡴᡠ ᠯᡡᠩ ᡧᠠᠨ ᡤᠠᡧᠠᠨ	ku lūng šan gašan
Xiaobazi Township	小坝子乡	Xiǎobàzǐ Xiāng	ᡧᡳᠠᡡ ᠪᠠ ᡯᡳ ᡤᠠᡧᠠᠨ	šiaū ba dzi gašan
Wudaoying Township	五道营乡	Wǔdàoyíng Xiāng	ᠸᡠ ᡩᠠᡡ ᠶᡳᠩ ᡤᠠᡧᠠᠨ	wu daū ying gašan
Xuanjiangying Township	选将营乡	Xuǎnjiāngyíng Xiāng	ᡧᡠᠠᠨ ᠵᡳᠠᠩ ᠶᡳᠩ ᡤᠠᡧᠠᠨ	šuan jiang ying gašan
Xiguanying Township	西官营乡	Xīguānyíng Xiāng	ᡧᡳ ᡤᡠᠠᠨ ᠶᡳᠩ ᡤᠠᡧᠠᠨ	ši guan ying gašan
Wangying Township	王营乡	Wángyíng Xiāng	ᠸᠠᠩ ᠶᡳᠩ ᠶᡳᠩᡤᠠᡧᠠᠨ	wang ying gašan
Beitouying Township	北头营乡	Běitóuyíng Xiāng	ᠪᡝᡳ ᡨᠣᡡ ᠶᡳᠩ ᡤᠠᡧᠠᠨ	bei toū ying gašan
Shirengou Township	石人沟乡	Shíréngōu Xiāng	ᠰᡥᡳ ᡵᡝᠨ ᡤᠣᡠ ᡤᠠᡧᠠᠨ	shi ren goū gašan
Tanghe Township	汤河乡	Tānghé Xiāng	ᡨᠠᠩ ᡥᡝ ᡤᠠᡧᠠᠨ	tang he gašan
Yangmuzhazi Township	杨木栅子乡	Yángmùshānzǐ Xiāng	ᠶᠠᠩ ᠮᡠ ᡯᠠ ᡯᡳ ᡤᠠᡧᠠᠨ	yang mu dza dzi gašan

== Demographics ==
Per government sources, Fengning Manchu Autonomous County has an urbanization rate of 24.35%.

=== Ethnic groups ===
There are 35 different government-recognized ethnic groups living in Fengning Manchu Autonomous County. Approximately 266,400 residents are ethnically Manchu (66.56% of the total population). The next largest ethnic group are the Han Chinese, which number about 106,800 (26.69%). Other major ethnic groups in the autonomous county include the Hui and the Mongols.

== Economy ==
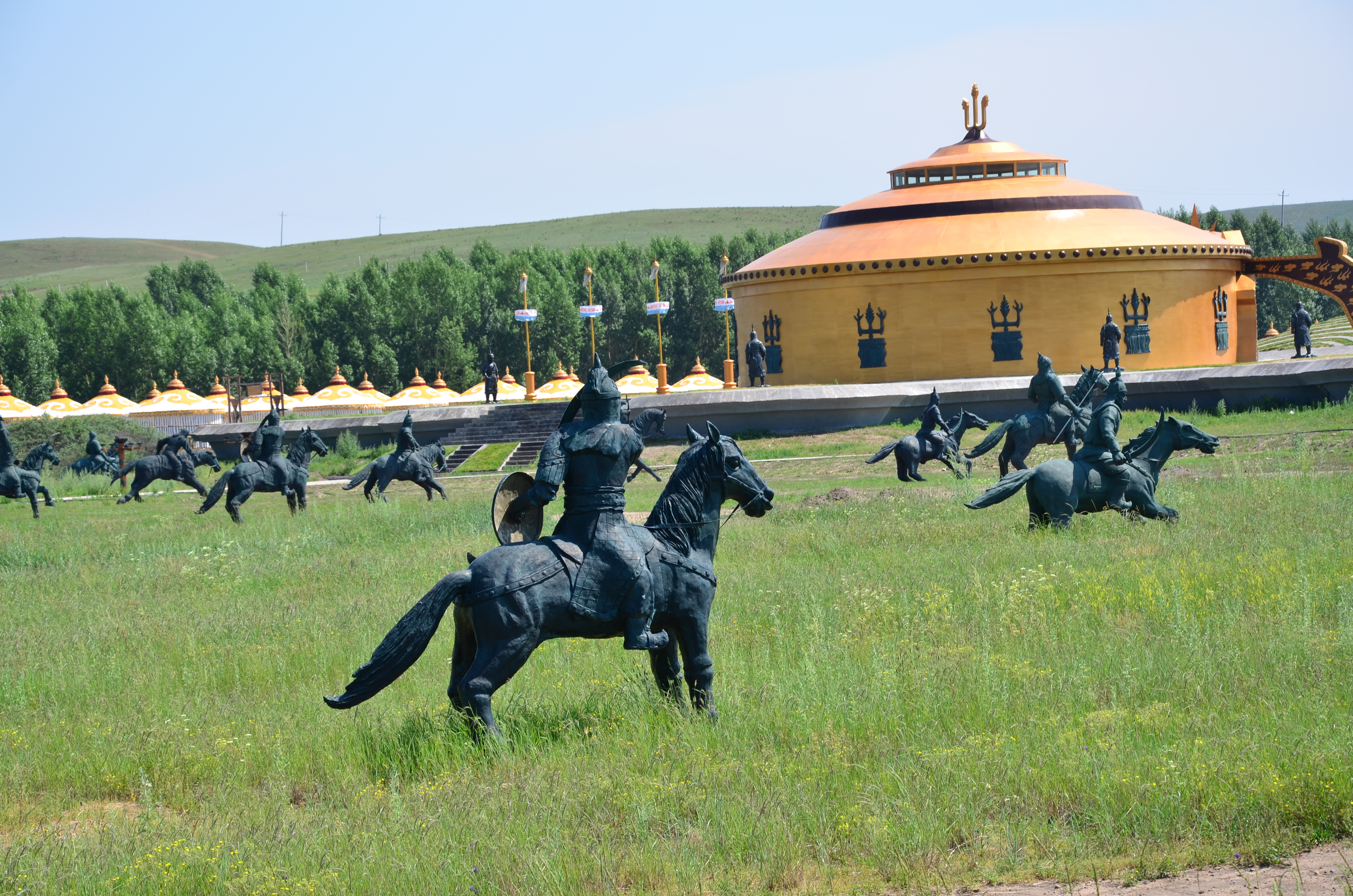
Site of a former temporary palace of Genghis Khan on northern grasslands of the county.

The county draws in many tourists as the Bashang Grasslands in the far north of the county is the nearest grasslands to Beijing. The cultivation of a local tourism is part of a broader regional development policy to support tourism as a primary industry in the Chengde area due to the environmentally friendly character of the industry going well with the goal of preserving the Chengde area's pristine environment, especially compared to the pollution problems besetting the rest of Hebei and also Beijing and Tianjin.

The county's primary tourist attraction are the horse ranches in the Datan grassland. Other highlights are the Dahan Palace of Genghis Khan and the Baiyun Ancient Cave. The height of the tourism season is in July and August when there are bonfire festivities filled with ethnic songs and dances, roasted whole lamb, and staged traditional sporting events like wrestling and archery.

Significant deposits of molybdenum have been found in Fengning Manchu Autonomous County.

== Culture ==
The Manchu people of Fengning Manchu Autonomous County have a distinct style of papercutting, which is included in China's National Intangible Cultural Heritage List.

== Transport ==
Both China National Highway 111 and 112 pass through the county, with the former providing direct access to Beijing. The Zhangjiakou–Chengde Expressway, a segment of the G95 Capital Area Loop Expressway, also runs through the autonomous county.

The autonomous county is served by two railroads: the Duolun–Fengning railway, which runs from Fengning Manchu Autonomous County to Duolun County in Inner Mongolia, and the Tangshan–Baotou railway.

== Notable people ==
- Guo Xiaochuan
