= Caoyuan Township =

Caoyuan Township 草原乡 ᠴᠠᠣ ᠶᡠᠸᠠᠨ ᡤᠠᡧᠠᠨ
- Township
- Pinyin: Cǎoyuán Xiāng; Möllendorff: Cao yuwan Gašan
- Location in Hebei Location in China
- Coordinates: 41°57′48″N 116°20′37″E
- Country: People's Republic of China
- Province: Hebei
- Prefecture-level city: Chengde
- Autonomous county: Fengning Manchu Autonomous County

Area
  - Total: 190.6 km^{2} (73.6 sq mi)

Population (2010)
  - Total: 4,877
  - Density: 25.59/km^{2} (66.3/sq mi)
- Time zone: UTC+8 (China Standard)

Caoyuan Township (Chinese: 草原乡; pinyin: Cǎoyuán Xiāng), Manchu: ᠴᠠᠣ
ᠶᡠᠸᠠᠨ
ᡤᠠᡧᠠᠨ; Möllendorff romanization: cao yuwan gašan) is a rural township located in Fengning Manchu Autonomous County, Chengde, Hebei, China.

== Geography ==
Caoyuan Township is located in the northern part of Fengning Manchu Autonomous County, 86.4 kilometres (53.7 mi) northwest of the county seat. It borders Duolun County in Inner Mongolia to the west, north, and northeast, Wanshengyong Township to the south, Yu'ershan to the southwest, and Waigoumen Township to the east.

The township's terrain is generally high in the south and low in the north. The highest peak, Mount Fengshui (Chinese: 风水山; pinyin: Fēngshuǐ Shān), is located in the southeastern part of the township, and reaches an elevation of 1,718 metres (5,636 ft) above sea level. The lowest point is located in wetlands within Caoyuan Village (Chinese: 草原村), at an elevation of 1,343 metres (4,406 ft) above sea level.

Caoyuan Township has no perennial rivers, and both surface water and groundwater are scarce.

The township has 38,000 mu of cultivated land, 150,000 mu of grassland, and 85,000 mu of forest.

=== Climate ===
The township has semi-arid continental climate. Springs and autumns in Caoyuan Township are typically characterized by dry and windy weather, with dramatic temperature swings and large diurnal temperature differences. Summers are dry but without extreme heat, while winters are cold and windy with snow. The average annual temperature is 1.2 °C (34.2 °F), the frost-free period is 87 days, and the average annual precipitation is 351.3 millimetres (13.83 in).

== Administrative divisions ==
Caoyuan Township is divided into four administrative villages (Chinese: 行政村; pinyin: xíngzhèng cūn). The township has 43 natural villages (Chinese: 自然村; pinyin: zìrán cūn), which have no administrative status.

Name	Simplified Chinese	Hanyu Pinyin	Manchu	Möllendorff
Villages
Caoyuan Village	草原村	Cǎoyuán Cūn	ᠴᠠᠣ ᠶᡠᠸᠠᠨ ᡨᠣᡴᠰᠣ	cao yuwan tokso
Heshundian Village	和顺店村	Héshùndiàn Cūn	ᡥᡝ ᡧᡠᠨ ᡩᡳᠠᠨ ᡨᠣᡴᠰᠣ	he šun dian tokso
Gongbaotong Village	公宝同村	Gōngbǎotóng Cūn	ᡤᡡᠩ ᠪᠠᡡ ᡨᡡᠩ ᡨᠣᡴᠰᠣ	gūng baū tūng tokso
Dongwopu Village	东窝铺村	Dōngwōpù Cūn	ᡩᡡᠩ ᠸᠣ ᡦᡠ ᡨᠣᡴᠰᠣ	dūng wo pu tokso

== Demographics ==
According to the 2010 census, Caoyuan Township had a population of 4,877, including 2,601 males and 2,276 females. The population was distributed as follows: 765 people aged under 14, 3,748 people aged between 15 and 64, and 364 people aged over 65.

== Economy ==
Most people's income in Caoyuan Township comes from agriculture and animal husbandry. Major crops grown in Caoyuan Township include grains and potatoes.

Provden mineral deposits in the township include fluorite, quartz, gypsum, and iron.

== See also ==
- List of township-level divisions of Hebei
