= The Key (2014 film) =

- Theatrical release poster
- Directed by: Jefery Levy
- Written by: Jefery Levy
- Based on: The Key by Jun'ichirō Tanizaki
- Produced by: Susan Traylor; Jefery Levy
- Starring: David Arquette; Bai Ling
- Cinematography: William MacCollum
- Edited by: Pablo Espada; Scott Roon
- Music by: Jamey Scott
- Production company: The Key Film
- Release date: November 21, 2014
- Running time: 85 minutes
- Country: United States
- Language: English

The Key is a 2014 American erotic drama film written and directed by Jefery Levy, loosely based on Jun'ichirō Tanizaki's 1956 novel. It stars David Arquette and Bai Ling as a disenchanted married couple whose sexual relationship is told through their personal journals. It was released in the United States on November 21, 2014, and on DVD on July 16, 2015.

== Cast ==
- David Arquette as Jack
- Bai Ling as Ida
- Nathan Keyes as Kim
- Nathalie Love as Mia
- Brian Wasiak as Dr. C
