= The Key (Tanizaki novel) =

Novel by Junichiro Tanizaki

- Cover of the first edition
- Author: Jun'ichirō Tanizaki
- Original title: Kagi (鍵)
- Translator: Howard Hibbett
- Language: Japanese
- Publisher: Chūō kōron
- Publication date: 1956
- Publication place: Japan
- English publication date: 1961
- Media type: Print

The Key (Japanese: 鍵, Hepburn: Kagi) is a novel by Japanese writer Jun'ichirō Tanizaki first published in 1956.

== Synopsis ==
The entire story is told in diary form, switching between the entries of a 55-year-old university professor and his 10 years younger wife Ikuko. Both claim that they want to keep their notes secret from another, and complain about the difficulties in their sex life: she about her husband's inability to satisfy her, he about her insatiability, mixed with her oldfashioned attitude and rejection of his erotic preferences. At the same time he is convinced that, would she allow him to act out his wishes, he would be able to fulfil her desires.

The couple has chosen teacher Kimura as a possible marriage prospect for their daughter Toshiko, but Toshiko shows no interest in him. Instead, the husband believes to sense a mutual interest between Kimura and Ikuko, and realises that his jealousy stimulates him. He provokes situations in which Kimura can see Ikuko naked, starting with making her drunk which leads to her repeated collapsing and need to be looked after. Also, he has sex with his wife while she is unconscious, during which she utters the name of Kimura. At Kimura's offer, the professor borrows his polaroid camera, which he uses to make nude photographs of Ikuko. Later, he switches to negative film, making sure that Kimura sees the pictures. At the same time, he has his doctor inject him hormones to improve his potency, which result in dangerously high blood pressure and memory defects.

Toshiko moves out of her parents' house, while Ikuko starts meeting Kimura on a regular basis. The professor suffers a stroke due to his blood pressure; although he first seems to recover, he dies after a second stroke. In her last entries, Ikuko reveals that both she and her husband wrote their diaries in full knowledge that the other side reads them, that her states of unconsciousness were at times faked, and that Toshiko possibly made arrangements so that her mother and Kimura could meet. Ikuko speculates that Toshiko will eventually marry Kimura as a pretence so her mother and he can continue their affair.

The novel's title refers to the key to the compartment in which the professor keeps his diary.

== Publication history ==
Tanizaki's novel first appeared in serialised form in 1956 in Chūō kōron, starting with the magazine's January issue which quickly sold out. It was translated into English by Howard Hibbett and published by Alfred A. Knopf in 1961.

== Reception ==
In his book Five Modern Japanese Novelists, author Donald Keene states that The Key gained attraction and was widely discussed for its explicit eroticism. Yet, although formally "brilliantly handled", the novel is missing typical Tanizaki themes like the longing for a mother or worshipping of a cruel woman, concluding that it was, compared to others of the writer's works, "not very deeply rooted".

== Film adaptations ==
The Key has repeatedly been adapted into films, including:

- 1959: Odd Obsession, directed by Kon Ichikawa
- 1974: The Key, directed by Tatsumi Kumashiro
- 1983: The Key, directed by Tinto Brass
- 1983: The Key, directed by Akitaka Kimata
- 1997: The Key, directed by Toshiharu Ikeda
- 2014: The Key, directed by Jefery Levy
- 2022: The Key: Professor's Pleasure, directed by Hiroki Inoue

== Bibliography ==
- Hibbett, Howard, trans. "The Key". Tanizaki Junichiro. New York: Vintage, 2004
- McClellan, Edwin (1960). "Review of The Key". Monumenta Nipponica. 16 (1/2): 205–211. doi:10.2307/2383364. ISSN 0027-0741. JSTOR 2383364.
- "Visions of Desire: Tanizaki's Fictional Worlds". Ito, Ken. Stanford University Press, 1991
