= Zhang Junzhao =

Chinese film director and screenwriter (1952–2018)

- Born: October 1952; Beijing, China
- Died: 9 June 2018 (aged 65); Dalian, Liaoning, China
- Occupations: Film director, screenwriter
- Years active: 1984–2002

Chinese name
- Traditional Chinese: 張軍釗
- Simplified Chinese: 张军钊
Transcriptions
Standard Mandarin
- Hanyu Pinyin: Zhāng Jūnzhāo

Zhang Junzhao (Chinese: 张军钊; October 1952 – 9 June 2018) was a Chinese film director and screenwriter who was mainly active in the 1980s. A graduate of the Beijing Film Academy and a contemporary of acclaimed directors Zhang Yimou, Chen Kaige, and Tian Zhuangzhuang, Zhang Junzhao was a prominent early member of China's Fifth Generation filmmakers. His 1984 film One and Eight is well known as the film that marked the advent of the Fifth Generation, while The Shining Arc (1988) was selected for competition for the Golden St. George award at the 1989 Moscow International Film Festival.

== Early life and career ==
Zhang Junzhao was born in October 1952 in Beijing, with ancestral roots in Henan province. He became involved in propaganda plays put on by the Red Guards during the Cultural Revolution, both as an actor and a director. In 1978 he entered the newly reopened Beijing Film Academy. After graduating in 1982, he and his classmates Chen Kaige and Zhang Yimou were assigned to Guangxi Film Studio in Nanning.

== Filmography ==
=== One and Eight ===
In 1984, as an assistant director at Guangxi Film Studio, Zhang Junzhao teamed up with cinematographer Zhang Yimou and designer He Qun to make a war film called One and Eight (Yige he bage). Set in North China during the Second Sino-Japanese War, the film tells the story of eight criminals and a wrongly accused officer being held as prisoners by the Communist Eighth Route Army. When almost all the regular soldiers are killed, most of the nine men make the choice to fight beside the remnants of the army and acquit themselves with honor and bravery.

Although it was the first film production of Guangxi Studios, predating the internationally acclaimed Yellow Earth (1984), the release of One and Eight was stalled for three years by "official objections to portions of the storyline and consequent re-shooting and re-editing." Nonetheless it, along with Yellow Earth, is widely considered to be one of the inaugural Fifth Generation films. Moreover, although wartime setting and the protagonists' overriding patriotism were common elements of communist Chinese cinema, its emphasis on the individual over the group, its existential tone, and its beautiful and innovative cinematography helped to set it apart as the herald of a new generation of Chinese filmmakers.

=== The Shining Arc ===
In 1989, after something of a dry spell, Zhan Junzhao reappeared on the Chinese film scene with The Shining Arc (弧光; hú guāng). Its protagonist is a young woman, portrayed by Bai Ling, who convinces herself that she is a witch. Placed in a mental hospital, she is given over to the care of a probing female psychiatrist. The film, like One and Eight, "aims to pose existential questions" and also "capture a certain mood of oriental mysticism."

The Shining Arc (also translated as Arc Light) was one of China's entries into the 16th Moscow International Film Festival in 1989. It was selected for competition for the Golden St. George award, but lost to the Italian film The Icicle Thief.

=== Other works ===
In the period between One and Eight and The Shining Arc, Zhang Junzhao also made two less remarkable films: Come on, China! (1985) and The Lonely Murderer (1986). The former was a sports film made in the wake of the four-year world championship of the Chinese national women's volleyball team. Neither garnered a great deal of attention, and both are often omitted in surveys of Zhang Junzhao's work.

== Film and politics ==
Zhang Junzhao and his fellow Fifth Generation filmmakers "were famous for their participation...in making experimental art films that challenged the socialist realist tradition." However, Zhang was the first of them to turn away from such films for the sake of popular entertainment. Justifying his actions, he "suggested finding a middle ground between the elite and the popular taste, calling, somewhat naively, for compromise and harmony between audiences and artists." Still, Zhang also took into account what he believed to be political necessity when it came to the content and structure of his films, claiming that his conservative and conventional work was necessary to survive in the face of China's censorship policies: "Horse Thief and On the Hunting Ground lost tens of thousands of yuan between them, and no one went to them,” he said in one interview, talking about fellow director and Beijing Film Academy graduate Tian Zhuangzhuang. “Do you think the Xi'an Film Studio will dare to use him again?”

== Later life and death ==
Because of health issues, Zhang made few films in his later life. His final work was the 2002 television drama Linglong Girl (玲珑女). Zhang died on 9 June 2018 in Dalian, Liaoning, at the age of 65.
