= Night Caller (2021 film) =

- Directed by: Chad Ferrin
- Written by: Chad Ferrin
- Produced by: Chad Ferrin; Robert Steven Rhine
- Starring: Susan Priver; Robert Miano; Steve Railsback; Bai Ling; Lew Temple
- Cinematography: Kyle McConaghy
- Music by: Richard Band
- Production companies: Crappy World Films; Girls and Corpses Films
- Release dates: 1 October 2021 (Cleveland Horror Fest); 13 May 2022 (United States)
- Running time: 84 minutes
- Country: United States
- Language: English

Night Caller is a 2021 American horror film directed by Chad Ferrin, starring Susan Priver, Robert Miano, Steve Railsback, Bai Ling and Lew Temple.

== Cast ==
- Susan Priver as Clementine Carter
- Robert Miano as Charles Carter
- Steve Railsback as Andrew Lubitz
- Bai Ling as Jade Mei
- Lew Temple as Dick Lubitz
- Kelli Maroney as Emily Carter
- Silvia Spross as Jenny Tarkovskiy
- Robert Steven Rhine as Detective Fuller
- James MacPherson as Detective Simms

== Release ==
The film was released on VOD and Digital platforms on Friday the 13th.

== Reception ==
David Gelmini of Dread Central rated the film 4 stars out of 5, writing, "Whether you happen to be an adamant believer of a hardcore skeptic when it comes to spiritual mediums, you will still probably be hugely entertained by Night Caller." Martin Unsworth of Starburst rated the film 4 stars out of 5, calling it an "impressive melting pot of several iconic examples of the genre". Jim Morazzini of Nerdly rated the film 4 stars out of 5, writing, "While Night Caller lacks the constant suspense of the best films of its genre it does have plenty of jump scares mixed in with the gore." Film critic Kim Newman wrote a positive review of the film.

Jason Delgado of Film Threat was more critical of the film, rating it 5 out of 10 and writing "Night Caller goes to the depths of absurdity at times, albeit not in a funny way. As such, it just comes off as a sick and strange picture with copious gore, but it does not send chills down your spine."
