= Somewhere in the City =

- Directed by: Ramin Niami
- Written by: Patrick Dillon; Ramin Niami
- Produced by: Ramin Niami; Karen Robson
- Starring: Sandra Bernhard; Ornella Muti; Robert John Burke; Peter Stormare; Bai Ling
- Cinematography: Igor Sunara
- Edited by: Elizabeth Gazzara; Ramin Niami
- Music by: John Cale
- Release date: 18 September 1998
- Running time: 94 min.
- Country: United States
- Language: English

Somewhere in the City is a 1998 American indie comedy-drama film written and directed by Ramin Niami.

== Cast ==
- Sandra Bernhard as Betty
- Ornella Muti as Marta
- Robert John Burke as Frankie
- Peter Stormare as Graham
- Bai Ling as Lu Lu
- Paul Anthony Stewart as Che
- Bulle Ogier as Brigitte
- Linda Dano as Television Producer
- Bill Sage as Justin
- Kim Walker as Molly
- Ed Koch as himself
- Mohammad B. Ghaffari (as Mohammad Ghaffari) as Teddy

== Soundtrack ==
The movie score was composed by Welsh composer and recording artist John Cale, who performed it with Dawn Buckholz and Mark Deffenbaugh. The score was released alongside other songs used in the film on a soundtrack album in 1998.
