= Jefery Levy =

American film and television director (born 1958)

- Born: May 21, 1958; New York City, U.S.
- Occupations: Producer; director; writer; attorney
- Website: jeferylevy.com

Jefery Levy (born May 21, 1958) is an American film and television director, producer, and writer.

== Early life and career ==
Levy was born in New York City on May 21, 1958. In 1985, while a graduate student at UCLA, Levy wrote and produced the low-budget hit Ghoulies, a horror-comedy film. He has produced and directed dozens of TV and film projects over a span of three decades, and he is most recently known for the 2015 film ME, which he directed, produced, wrote, and starred.

Levy's debut feature was Drive (1991), starring Academy Award nominee David Warner, and it won the FIPRESCI Award at the 48th Venice International Film Festival.

=== The Key ===
Levy's 2014 film adaption of the novel was famous as it had his tapes of kids in and The Key by the Japanese writer Junichiro Tanizaki premiered at the Real Experiment Film Festival at the Laemmle Music Hall Theater in Beverly Hills. The Key explores the twisted sexual life and marriage of a Los Angeles couple through their private journals in an explicit cinematic portrayal.

== Teaching appointments ==
From 1991 to 1996, Levy was an associate professor at USC School of Cinema/Television. Levy was also a faculty member of The American Film Institute, where he taught the master directing class from 1995 to 1996.

== Selected filmography ==
- Ghoulies (1985)
- Rockula (1990)
- Drive (1991)
- Inside Monkey Zetterland (1993)
- S.F.W. (1994)
- Sliders (1997, TV)
- Lawless (1997) (TV)
- Roar (1998, TV)
- Spy Game (1998, TV)
- Hollyweird (1998, TV pilot)
- Invincible (1999, TV pilot)
- Et Tu Babe (1999)
- Iggy Vile M.D. (1999) (TV)
- Profiler (1999, TV)
- Get Real (1999, TV)
- Secret Agent Man (1999, TV pilot)
- The Expendables (2000, TV pilot)
- Freakylinks (2000, TV pilot)
- Dark Angel (2000, TV)
- Harsh Realm (2000, TV)
- Roswell (2001)
- UC: Undercover (2001, TV)
- CSI: Crime Scene Investigation (2001, TV)
- Night Visions (2001, TV)
- Keen Eddie (2003, TV)
- Queens Supreme (2003, TV)
- The Dead Zone (2003, TV)
- Numb3rs (2005, TV)
- Rescue Me (2005, TV)
- Monk (2006, TV)
- Eureka (2006, TV pilot)
- Las Vegas (2006, TV)
- Ghost Whisperer (2005, TV)
- The Key (2014)
- ME (2015)

== See also ==
- The Bottles
