= Ramin Niami =

- رامین نیامی
- Born: January 1, 1952; Tehran, Iran
- Education: Medway College of Design UK; University of Westminster
- Occupations: Film director, producer, writer, editor
- Spouse: Karen Robson

Ramin Niami (Persian: رامین نیامی) is an Iranian film director, producer, actor and writer. In 1989, he was editor of The Houseguest, a film directed by Franz Harland. During his career, he has participated in more than twenty documentary films. He also made several feature films such as Somewhere in the City (1998) and Paris (2003).

== Career ==
He was born in Tehran, Iran, educated at film school in London and worked as a director and producer on over twenty television documentaries, many of them broadcast by the UK’s BBC and Channel 4, as well as major American networks. A New York resident for many years, Ramin was a faculty member for filmmaking at the School of Visual Arts in New York. He also produced Amir Naderi’s festival favorite Manhattan By Numbers in New York.

Niami’s first feature film as a director was Somewhere in the City, starring Sandra Bernhard, Bai Ling, Ornella Muti and Peter Stormare; the film screened at over 25 international film festivals, was released theatrically in the U.S. and on HBO and was sold in countries around the world. After relocating to Los Angeles, he directed and produced his second feature film Paris which premiered in main competition at the Tribeca Film Festival in New York, starring Chad Allen, Bai Ling, James Russo and Karen Black. Paris also screened as the opening night film of the Bangkok Film Festival and played many other international film festivals. Paris was released in the U.S. by DEJ/Blockbuster and 20th Century Fox Home Video and broadcast on Showtime/TMC.

Babe’s & Rickey’s Inn was the winner of the Pan African Film Festival Programmer’s Award 2013 and premiered theatrically at Laemmle Monica 4 Plex in LA. It was screened in several other major cities such as New York, Chicago, Dallas, Seattle, Portland, etc. It is also available in the US and Canada through Cinedigm on VOD (video on demand), digital and other on-line platforms.

Shirin in Love, directed by Ramin Niami, is an Iranian-American romantic comedy feature film he wrote, directed and produced. set in Los Angeles and Northern California, which stars Nazanin Boniadi (How I Met your Mother, Homeland), Riley Smith (Radio, Freaks and Geeks), Academy Award-nominated actress Amy Madigan (Field of Dreams, Gone Baby Gone), Maz Jobrani (The Interpreter, founding member of the Axis of Evil Comedy Tour), George Wallace (Funny People, headliner at The Flamingo, Las Vegas), Anahita Khalatbari and Marshall Manesh (Will & Grace, Entourage) was theatrically released in March 2014 as a co-release with AMC Independent in at least 15 major cities in the US. In 2018, Ramin Niami produced Amir Naderi's film Magic Lantern starring Monk Serrell-Freed, Sophie Lane Curtis, Jacqueline Bisset, Robert Beltran which premiered at Venice Film Festival.

Eye Without A Face, which he was writer/director/producer, is a psychological thriller/horror film starring Dakota Shapiro, Luke Cook, Vlada Verevko was recently released in the US, Canada, and the UK. This was the first collaboration between Ramin Niami and his daughter cinematographer Tara Violet Niami. Eye Without a Face has been described as "a Rear Window for the digital age, and justifiably so." The film's score was composed by Charlie Clouser. Clouser described his score as "a claustrophobic all-electronic soundscape of a brain slowly malfunctioning, as usual! [The] tension builds to a startling conclusion."

Most recently, Ramin Niami wrote, directed, and produced Fade Away, a dramatic feature film primarily shot in Umbria, Italy, which stars Nicolas Porcelli and Anastasia Bay. The film, which was executive produced by director Amir Naderi, will premiere in Main Competition at the Matera International Film Festival in the 2026 Edition.

He also directed a documentary entitled Michael: Now and Then which revisits the people and places of his thesis film Michael which he made while attending Polytechnic Central London (now known as University of Westminster). Michael, a docudrama about a miner and his son in South Wales which featured non-professional actors, screened at festivals back in 1976 and 1977, including the Giffoni Film Festival. Niami's new documentary Michael: Now and Then was shot by his daughter, cinematographer Tara Violet Niami and it will be released in 2027.

== Personal life ==
Niami is married to actress, producer, and entertainment lawyer Karen Robson.
