= Karen Robson =

Australian lawyer, producer and actress

Karen Robson (born 19 March 1957) is an Australian entertainment lawyer, producer and briefly an actress, best known for her portrayal of the mysterious brunette Irma in the Peter Weir cult classic Picnic at Hanging Rock. She is based in Los Angeles and is a partner in the law firm Pryor Cashman LLP, where she specializes in film finance.

== Early life ==
She was born in Malacca, Malaysia.

== Career ==
=== Actress ===
Robson made her acting debut in Picnic at Hanging Rock, a 1975 film by Peter Weir. She played Irma, one of the three girls who went missing and the only one who was found. Her only other acting credit was in the 2003 film Paris (which she helped produce), in the role of the receptionist.

=== Entertainment lawyer and producer ===
Robson has helped produce films ranging from Nick Nolte's Affliction to Sylvester Stallone's Cliffhanger. She has represented a significant portion of producers, lenders, equity investors and distributors in a wide range of financings, including senior and mezzanine debt and equity, international co-productions, U.S. and foreign tax incentivized financings and crowd funding, with an added focus on animation and TV joint ventures. She represents a variety of financiers, banks, equity investors, high-profile independent producers and production companies for which she structures film finance transactions, as well as provides production legal representation.

Over the past sixteen years she has handled financing on multiple picture deals and single pictures, television mini-series and major documentaries. Some of her practice has included an overall financing distribution arrangement for a major independent producer with United Artists; a $200 million credit facility for a production company based at Warner Brothers on behalf of a bank syndicate; and tax incentive international film financing for a major independent producer.

She worked on the first HD 3D film, released by Disney in April 2003, the directorial debut of Russell Crowe titled The Water Diviner, James Cameron’s groundbreaking digital 3D IMAX feature underwater documentary Ghosts of the Abyss, ReelFx’s animated feature film Free Birds, Edward R. Pressman’s The Crow and its spinoffs including the Crow feature film reboot, and a series of international TV co-productions for a major US basic cable network. She has also worked extensively in international media and strategic entertainment investments and acquisitions in India, China, Japan, the Middle East, UK, Australia, Europe (particularly Germany) and Latin America.

She has represented a number of slate equity funds for production funding for independently financed films and TV. She has also worked on international co-production pacts involving equity and distribution for major U.S. motion pictures with budgets in excess of a $100 million.

== Personal life ==
Robson is married to Iranian-born film director Ramin Niami and has two children.
